= Debut (Zoë album) =

Studio album by Zoë
- Released: 23 October 2015
- Genre: Pop; French pop
- Length: 40:43
- Language: French
- Label: Global Rockstar Music

Singles from Debut
- 1. "Quel filou" Released: 12 March 2015; 2. "Je m'en fous" Released: 26 June 2015; 3. "Mon cœur a trop aimé" Released: 31 July 2015; 4. "Loin d'ici" Released: 5 February 2016

Debut is the debut studio album by Austrian singer, songwriter, and actress Zoë (full name Zoë Straub). The album was released on 23 October 2015 through Global Rockstar Music.

== Singles ==
- "Quel filou" was released as the lead single from the album on 12 March 2015. It competed in Wer singt für Österreich? 2015, where it placed third. The song peaked at number 23 on the Ö3 Austria Top 40.
- "Je m'en fous" was released as the album's second single on 26 June 2015.
- "Mon cœur a trop aimé" was released as the album's third single on 31 July 2015. It peaked at number 12 on the Austrian Top 40 singles chart.
- "Loin d'ici" was released as the album's fourth single on 5 February 2016. It won Wer singt für Österreich? 2016, and represented Austria in the Eurovision Song Contest 2016.

== Track listing ==
No.	Title	Length
1.	"Je m'en fous"	3:22
2.	"Devinez"	3:13
3.	"Danse avec moi"	3:33
4.	"Rien ne va plus"	3:33
5.	"Quel filou"	2:59
6.	"Adieu"	2:47
7.	"Mon ange"	3:27
8.	"Mon cœur a trop aimé"	3:27
9.	"Je t'aime"	3:02
10.	"Rends-moi mon cœur"	2:49
11.	"Pourquoi alors je pleure"	4:13
12.	"Loin d'ici"	4:18
Total length:		40:43

== Charts ==
=== Weekly charts ===
Chart (2015)	Peak position
Austrian Albums (Ö3 Austria)	5

=== Year-end charts ===
Chart (2016)	Position
Austrian Albums (Ö3 Austria)	75

== Certifications ==
Region	Certification	Certified units/sales
Austria (IFPI Austria)	Gold	7,500^{*}
^{*} Sales figures based on certification alone.

== Release history ==
Region	Date	Format(s)	Label
Austria	23 October 2015	CD; digital download	Global Rockstar Music
Worldwide	14 November 2015	CD; digital download	Global Rockstar Music
