= The Makemakes =

Austrian pop rock band

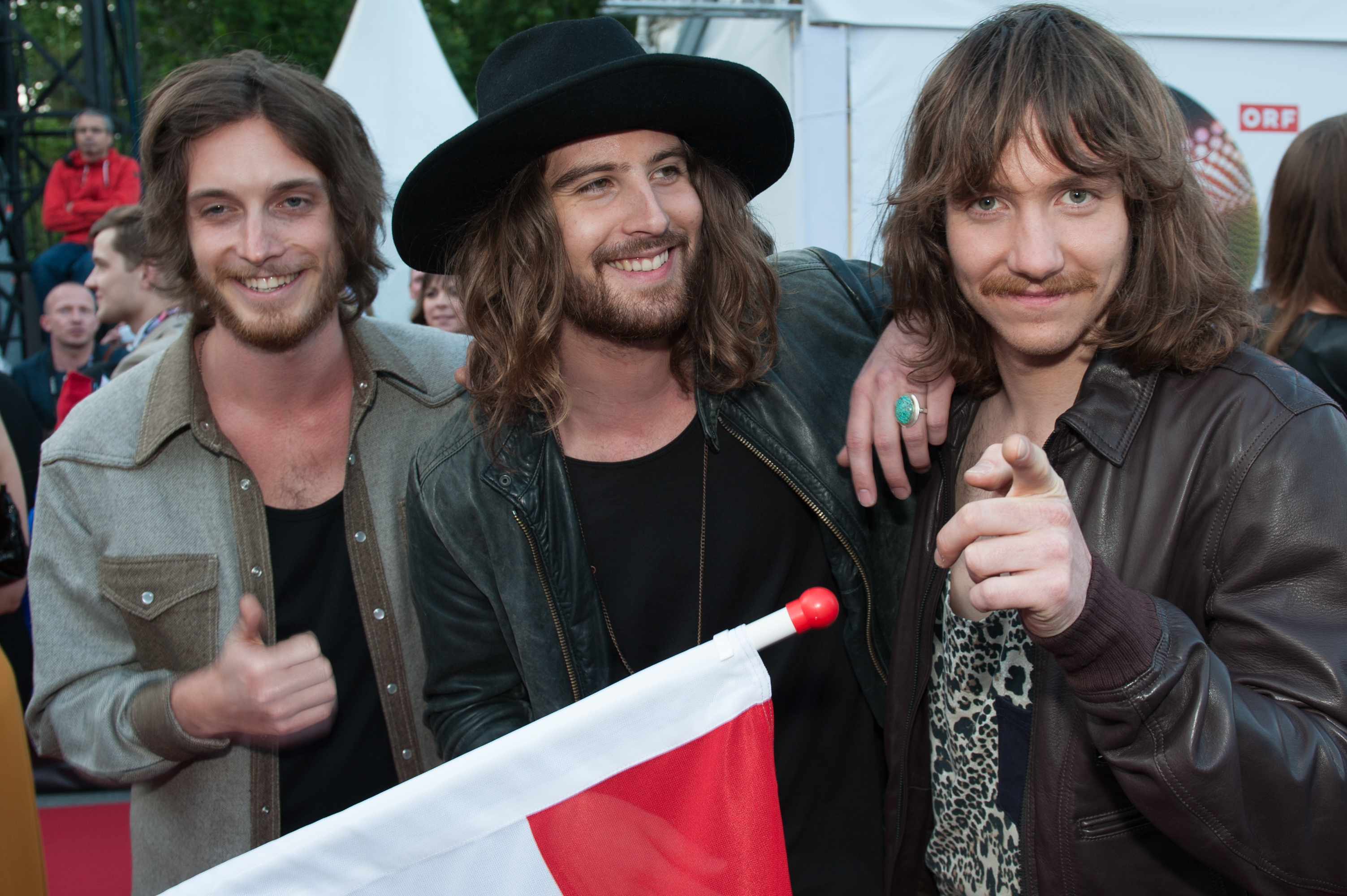
- The Makemakes at Eurovision 2015

Background information
- Origin: Austria
- Genres: Pop rock
- Years active: 2012–present
- Members: Dominic "Dodo" Muhrer; Markus Christ; Florian Meindl
- Website: www.themakemakes.com

The Makemakes are an Austrian pop rock band, comprising Dominic "Dodo" Muhrer, Markus Christ and Florian Meindl. They represented Austria in the Eurovision Song Contest 2015 with the song "I Am Yours".

== Career ==
=== 2012–2014: Early beginnings ===
On 15 June 2012, The Makemakes released their debut single "The Lovercall". The song peaked at number 6 on the Austrian Singles Chart. On 15 April 2014, they released the single "Million Euro Smile". The song peaked at number 2 on the Austrian Singles Chart.

=== 2015: Eurovision Song Contest and The Makemakes ===
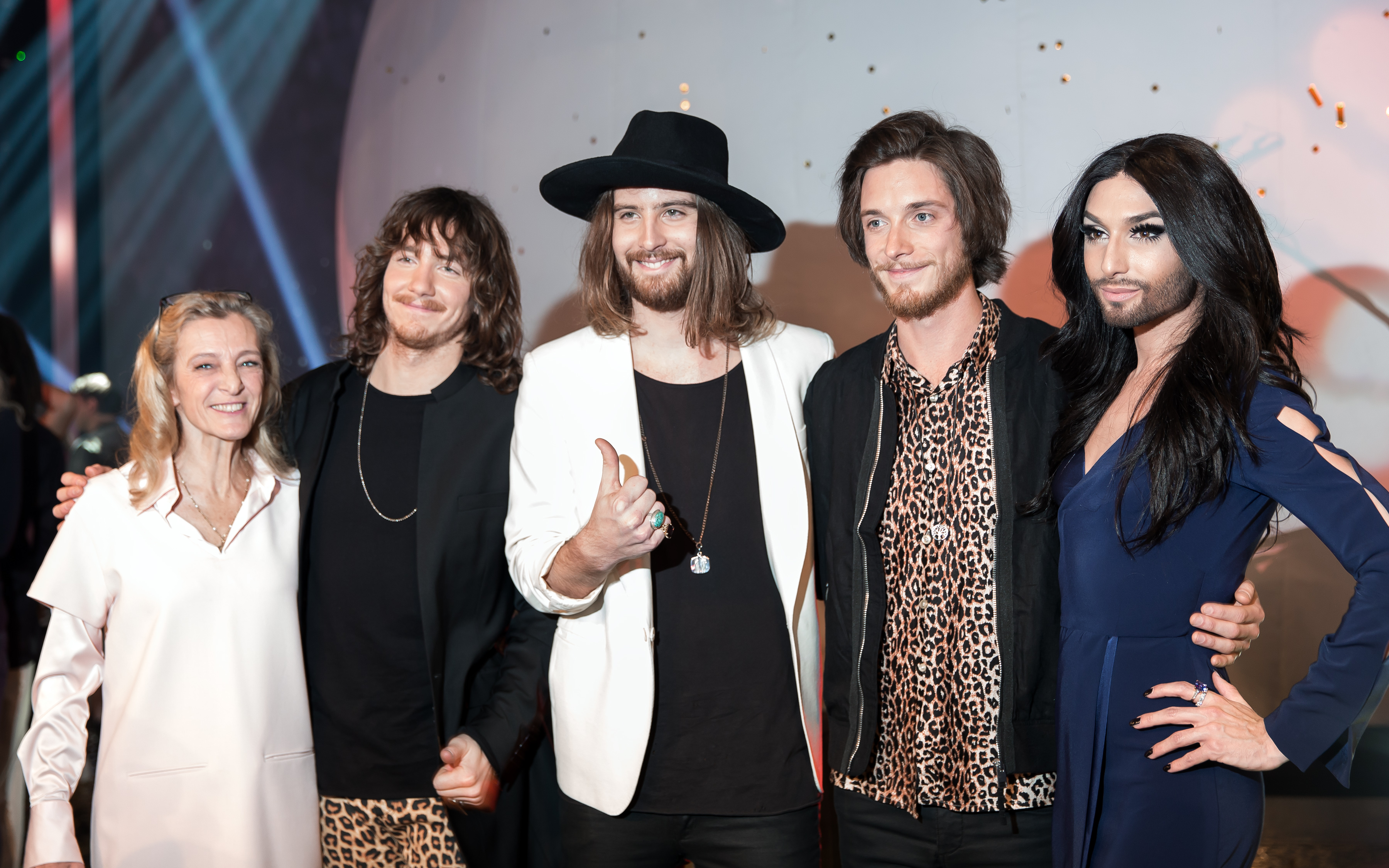
The Makemakes with Conchita Wurst

On 13 March 2015, The Makemakes were chosen to represent Austria in the Eurovision Song Contest 2015 with the song "I Am Yours". The song was selected through a national final organised by the Austrian broadcaster Österreichischer Rundfunk (ORF). Austria was automatically qualified to compete in the finals on 23 May 2015, due to its win the previous year. They tied with Germany for last place with a score of zero, becoming the first representatives of a host nation to fail to score a single point, since 1957. However, the band took their Eurovision loss in good spirits, making the repeated joke "We are the zeroes of our time!" (in reference to a lyric from the winning song, "Heroes"). The band released their debut studio album The Makemakes on 12 May 2015.

=== 2018–present ===
In March 2018, The Makemakes released a new single "Keep On Moving" in Austria. In January 2019, the band released the single "Freedom" in Austria. In July 2019, the band released the single "The Beach". The song peaked at number 21 on the Scottish Singles Chart and number 60 on the UK Singles Downloads Chart.

== Discography ==
=== Albums ===
Title	Details	Peak chart positions
Title	Details	AUT
The Makemakes	Released: 12 May 2015; Label: Almost Perfecto Records; Format: Digital download, CD	7

=== Singles ===
Title	Year	Peak chart positions				Album
Title	Year	AUT	ICE	SCO	UK Down.	Album
"The Lovercall"	2012	6	—	—	—	Non-album singles
"Million Euro Smile"	2014	2	—	—	—	Non-album singles
"I Am Yours"	2015	2	35	—	—	The Makemakes
"Keep On Moving"	2018	—	—	—	—	Non-album singles
"Freedom"	2019	—	—	—	—	Non-album singles
"The Beach"	2019	—	—	21	60	Non-album singles
"Heyo"	2019	—	—	22	67	Non-album singles
"Vivo per lei"	2020	—	—	—	—	Non-album singles
"Acqua santa" (with Flÿing D)	2023	—	—	—	—	Non-album singles
"—" denotes a recording that did not chart or was not released in that territory.

=== Promotional singles ===
Title	Year	Album
"Big Bang"	2015	The Makemakes

Awards and achievements
Preceded by Conchita Wurst with "Rise Like a Phoenix"	Austria in the Eurovision Song Contest; 2015	Succeeded by Zoë with "Loin d'ici"
