= Kiddy Contest =

Austrian televised singing competition

- Created by: Erwin Kiennast; Norman Weichselbaum
- Presented by: Elmer Rossnegger (season 1–12); Mirjam Weichselbraun (season 13–14); Benny Hörtnagl (season 15); Kati Bellowitsch (season 16–17); Arabella Kiesbauer (season 18–20; 25); Silvia Schneider (season 21–24)
- Country of origin: Austria
- Original language: German
- No. of seasons: 25

Production
- Running time: c. 120 minutes

Original release
- Network: ORF 1 (1995–2011); ZDF (2000); KiKA (2001–02); Super RTL (2004–06, 2008); Nickelodeon (2009–2011); Puls 4 (2012–2019)
- Release: 5 November 1995 – 19 October 2019

The Kiddy Contest was a televised singing competition for children from 8 to 14 years, broadcast and organized annually by the Austrian broadcaster ORF from 1995 to 2011. It was also broadcast in Germany on ZDF, RTL and Nickelodeon. From 2012 until its final edition in 2019, the show only aired on the Austrian commercial broadcaster Puls 4. Running for 25 editions, the format was invented by the music producers Erwin Kiennast and Norman Weichselbaum.

From 1995 to 2019, ten to thirteen children from Germany, Austria and Switzerland were chosen to perform a current pop hit, for which Norman Weichselbaum had written a new German text. The audience determined the winner(s) via voting. From season 1 to 15, there were also duets.

== Broadcast ==
The Kiddy Contest 1996 took place on a Saturday morning in November 1996. During the 1995 and 1996 editions, the semifinals took place over the course of several weeks during the ORF / Confetti TiVi program Saturday Game moderated by Edith Rolles.

In 1997 there were separate Kiddy Contest semi-finals, which was also shown for five weeks on Saturdays in Confetti Tivi. It was moderated by Elmer Rossnegger. From 1998, there was no semifinals more on television, the pre-selection was made by a panel of experts. In 2015, the semi-finals were broadcast on the two Saturdays before the final. On both days, ten children each came and sang against each other in a duet. Only five of them each reached the final.

The Kiddy Contest was not only broadcast on ORF 1, but has also aired several times on German television, where it was freely available throughout Europe on the satellite Astra 1. In the years 2000 to 2002 the channel ZDF acted as a co-organizer of the program, during which the participants came from Germany and the program was shown on ZDF. In the years 2001 and 2002 it was transferred to KiKA. After 2002, ZDF decided not to participate anymore and the Kiddy Contest 2003 became a purely Austrian production.

Already in 2004, ORF again found a new partner. This time it was the German private channel Super RTL. The transmission scheme wasn't changed, but Super RTL was also forced to renounce the otherwise usual advertising interruptions during the show. The cooperation with Super RTL lasted until 2006.

The Kiddy Contest 2007 was again a single production of ORF. The previous specials in the lunch program were replaced by the series "Kiddy Contest – Das Camp", which was broadcast for several days in the afternoon program of ORF 1. The series documented the participation of the participants of the Kiddy Contest 2007 in Schloss Hof in Lower Austria.

In 2008 the Kiddy Contest was shown again on ORF 1 and Super RTL. The final took place on the 1 November 2008 at 20:15. The moderator of the show was again Mirjam Weichselbraun.

The Kiddy Contest 2009 was recorded in the Austria Center Vienna on 31 October 2009, and a week later on 7 November on ORF 1 at 4.45 pm. The show aired for the German fan base on the children's transmitter Nickelodeon in the German-speaking area a day later. The show was moderated by Benny Hörtnagl, star guests were Daniel Schuhmacher and Mandy Capristo (winner of season 7 / Monrose).

In 2010 the Kiddy Contest was broadcast live on ORF 1 with the new moderator Kati Bellowitsch. Nickelodeon showed a 60-minute summary a week later.

From 2012 to 2019, the private broadcaster Puls 4 secured the rights for the broadcast. The moderator of the show was Silvia Schneider from 2015 to 2018. From 2015 onwards, the program has also been broadcast via live stream on the Internet and in the Puls 4 app. Alamande Belfor has been responsible for the choreography since 2017. In 2019, Arabella Kiesbauer was the host of the show again.

In 2020 the Kiddy Contest was canceled due to the Corona pandemic. In view of the still uncertain COVID-19 pandemic situation in 2021, the producers announced on December 21, 2020 that the format would be discontinued and that the Kiddy Contest 2019, as the 25th anniversary show, was the last.

== Series overview ==
Season	Premiere date	Winner(s)	Runner-up(s)	2nd Runner-up(s)	Other contestants (Note: In seasons 1 to 8, 10 and 11 the placements of all participants were revealed, but in season 9, and from 12 onwards only the placements of the top 3.) (Note: In season 5, contestants Paloma Seger and Tanja Petrasek had the same number of votes and placed both third/fourth place.) (Note: In season 8, contestants Verena Doublier, Lisa Grubner and Manuel Hartweger had the same number of votes and placed second/third place.) (Note: In season 9, contestants Eva Huss and Katharina Bergant had the same number of votes and placed both second/third place.)	Number of contestants (Note: From season 1 to 15, there were also duets.)
1	5 November 1995	Christina Kramer	Heike Holler	Katrin Senn & Lisa Huber	Christoph Neubauer, Thomas Breuer, Tanja Danzer, Hendrik Steiner, Nina Tatzber & Peter Fischer, Irene Hadjieva & Werner Göber, Simone Kopmajer	13
2	24 November 1996	Marina Schweinberger	Niki Kracher	Jennifer Erlbacher	Bettina Ebner & Miky Biton, Samuel Royer & Sara Kepplinger, Elisabeth Frankhauser, Hanna Kopenetz, Florian Gepp, Sonja Cresnik, Hannes Arnold & Nesrin Ünal	13
3	16 November 1997	Manuela Mayer	Sabrina Rasztovits	Ramona Curin	Lisa Katrin Hofer & Michael Senft, Stefanie Glawogger, Paul Pfleger, Manuel Stocker & Sabrina Vandrovec, Bianca Turker, Tanja Steinlechner, Daniela Koral	12
4	14 November 1998	Alexandra Pötzelsberger	Nadja Vogel	Katrin Wurzer & Thomas Havlik	Anna Sophie Kostal & Lisa Tatzber, Lisa-Marie Falzberger, Thomas Zimmermann, Viktoria Prieling, Julia Platzer, Contanze Slamanig & Richard Peter, Stephanie Markovits	13
5	20 November 1999	Bernhard Arko & Daniel Pirker	Sabine & Susanne Sedlmayer	Paloma Seger / Tanja Petrasek	Marie Tatiana Lamreiner-Ngoda & Stefan Mosonyi, Nadine Nathalie Eisl, Tanja Brankovic, Jean Novljan, Maria Aschenwald, Vera Böhnisch	13
6	18 November 2000	Daniela Vogel & Marco Klemmer	Sandra Stolp	Sophia Pund	Christoph Erlach, Hanna Kastner, Eva Böhnisch, Wendy Dindic, Wilke Brinkmann, Michéle Luttenberger, Orry Bandara Athurugiri	11
7	17 November 2001	Mandy Capristo	Anna Lena Breunig	Simone Renner	Christian Wimmer & Laura Elssel, Viktoria Schöffl, Jakob Semotan, Jimonique Schüler, Salka Weber, Frank Kühnlein, Simon Panstingl & Tina Pechmann	12
8	16 November 2002	Laura Kästel	Lisa Grubner & Manuel Hartweger / Verena Doublier		Sebastian Killinger, Christina Pöckl, Sebastian Killinger, Esther Dierkes & Julian Weber, Manuel Millonig, Ira-Sofie Graf, Annabel Hernandez, Anna-Verena Ruth	12
9	15 November 2003	Nicki Freiberger	Eva Huss / Katharina Bergant		Lissi Rieß & Sammy Pohn, Janine Blumauer, Julia Andrä, Julian Heidrich, Nathanaele Koll, Nina Kremsmair, Stephanie Laggner	11
10	1 November 2004	Lisa Aberer	Manuel Gutleb & Natália Kelly	Elin Skrzipczyk	Saskia Zikeli, Sandy Ontl, Alexander Gutmaier, Pino Severino-Geysen, Christina Klein, Kristina Wurm, Kimberly Rydel	11
11	1 November 2005	Kim Steiner	Andrea Wilhelmer & Joachim Goller	Vera Luttenberger	Todor Manojlovic, Carolina Grigorov, Lisa König, Sebastian Berger, Viktoria Kulmer, Nicole Dyane Corvinus, Selina Shirin Müller	11
12	1 November 2006	Tanja Kreutmayer	Fariba Buchheim	Lisa Wissert	Eva Vanessa Brunmayr, Melissa Perilli, Nicolas Geisler, Paul Kunz, Ron Mizrahi & Vanessa Veraldi, Stephanie Zwanzer, Teresa Strobl	11
13	26 October 2007	Caroline Hat	Meggie Jacobs	Julia Hübner	Daniel Eisele & Magdalena Kaiblinger, Jo Marie Dominiak, Kiara Hollatko, Leonie Adam, Marco Schrotter, Sebastian Schmidt, Zoë Straub	11
14	1 November 2008	Mira Sophia Ulz	Thilo Berndt	Chiara Aufegger	Aleksandar Abazoski, Carmeline Turki, Iris Rachel Voskov, Leonie Holz, Magda Ruck, Sophia Hopfer & Stefan Schößwendter, Vanessa Scheffenacker	11
15	31 October 2009	Lara Krause & Roman Lochmann	Dominik Gassner	Sarah Hager	Anna Rott, Diana-Maria Krieger, Jasmin Walchshofer, Klara Jovanovic, Mely Pagger, Philip Oezelt, Vivien Barman	11
16	30 October 2010	Dominik Schrittesser	Asja Ahatovic	Laura Kamhuber	Alicja Wojcik, Celina Baudisch, Jessika Brei, Laurin Greiter, Marcello Delpino, Paulina Vereti, Tamara Badegruber	10
17	29 October 2011	Celina Müllner	Mathias Rodler	Katrin Kogler	Anna Prütz, Andrea Lienbacher, Else Mack, India Callender, Karyna Verba, Michael Samek, Sarah Bednarz	10
18	27 October 2012	Michelle Idlhammer	Julia Rosenmayr	Laura Heily	Alex Baumgartner, Elena Spörl, Elisabeth Preiss, Ewa-Maria Zorn, Joli Francisco, Lukas Rumpold, Saskia Bisanz	10
19	26 October 2013	Lisa Mikolaschek	Vanessa Dollinger	Olivia Goga	Amelie Gabryszak, Carina Seebacher, Jakob Silye, Marcel Bodner, Ronja Harsch, Siri Kotschnig, Viola Dillinger	10
20	8 November 2014	Lena Tirler	Nina Hafner	Kilian Scheyer	Estelle Lath, Hanna Harkamp, Jason Schwickerath, Jessy Schiessl, Juliane Hotter, Marie Lang, Sarah Kaiser	10
21	7 November 2015	Alinah Hofstätter	Paul Aschenwald	Markus Manzl	Anna Hölzl, Emelie Missiuk, Laura Reder, Selina Gerstmayer, Simon Stabauer, Sophia Joham, Uljana Schmal	10
22	22 October 2016	Christian Steger	Tamia Edwards	Madita Killinger	Anupam Sharma, Daria Tayel, Driola Haspel, Flora Turhani, Karina Michel, Saphira Essmann, Theresa Tschiggerl	10
23	21 October 2017	Ina Hofer	Livia Ernst	Lena Balogh	Helena Manoussakis, Isabella Schmid, Lisa-Marie König, Max Lehner, Michael Heidemann, Niklas Lichtenegger, Susan Oseloff	10
24	20 October 2018	Josef Fankhauser	Martina Szymanek	Selina Pichler	Hannah Hruska, Madeleine Tosun, Mara Walter, Mary Schönbauer, Nils Vandeven, Raschel Fischmann, Viviana Renzl	10
25	19 October 2019	Katharina Felzmann	Helena Strasser	Luca Sommerauer	Alisa Berkovitch, Boti Stelczer, Daniel Slavinski, Ina Bahr, Lara Voicu, Teodora Vio, Vanessa Deimbacher	10

== Contestants ==
=== Season 1, 1995 ===
Name	Start number	Place
Christoph Neubauer	06	10
Thomas Breuer	09	9
Tanja Danzer	01	8
Hendrik Steiner	02	7
Nina Tatzber	07	6
Peter Fischer	07	6
Irene Hadjieva	10	5
Werner Göber	10	5
Simone Kopmajer	05	4
Katrin Senn	04	3
Lisa Huber	04	3
Heike Holler	03	2
Christina Kramer	08	1

=== Season 2, 1996 ===
Name	Start number	Place
Bettina Ebner	04	10
Miky Biton	04	10
Samuel Royer	01	9
Sara Kepplinger	01	9
Elisabeth Frankhauser	03	8
Hanna Kopenetz	07	7
Florian Gepp	09	6
Sonja Cresnik	06	5
Hannes Arnold	10	4
Nesrin Ünal	10	4
Jennifer Erlbacher	08	3
Niki Kracher	02	2
Marina Schweinberger	05	1

=== Season 3, 1997 ===
Name	Start number	Place
Lisa Katrin Hofer	02	10
Michael Senft	02	10
Stefanie Glawogger	06	9
Paul Pfleger	05	8
Manuel Stocker	08	7
Sabrina Vandrovec	08	7
Bianca Turker	04	6
Tanja Steinlechner	01	5
Daniela Koral	07	4
Ramona Curin	09	3
Sabrina Rasztovits	02	2
Manuela Mayer	10	1

=== Season 4, 1998 ===
Name	Start number	Place
Anna Sophie Kostal	01	10
Lisa Tatzber	01	10
Lisa-Marie Falzberger	09	9
Thomas Zimmermann	03	8
Viktoria Prieling	06	7
Julia Platzer	02	6
Constanze Slamanig	10	5
Richard Peter	10	5
Stephanie Markovits	08	4
Katrin Wurzer	05	3
Thomas Havlik	05	3
Nadja Vogel	07	2
Alexandra Pötzelsberger	04	1

=== Season 5, 1999 ===
Name	Start number	Place
Marie Tatiana Lamreiner-Ngoda	07	10
Stefan Mosonyi	07	10
Nadine Nathalie Eisl	06	9
Tanja Brankovic	04	8
Jean Novljan	02	7
Maria Aschenwald	01	6
Vera Böhnisch	03	5
Tanja Petrasek	08	3-4
Paloma Seger	09	3-4
Sabine Sedlmayer	05	2
Susanne Sedlmayer	05	2
Bernhard Arko	10	1
Daniel Pirker	10	1

=== Season 6, 2000 ===
Name	Start number	Place
Christoph Erlach	08	10
Hanna Kastner	04	9
Eva Böhnisch	06	8
Wendy Dindic	07	7
Wilke Brinkmann	03	6
Michéle Luttenberger	02	5
Orry Bandara Athurugiri	01	4
Sophia Pund	09	3
Sandra Stolp	05	2
Daniela Vogel	10	1
Marco Klemmer	10	1

=== Season 7, 2001 ===
Name	Start number	Place
Christian Wimmer	04	10
Laura Elssel	04	10
Viktoria Schöffl	08	9
Jakob Semotan	03	8
Jimonique Schüler	10	7
Salka Weber	02	6
Frank Kühnlein	07	5
Simon Panstingl	09	4
Tina Pechmann	09	4
Simone Renner	06	3
Anna Lena Breunig	05	2
Mandy Capristo	01	1

=== Season 8, 2002 ===
Name	Start number	Place
Sebastian Killinger	01	10
Christina Pöckl	02	9
Esther Dierkes	04	8
Julian Weber	04	8
Manuel Millonig	07	7
Ira-Sofie Graf	05	6
Annabel Hernandez	06	5
Anna-Verena Ruth	03	4
Verena Doublier	08	2-3
Lisa Grubner	09	2-3
Manuel Hartweger	09	2-3
Laura Kästel	10	1

=== Season 9, 2003 ===
Name	Start number	Place
Julia Andrä	02	4
Nathanaele Koll	03	4
Nina Kremsmair	04	4
Lissi Rieß	05	4
Sammy Pohn	05	4
Julian Heidrich	07	4
Stephanie Laggner	08	4
Janine Blumauer	09	4
Eva Huss	01	2-3
Katharina Bergnant	10	2-3
Nicki Freiberger	06	1

=== Season 10, 2004 ===
Name	Start number	Place
Saskia Zikeli	02	10
Sandy Ontl	05	9
Alexander Gutmaier	08	8
Pino Severino-Geysen	03	7
Christina Klein	04	6
Kristina Wurm	09	5
Kimberly Rydel	01	4
Elin Skrzipczyk	06	3
Manuel Gutleb	07	2
Natália Kelly	07	2
Lisa Aberer	10	1

=== Season 11, 2005 ===
Name	Start number	Place
Todor Manojlovic	08	10
Carolina Grigorov	09	9
Lisa König	01	8
Sebastian Berger	03	7
Viktoria Kulmer	04	6
Nicole Dyane Corvinus	02	5
Selina Shirin Müller	05	4
Vera Luttenberger	07	3
Andrea Wilhelmer	06	2
Joachim Goller	06	2
Kim Steiner	10	1

=== Season 12, 2006 ===
Name	Start number	Place
Eva Vanessa Brunmayr	01	4
Teresa Strobl	02	4
Nicolas Geisler	03	4
Ron Mizrahi	05	4
Vanessa Veraldi	05	4
Melissa Perilli	07	4
Paul Kunz	08	4
Stephanie Zwanzer	09	4
Lisa Wissert	06	3
Fariba Buchheim	10	2
Tanja Kreutmayer	04	1

=== Season 13, 2007 ===
Name	Start number	Place
Jo Marie Dominiak	01	4
Marco Schrotter	02	4
Kiara Hollatko	04	4
Zoë Straub	05	4
Daniel Eisele	07	4
Magdalena Kaiblinger	07	4
Sebastian Schmidt	08	4
Leonie Adam	10	4
Julia Hübner	09	3
Meggie Jacobs	06	2
Caroline Hat	03	1

=== Season 14, 2008 ===
Name	Start number	Place
Vanessa Scheffenacker	01	4
Leonie Holz	04	4
Sophia Hopfer	05	4
Stefan Schößwendter	05	4
Carmeline Turki	07	4
Aleksandar Abazoski	08	4
Magda Ruck	09	4
Iris Rachel Voskov	10	4
Chiara Aufegger	06	3
Thilo Berndt	02	2
Mira Sophia Ulz	03	1

=== Season 15, 2009 ===
Name	Start number	Place
Anna Rott	02	4
Jasmin Walchshofer	04	4
Vivien Barman	06	4
Philip Oezelt	07	4
Diana-Maria Krieger	08	4
Mely Pagger	09	4
Klara Jovanovic	10	4
Sarah Hager	01	3
Dominik Gassner	03	2
Lara Krause	05	1
Roman Lochmann	05	1

=== Season 16, 2010 ===
Name	Start number	Place
Celina Baudisch	01	4
Tamara Badegruber	02	4
Laurin Greiter	03	4
Jessika Brei	04	4
Paulina Vereti	05	4
Alicja Wojcik	08	4
Marcello Delpino	09	4
Laura Kamhuber	07	3
Asja Ahatovic	10	2
Dominik Schrittesser	06	1

=== Season 17, 2011 ===
Name	Start number	Place
Karyna Verba	01	4
India Callender	03	4
Sarah Bednarz	04	4
Anna Prütz	05	4
Else Mack	07	4
Michael Samek	09	4
Andrea Lienbacher	10	4
Katrin Kogler	08	3
Mathias Rodler	02	2
Celina Müllner	06	1

=== Season 18, 2012 ===
Name	Start number	Place
Joli Francisco	01	4
Lukas Rumpold	03	4
Elisabeth Preiss	04	4
Saskia Bisanz	05	4
Elena Spörl	06	4
Alex Baumgartner	08	4
Ewa-Maria Zorn	09	4
Laura Heily	07	3
Julia Rosenmayr	02	2
Michelle Idlhammer	10	1

=== Season 19, 2013 ===
Name	Start number	Place
Ronja Harsch	02	4
Jakob Silye	03	4
Siri Kotschnig	04	4
Viola Dillinger	06	4
Carina Seebacher	07	4
Amelie Gabryszak	08	4
Marcel Bodner	09	4
Olivia Goga	01	3
Vanessa Dollinger	05	2
Lisa Mikolaschek	10	1

=== Season 20, 2014 ===
Name	Start number	Place
Jessy Schiessl	01	4
Sarah Kaiser	02	4
Hanna Harkamp	06	4
Juliane Hotter	07	4
Jason Schwickerath	08	4
Estelle Lath	09	4
Marie Lang	10	4
Kilian Scheyer	03	3
Nina Hafner	05	2
Lena Tirler	04	1

=== Season 21, 2015 ===
Name	Start number	Place
Sophia Joham	01	4
Selina Gerstmayer	02	4
Emelie Missiuk	04	4
Uljana Schmal	06	4
Laura Reder	07	4
Anna Hölzl	08	4
Simon Stabauer	10	4
Markus Manzl	05	3
Paul Aschenwald	03	2
Alinah Hofstätter	09	1

=== Season 22, 2016 ===
Name	Start number	Place
Theresa Tschiggerl	02	4
Driola Haspel	04	4
Daria Tayel	05	4
Flora Turhani	06	4
Saphira Essmann	08	4
Anupam Sharma	09	4
Karina Michel	10	4
Madita Killinger	07	3
Tamia Edwards	01	2
Christian Steger	03	1

=== Season 23, 2017 ===
Name	Start number	Place
Lisa-Marie König	01	4
Niklas Lichtenegger	02	4
Isabella Schmid	03	4
Michael Heidemann	05	4
Helena Manoussaskis	07	4
Max Lehner	08	4
Susan Oseloff	10	4
Lena Balogh	06	3
Livia Ernst	04	2
Ina Hofer	09	1

=== Season 24, 2018 ===
Name	Start number	Place
Hannah Hruska	01	4
Viviana Renzl	02	4
Nils Vandeven	03	4
Mary Schönbauer	05	4
Madeleine Tosun	06	4
Mara Walter	09	4
Raschel Fischmann	10	4
Selina Pichler	08	3
Martina Szymanek	04	2
Josef Fankhauser	07	1

=== Season 25, 2019 ===
Name	Start number	Place
Alisa Berkovitch	01	4
Teodora Vio	02	4
Vanessa Deimbacher	04	4
Boti Stelczer	06	4
Ina Bahr	07	4
Daniel Slavinski	08	4
Lara Voicu	10	4
Luca Sommerauer	03	3
Helena Strasser	05	2
Katharina Felzmann	09	1

== Winner songs ==
Year	Album	Winner(s)	Song		Original	
1995	Kiddy Contest Vol. 1	Christina Kramer	Kinderzimmerdieb	Children's room thief	Achy Breaky Heart	Billy Ray Cyrus
1996	Kiddy Contest Vol. 2	Marina Schweinberger	Das erste Mal verliebt	The first time in love	Love Is All Around	Wet Wet Wet
1997	Kiddy Contest Vol. 3	Manuela Mayer	Wut	Anger	Nur geträumt	Blümchen
1998	Kiddy Contest Vol. 4	Alexandra Pötzelsberger	Nur ein Traum	Just a dream	Adesso tu	Eros Ramazzotti
1999	Kiddy Contest Vol. 5	Bernhard Arko & Daniel Pirker	Freunde wie wir	Friends like us	Y.M.C.A.	Village People
2000	Kiddy Contest Vol. 6	Daniela Vogel & Marco Klemmer	Snowboardflitzer	Snowboard speedster	Anton aus Tirol	DJ Ötzi
2001	Kiddy Contest Vol. 7	Mandy Grace Capristo	Ich wünsche mir einen Bankomat	I wish me a bankomat	Daylight in Your Eyes	No Angels
2002	Kiddy Contest Vol. 8	Laura Kästel	Ich will in die Disco geh'n	I want to go to the disco	Crying at the Discoteque	Alcazar
2003	Kiddy Contest Vol. 9	Nicki Freiberger	Mein Superstar	My superstar	We Have a Dream	DSDS
2004	Kiddy Contest Vol. 10	Lisa Aberer	Unsichtbar	Invisible	Dragostea Din Tei	O-Zone
2005	Kiddy Contest Vol. 11	Kim Steiner	Alle verknallt	Everyone has a crush	Dubi Dam Dam	Banaroo
2006	Kiddy Contest Vol. 12	Tanja Kreutmayer	Flaschengeist	Genie in a bottle	1001 Arabian Nights	Ch!pz
2007	Kiddy Contest Vol. 13	Caroline Hat	Schokoladistan	Schokoladistan	Ein Stern (...der deinen Namen trägt)	DJ Ötzi & Nik P.
2008	Kiddy Contest Vol. 14	Mira Sophia Ulz	Planet der Mädchen	Planet of the girls	Fieber	Christina Stürmer
2009	Kiddy Contest Vol. 15	Lara Krause & Roman Lochmann	Märchenwald	Fairy tale forest	Stadt	Cassandra Steen & Adel Tawil
2010	Kiddy Contest Vol. 16	Dominik Schrittesser	Bitte mehr Taschengeld	Please more pocket money	Whataya Want from Me	Adam Lambert
2011	Kiddy Contest Vol. 17	Celina Müllner	Gemüsekrise	Vegetable crisis	Higher	Taio Cruz & Kylie Minogue
2012	Kiddy Contest Vol. 18	Michelle Idlhammer	Die Wasserratten	The water rats	Call Me Maybe	Carly Rae Jepsen
2013	Kiddy Contest Vol. 19	Lisa Mikolaschek	Der Gitterbettprinz	The lattice bed prince	I Couldn't Care Less	Leslie Clio
2014	Kiddy Contest Vol. 20	Lena Tirler	Augen auf	Open eyes	Am I Wrong	Nico & Vinz
2015	Kiddy Contest Vol. 21	Alinah Hofstätter	Tausend Selfies	Thousands of selfies	Ain't Nobody (Loves Me Better)	Felix Jaehn ft. Jasmine Thompson
2016	Kiddy Contest Vol. 22	Christian Steger	Ich bleib lieber Single	I'd rather stay single	Stitches	Shawn Mendes
2017	Kiddy Contest Vol. 23	Ina Hofer	Wo versteckt sich das Christkind?	Where is the Christ child hiding?	Musik sein	Wincent Weiss
2018	Kiddy Contest Vol. 24	Josef Fankhauser	Lederhosenrapper	Lederhosen rapper	Lie to Me	Mikolas Josef
2019	Kiddy Contest Vol. 25	Katharina Felzmann	Voll die Streberin	Such a nerd	Unforgettable	Nico Santos
