= Zoë (Austrian singer) =

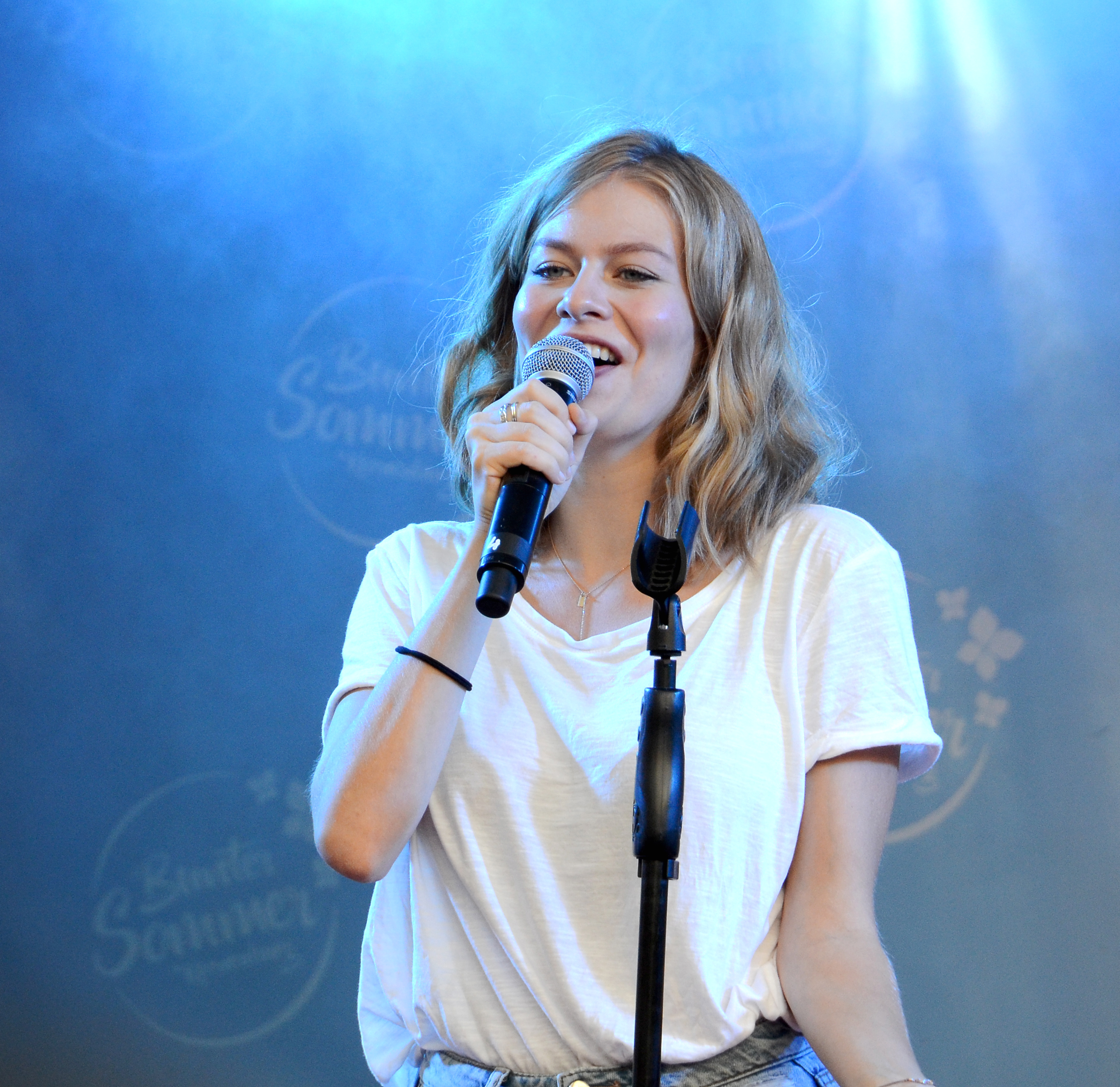
- Zoë Straub performing in Korneuburg

Background information
- Born: Zoë Lauren Straub; 1 December 1996 (age 29); Vienna, Austria
- Genres: Pop; French pop; electropop
- Occupations: Singer; songwriter; actress
- Instrument: Vocals
- Years active: 2002–present
- Label: Global Rockstar Music
- Website: zoe-official.com

Zoë Straub (German pronunciation: [ˈzoːiː ˈʃtʁaʊp]; born 1 December 1996), known professionally as Zoë (stylized in all caps), is an Austrian singer, songwriter and actress. She represented Austria in the Eurovision Song Contest 2016 with the song "Loin d'ici", placing thirteenth in the grand final.

== Life and career ==
=== 1996–2014: Early life ===
Zoë Straub was born in Vienna to musician parents, Christof and Roumina Straub (née Wilfling), on 1 December 1996.

At the age of six, she featured in a song by her parents' musical project, Papermoon, called "Doop Doop (Baby Remix)". In 2007, Straub participated in the Austrian reality singing competition Kiddy Contest, where she covered "Engel ohne Flügel", originally performed by Mark Medlock, a German singer, while she was attending the Lycée Français de Vienne (French High School of Vienna), where she studied for nine years.

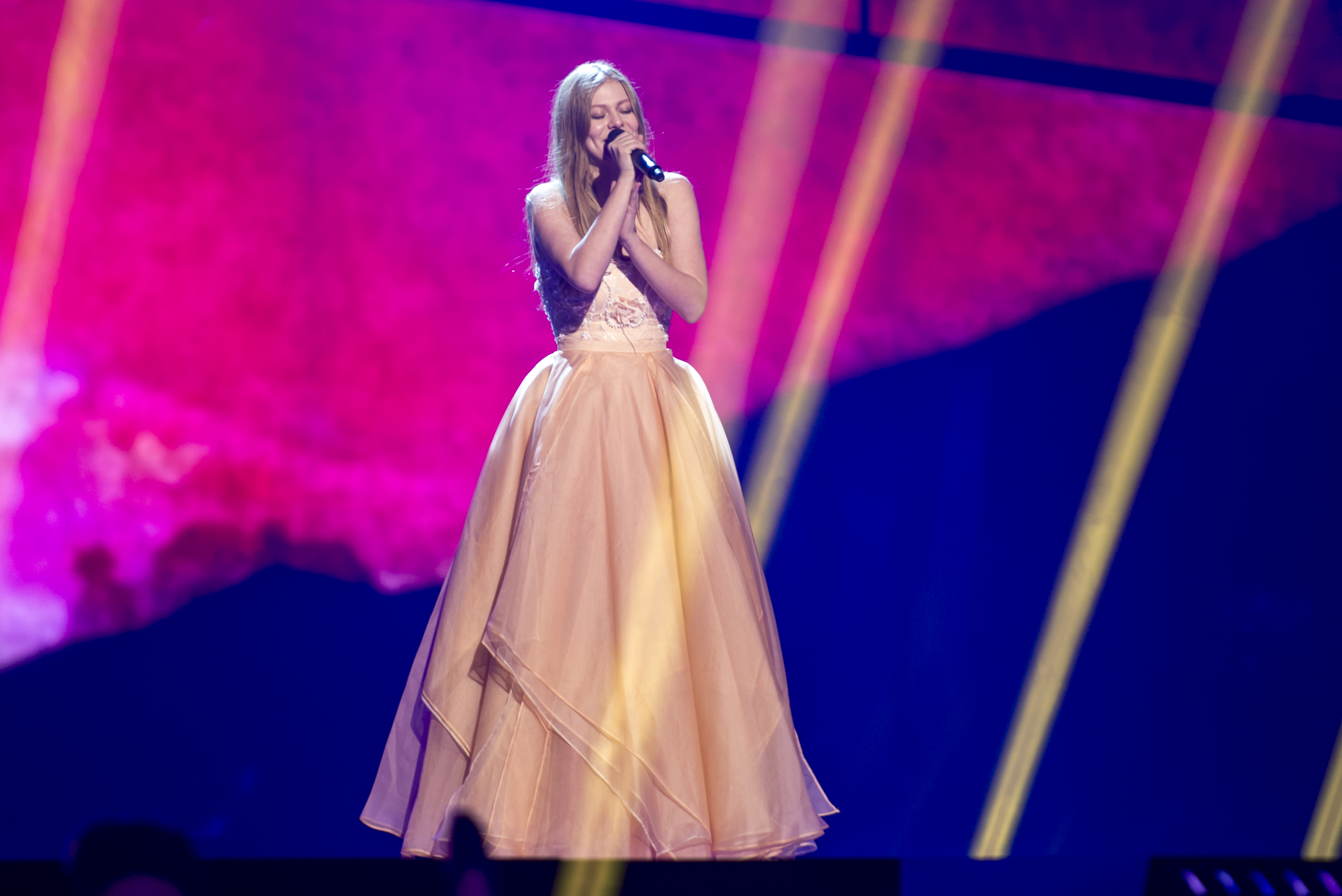
Zoe representing Austria with the song "Loin d'ici" during a rehearsal before the first semi final of the Eurovision Song Contest 2016 Stockholm.

=== 2015–2018: Career beginnings, Debut and Eurovision Song Contest ===
Straub appeared on ORF television series Vorstadtweiber in 2015. She also competed in the Austrian national final for the Eurovision Song Contest 2015, where she eventually placed third with the song "Quel filou", written by Straub herself and her father, Christof Straub. She performed live at Rathausplatz while Vienna was serving as the host city of the Eurovision Song Contest 2015. In October 2015, she released her debut album Debut.

On 12 January 2016, she was announced as one of the participants of the Austrian national final for the Eurovision Song Contest 2016, and on 12 February 2016, she emerged as the winner of the national final and therefore represented Austria in the contest with the song "Loin d'ici"; qualified for the grand final where she placed 13th in total and 8th in televoting. On 29 April 2016, she released a reissued version of Debut. In Eurovision 2017, she was a member of the Austrian jury for semi-final 2 and for the grand final. In December 2017, it was announced that she would serve as a judge in the Sammarinese national selection event for the Eurovision Song Contest 2018 a national final event she and her family funded, alongside Neon Hitch and Vince Bugg.

=== 2018–present ===
After her album Debut achieved gold status, Straub toured Austria and Europe. Her single "C'est la vie" was number 1 in Italy for many months, and also became a radio hit in some other European countries.

She also appeared in the first German Netflix production Isi & Ossi.

After her releases "Tout Paris" and "Rêverie", in 2022 she released the song "Loin d'ici (Far from Here)", a reworking with English verses of her Eurovision entry, with the support of newcomer Leonardo Davi.

== Personal life ==
Straub lives in Vienna with her husband Kaspar Leuhusen, whom she met in 2010 and married on 3 August 2022. On 4 February 2020, she gave birth to their son Viktor.

Straub's favorite television series is Close Up, which focuses on the lives of various celebrities from different fields, such as music, film, and sports. She also looks up to a range of individuals from the worlds of music, film, and fashion. Among her personal idols are Mika, Avril Lavigne and Romy Schneider.

== Discography and filmography ==
=== Discography ===
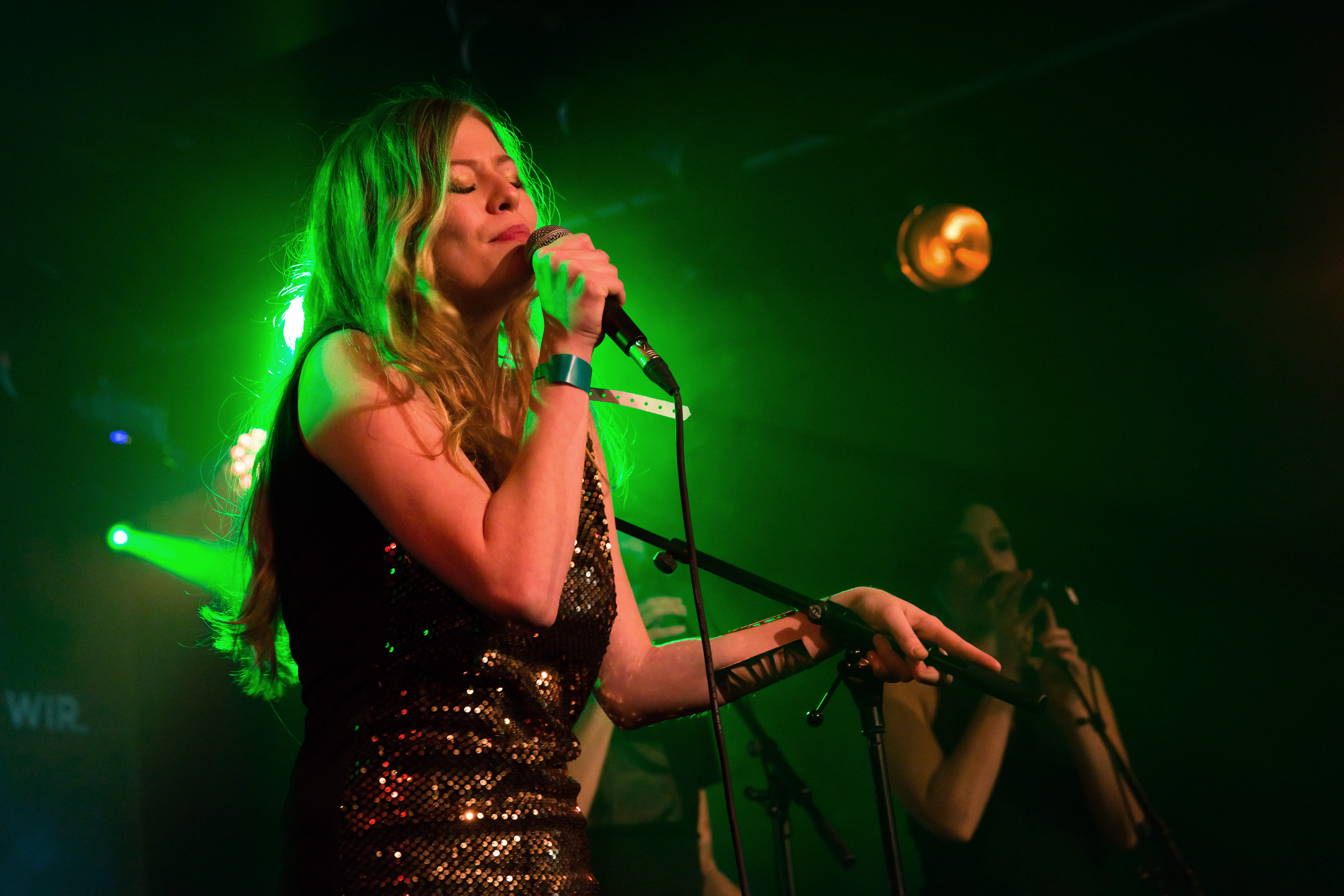
Zoë at the club concert of the Austrian national final for the Eurovision Song Contest 2015

Her debut studio album, simply titled Debut, was released on 23 October 2015 under the label Global Rockstar Music. The album reached #5 on the Austrian album charts and was certified Gold by IFPI AUT.

Zoe has released several successful singles throughout her career, starting with "Quel filou" in 2015, which reached #23 on the Austrian charts. The same year, she released "Je m'en fous" and "Mon cœur a trop aimé". In 2016, Zoe released "Loin d'ici", which peaked at #13 on the Austrian charts and #66 on the Swedish charts. She also released "La nuit des merveilles" as a non-album single that year.

In 2017, Zoe released "Dangerous Affair", followed by "C'est la vie" in 2018. In 2019, she released "C'est la vie (Remixes)", "Amour fou", and "Amour fou the Remixes" as an EP. She released "Tout Paris" in 2020, followed by "Nacht", "Tout Paris (Laibert Remix)", and "Rêverie" in 2021.

"Loin d'ici (Far from Here)", a reworking of her Eurovision entry, was released in 2022.

==== Studio albums ====
Title	Details	Peak chart positions	Certifications
Title	Details	AUT	Certifications
Debut	Released: 23 October 2015; Label: Global Rockstar Music; Formats: CD, digital download	5	IFPI AUT: Gold
La Vie en Rosé	Released: 15 November 2024; Label: Global Rockstar Music; Formats: CD, digital download	—	

==== Charted singles ====
Title	Year	Peak chart positions			Album
Title	Year	AUT	FRA	SWE	Album
"Quel filou"	2015	23	—	—	Debut
"Mon cœur a trop aimé"	2015	12	—	—	Debut
"Loin d'ici"	2016	13	99	66	Debut

=== Filmography ===
Straub made her TV debut in the series Vorstadtweiber in 2015, where she played the role of Laura in four episodes of the first season. The same year, she appeared in the mini-series "Pregau" as Rosa. In 2016, Zoe played the character of Silke Lehmann in an episode of the long-running Austrian crime series SOKO Kitzbühel. She also made a guest appearance in the sixth season of Schnell ermittelt, where she portrayed Lia Pollak in one episode. In 2018, She appeared in the comedy series Wischen ist Mach, followed by a role in the crime drama series Meiberger – Im Kopf des Täters in 2019. She then returned to the crime genre in 2021, with a guest role in an episode of Soko Donau/ Wien.

Zoe's film career began in 2020 with her role as Camilla in the romantic comedy Isi & Ossi. The same year, she also appeared in the documentary Habsburgs Coupled Daughters, where she played the role of Leopoldina. In 2021, She starred in the short film Der weiße Kobold before her role as Blanka in the 2022 film Filip.

==== Television ====
Year	Title	Role	Notes
2015	Vorstadtweiber	Laura	Series 1, episodes 4–8 (4 episodes)
2016	Pregau	Rosa	Mini series
2016	SOKO Kitzbühel	Silke Lehmann	Series 16, episode 9 (1 episode)
2017	Schnell ermittelt	Lia Pollak	Series 6, episode 3 (1 episode)
2018	Wischen ist Mach		
2019	Meiberger – Im Kopf des Täters		
2021	Soko Donau/ Wien		Series 16, episode 1 (1 episode)

==== Film ====
Year	Title	Role	Notes
2020	Isi & Ossi	Camilla	
2020	Habsburgs Coupled Daughters	Leopoldina	documentary
2021	Der weiße Kobold	Tara	
2022	Filip	Blanka	

== Awards and nominations ==
Year	Event	Category	Nominated work	Result
2016	Amadeus Austrian Music Award	Female Artist of the Year	—	Nominated
2016	Amadeus Austrian Music Award	Song of the Year	"Mon cœur a trop aimé"	Nominated

Preceded by The Makemakes with "I am Yours"	Austria in the Eurovision Song Contest; 2016	Succeeded by Nathan Trent with "Running on Air"
