= The Lovercall =

Single by The Makemakes
- Released: 15 June 2012
- Recorded: 2012
- Genre: Pop
- Length: 3:14
- Label: Almost Perfecto Records

The Makemakes singles chronology
"The Lovercall" (2012)	"Million Euro Smile" (2014)

"The Lovercall" is the debut single by Austrian pop rock band The Makemakes. It was released as a digital download in Austria on 15 June 2012. The song peaked to number 6 on the Austrian Singles Chart.

== Track listing ==
Digital download
No.	Title	Length
1.	"The Lovercall"	3:14
2.	"Killing the Director"	3:25

== Chart performance ==
=== Weekly charts ===
Chart (2012)	Peak position
Austria (Ö3 Austria Top 40)	6

== Release history ==
Region	Date	Format	Label
Austria	15 June 2012	Digital download	Almost Perfecto Records
