= Arabella Kiesbauer =

German-Austrian TV presenter, writer, and actress

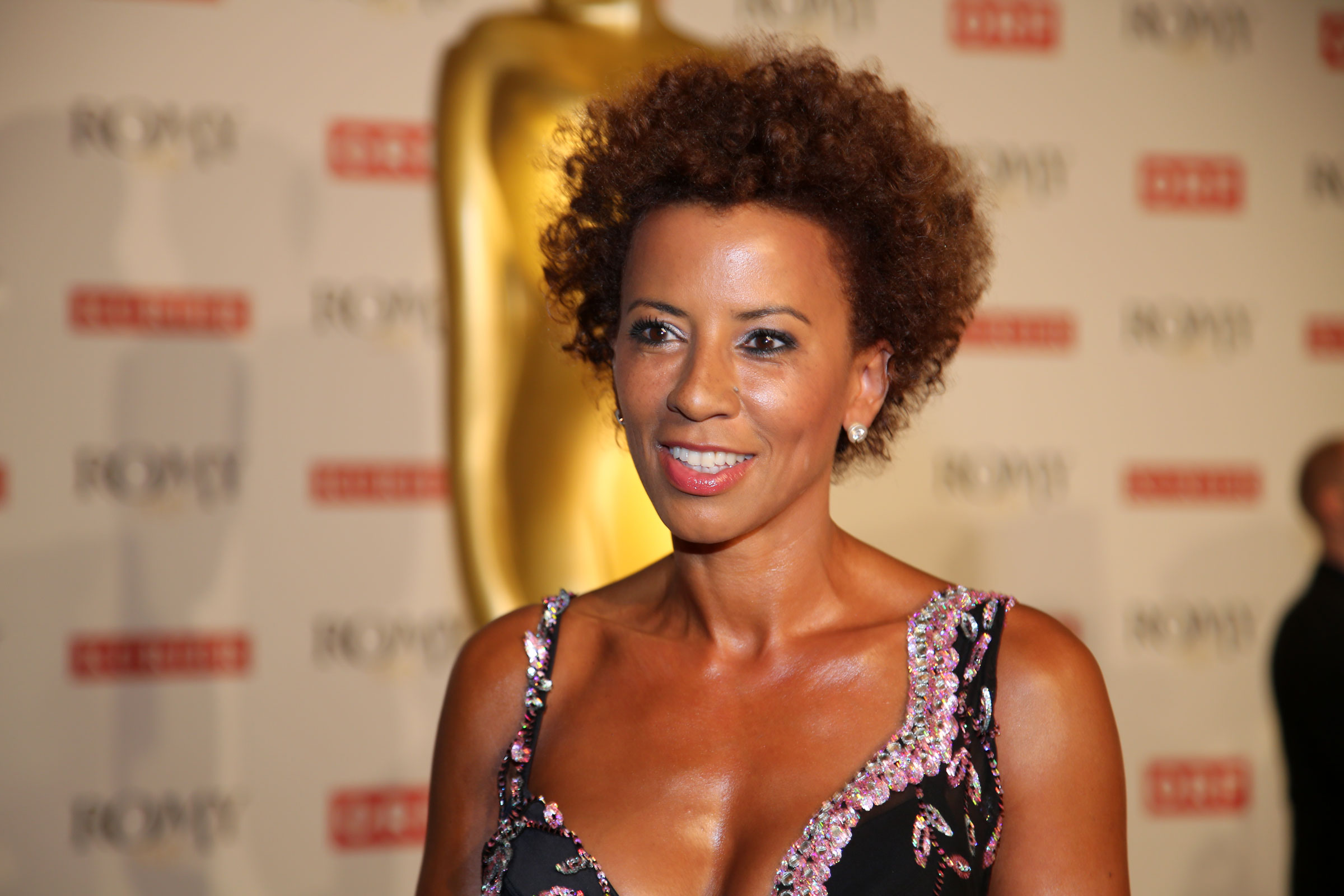
- Kiesbauer in 2015
- Born: Cosima Arabella-Asereba Kiesbauer; 8 April 1969 (age 57); Vienna, Austria
- Occupations: TV presenter; writer; actress
- Years active: 1989–present
- Known for: Hosting Arabella, Starmania, the Vienna Opera Ball and the Eurovision Song Contest 2015
- Spouse: Florens Eblinger (m. 2004)
- Children: 2
- Website: www.arabella-kiesbauer.at

Cosima Arabella-Asereba Kiesbauer (born 8 April 1969), known professionally as simply Arabella Kiesbauer, is a German-Austrian TV presenter, writer and actress.

== Career ==
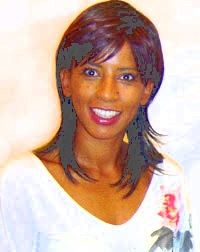
Kiesbauer at an Advent celebration in 2004

Kiesbauer began her media career as a presenter for the Austrian public service television broadcaster ORF while studying journalism and dramaturgy.

From 1994 to 2004 she hosted her own daily talk show Arabella on the German TV channel Pro7. On 17 January 2006 she started a weekly late night talk show Talk ohne Show on the Berlin TV station N24 TV. However, after 40 shows she resigned suddenly claiming that the frequent traveling between Vienna and Berlin was putting too much stress on her private life.

Kiesbauer won several awards for her TV work, in 1994 the Bavarian TV Award in the category "Beste Talk-Newcomerin" and in 1996 the media award Das Goldene Kabel. She appeared in the German Playboy on the cover and 14 pages in July 1995. Kiesbauer also works as a model and fashion ambassador for the shoe company Vögele Shoes.

On 17 December 2007, she hosted the 2007 FIFA World Player of the Year awards at the Zürich Opera House in Zurich, Switzerland with Rainer Maria Salzgeber.

On 23 May 2015, Kiesbauer hosted the Eurovision Song Contest 2015 along with Mirjam Weichselbraun and Alice Tumler at the Wiener Stadthalle in Vienna.

== Personal life ==
Kiesbauer's mother Hannelore Kiesbauer was a German theater actress, and her father Sammy Ammissah was a Ghanaian engineer. After they separated, she grew up in Vienna with her grandmother.

On 9 June 1995 she was the target of a letter bomb by the racist terrorist Franz Fuchs at the Pro7 studios. However she did not open the letter; this being done by her assistant who was subsequently injured by the bomb.

Since November 2004, Kiesbauer has been married to the Viennese businessman Florens Eblinger. They have a daughter called Nika who was born in Vienna on 2 December 2007 and a son Neo born on 19 December 2010.

== Filmography ==
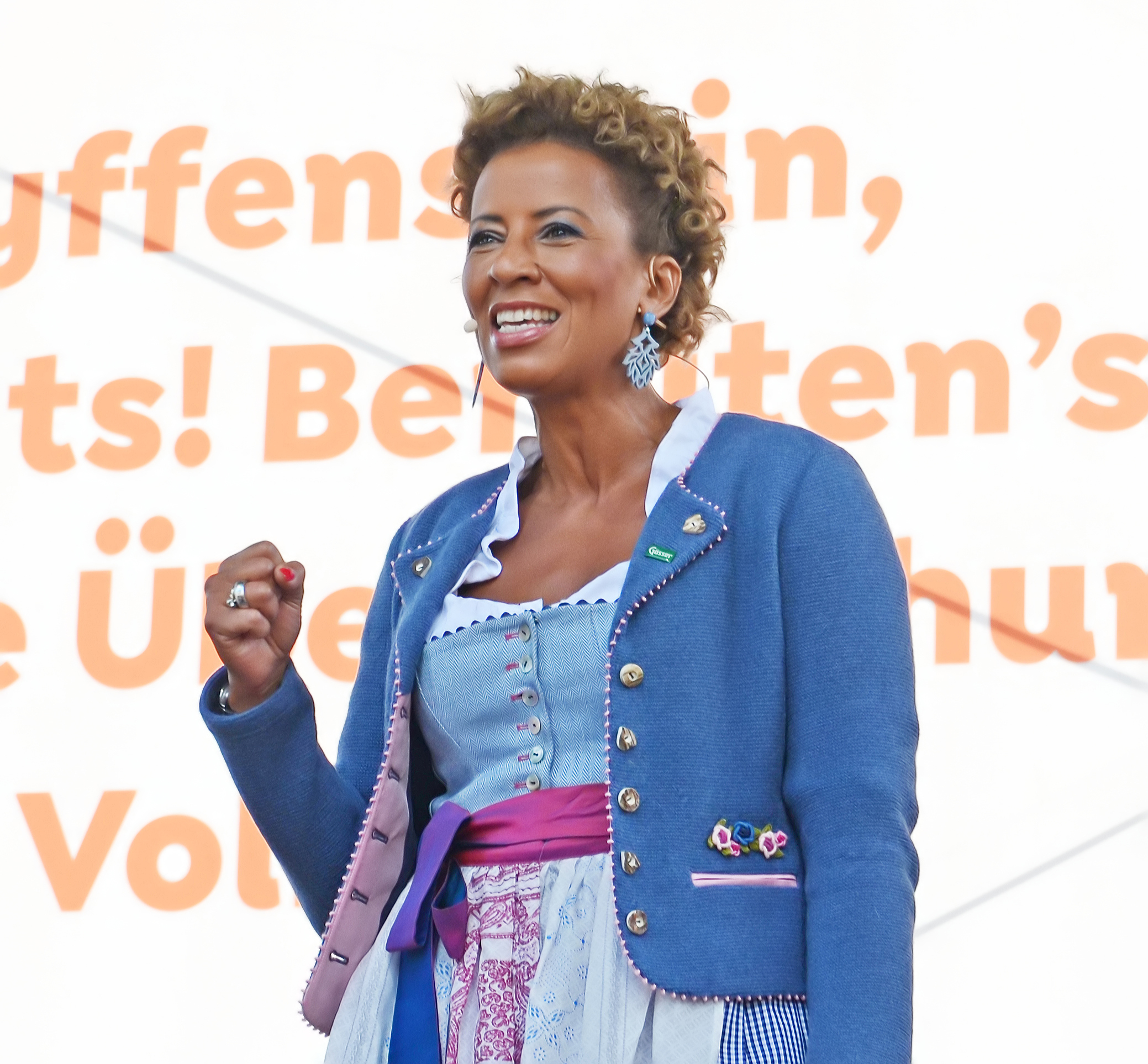
Kiesbauer in 2022

=== Television ===
Year	Title	Channel	Role
1989–1993	X-Large	ORF	Presenter
1990/1991	Inter-City	3Sat	Presenter
1991	Rund um Hollywood	ProSieben	Presenter
1994–2004	Arabella	ProSieben	Presenter
1996–97	Arabella night	ProSieben	Presenter
1996	Arabella Help!	ProSieben	Presenter
2002–04, 2006–09	Starmania	ORF1	Presenter
2003–06	Wiener Opernball	ORF1	Co-presenter
2004	Comeback – Die große Chance	ProSieben	Presenter
2004	Sound of Football	ORF	Presenter
2004	Die Austro-Pop-Show	ORF	Presenter
2005	Stars in der Manege	ARD	Presenter
2006	Arabella Kiesbauer	N24	Presenter
2012–13	Life Ball	ORF eins	Co-presenter
2012–14	Kiddy Contest	Puls 4	Presenter
2014	Bauer sucht Frau	ATV	Presenter
2015	Eurovision Song Contest 2015	ORF eins	Co-presenter
2020	The Masked Singer Austria	Puls 4	Presenter

== Books ==
- Mein Erfolgs Programm (1998 VGS Verlagsges., K) ISBN 3-8025-1360-6
- Nobody is perfect (2001 Lübbe) ISBN 3-404-14246-2
- Mein afrikanisches Herz (September 2007 Pendo Verlag GmbH) ISBN 3-86612-132-6

== Music ==
- Number one (CD 1994, Eviam Musi (DA Music), EAN 4018771410320)

1. Tonight
2. Cold Fever
3. All I Want (Classic-Mix)
4. True Love
5. No More Lonely Nights
6. Life

7. Tonight (Moonlight-Mix)
8. When The Sun Goes Down
9. No One Like You
10. All I Want (Groove-Mix)
11. What A Love
12. Still My Number One

- CD compilation Arabella Soul Night
- Girl-Power (2000, presented by Arabella Kiesbauer)
