= Arabella (talk show) =

Arabella was a German talk show hosted by Arabella Kiesbauer airing on the German television network ProSieben from 1994 to 2004. It was modeled after The Oprah Winfrey Show.
