= Quel filou =

Single by Zoë

from the album Debut
- Released: 15 March 2015
- Recorded: 2015
- Genre: Pop; French pop
- Length: 2:59
- Label: ORF-Enterprise
- Songwriters: Zoë Straub; Christof Straub

Zoë singles chronology
"Quel filou" (2015)	"Je m'en fous" (2015)

"Quel filou" (English: What a Fool) is a song by Austrian singer, songwriter, and actress Zoë (full name Zoë Straub). The song was released as a digital download on 15 March 2015 through ORF-Enterprise. It has peaked at number 23 in Austria, and was written by Zoë and Christof Straub. The song competed in Wer singt für Österreich? 2015, where it placed third.

== Live performances ==
Zoë performed the song live for the first time during the third show of Wer singt für Österreich? 2015, where it was selected as her entry into the competition. She performed the song again during the fourth show, where it placed third out of six, coming second with the jury vote and third with the televote.

== Track listing ==
Digital download
No.	Title	Length
1.	"Quel filou"	2:59

== Chart performance ==
=== Weekly charts ===
Chart (2015)	Peak position
Austria (Ö3 Austria Top 40)	23

== Release history ==
Region	Date	Format	Label
Worldwide	15 March 2015	Digital download	ORF-Enterprise
