= Laura Kamhuber =

Austrian singer (born 1999)

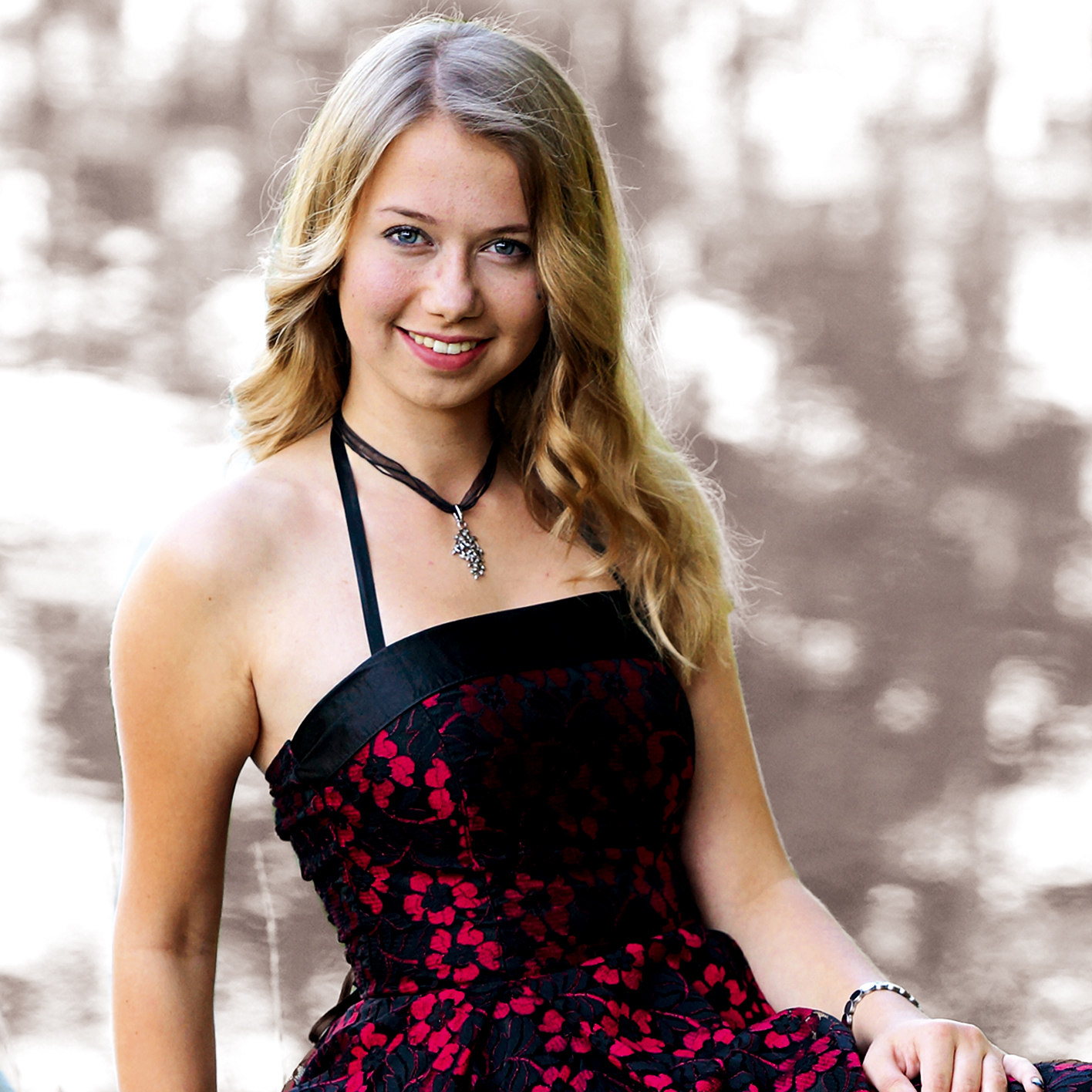
- Kamhuber in 2016

Background information
- Born: 8 August 1999 (age 26); Austria
- Origin: Amaliendorf
- Genres: volksmusik, schlager, pop
- Website: laurakamhuber.at

Laura Kamhuber (born 8 August 1999) is an Austrian singer. Her performance of Whitney Houston's "I Will Always Love You", taped when she was a 13-year-old on the 2013 German edition of The Voice Kids, is the most watched YouTube video by an Austrian artist. She has recorded three albums.

== Biography ==
Kamhuber has always loved to sing, and made her first public singing appearance at the age of three at her great-grandmother's nursing home.

From the age of ten she studied vocals at the Heidenreichstein music school. While she was still ten, she participated in the casting for the NÖN Talent Contest in April 2010. "That was my first stage performance," she recalls, "and I was very nervous." She finished second. Later in 2010, having turned eleven, she participated in the Austrian annual televised children's talent show titled Kiddy Contest where she reached the finals and finished in third place. From then on, she regularly took singing lessons and often sang at small to medium size concerts.

At a fundraiser in 2012, she sang a folk song for the first time and discovered she loved the genre. The same year she made the semifinals in another Austrian talent show, Die große Chance on ORF. At 13 she was the youngest singer in the contest.

External videos
- Laura Kamhuber sings "I Will Always Love You" during her blind audition for The Voice Kids Germany in 2013 (YouTube)

In 2013, she participated in the German edition of The Voice Kids, where she made it to the battles (or the knockout rounds) stage. Her performance of Whitney Houston's "I Will Always Love You" in the blind audition has garnered over 220 million views (as of March 2025) on YouTube, and is the most watched YouTube video by an Austrian artist. (All three judges turned and she chose to be on Lena Meyer-Landrut's team.)

Thanks to The Voice Kids she was noticed by people in the music industry and had a production team formed around her. Uwe Altenried (composer) and Peter and Gaby Wessely (lyricists) wrote the first song—"Wer Ordnung hält (...ist nur zu faul zum Suchen)"—just for her. That was followed by a record contract with Tyrolis Music. In the same year, Andy Borg invited her to sing her song on the Austrian folk music television show Musikantenstadl.

On 2 January 2014, she released her debut album Wie guat, dass i a Madl bin, which contains 12 folk songs.

In the 2015/2016 season, with the song "Stay Tonight", she made the shortlist of the Facebook (online) selection for the wildcard place in the Austrian national selection final for the Eurovision Song Contest.

In December 2016 she released her second single, titled "Wunder".

She was named youth ambassador for the UNESCO Club Austria's Gold Ribbon Campaign "Warriors and Angels" in early 2017. In late 2017 she released her third album Träume, produced by David Ritt for Ritt Sound. The album contains various styles of songs from pop music to country to soulful ballads.

== Discography ==
=== Albums ===
- 2014: Wie guat, dass i a Madl bin
- 2016: Ich glaube noch an Wunder (EP containing 5 songs)
- 2017: Träume

=== Singles ===
- 2010: "Ich bleib lieber klein" (German-language cover of Cheryl Cole's "Fight for This Love"; also included on the various artists compilation album Kiddy Contest Vol. 16)
- 2013: "Wer Ordnung hält (...ist nur zu faul zum Suchen)"
- 2016: "Stay Tonight"
- 2017: "Right Beside Me" (with Brofaction)
