= Johann Sebastian Bass =

Austrian electropop music group

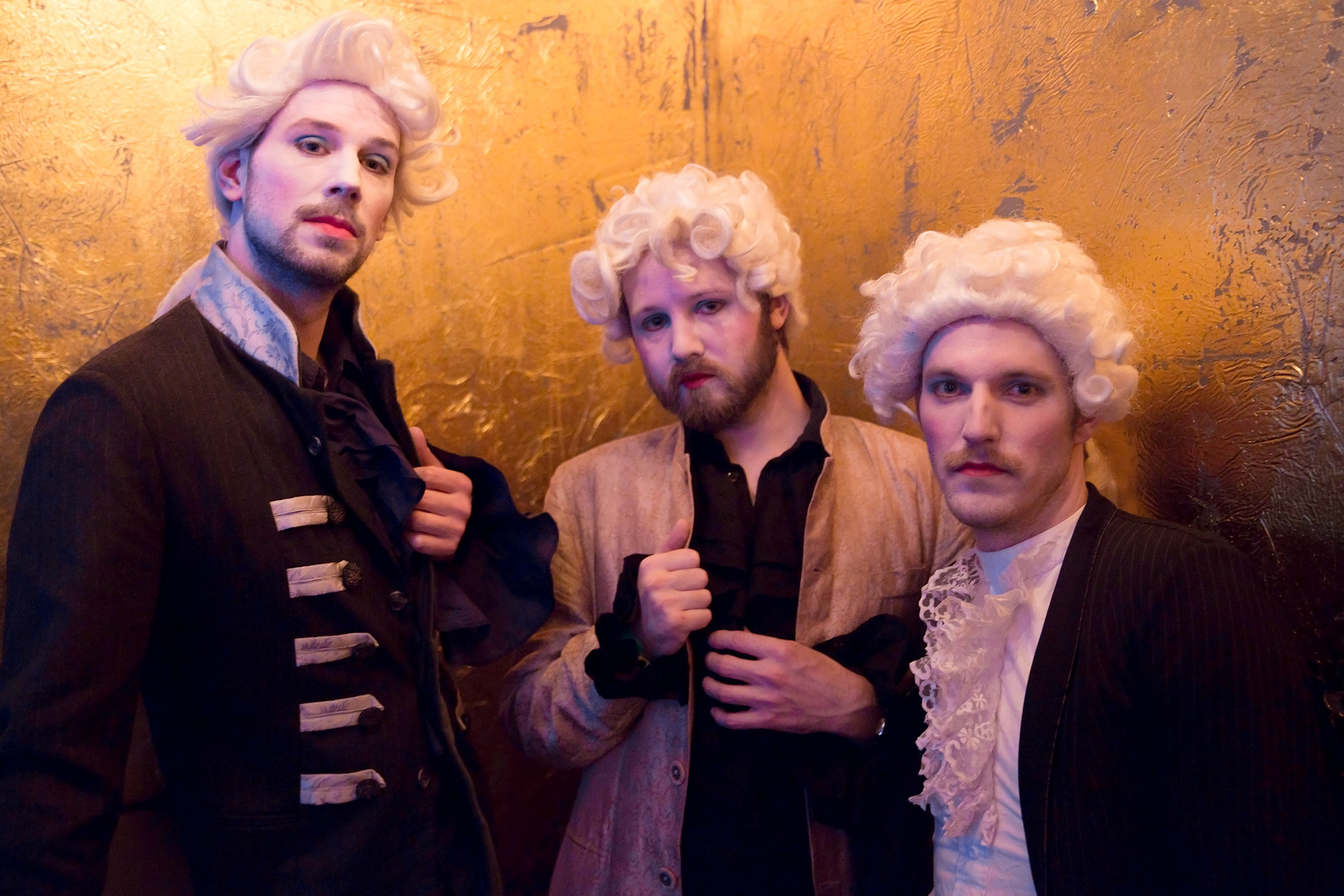
- Johann Sebastian Bass, 2015

Background information
- Origin: Vienna, Austria
- Genres: Electropop, "electrococo"
- Years active: 2011—present
- Labels: Vienna Wildstyle Recordings
- Members: "Johann Martinus Bass" (Martin; vocals, talkbox, synthesizer); "Johann Domenicus Bass" (Dominik; synthesizer, electronic harpsichord); "Johann Davidus Bass" (David; percussion, samples)
- Website: johannsebastianbass.net

Johann Sebastian Bass (also known by the abbreviation JSB) is an Austrian electropop music group formed in 2011. In 2015, it competed in Wer singt für Österreich?, the Austrian national competition to select an entrant for the Eurovision Song Contest 2015, for which Austria was the host nation. The group advanced to the final, where it placed fifth out of six contestants with the song "Absolutio".

== History ==
Formed in 2011, JSB consists of three members performing under the pseudonyms "Martinus Bass" (vocals), "Domenicus Bass" (synthesizer and electronic harpsichord), and "Davidus Bass" (percussion and samples). The band released its first EP, Cantata per una macchina, Opus 1, in 2012. Another EP, Voodoo, and the band's first album, Sugar Suite, on Vienna Wildstyle Recordings, were released in 2014.

== Style ==
The band perform in distinctive rococo-style clothing of powdered wigs, make-up and brocade waistcoats.

== Discography ==
=== Albums ===
- 2014: Sugar Suite

=== EPs ===
- 2012: Cantata per una macchina, Opus 1
- 2014: Voodoo

=== Singles ===
- 2012: "Computer Lovin"
- 2014: "Voodoo"
- 2014: "Bass"
- 2014: "Heart of Stone"
- 2015: "Absolutio"
- 2015: "Monsters"
