= The Makemakes (album) =

2015 studio album by the Makemakes

Studio album by The Makemakes
- Released: 13 May 2015
- Recorded: 2014
- Genre: Pop
- Label: Almost Perfecto Records

Singles from The Makemakes
- 1. "I Am Yours" Released: 5 March 2015

The Makemakes is the debut studio album by Austrian pop rock band The Makemakes. It was released in Austria on 13 May 2015, through Almost Perfecto Records. The album peaked at number 20 on the Austrian Albums Chart. The album includes the single "I Am Yours".

== Singles ==
"I Am Yours" was released as the lead single from the album on 5 March 2015. On 13 March 2015, the Makemakes were chosen to represent Austria in the Eurovision Song Contest 2015. The song was selected through a national final organised by the Austrian broadcaster Österreichischer Rundfunk (ORF). Austria automatically qualified to compete in the finals on 23 May 2015 due to Austria being the host nation (as they won the contest the previous year). They tied with Germany for last place with zero points.

== Track listing ==
Standard listing
No.	Title	Length
1.	"Snakes & Candy" (Intro)	0:32
2.	"Sweet Home"	3:15
3.	"Mary"	3:05
4.	"You Are Not Alone"	2:49
5.	"Merry Goodbye"	3:45
6.	"I Am Yours"	2:58
7.	"Big Bang"	2:41
8.	"Heartache"	2:59
9.	"Light in the Tunnel"	3:32
10.	"Gone for Good"	3:24
11.	"Little Is Much More"	3:40
12.	"Save Me"	3:42
13.	"Pathetic Peace Song"	5:42

== Charts ==
Chart (2015)	Peak position
Austrian Albums (Ö3 Austria)	7

== Release history ==
Region	Release date	Format	Label
Austria	13 May 2015	Digital download; CD	Almost Perfecto Records
