= Mon cœur a trop aimé =

Single by Zoë

from the album Debut
- Released: 31 July 2015
- Recorded: 2015
- Genre: Pop; French pop; electropop
- Length: 3:27
- Label: Global Rockstar Music
- Songwriters: Zoë Straub; Christof Straub

Zoë singles chronology
"Je m'en fous" (2015)	"Mon cœur a trop aimé" (2015)	"Loin d'ici" (2016)

"Mon cœur a trop aimé" (English: My Heart Loved Too Much) is a song by Austrian singer, songwriter, and actress Zoë (full name Zoë Straub). The song was released as a digital download on 31 July 2015 through Global Rockstar Music. It has peaked at number 12 in Austria, becoming her best-charting single, and was written by Zoë and Christof Straub. The song was nominated for Song of the Year at the 2016 Amadeus Austrian Music Awards.

== Music video ==
The song's official music video was released on 3 August 2015. It was directed by Stefan Tauber and Ramon Rigoni.

== Track listing ==
Digital download
No.	Title	Length
1.	"Mon cœur a trop aimé"	3:27

== Chart performance ==
=== Weekly charts ===
Chart (2015)	Peak position
Austria (Ö3 Austria Top 40)	12

== Release history ==
Region	Date	Format	Label
Worldwide	31 July 2015	Digital download	Global Rockstar Music

== Covered by ==
Title	Year	Covered by
Het neemt je mee	2018	Eveline Cannoot
Hide My Love Away	2021	RISINGBLUE feat. Ashley Lara
