= I Am Yours (song) =

2015 song by The Makemakes

Single by The Makemakes

from the album The Makemakes
- Released: 6 March 2015
- Recorded: 2014
- Length: 3:00
- Label: ORF-Enterprise
- Songwriter(s): Jimmy Harry; Dominic Muhrer; Paul Estrela; Florian Meindl; Markus Christ
- Producer(s): Jimmy Harry

The Makemakes singles chronology
"Million Euro Smile" (2014)	"I Am Yours" (2015)	"Keep On Moving" (2018)

Eurovision Song Contest 2015 entry
- Country: Austria
- Artist(s): The Makemakes
- Language: English
- Composer(s): Jimmy Harry, Dominic Muhrer, Paul Estrela, Florian Meindl, Markus Christ
- Lyricist(s): Jimmy Harry, Dominic Muhrer, Paul Estrela, Florian Meindl, Markus Christ

Finals performance
- Final result: 26th
- Final points: 0

Entry chronology
- ◄ "Rise Like a Phoenix" (2014)
- "Loin d'ici" (2016) ►

"I Am Yours" is a song performed by the Austrian band The Makemakes. The song represented Austria in the Eurovision Song Contest 2015 where it finished last place, scoring zero points and therefore becoming the first host country in the history of the contest to score no points. It was released as a digital download in Austria on 6 March 2015 as the lead single for their debut, the self-titled studio album The Makemakes (2015). The song was written by Jimmy Harry, Dominic Muhrer, Paul Estrela, Florian Meindl, and Markus Christ. The song has peaked at number 2 on the Austrian Singles Chart.

== Live performances ==
The song was performed for the first time during show 3 of Wer singt für Österreich?, the Austrian national selection process for the Eurovision Song Contest 2015 held in Vienna, Austria. It was one of the two potential songs by the Makemakes for Eurovision, along with "Big Bang". "I Am Yours" advanced to the final, where it was performed again. Eventually, The Makemakes were selected to represent Austria in the Eurovision Song Contest 2015. On 23 May 2015, The Makemakes performed the song live during the finals of the Eurovision Song Contest 2015 at the Wiener Stadthalle in Vienna, Austria, garnering about zero points. It is the first Eurovision song from a host country to have done so. They later released a video on Twitter of them parodying the winning song, changing the lyrics to "We are the zeroes of our time".

The Eurovision performance was memorable for the appearance of a piano on stage that was designed to burst into flames midway through the song. This was one of the many Eurovision moments referenced in the parody song "Love Love Peace Peace," performed during the interval of the 2016 Eurovision final.

== Charts ==
Chart performance for "I Am Yours"
Chart (2015)	Peak position
Austria (Ö3 Austria Top 40)	2
Iceland (Tónlistinn)	35

== Release history ==
Release history and formats for "I Am Yours"
Region	Date	Format	Label
Austria	6 March 2015	Digital download	ORF-Enterprise
