= Austria in the Eurovision Song Contest 2015 =

- Eurovision Song Contest 2015
- Participating broadcaster: Österreichischer Rundfunk (ORF)
- Country: Austria
- Selection process: Wer singt für Österreich?
- Selection date: 13 March 2015

Competing entry
- Song: "I Am Yours"
- Artist: The Makemakes
- Songwriters: Jimmy Harry; Dominic Muhrer; Paul Estrela; Florian Meindl; Markus Christ

Placement
- Final result: 26th, 0 points

Participation chronology

Austria was represented at the Eurovision Song Contest 2015 with the song "I Am Yours", written by Jimmy Harry, Dominic Muhrer, Paul Estrela, Florian Meindl, and Markus Christ, and performed by the band The Makemakes. The Austrian participating broadcaster, Österreichischer Rundfunk (ORF), organised the national final Wer singt für Österreich? in order to select its entry for the contest. In addition, ORF was also the host broadcaster and staged the event at the Hall D of the Wiener Stadthalle in Vienna, after winning the previous edition with the song "Rise Like a Phoenix" performed by Conchita Wurst.

In the national final, sixteen artists competed over three televised shows resulting in the selection of six finalists with a potential Eurovision song each. In the final, ten international juries and a public vote first selected the top two entries to proceed to a second round of voting. In the second round, "I Am Yours" performed by The Makemakes was selected as the winner after gaining 78% of the votes from a public vote.

As the host country, Austria qualified to compete directly in the final of the Eurovision Song Contest. Austria's running order position was determined by draw. Performing in position 14 during the final, Austria placed twenty-sixth out of the 27 participating countries and failed to score any points. This was the fourth time the nation received nul points in the history of the competition.

== Background ==
Prior to the 2015 contest, Österreichischer Rundfunk (ORF) had participated in the Eurovision Song Contest representing Austria forty-seven times since its first entry in 1957. It has won the contest on two occasions: in 1966 with the song "Merci, Chérie" performed by Udo Jürgens and in 2014 with the song "Rise Like a Phoenix" performed by Conchita Wurst. Following the introduction of semi-finals for the 2004 contest, it has featured in only three finals. Its least successful result has been last place, which they have achieved on eight occasions, most recently in 2012. It has also received nul points on three occasions; in 1962, 1988, and 1991.

As part of its duties as participating broadcaster, ORF organises the selection of its entry in the Eurovision Song Contest and broadcasts the event in the country. From 2011 to 2013, ORF set up national finals with several artists to choose both the song and performer to compete at Eurovision, with both the public and a panel of jury members involved in the selection. For the 2014 contest, ORF held an internal selection to choose the artist and song to represent Austria at the contest. On 26 September 2014, the broadcaster announced that its entry for the 2015 contest would be selected through a national final.

== Before Eurovision ==
=== Wer singt für Österreich? ===
Wer singt für Österreich? (Who sings for Austria?) was the national final that selected the Austrian entry for the Eurovision Song Contest 2015. The competition consisted of a four-week-long process that commenced on 20 February 2015 and concluded with a winning song and artist during the final on 13 March 2015. All shows took place at the ORF Center in Vienna, hosted by Mirjam Weichselbraun and broadcast on ORF eins as well as streamed online via ORF's official website.

==== Format ====
Three pre-recorded shows were aired on 20 February, 27 February and 6 March 2015. Sixteen artists competed in the first show where an expert jury panel selected the top six to advance in the competition. The second show was a non-competitive showcase show where the six remaining artists showcased their vocal skills and talent. The six artists each performed two candidate Eurovision songs in the third show where an expert jury panel selected one song per artist for the final on 13 March 2015. The six artists performed their selected songs in the final where the winner was selected over two rounds of voting. In the first round, public voting and ten international juries consisting of five members each selected the top two entries to advance to the second round. Viewers were able to vote via telephone or SMS and both the jury and public distributed points based on overall ranking as follows: 5 (lowest), 6, 7, 8, 10 and 12 (highest). After the combination of the jury and public votes, the top two entries proceeded to the second round where the winner was selected exclusively by public voting.

During the shows, four coaches provided commentary and feedback to the artists. The coaches were:

- Anna F. – singer-songwriter and musician
- Nazar – rapper
- Alec Völkel – member of German band The BossHoss
- Sascha Vollmer – member of German band The BossHoss

==== Competing entries ====
Sixteen artists were nominated by a team of music experts led by Anna F. and Alex Deutsch, which were revealed on 2 December 2014. After the six finalists were selected, the artists participated in a week-long songwriting camp held at the Schloss Wasserburg in St. Pölten where they worked with the coaches and a songwriting team to create their two candidate Eurovision songs. Among the members of the songwriting team were Julie Frost (wrote Germany's Eurovision Song Contest 2010 winning song "Satellite"), Jimmy Harry (producer of hits for Bruno Mars, Pink and Madonna), Lukas Hillebrand and Wolfgang Schlögel (I-Wolf das Projekt).

==== Shows ====
The first three shows aired on 20 February, 27 February and 6 March 2015. Each of the sixteen artists performed an original song or a cover version of a hit international song in the first show where the top six were selected by the votes from a jury panel. The members of the expert panel were Dietmar Lienbacher (Head of Sony Music Austria), Diana Lueger (singer, member of the band Zweitfrau), Andi Knoll (Austrian commentator for the Eurovision Song Contest), and music experts Eberhard Forcher and Dunja Stachl. Each of the six finalists performed two original songs or cover versions of hit international songs in the second show and an advisory audience vote selected Celina Ann, Folkshilfe and The Makemakes as the top three. The six finalists performed their two candidate Eurovision songs in the third show and the coaches selected one song per artist to proceed to the final.

Show 1 – 20 February 2015
R/O	Artist	Song (Original artists)	Result
1	The Makemakes	"Million Euro Smile"	Advanced
2	Clara Blume	"Love & Starve"	—N/a
3	Royal Kombo	"Ram Pam Pam"	—N/a
4	Dawa	"On the Run"	Advanced
5	Zoë	"Adieu"	Advanced
6	Renato Unterberg	"Love"	—N/a
7	The Su'sis	"This and That"	—N/a
8	Lemo	"So leicht"	—N/a
9	Mizgebonez	"Murmeltier" / "Fitnesstraining"	—N/a
10	Kathi Kallauch	"Das Leben ist zu kurz"	—N/a
11	Folkshilfe	"Seit a poa Tog"	Advanced
12	Kommando Elefant	"Mein Design fürs Leben"	—N/a
13	Tandem	"Zeig ihn mir"	—N/a
14	Celina Ann	"I Never Loved a Man (The Way I Love You)" (Aretha Franklin)	Advanced
15	wo/Men	"Happy" (Pharrell Williams)	—N/a
16	Johann Sebastian Bass	"Heart of Stone"	Advanced

Show 2 – 27 February 2015
R/O	Artist	Song (original artists)
1	The Makemakes	"I Shot the Sheriff" (Bob Marley)
2	Celina Ann	"Empire State of Mind (Part II) Broken Down" (Alicia Keys)
3	Dawa	"Bitter Sweet Symphony" (The Verve)
4	Folkshilfe	"Schranz 5 (mashup)" (various artists) (Note: "Just the Way You Are" (Bruno Mars) / "Let's Get Loud" (Jennifer Lopez) / "Hangover" (Taio Cruz feat. Flo Rida) / "Danza Kuduro" (Don Omar feat. Lucenzo) / "Monsta" (Culcha Candela) / "Sexy and I Know It" (LMFAO) / "Firework" (Katy Perry))
5	Zoë	"Something" (The Beatles)
6	Johann Sebastian Bass	"Stronger" (Kanye West)
7	Celina Ann	"Roxanne" (The Police)
8	Folkshilfe	"Loss da helfn"
9	Dawa	"Saloon"
10	Johann Sebastian Bass	"Marmalade Skies"
11	Zoë	"On My Own" (Samantha Barks)
12	The Makemakes	"Blauschkopf"

Show 3 – 6 March 2015
R/O	Artist	Song	Songwriter(s)	Result
1	The Makemakes	"Big Bang"	Jimmy Harry, Breana Kennedy, Danielle Brisebois, Tony Kanal	—N/a
2	Celina Ann	"When I Fall"	Ian Dench, Sharon Vaughn, Celina Ann Seilinger	—N/a
3	Dawa	"If You Return"	John Dawa, Laura Pudelek, Oama Richson, Barbara Wiesinger	—N/a
4	Folkshilfe	"Ned au"	Florian Ritt, Mathias Kaineder, Gabriel Haider	—N/a
5	Johann Sebastian Bass	"Monsters"	Johann Domenicus Bass, Johann Martinus Bass, Johann Davidus Bass, Wolfgang Schlögl	—N/a
6	Zoë	"My Heart Still Beats"	Zoë Straub, Christof Straub	—N/a
7	Dawa	"Feel Alive"	John Dawa, Barbara Wiesinger, Laura Pudelek, Oama Richson, Jimmy Harry, Patrick Pulsinger	Advanced
8	Johann Sebastian Bass	"Absolutio"	Johann Domenicus Bass, Johann Martinus Bass, Johann Davidus Bass, Wolfgang Schlögl	Advanced
9	Celina Ann	"Utopia"	Ian Dench, Sharon Vaughn, Celina Ann Seilinger	Advanced
10	The Makemakes	"I Am Yours"	Jimmy Harry, Dominic Muhrer, Paul Estrela, Florian Meindl, Markus Christ	Advanced
11	Zoë	"Quel filou"	Zoë Straub, Christof Straub	Advanced
12	Folkshilfe	"Who You Are"	Julie Frost, Vlado Dzihan, Florian Ritt, Mathias Kaineder, Gabriel Haider	Advanced

==== Final ====
The televised final took place on 13 March 2015. Six songs competed in the first round where the top two were selected by the combination of votes from ten international juries and a public vote to proceed to the second round. The top two were "Feel Alive" performed by Dawa and "I Am Yours" performed by The Makemakes. In the second round, public televoting selected "I Am Yours" performed by The Makemakes as the winner. In addition to the performances of the competing entries, Eurovision Song Contest 2014 winner Conchita Wurst performed her new single "Unstoppable".

First Round – 13 March 2015
R/O	Artist	Song	Jury		Televote		Total	Place
R/O	Artist	Song	Votes	Points	Percentage	Points	Total	Place
1	Folkshilfe	"Who You Are"	67	7	11.31%	7	14	4
2	Zoë	"Quel filou"	103	10	11.32%	8	18	3
3	Dawa	"Feel Alive"	79	8	14.35%	10	18	2
4	Celina Ann	"Utopia"	60	5	2.94%	5	10	6
5	Johann Sebastian Bass	"Absolutio"	64	6	8.92%	6	12	5
6	The Makemakes	"I Am Yours"	107	12	51.15%	12	24	1

Detailed International Jury Votes
R/O	Song	Latvia	France	Australia	Netherlands	Spain	Israel	United Kingdom	Germany	Slovenia	Italy	Total
R/O	Song	Latvia	France	Australia	Netherlands	Spain	Israel	United Kingdom	Germany	Slovenia	Italy	Total
1	"Who You Are"	6	5	6	5	6	6	12	8	6	7	67
2	"Quel filou"	12	10	7	12	10	12	8	10	12	10	103
3	"Feel Alive"	10	8	10	8	7	8	6	7	7	8	79
4	"Utopia"	5	7	5	6	8	7	7	5	5	5	60
5	"Absolutio"	8	6	8	7	5	5	5	6	8	6	64
6	"I Am Yours"	7	12	12	10	12	10	10	12	10	12	107

Second Round – 13 March 2015
R/O	Artist	Song	Televote	Place
1	Dawa	"Feel Alive"	22%	2
2	The Makemakes	"I Am Yours"	78%	1

==== Ratings ====
Viewing figures by show
Show	Date	Viewing figures		Ref.
Show	Date	Nominal	Share	Ref.
Show 1	20 February 2015	391,000	15%	
Show 2	27 February 2015	337,000	13%	
Show 3	6 March 2015	375,000	14%	
Final (Part 1)	13 March 2015	445,000	17%	
Final (Part 2)	13 March 2015	596,000	26%	

=== Promotion ===
The Makemakes made several appearances across Europe to specifically promote "I Am Yours" as the Austrian Eurovision entry. On 18 April, The Makemakes performed during the Eurovision in Concert event which was held at the Melkweg venue in Amsterdam, Netherlands and hosted by Cornald Maas and Edsilia Rombley. On 26 April, The Makemakes performed during the London Eurovision Party, which was held at the Café de Paris venue in London, United Kingdom and hosted by Nicki French and Paddy O'Connell. The Makemakes also completed promotional activities in the Czech Republic, Estonia, Hungary, Poland, Romania, Russia, Serbia and Slovenia as part of the campaign Vienna 12 Points. In addition to their international appearances, The Makemakes performed during the ORF 2 programme Die Brieflos Show on 22 March.

== At Eurovision ==
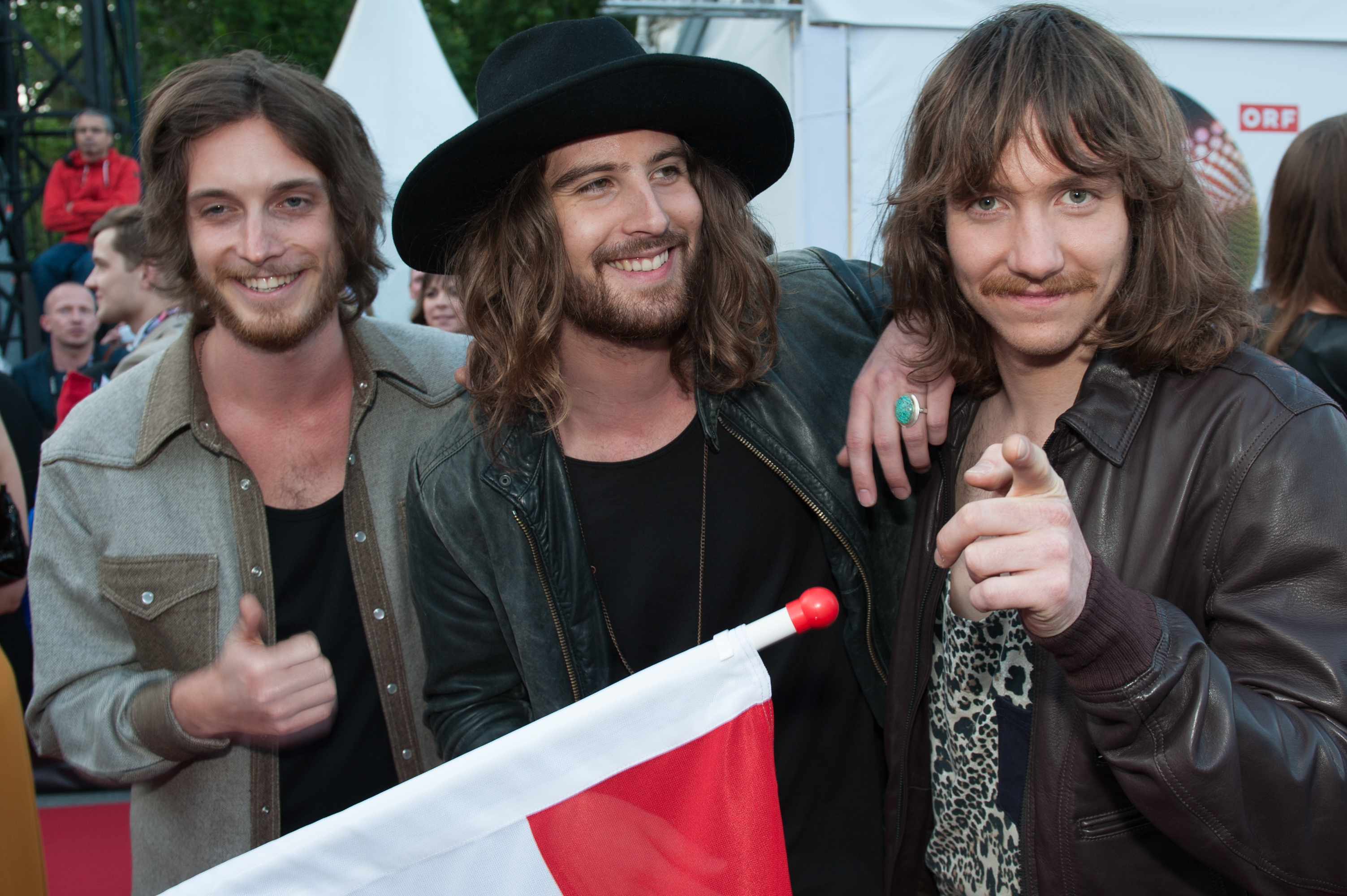
The Makemakes at the Eurovision Song Contest opening ceremony

All countries except the "Big Five" (France, Germany, Italy, Spain and the United Kingdom) and the host country, are required to qualify from one of two semi-finals in order to compete for the final; the top ten countries from each semi-final progress to the final. In the 2015 contest, Australia also competed directly in the final as an invited guest nation. As the host country, Austria automatically qualified to compete in the final on 14 May 2016. In addition to their participation in the final, Austria is also required to broadcast and vote in one of the two semi-finals. During the semi-final allocation draw on 26 January 2015, Austria was assigned to broadcast and vote in the first semi-final on 19 May 2015.

The two semi-finals and the final were broadcast in Austria on ORF eins with commentary by Andi Knoll. ORF appointed Kati Bellowitsch as its spokesperson to announce the Austrian votes during the final.

=== Final ===
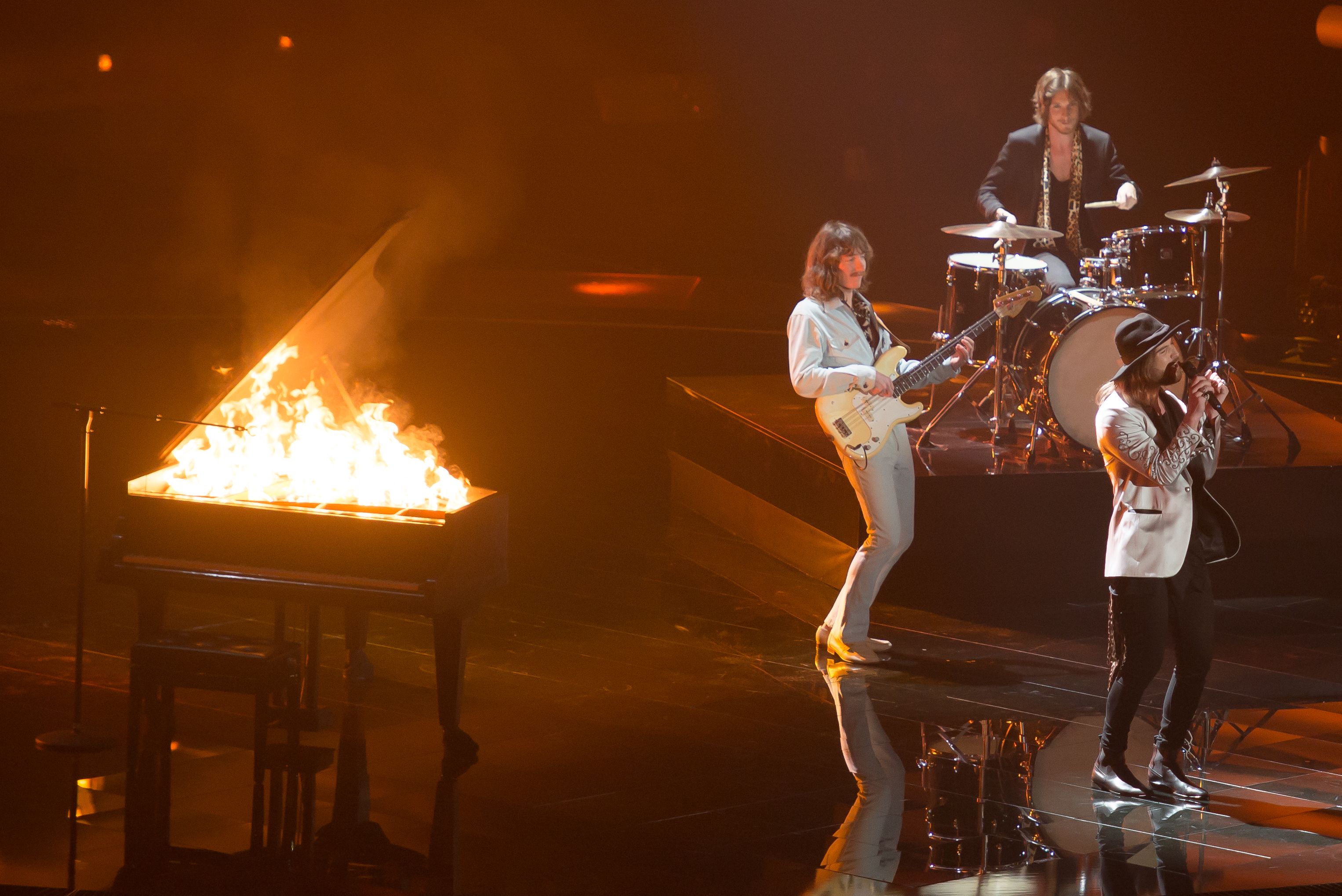
The Makemakes during a rehearsal before the final

The Makemakes took part in technical rehearsals on 17 and 20 May, followed by dress rehearsals on 22 and 23 May. This included the jury final on 22 May where the professional juries of each country watched and voted on the competing entries. As the host nation, Austria's running order position in the final was decided through a random draw that took place during the Heads of Delegation meeting in Vienna on 16 March 2015. Austria was drawn to perform in position 14. Following the second semi-final, the shows' producers decided upon the running order of the final rather than through another draw, so that similar songs were not placed next to each other. While Austria had already been drawn to perform in position 14, it was determined that Austria would perform following Belgium and before the entry from Greece.

The Austrian performance featured the members of The Makemakes, dressed in a black and white outfits, performing in a band set-up on a predominantly dark stage accompanied by bronze stage lighting. During the performance, lead vocalist of the band Dominic Muhrer was seated at a piano which set on fire at the final chorus of the song. The Makemakes was joined by three off-stage backing vocalists: Chris Coras, Harald Baumgartner and Regina Mallinger. Austria placed twenty-sixth in the final, failing to score any points. The nation initially tied with Germany as both countries finished with zero points, however, due to a tiebreaker rule that favours the song performed earliest in the running order, Austria was placed twenty-sixth, while Germany placed twenty-seventh. This was the fourth time Austria received nul points. In response to receiving zero points, the group later recorded a parody video singing the winning song "Heroes", changing the lyrics to "We are the zeroes of our time".

=== Voting ===
Voting during the three shows consisted of 50 percent public televoting and 50 percent from a jury deliberation. The jury consisted of five music industry professionals who were citizens of the country they represent, with their names published before the contest to ensure transparency. This jury was asked to judge each contestant based on: vocal capacity; the stage performance; the song's composition and originality; and the overall impression by the act. In addition, no member of a national jury could be related in any way to any of the competing acts in such a way that they cannot vote impartially and independently. The individual rankings of each jury member were released shortly after the grand final.

Following the release of the full split voting by the EBU after the conclusion of the competition, it was revealed that Austria had placed twenty-seventh (last) with the public televote and thirteenth with the jury vote. In the public vote, Austria scored 0 points and in the jury vote the nation scored 40 points.

Below is a breakdown of points awarded to Austria and awarded by Austria in the first semi-final and grand final of the contest, and the breakdown of the jury voting and televoting conducted during the two shows:

==== Points awarded to Austria ====
Austria did not receive any points at the 2015 Eurovision Song Contest.

==== Points awarded by Austria ====
Points awarded by Austria (Semi-final 1)
Score	Country
12 points	Russia
10 points	Estonia
8 points	Romania
7 points	Serbia
6 points	Belgium
5 points	Hungary
4 points	Greece
3 points	Albania
2 points	Georgia
1 point	Denmark

Points awarded by Austria (Final)
Score	Country
12 points	Australia
10 points	Italy
8 points	Russia
7 points	Sweden
6 points	Estonia
5 points	Belgium
4 points	Norway
3 points	Serbia
2 points	Israel
1 point	Latvia

==== Detailed voting results ====
The following members comprised the Austrian jury:

- Gary Lux (jury chairperson) – producer, writer, composer, singer, musician, represented Austria in the 1983 contest as part of Westend, the 1985 contest and the 1987 contest
- Manuel Ortega – singer-songwriter, represented Austria in the 2002 contest
- Christian Deix – singer-songwriter, producer, arranger, actor, journalist
- Vanessa Legenstein (Como) – singer-songwriter, composer, pianist, musician
- Franziska Trost – music journalist

Detailed voting results from Austria (Semi-final 1)
R/O	Country	G. Lux	M. Ortega	C. Deix	Como	F. Trost	Jury Rank	Televote Rank	Combined Rank	Points
01	Moldova	10	15	9	12	9	12	12	14	
02	Armenia	13	10	12	16	14	15	6	12	
03	Belgium	5	6	5	1	3	4	8	5	6
04	Netherlands	2	7	3	2	7	5	15	11	
05	Finland	16	16	16	13	16	16	9	15	
06	Greece	3	5	4	4	4	3	11	7	4
07	Estonia	4	3	1	6	1	1	7	2	10
08	Macedonia	11	4	14	14	13	13	13	16	
09	Serbia	12	12	6	15	8	10	1	4	7
10	Hungary	14	11	15	8	6	11	3	6	5
11	Belarus	9	2	8	10	10	7	16	13	
12	Russia	1	1	7	5	2	2	5	1	12
13	Denmark	6	14	2	3	5	6	14	10	1
14	Albania	15	8	10	11	15	14	4	8	3
15	Romania	8	9	13	7	12	8	2	3	8
16	Georgia	7	13	11	9	11	9	10	9	2

Detailed voting results from Austria (Final)
R/O	Country	G. Lux	M. Ortega	C. Deix	Como	F. Trost	Jury Rank	Televote Rank	Combined Rank	Points
01	Slovenia	11	11	11	20	7	11	14	11	
02	France	12	20	23	19	16	19	25	25	
03	Israel	13	6	18	24	12	13	9	9	2
04	Estonia	6	4	6	9	3	4	10	5	6
05	United Kingdom	17	22	21	25	20	24	23	26	
06	Armenia	25	23	25	23	25	25	17	23	
07	Lithuania	22	8	10	12	15	12	24	20	
08	Serbia	24	10	20	21	17	20	2	8	3
09	Norway	5	7	5	7	4	5	12	7	4
10	Sweden	3	2	1	4	2	2	6	4	7
11	Cyprus	9	14	4	11	9	9	16	12	
12	Australia	1	1	2	2	1	1	3	1	12
13	Belgium	8	21	8	1	6	8	8	6	5
14	Austria									
15	Greece	4	12	12	13	14	10	26	21	
16	Montenegro	18	15	17	22	24	22	22	24	
17	Germany	15	25	14	10	21	16	18	17	
18	Poland	21	24	16	14	19	21	13	16	
19	Latvia	7	9	9	6	10	7	15	10	1
20	Romania	19	17	24	18	22	23	7	14	
21	Spain	14	13	15	15	18	14	21	18	
22	Hungary	23	19	19	5	11	15	11	13	
23	Georgia	16	18	13	16	23	17	19	19	
24	Azerbaijan	20	16	22	17	13	18	20	22	
25	Russia	2	3	7	3	5	3	4	3	8
26	Albania	26	26	26	26	26	26	5	15	
27	Italy	10	5	3	8	8	6	1	2	10
