= Million Euro Smile =

Single by The Makemakes
- Released: 15 April 2014
- Recorded: 2013/14
- Genre: Pop
- Length: 3:27
- Label: Almost Perfecto Records

The Makemakes singles chronology
"The Lovercall" (2012)	"Million Euro Smile" (2014)	"I Am Yours" (2015)

"Million Euro Smile" is a song by Austrian pop rock band The Makemakes. It was released as a digital download in Austria on 15 April 2014. The song peaked at number 2 on the Austrian Singles Chart.

== Track listing ==
Digital download
No.	Title	Length
1.	"Million Euro Smile"	3:27

== Chart performance ==
=== Weekly charts ===
Chart (2014)	Peak position
Austria (Ö3 Austria Top 40)	2

== Release history ==
Region	Date	Format	Label
Austria	15 April 2014	Digital download	Almost Perfecto Records
