= Loin d'ici =

2016 song by Zoe

Single by Zoë

from the album Debut
- Released: 5 February 2016
- Recorded: 2015
- Genre: Pop; French pop; electropop
- Length: 4:18 (album version); 3:00 (single version)
- Label: Global Rockstar Music
- Songwriters: Zoë Straub; Christof Straub

Zoë singles chronology
"Mon cœur a trop aimé" (2015)	"Loin d'ici" (2016)	"La nuit des merveilles" (2016)

Eurovision Song Contest 2016 entry
- Country: Austria
- Artist: Zoë
- Language: French
- Composers: Zoë Straub, Christof Straub
- Lyricists: Zoë Straub, Christof Straub

Finals performance
- Semi-final result: 7
- Semi-final points: 170
- Final result: 13
- Final points: 151

Entry chronology
- ◄ "I Am Yours" (2015)
- "Running on Air" (2017) ►

"Loin d'ici" (French pronunciation: [lwɛ̃ disi]; English: "Far from Here") is a French language song performed by Austrian singer, songwriter, and actress Zoë. The song was released as a digital download on 5 February 2016 through Global Rockstar Music, and was written by Zoë and Christof Straub. The song represented Austria in the Eurovision Song Contest 2016.

== Eurovision Song Contest ==
On 11 January 2016, Zoë was announced as one of the nine competing artists in the Austrian national selection Wer singt für Österreich? 2016. During the show's final, she placed fourth with the jury, but managed to qualify to the superfinal as one of the top two acts, where she was later declared the winner by Austrian televoters. She represented Austria in the Eurovision Song Contest 2016 in Stockholm, reaching the 13th position in the Grand Final with 151 points.

== Track listing ==
Digital download
No.	Title	Length
1.	"Loin d'ici (Esc version)"	3:00

== Chart performance ==
=== Weekly charts ===
Chart (2016)	Peak position
Austria (Ö3 Austria Top 40)	13
Belgium (Ultratip Flanders)	40
France (SNEP)	99
Netherlands (Single Top 100)	117
Sweden (Sverigetopplistan)	66

== Release history ==
Region	Date	Format	Label
Worldwide	5 February 2016	Digital download	Global Rockstar Music
