= Austria in the Eurovision Song Contest 2016 =

- Eurovision Song Contest 2016
- Participating broadcaster: Österreichischer Rundfunk (ORF)
- Country: Austria
- Selection process: Wer singt für Österreich?
- Selection date: 12 February 2016

Competing entry
- Song: "Loin d'ici"
- Artist: Zoë
- Songwriters: Zoë Straub; Christof Straub

Placement
- Semi-final result: Qualified (7th, 170 points)
- Final result: 13th, 151 Points

Participation chronology

Austria was represented at the Eurovision Song Contest 2016 with the song "Loin d'ici" written by Zoë Straub and Christof Straub. The song was performed by Zoë. The Austrian broadcaster Österreichischer Rundfunk (ORF) organised the national final Wer singt für Österreich? in order to select the Austrian entry for the 2016 contest in Stockholm, Sweden. Ten songs competed in a televised show where a jury panel and a public vote first selected the top two entries to proceed to a second round of voting. In the second round, a public vote exclusively selected "Loin d'ici" performed by Zoë as the winner. This was the first time that the Austrian song was performed entirely in the French language at the Eurovision Song Contest. The Austrian song was also the only entry performed in the final entirely in a language other than English.

Austria was drawn to compete in the first semi-final of the Eurovision Song Contest which took place on 10 May 2016. Performing during the show in position 12, "Loin d'ici" was announced among the top 10 entries of the first semi-final and therefore qualified to compete in the final on 14 May. It was later revealed that Austria placed seventh out of the 18 participating countries in the semi-final with 170 points. In the final, Austria performed in position 24 and placed thirteenth out of the 26 participating countries, scoring 151 points.

== Background ==
Prior to the 2016 contest, Austria has participated in the Eurovision Song Contest forty-eight times since its first entry in 1957. The nation has won the contest on two occasions: in 1966 with the song "Merci, Chérie" performed by Udo Jürgens and in 2014 with the song "Rise Like a Phoenix" performed by Conchita Wurst. Following the introduction of semi-finals for the 2004 contest, Austria has featured in only four finals. Austria's least successful result has been last place, which they have achieved on eight occasions, most recently in 2012. Austria has also received nul points on four occasions; in 1962, 1988, 1991 and 2015.

The Austrian national broadcaster, Österreichischer Rundfunk (ORF), broadcasts the event within Austria and organises the selection process for the nation's entry. ORF confirmed their intentions to participate at the 2016 Eurovision Song Contest on 14 September 2015. From 2011 to 2013, ORF set up national finals with several artists to choose both the song and performer to compete at Eurovision for Austria, with both the public and a panel of jury members involved in the selection. For the 2014 Eurovision Song Contest, ORF held an internal selection to choose the artist and song to represent Austria at the contest. In 2015, the broadcaster returned to selecting the Austrian entry through a national final. Along with their participation confirmation, the broadcaster also announced that the Austrian entry for the 2016 contest would be selected through a national final.

== Before Eurovision ==
=== Wer singt für Österreich? ===
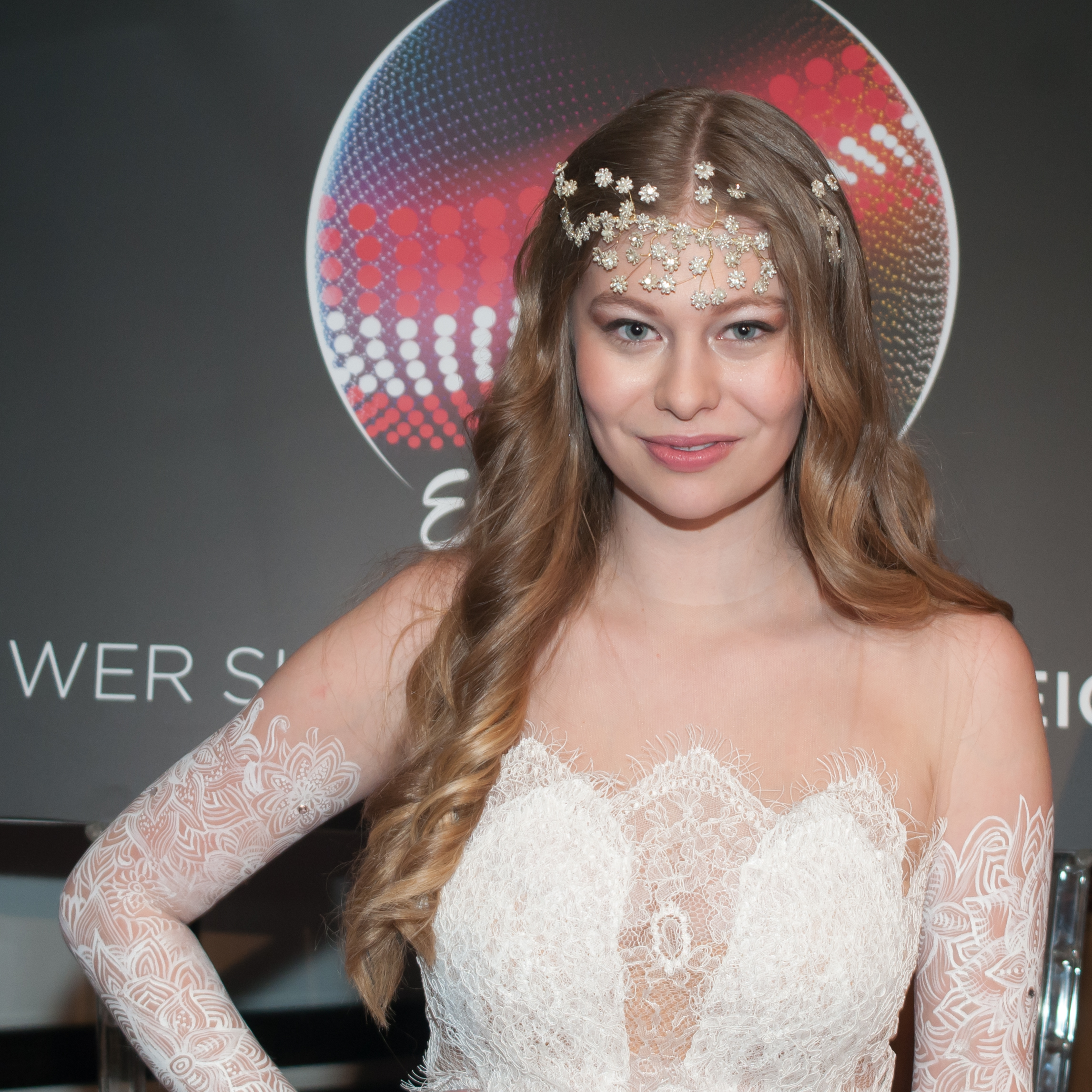
Zoë backstage during Wer singt für Österreich?

Wer singt für Österreich? (Who sings for Austria?) was the national final that selected Austria's entry for the Eurovision Song Contest 2016. The competition took place on 12 February 2016 at the ORF Center in Vienna, hosted by Andi Knoll and Alice Tumler and broadcast on ORF eins as well as streamed online via ORF's official website and the official Eurovision Song Contest website eurovision.tv. The first part of the national final was watched by 393,000 viewers in Austria with a market share of 15%, while the second part was watched by 515,000 viewers in Austria with a market share of 28%.

==== Format ====
Ten songs competed in the competition where the winner was selected over two rounds of voting. In the first round, public voting and an expert jury panel consisting of three individual members and a fourth aggregate press vote selected the top two entries to advance to the second round. Following the performances of each competing entry, each juror assigned a score up to 10 points. The sum of all the jury scores created an overall ranking from which points from 1 (lowest) to 10 (highest) were distributed. Viewers were able to vote via telephone or SMS and the overall ranking of the entries was also assigned scores from 1 to 10. After the combination of the jury and public votes, the top two entries proceeded to the second round where the winner was selected exclusively by public voting.

The members of the expert panel were:

- Conchita Wurst – singer, winner of the Eurovision Song Contest 2014
- Madita – singer and actress
- Julie Frost – singer-songwriter, wrote Germany's Eurovision Song Contest 2010 winning song "Satellite"

An aggregate press jury vote with Christian Ude as the representative during the show. The jury consisted of the following eight members:

- Stefan Weinberger (Kronen Zeitung)
- Astrid Hofer (Österreich)
- Anna Gasteiger (Kurier)
- Christiane Fasching (Tiroler Tageszeitung)
- Martin Fichter-Wöß (Austria Press Agency)
- Marco Schreuder (ESC-blogger, Der Standard)
- Roland Bonimair (TV-Media)
- Christian Ude (Kleine Zeitung)

==== Competing entries ====
Nine artists were nominated by the ORF Eurovision Song Contest Team led by ORF chief editor Stefan Zechner, which collaborated with music expert Eberhard Forcher in order to make the selections, while a tenth act was chosen through a Facebook-based online wildcard selection. For the wildcard selection, ORF invited all interested artists to submit their songs to the broadcaster between 17 November 2015 and 11 December 2015. The broadcaster received 37 submissions at the close of the deadline, which were reviewed by the ORF Eurovision Team and posted on their Facebook page. Based on editorial considerations and viewer response, ORF shortlisted five entries from these submissions for a 24-hour online voting period that commenced on 14 January 2016. The nine nominated artists were revealed on 11 January 2016, while "The One" performed by AzRaH was revealed on 15 January 2016 as the winner of the wildcard selection with 7,168 valid Facebook likes. "Closer to the Sun" performed by Sara Koell was initially revealed to have received the most Facebook likes, but AzRaH was ultimately declared the winner following an analysis of the votes due to irregularities involving a disproportionate rise in the number of likes some of the candidates received. The presentation of the songs took place on 21 January 2016 during the radio show Ö3-Wecker, aired on Ö3.

Wildcard Selection – 15 January 2016
Artist	Song	Songwriter(s)
AzRaH	"The One"	Azra Halilović
David Siedl feat. Madelene and MC Vio	"Wah Wah Whine"	David Siedl, MC Vio
Laura Kamhuber	"Stay Tonight"	Ylva Persson, Linda Persson
Ola Egbowon	"Addicted"	Ola Egbowon
Sara Koell	"Closer to the Sun"	Philipp van het Veld, Sara Koell

Artist	Song	Songwriter(s)
AzRaH	"The One"	Azra Halilović
Bella Wagner	"Weapons Down"	Bella Wagner, Masta Huda, Hovannes Djibian
Céline Roscheck and Farina Miss	"Sky Is the Limit"	Farina Miss, Peter Kreuzer
Elly V	"I'll Be Around (Bounce)"	Robert Pfluger, Eleonora Vardanian, Alexander Kahr
Lia	"Runaway"	Lukas Hillebrand
Lizza	"Psycho"	Anja Steinlechner Hubalek, Peter Wennerberg, Emil Vaker
Orry Jackson	"Pieces in a Puzzle"	Anna Molander, Hubert Molander
Sankil Jones	"One More Sound"	Sankil Jones, Philipp Van Het Veld, Christian Satter
Vincent Bueno	"All We Need Is That Love"	Vincent Bueno, Philipp Van Het Veld
Zoë	"Loin d'ici"	Zoë Straub, Christof Straub

==== Final ====
The televised final took place on 12 February 2016. Ten songs competed in the first round where the top two were selected by the combination of votes from a jury panel and a public vote to proceed to the second round. In the second round, public televoting selected "Loin d'ici" performed by Zoë as the winner. The song became Austria's first entry in the contest to be performed entirely in the French language. In addition to the performances of the competing entries, Conchita Wurst performed a new version of her 2012 Austrian national final song "That's What I Am".

First Round – 12 February 2016
R/O	Artist	Song	Jury		Place
R/O	Artist	Song	Votes	Points	Place
1	Vincent Bueno	"All We Need Is That Love"	25	6	—
2	Lizza	"Psycho"	32	8	—
3	Orry Jackson	"Pieces in a Puzzle"	19	5	—
4	Elly V	"I'll Be Around (Bounce)"	37	10	1
5	Lia	"Runaway"	18	4	—
6	Céline Roscheck and Farina Miss	"Sky Is the Limit"	10	2	—
7	AzRaH	"The One"	16	3	—
8	Sankil Jones	"One More Sound"	28	7	—
9	Bella Wagner	"Weapons Down"	36	9	3
10	Zoë	"Loin d'ici"	28	7	2

Second Round – 12 February 2016
R/O	Artist	Song	Place
1	Elly V	"I'll Be Around (Bounce)"	2
2	Zoë	"Loin d'ici"	1

=== Preparation ===
In March 2016, Zoë filmed the official music video for "Loin d'ici", which was directed by Ramon Rigoni. The video, which featured a 2D look with watercolour images, was released to the public on 15 March.

=== Promotion ===
Zoë made several appearances across Europe to specifically promote "Loin d'ici" as the Austrian Eurovision entry. On 9 April, Zoë performed during the Eurovision in Concert event which was held at the Melkweg venue in Amsterdam, Netherlands and hosted by Cornald Maas and Hera Björk. Between 11 and 13 April, Zoë took part in promotional activities in Tel Aviv, Israel and performed during the Israel Calling event held at the Ha'teatron venue. On 17 April, Zoë performed during the London Eurovision Party, which was held at the Café de Paris venue in London, United Kingdom and hosted by Nicki French and Paddy O'Connell.

In addition to her international appearances, Zoë performed "Loin d'ici" during the ATV broadcast of the Amadeus Austrian Music Awards, which took place at the Volkstheater in Vienna on 3 April and she performed as a musical guest during the ORF eins programme Dancing Stars on 15 April. Zoë also performed during the ORF 2 programme Guten Morgen Österreich on 15 April and performed during the Starnacht am Neusiedler See event in Podersdorf am See on 29 April which was broadcast on MDR in Germany on 30 April and on ORF 2 in Austria on 7 May. On 27 April, a farewell party was held for Zoë before she travelled to Stockholm for the contest, which was hosted by Riem Hagazi.

== At Eurovision ==
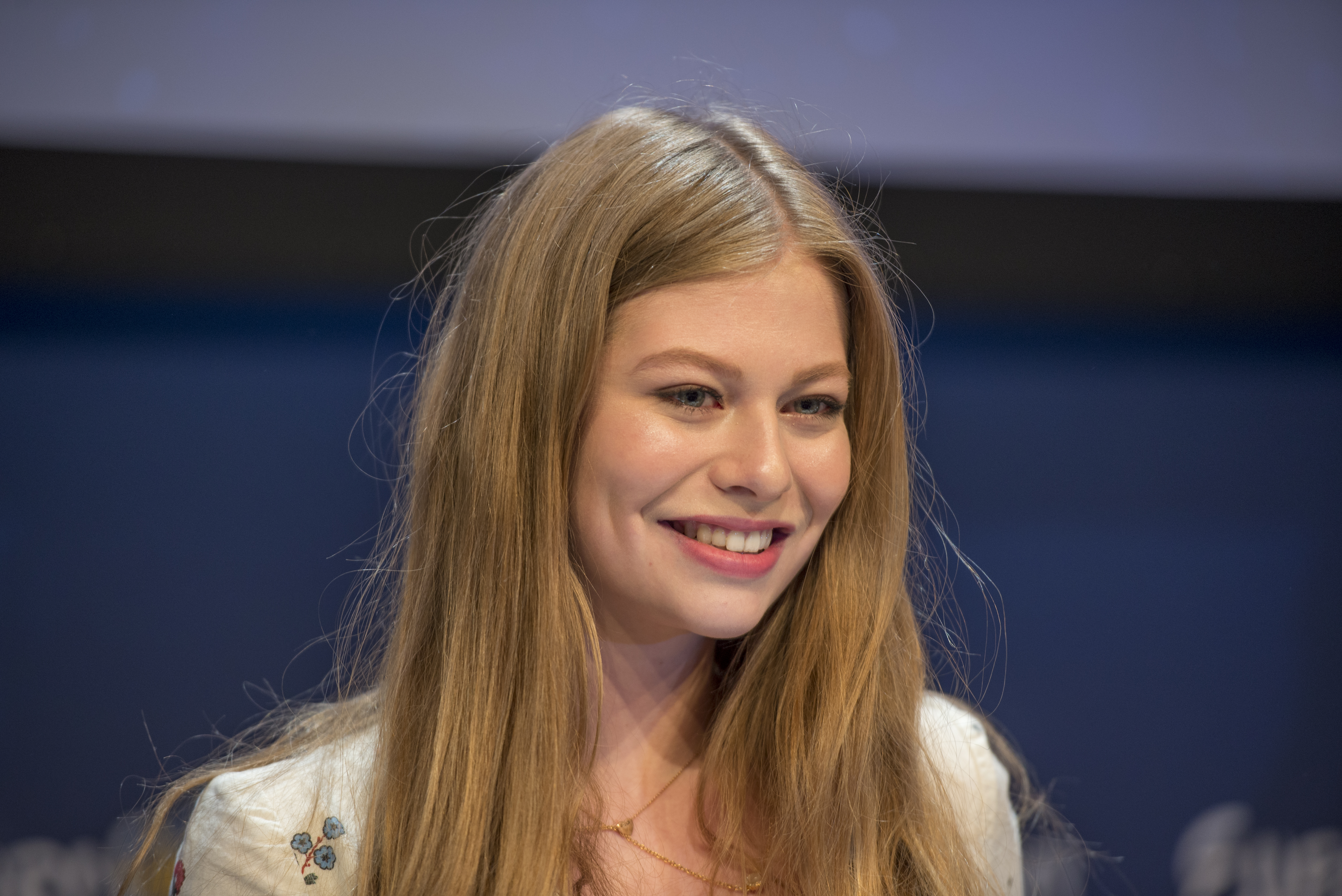
Zoë during a press meet and greet

According to Eurovision rules, all nations with the exceptions of the host country and the "Big Five" (France, Germany, Italy, Spain and the United Kingdom) are required to qualify from one of two semi-finals in order to compete for the final; the top ten countries from each semi-final progress to the final. The European Broadcasting Union (EBU) split up the competing countries into six different pots based on voting patterns from previous contests, with countries with favourable voting histories put into the same pot. On 25 January 2016, a special allocation draw was held which placed each country into one of the two semi-finals, as well as which half of the show they would perform in. Austria was placed into the first semi-final, to be held on 10 May 2016, and was scheduled to perform in the second half of the show.

Once all the competing songs for the 2016 contest had been released, the running order for the semi-finals was decided by the shows' producers rather than through another draw, so that similar songs were not placed next to each other. Austria was set to perform in position 12, following the entry from Cyprus and before the entry from Estonia.

The two semi-finals and the final were broadcast in Austria on ORF eins with commentary by Andi Knoll. ORF 2 also broadcast the final interpreted in International Sign for deaf and sign language users. The Austrian spokesperson, who announced the top 12-point score awarded by the Austrian jury during the final, was Kati Bellowitsch.

=== Semi-final ===
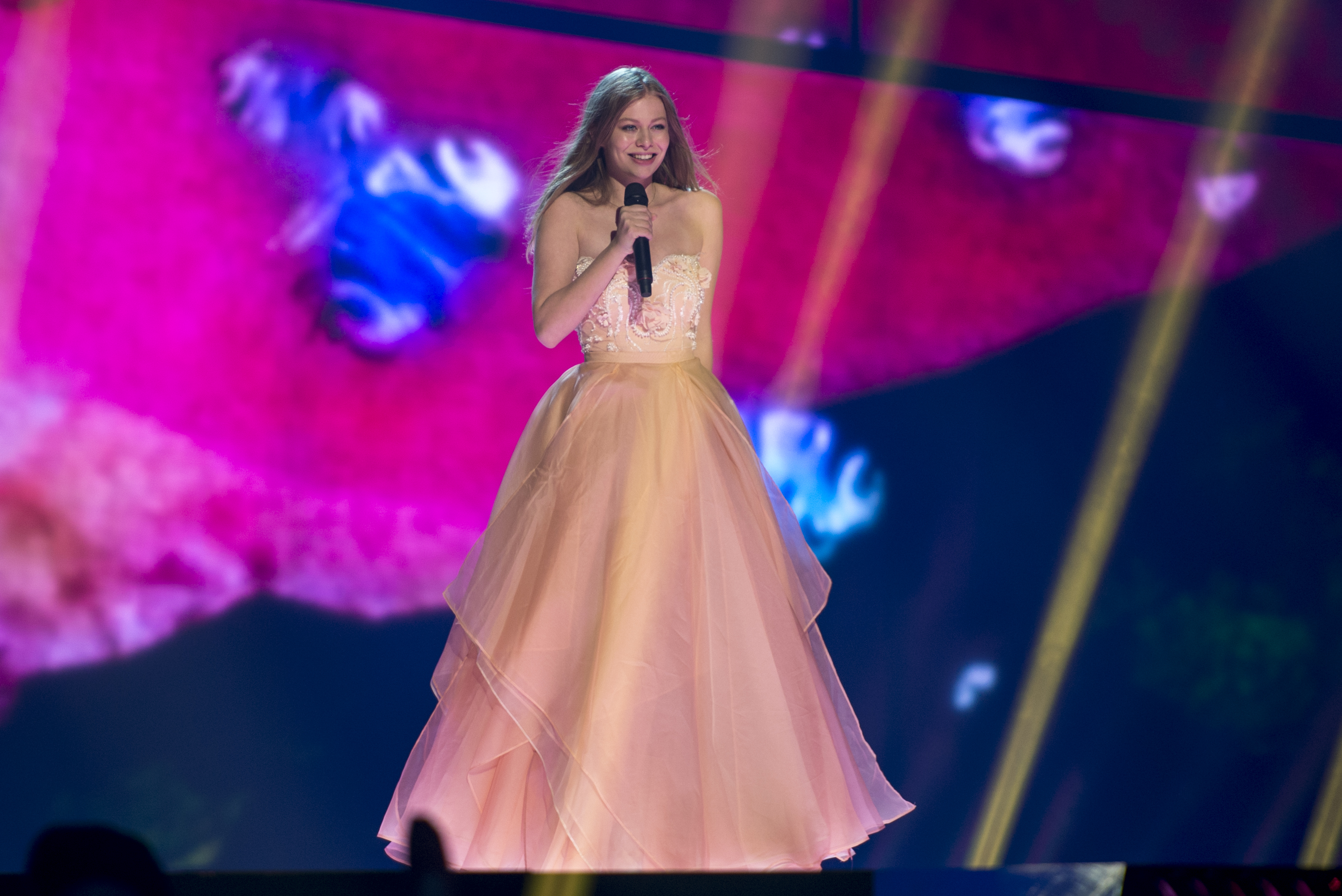
Zoë during a rehearsal before the first semi-final

Zoë took part in technical rehearsals on 3 and 6 May, followed by dress rehearsals on 9 and 10 May. This included the jury show on 9 May where the professional juries of each country watched and voted on the competing entries.

The Austrian performance featured Zoë performing on stage in a peach coloured gown with images of flowers, butterflies, meadows and rainbows appearing on the LED screens. During the performance, Zoë walked down a yellow-pink brick road that appeared on the LED stage floor accompanied by a wind machine effect. Zoë was joined by three off-stage backing vocalists: Christian Knollmüller, Sandra Þórðardóttir and Alexandra Moqvist.

At the end of the show, Austria was announced as having finished in the top 10 and subsequently qualifying for the grand final. It was later revealed that Austria placed seventh in the semi-final, receiving a total of 170 points: 133 points from the televoting and 37 points from the juries.

=== Final ===
Shortly after the first semi-final, a winners' press conference was held for the ten qualifying countries. As part of this press conference, the qualifying artists took part in a draw to determine which half of the grand final they would subsequently participate in. This draw was done in the order the countries appeared in the semi-final running order. Austria was drawn to compete in the second half. Following this draw, the shows' producers decided upon the running order of the final, as they had done for the semi-finals. Austria was subsequently placed to perform in position 24, following the entry from Georgia and before the entry from the United Kingdom.

Zoë once again took part in dress rehearsals on 13 and 14 May before the final, including the jury final where the professional juries cast their final votes before the live show. Zoë performed a repeat of her semi-final performance during the final on 14 May. Austria placed thirteenth in the final, scoring 151 points: 120 points from the televoting and 31 points from the juries.

=== Voting ===
Voting during the three shows was conducted under a new system that involved each country now awarding two sets of points from 1–8, 10 and 12: one from their professional jury and the other from televoting. Each nation's jury consisted of five music industry professionals who are citizens of the country they represent, with their names published before the contest to ensure transparency. This jury judged each entry based on: vocal capacity; the stage performance; the song's composition and originality; and the overall impression by the act. In addition, no member of a national jury was permitted to be related in any way to any of the competing acts in such a way that they cannot vote impartially and independently. The individual rankings of each jury member as well as the nation's televoting results were released shortly after the grand final.

Below is a breakdown of points awarded to Austria and awarded by Austria in the first semi-final and grand final of the contest, and the breakdown of the jury voting and televoting conducted during the two shows:

==== Points awarded to Austria ====
Points awarded to Austria (Semi-final 1)
Score	Televote	Jury
12 points	Spain	France
10 points	Estonia; Finland; France; Netherlands; Russia	
8 points	Hungary; Iceland	
7 points	Croatia; Moldova; Sweden	
6 points	Azerbaijan; Bosnia and Herzegovina	Netherlands
5 points	Armenia; Czech Republic; Greece	Czech Republic
4 points		Iceland
3 points	Cyprus; San Marino	Finland
2 points		Cyprus; Greece; Sweden
1 point	Malta	Malta

Points awarded to Austria (Final)
Score	Televote	Jury
12 points		
10 points	Switzerland	
8 points	France; Russia	France; Netherlands
7 points	Germany	
6 points	Croatia; Estonia; Finland; Hungary; Netherlands; Slovenia	
5 points	Bosnia and Herzegovina; Sweden	Belgium
4 points	Armenia; Bulgaria; Czech Republic; Latvia; Moldova; Poland	Finland; Switzerland
3 points	Australia; Belgium; Israel	
2 points	Iceland; Spain	
1 point	Denmark; Greece; Ireland; Lithuania	Iceland; San Marino

==== Points awarded by Austria ====
Points awarded by Austria (Semi-final 1)
Score	Televote	Jury
12 points	Bosnia and Herzegovina	Malta
10 points	Netherlands	Czech Republic
8 points	Hungary	Russia
7 points	Russia	Croatia
6 points	Croatia	Netherlands
5 points	San Marino	Armenia
4 points	Armenia	Azerbaijan
3 points	Iceland	Iceland
2 points	Cyprus	Finland
1 point	Czech Republic	Estonia

Points awarded by Austria (Final)
Score	Televote	Jury
12 points	Poland	Australia
10 points	Ukraine	Malta
8 points	Russia	Sweden
7 points	Sweden	France
6 points	Netherlands	Croatia
5 points	Bulgaria	Belgium
4 points	Serbia	Czech Republic
3 points	Australia	Russia
2 points	Germany	Armenia
1 point	France	Lithuania

==== Detailed voting results ====
The following members comprised the Austrian jury:

- Daniel Harb (Sankil Jones; jury chairperson) – singer, songwriter, performer
- Dorothee Freiberger – music producer, sound engineer, composer
- Lukas Hillebrand (Hille) – musician, producer
- Peter Pansky – music management, booking & PR, musician
- Franz Pleterski – marketing director

Detailed voting results from Austria (Semi-final 1)
R/O	Country	Jury							Televote	
R/O	Country	S. Jones	D. Freiberger	Hille	P. Pansky	F. Pletenski	Rank	Points	Rank	Points
01	Finland	6	12	8	2	13	9	2	14	
02	Greece	15	17	17	16	17	17		11	
03	Moldova	14	13	14	14	14	14		15	
04	Hungary	8	8	9	15	12	11		3	8
05	Croatia	3	7	5	8	4	4	7	5	6
06	Netherlands	1	6	3	7	11	5	6	2	10
07	Armenia	2	4	7	6	9	6	5	7	4
08	San Marino	13	14	11	17	16	15		6	5
09	Russia	7	3	4	3	6	3	8	4	7
10	Czech Republic	9	1	2	4	5	2	10	10	1
11	Cyprus	16	11	13	12	10	13		9	2
12	Austria									
13	Estonia	4	10	12	10	8	10	1	16	
14	Azerbaijan	10	9	6	9	3	7	4	12	
15	Montenegro	17	16	16	11	15	16		17	
16	Iceland	12	5	10	5	7	8	3	8	3
17	Bosnia and Herzegovina	11	15	15	13	2	12		1	12
18	Malta	5	2	1	1	1	1	12	13	

Detailed voting results from Austria (Final)
R/O	Country	Jury							Televote	
R/O	Country	S. Jones	D. Freiberger	Hille	P. Pansky	F. Pletenski	Rank	Points	Rank	Points
01	Belgium	1	12	10	6	9	6	5	14	
02	Czech Republic	12	7	7	9	7	7	4	23	
03	Netherlands	9	11	11	7	16	11		5	6
04	Azerbaijan	23	17	9	8	5	12		24	
05	Hungary	14	16	17	25	19	19		11	
06	Italy	22	18	13	11	22	17		13	
07	Israel	10	14	12	12	15	13		17	
08	Bulgaria	6	10	14	17	20	14		6	5
09	Sweden	3	5	4	10	4	3	8	4	7
10	Germany	17	21	24	19	18	23		9	2
11	France	5	3	3	18	3	4	7	10	1
12	Poland	20	25	25	23	25	25		1	12
13	Australia	2	1	1	1	2	1	12	8	3
14	Cyprus	24	19	21	20	21	24		16	
15	Serbia	13	13	23	24	24	22		7	4
16	Lithuania	16	6	6	16	10	10	1	20	
17	Croatia	8	9	5	5	8	5	6	19	
18	Russia	21	8	8	4	6	8	3	3	8
19	Spain	19	20	20	3	11	15		15	
20	Latvia	18	24	19	22	13	21		18	
21	Ukraine	15	15	16	13	23	16		2	10
22	Malta	11	2	2	2	1	2	10	25	
23	Georgia	25	23	15	14	17	20		21	
24	Austria									
25	United Kingdom	7	22	22	21	14	18		22	
26	Armenia	4	4	18	15	12	9	2	12	
