= Absent Elk =

British pop rock band

- Origin: United Kingdom, Norway
- Genres: Pop rock
- Years active: 2008–present
- Label: Sony Music
- Members: Kjetil Mørland; Ric Wilson; James Penhallow; Ross Martin; Mike Hillman

Absent Elk are a British pop rock band who formed in 2008. They have released two singles to date, and released their first album in October 2009. Their cover version of Girls Aloud's "The Loving Kind", which was posted on YouTube, became a small phenomenon and led to them being invited to support Girls Aloud on the first leg of their Out of Control Tour in spring 2009. The band's name comes from their Norwegian influence, as the band's lead vocalist, Kjetil Mørland, is from Norway, whom he represented at the Eurovision Song Contest 2015 alongside Debrah Scarlett.

== History ==
In 2008, the band supported headlining acts The Script and The Hoosiers, and in 2009 they were invited to support Girls Aloud on the aforementioned tour. The band released "Sun & Water" in May 2009 and toured the UK the following month. Their debut album, Caught in the Headlights, was released in October 2008.

== Discography ==
=== Singles ===
Title	Release date	Label
"Sun & Water"	17 May 2009	Sony Music
"Change My World"	November 2009	
"Emily"	7 March 2010	
"Let Me Know (Radio Edit)"	12 September 2010	
"Comfort or Amuse"	15 May 2011	

=== Albums ===
Title	Release date	Label
Caught in the Headlights	18 October 2009	Sony Music

== Band members ==
- Kjetil Mørland – Vocals, Acoustic Guitar
- Ric Wilson – Drums, Backing Vocals
- James Penhallow – Bass
- Ross Martin – Guitar, Keyboard
- Mike Hillman – Guitar, Backing Vocals
