= Valentina Caniglia =

Italian-American cinematographer and director

- Born: Naples, Italy
- Occupations: Cinematographer and director
- Website: valentinacaniglia.com

Valentina Caniglia is an Italian cinematographer and director. Member of American Society of Cinematographers, ASC ; a member of the Collective Chiaroscuro Society of Cinematographers, CCS ; a member of The Academy of Motion Picture Arts and Sciences; a member of the European Federation of Cinematographers (IMAGO); a member of the Television Academy Arts and Sciences. Valentina is part of the International Cinematographers Guild Local 600 Director Of Photography. She won the American Society of Cinematographers, ASC Vision Award Mentee.

== Early life and education ==
Caniglia was born in Naples, Italy.

She moved to London, England to commence her career as a cinematographer and later relocated to New York City. She graduated from New York University with a degree in film production and began working in feature films, TV series, commercials, music videos, and documentaries. Caniglia has worked in the United States since 2001.

== Career ==
Caniglia is known for her work in lighting and cinematography in films, television series, commercials and music videos, including The Stand. For her work on the period film, Madeline's Oil, she won the Best Cinematography award at the Louisiana International Film Festival. She worked on the film Pomegranates and Myrrh, winner of the Golden Dagger at the Muscat Film Festival for Best Cinematography. The film premiered at the Sundance Film Festival and received the Best Film Award at Doha Tribeca Film Festival.

Caniglia worked on Soyka and has been the two-time winner of the Best Cinematography award at the New York Cinematography Awards and Canadian Cinematography Awards. She won the Best Cinematography award at the Los Angeles Film Festival for Fire In Water.

Other works by Valentina Caniglia include Without Grace, 3 Days Rising, Adieu, Lacan, and the video "Stand for a Change" starring Vanessa Williams and Billy Porter.

She was the cinematographer for the Apple TV+ series Dear X S2 and The Captain.

Caniglia directed The Amytal Therapy, which was nominated for Best Director at the Chelsea Film Festival and the London International Film Festival.

She has worked as a cinematographer for HBO, Netflix, Voyage TV, and Showtime and filmed commercials for British Airways, Ford Motor Company, Nike and GBX Shoes, the latter receiving the Telly Award. Caniglia has worked on music videos for Aesop Rock, Enzo Gragnaniello; The Roots; Articolo 31, The Stein and Jesse Lynn Madera.
