= Eurovision Song Contest 2015 =

International song competition

- Building Bridges

Dates and venue
- Semi-final 1: 19 May 2015
- Semi-final 2: 21 May 2015
- Final: 23 May 2015
- Venue: Wiener Stadthalle; Vienna, Austria

Organisation
- Organiser: European Broadcasting Union (EBU)
- Executive supervisor: Jon Ola Sand

Production
- Host broadcaster: Österreichischer Rundfunk (ORF)
- Director: Kurt Pongratz
- Executive producer: Edgar Böhm
- Presenters: Mirjam Weichselbraun; Alice Tumler; Arabella Kiesbauer; Conchita Wurst

Participants
- Number of entries: 40
- Number of finalists: 27
- Debuting countries: Australia
- Returning countries: Cyprus; Czech Republic; Serbia
- Non-returning countries: Ukraine
- Participation map: Finalist countries Countries eliminated in the semi-finals Countries that participated in the past but not in 2015

Vote
- Voting system: Each country/jury awards 12, 10, 8–1 points to their top 10 songs.
- Winning song: Sweden; "Heroes"

The Eurovision Song Contest 2015 was the 60th edition of the Eurovision Song Contest. It consisted of two semi-finals on 19 and 21 May and a final on 23 May 2015, held at Wiener Stadthalle in Vienna, Austria, and presented by Mirjam Weichselbraun, Alice Tumler, Arabella Kiesbauer, and Conchita Wurst. It was organised by the European Broadcasting Union (EBU) and host broadcaster Österreichischer Rundfunk (ORF), which staged the event after winning the 2014 contest for Austria with the song "Rise Like a Phoenix" by Conchita Wurst.

Broadcasters from forty countries participated in the contest, with Australia making a guest appearance. Cyprus and Serbia returned after a one-year absence, while the Czech Republic returned after its last participation in 2009. Meanwhile, Ukraine did not participate due to financial and political crises related to the Russo-Ukrainian War.

The winner was Sweden with the song "Heroes", performed by Måns Zelmerlöw and written by Anton Malmberg Hård af Segerstad, Joy Deb, and Linnea Deb. This was the country's second win in three years, having also won in 2012. Sweden won the jury vote and had the highest combined points, but placed third in the televote behind Italy and Russia. Overall the latter two countries placed third and second respectively, and Belgium and Australia rounded out the top five. Further down the table, Montenegro achieved its best result since its independence, finishing thirteenth. For the first time, the top four of the contest all scored over 200 points, with Russia's entry "A Million Voices" also becoming the first non-winning Eurovision song to score over 300 points. Austria and Germany became the first countries since 2003 to score no points in the final, with Austria also becoming the first host country to fail to score a point.

The EBU reported that over 197 million viewers watched the contest, beating the 2014 viewing figures by 2 million.

== Location ==
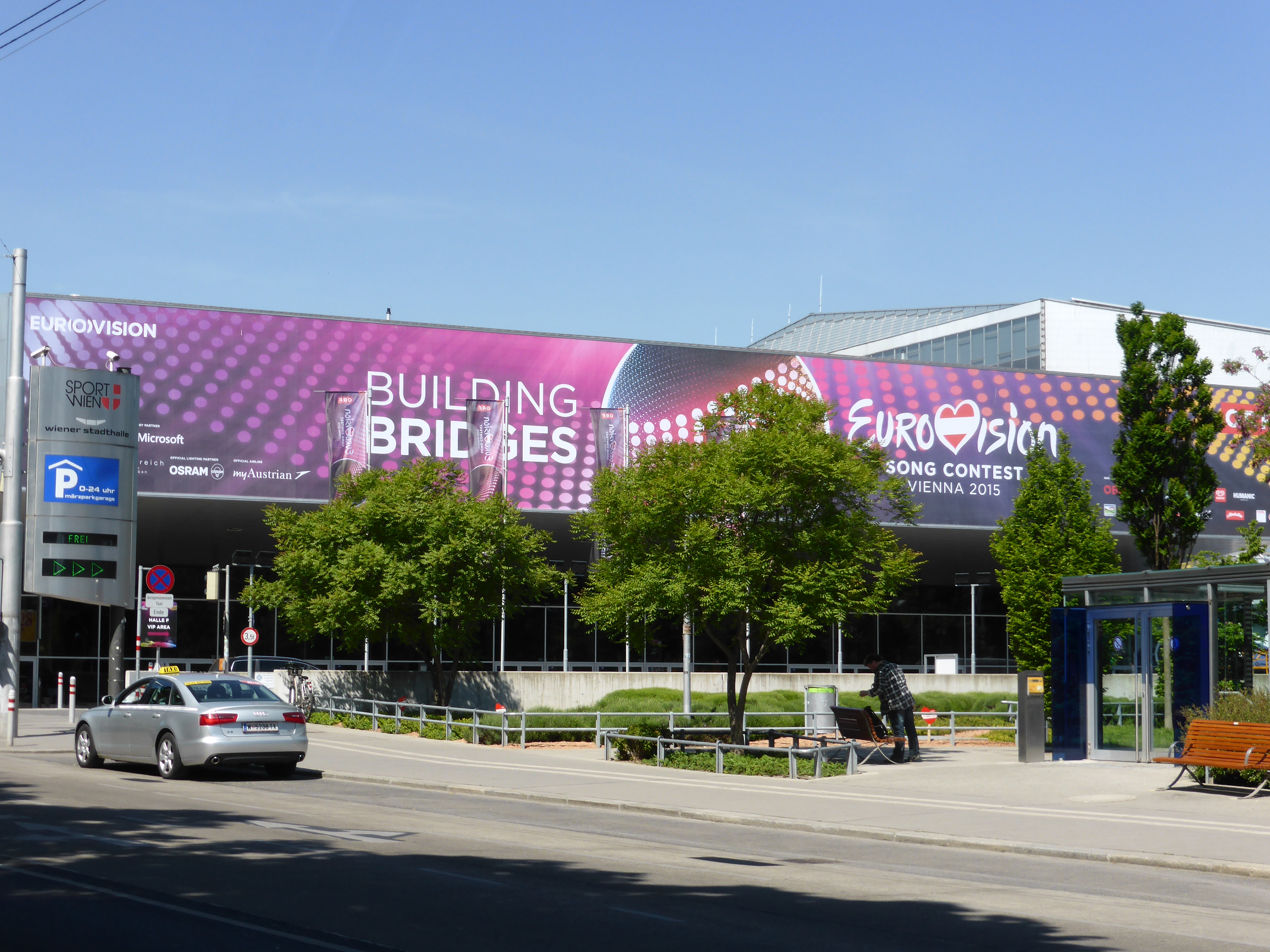
Wiener Stadthalle – host venue of the 2015 contest

The 2015 contest took place at Hall D of Wiener Stadthalle in Vienna, Austria, following the country's win in the 2014 edition with the song "Rise Like a Phoenix", performed by Conchita Wurst. Wiener Stadthalle hosts the annual Erste Bank Open tennis tournament, along with numerous concerts and events throughout the year. Hall D has a capacity of approximately 16,000 attendees.

=== Bidding phase ===
After Austria's victory in the 2014 contest, their delegation revealed the possibility of hosting the contest either in the capital city, Vienna, or in Salzburg. Vienna, Klagenfurt, Innsbruck, Lower Austria, Graz, Upper Austria, Burgenland, and Vorarlberg were all reportedly interested in hosting the contest; Salzburg pulled out of the bidding phase as the city was not able to meet the cost of the venue and promotion.

Vienna, considered the front-runner, had two venues in the phase: Wiener Stadthalle and the trade fair centre, Messe Wien, with capacities of up to 16,000 and 30,000 attendees respectively. Also in the race were Stadthalle Graz and Schwarzl Freizeit Zentrum, both located in the second largest city of Austria, Graz. With a maximum capacity of 30,000, the Wörthersee Stadium in Klagenfurt also joined the race; however, it would require the construction of a roof for the contest to be hosted there. Innsbruck also joined the race with Olympiahalle, which hosted ice hockey and figure skating at the 1964 and 1976 Winter Olympics. A fifth city, Linz, joined the race with Brucknerhaus, although the venue would not be big enough for the contest. Being geographically close to Linz, Wels showed desire to host the event as well. Oberwart, with the Exhibition hall, and Vorarlberg, with the Vorarlberger Landestheater, were the latest cities to declare an interest.

On 29 May 2014, Austrian host public broadcaster ORF and the EBU released some requirements and details about the venue. ORF requested interested parties to respond by 13 June 2014.

- The venue must be available for at least 6 to 7 weeks before the contest and one week after the conclusion of the contest.
- The venue must not be open-air, but an air-conditioned building with a capacity of at least 10,000 and a minimum ceiling height of 15 metres (49 ft), insulated for sound and light.
- The Green Room should be located in the arena or as near it as possible, with a capacity of 300.
- An additional room at least 6,000 square metres (65,000 ft^{2}) in area, to house 2 catering stands, a viewing room, make-up rooms, wardrobe, and booths for approximately 50 commentators.
- Separate offices to house the press centre, open between 11 and 24 May 2015, at least 4,000 square metres (43,000 ft^{2}) in area, with a capacity of at least 1,500 journalists.

After the deadline on 13 June 2014, ORF announced 12 venues interested in hosting the 2015 Eurovision Song Contest: ORF announced on 21 June 2014 that 3 cities (Vienna, Innsbruck, and Graz) had been short-listed in the final stage of the bidding process. On 6 August 2014, ORF announced the Wiener Stadthalle in Vienna as the host venue. The contest was provisionally set to take place on 12, 14 and 16 May 2015, but the dates were later pushed back a week in order to accommodate the candidate cities.

Locations of the candidate cities: the chosen host city is marked in blue. The shortlisted cities are marked in green, while the eliminated cities are marked in red.

Key † Host venue ‡ Shortlisted

City	Venue	Notes
Graz	Stadthalle Graz ‡	Hosted the 2010 European Men's Handball Championship.
Innsbruck	Olympiaworld ‡	Hosted the figure skating and ice hockey events at both the 1964 and 1976 Winter Olympic Games.
Klagenfurt	Wörthersee Stadion	Served as host for some matches of UEFA Euro 2008.
Oberwart	Messezentrum	
Vienna
Vienna	Schönbrunn Palace	
Vienna	Wiener Stadthalle (Hall D) †	Hosts the annual Erste Bank Open tennis tournament and many events throughout the year.
Vienna	Vienna International Airport, Parking C	
Vienna	Heldenplatz	
Vienna	New All-round Concert Hall in Neu Marx	
Vienna	Marx hall	
Vienna	Trabrennbahn Krieau	
Wels	Messe Wels	

=== Inclusive traffic lights ===
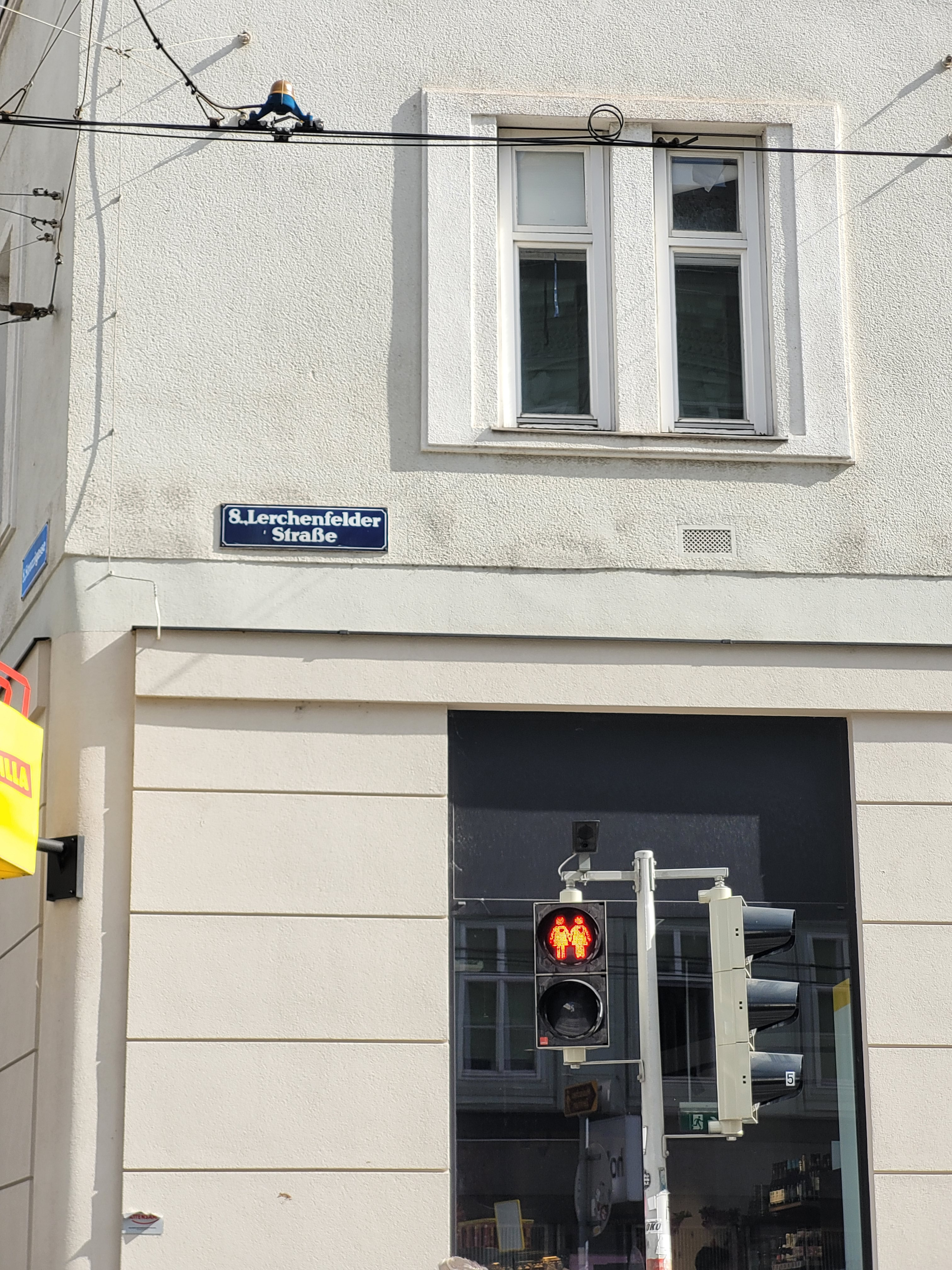
Traffic lights in Vienna picturing two female figures holding hands.

The city of Vienna introduced temporary new traffic signals for pedestrians on some streets, featuring same-sex couples holding hands or hugging. They were introduced as part of events connected to the theme of tolerance and inclusion in the lead-up to the Eurovision Song Contest.

Traffic lights of the same – copyrighted – design of the kind "Ampelpärchen" (couples for traffic lights) followed before Christopher Street Days in June 2015 in Salzburg and Linz. In Salzburg, the initiative SoHo and social democrate mayor Schaden promoted the change of the shape of the LED-lamps. The faceplates in Linz has been financed by sponsors driven by a Facebook-based initiative, but have been removed – without consent – by the new traffic minister of Linz of the party FPÖ in early December 2015.

== Participants ==
Eurovision Song Contest 2015 – Participation summaries by country
- Albania; Armenia; Australia; Austria; Azerbaijan; Belarus; Belgium; Cyprus; Czech Republic; Denmark; Estonia; Finland; France; Georgia; Germany; Greece; Hungary; Iceland; Ireland; Israel; Italy; Latvia; Lithuania; Macedonia; Malta; Moldova; Montenegro; Netherlands; Norway; Poland; Portugal; Romania; Russia; San Marino; Serbia; Slovenia; Spain; Sweden; Switzerland; United Kingdom

Eligibility for potential participation in the Eurovision Song Contest requires a national broadcaster with active EBU membership capable of receiving the contest via the Eurovision network and broadcasting it live nationwide. The EBU issued an invitation to participate in the contest to all active members.

On 23 December 2014, thirty-nine countries were initially announced to be participating in the 2015 contest. Cyprus and Serbia returned after one-year absences, the Czech Republic returned after a five-year absence, while Ukraine did not enter. Australia was later announced to be making its debut as a guest participant. The deadline to apply for participation was 15 September 2014. Countries that applied had until 10 October 2014 to withdraw from participation without financial consequences.

Inga Arshakyan, representing Armenia as part of Genealogy, represented Armenia in 2009, with her sister as part of Inga and Anush. Michele Perniola and Anita Simoncini both had represented San Marino at the Junior Eurovision Song Contest: Perniola in 2013, and Simoncini in 2014. Amber, representing Malta, was a backing vocalist for Malta in 2012. Uzari, representing Belarus, was a backing vocalist for Belarus in 2011. Elnur Hüseynov, had represented Azerbaijan in 2008 as part of the duo Elnur and Samir. Raay, representing Slovenia as part of the duo Maraaya, was a backing musical performer for Slovenia in 2014. Hera Björk, who had represented Iceland in 2010, returned as a backing singer for Iceland. Nicolas Dorian, who had represented Belgium in 2011 as part of Witloof Bay, returned as a backing singer for Belgium.

Eurovision Song Contest 2015 participants
Country	Broadcaster	Artist	Song	Language	Songwriter(s)
Albania	RTSH	Elhaida Dani	"I'm Alive"	English	Arbër Elshani; Kristijan Lekaj; Sokol Marsi
Armenia	AMPTV	Genealogy	"Face the Shadow"	English	Armen Martirosyan; Inna Mkrtchyan
Australia	SBS	Guy Sebastian	"Tonight Again"	English	David Ryan Harris; Louis Schoorl; Guy Sebastian
Austria	ORF	The Makemakes	"I Am Yours"	English	Jimmy Harry; The Makemakes
Azerbaijan	İTV	Elnur Hüseynov	"Hour of the Wolf"	English	Sandra Bjurman; Lina Hansson; Nicklas Lif; Nicolas Rebscher
Belarus	BTRC	Uzari and Maimuna	"Time"	English	Gerylana; Maimuna; Uzari
Belgium	RTBF	Loïc Nottet	"Rhythm Inside"	English	Loïc Nottet; Beverly Jo Scott
Cyprus	CyBC	John Karayiannis	"One Thing I Should Have Done"	English	Mike Connaris
Czech Republic	ČT	Marta Jandová and Václav Noid Bárta	"Hope Never Dies"	English	Václav Noid Bárta; Tereza Šoralová
Denmark	DR	Anti Social Media	"The Way You Are"	English	Chief 1; Remee
Estonia	ERR	Elina Born and Stig Rästa	"Goodbye to Yesterday"	English	Stig Rästa
Finland	Yle	Pertti Kurikan Nimipäivät	"Aina mun pitää"	Finnish	Pertti Kurikan Nimipäivät
France	France Télévisions	Lisa Angell	"N'oubliez pas"	French	M. Albert; Michel Illouz; Laure Izon
Georgia	GPB	Nina Sublatti	"Warrior"	English	Thomas G:son; Nina Sublatti
Germany	NDR (Note: On behalf of the German public broadcasting consortium ARD)	Ann Sophie	"Black Smoke"	English	Michael Harwood; Ella McMahon; Tonino Speciale
Greece	NERIT	Maria Elena Kyriakou	"One Last Breath"	English	Vangelis Konstantinidis; Maria Elena Kyriakou; Efthivoulos Theocharous; Evelina Tziora
Hungary	MTVA	Boggie	"Wars for Nothing"	English	Sára Hélène Bori; Boglárka Csemer; Áron Sebestyén
Iceland	RÚV	Maria Olafs	"Unbroken"	English	Ásgeir Orri Ásgeirsson; María Ólafsdóttir; Pálmi Ragnar Ásgeirsson; Sæþór Kristjánsson
Ireland	RTÉ	Molly Sterling	"Playing with Numbers"	English	Greg French; Molly Sterling
Israel	IBA	Nadav Guedj	"Golden Boy"	English	Doron Medalie
Italy	RAI	Il Volo	"Grande amore"	Italian	Francesco Boccia; Ciro Esposito
Latvia	LTV	Aminata	"Love Injected"	English	Aminata Savadogo
Lithuania	LRT	Monika Linkytė and Vaidas Baumila	"This Time"	English	Vytautas Bikus; Monika Liubinaitė
Macedonia	MRT	Daniel Kajmakoski	"Autumn Leaves"	English	Robert Bilbilov; Joacim Persson
Malta	PBS	Amber	"Warrior"	English	Matt "Muxu" Mercieca; Elton Zarb
Moldova	TRM	Eduard Romanyuta	"I Want Your Love"	English	Hayley Aitken; Tom Andrews; Erik Lewander
Montenegro	RTCG	Knez	"Adio" (Адио)	Montenegrin	Dejan Ivanović; Željko Joksimović; Marina Tucaković
Netherlands	AVROTROS	Trijntje Oosterhuis	"Walk Along"	English	Tobias Karlsson; Anouk Teeuwe
Norway	NRK	Mørland and Debrah Scarlett	"A Monster Like Me"	English	Kjetil Mørland
Poland	TVP	Monika Kuszyńska	"In the Name of Love"	English	Monika Kuszyńska; Kuba Raczyński
Portugal	RTP	Leonor Andrade	"Há um mar que nos separa"	Portuguese	Miguel Gameiro
Romania	TVR	Voltaj	"De la capăt"	Romanian, English	Victor Răzvan Alstani; Gabriel Constantin; Adrian Cristescu; Călin Gavril Goia; Andrei Mădalin Leonte; Silviu Marian Păduraru; Monica-Ana Stevens
Russia	C1R	Polina Gagarina	"A Million Voices"	English	Gabriel Alares; Joakim Björnberg; Leonid Gutkin; Vladimir Matetsky; Katrina Noorbergen
San Marino	SMRTV	Anita Simoncini and Michele Perniola	"Chain of Lights"	English	John O'Flynn; Ralph Siegel
Serbia	RTS	Bojana Stamenov	"Beauty Never Lies"	English	Vladimir Graić; Charlie Mason
Slovenia	RTVSLO	Maraaya	"Here for You"	English	Charlie Mason; Raay; Marjetka Vovk
Spain	RTVE	Edurne	"Amanecer"	Spanish	Peter Boström; Thomas G:son; Tony Sánchez-Ohlsson
Sweden	SVT	Måns Zelmerlöw	"Heroes"	English	Joy Deb; Linnea Deb; Anton Hård af Segerstad
Switzerland	SRG SSR	Mélanie René	"Time to Shine"	English	Mélanie René
United Kingdom	BBC	Electro Velvet	"Still in Love with You"	English	Adrian Bax White; David Mindel

=== Invitation of Australia ===
On 10 February 2015, the EBU announced that in honour of the 60th anniversary of the competition, it had invited its associate member Special Broadcasting Service (SBS) to participate in the final of the contest representing Australia. SBS had been a long-time broadcaster of the event, which has had a large following in Australia. The Australian entry was placed directly in the grand final. Although it was considered a one-off event, if it was to win, SBS would be allowed to co-host the 2016 contest with a full EBU member broadcaster of it choice in a city in the country of the latter, and would be able to participate again. The EBU considered the possibility of similarly inviting associate broadcasters from new countries to participate in future editions. Australia's participation brought the number of the finalists up to 27, the highest number of entries in a final in the contest's history.

=== Other countries ===
BHRT and BNT, the broadcasters for Bosnia and Herzegovina and Bulgaria, had both submitted a preliminary applications to participate in the 2015 contest, but ultimately withdrew them because of financial reasons. Ukrainian broadcaster NTU also opted out of the contest, also because of financial reasons and the ongoing armed conflict in the country.

Active EBU member broadcasters in Andorra, Croatia, Lebanon, Luxembourg (despite failed attempts by San Marino and Thierry Mersch to raise funds for a collaboration), Monaco, Morocco and Slovakia confirmed non-participation prior to the announcement of the participants list by the EBU. Despite tweets by event supervisor Sietse Bakker about the possibility of the Turkey's return in 2015, Turkish broadcaster TRT later confirmed that they had no plans in this regard.

== Format ==
The competition consisted of two semi-finals and a final, a format which has been in use since 2008. The ten countries with the highest scores in each semi-final qualified to the final where they joined the host nation Austria, the five main sponsoring nations (known as the "Big Five"): France, Germany, Italy, Spain and the United Kingdom, and Australia which was invited this year to commemorate the contest's 60th anniversary. Each participating country had their own national jury, which consisted of five professional members of the music industry. Each member of a respective nation's jury was required to rank every song, except that of their own country. The voting results from each member of a particular nation's jury were combined to produce an overall ranking from first to last place. Likewise, the televoting results were also interpreted as a full ranking, taking into account the full televoting result rather than just the top ten. The combination of the juries' full ranking and the televote's full ranking produced an overall ranking of all competing entries. The song which scored the highest overall rank received 12 points, while the tenth-best ranked song received one point. In the event of a televoting failure (insufficient number of votes or technical issues) or jury failure (technical issue or breach of rules), only one of the methods was used by each country.

The 2015 contest was the last time that the scoring system introduced in 1975 was used, before the format was modified the following year.

=== Organising team formation ===
During an initial meeting between the host broadcaster ORF and the EBU in late May 2014, the representatives of the core organising team were selected. Edgar Böhm, who is the Head of Entertainment at ORF, was announced as the executive producer.

=== Graphic design ===
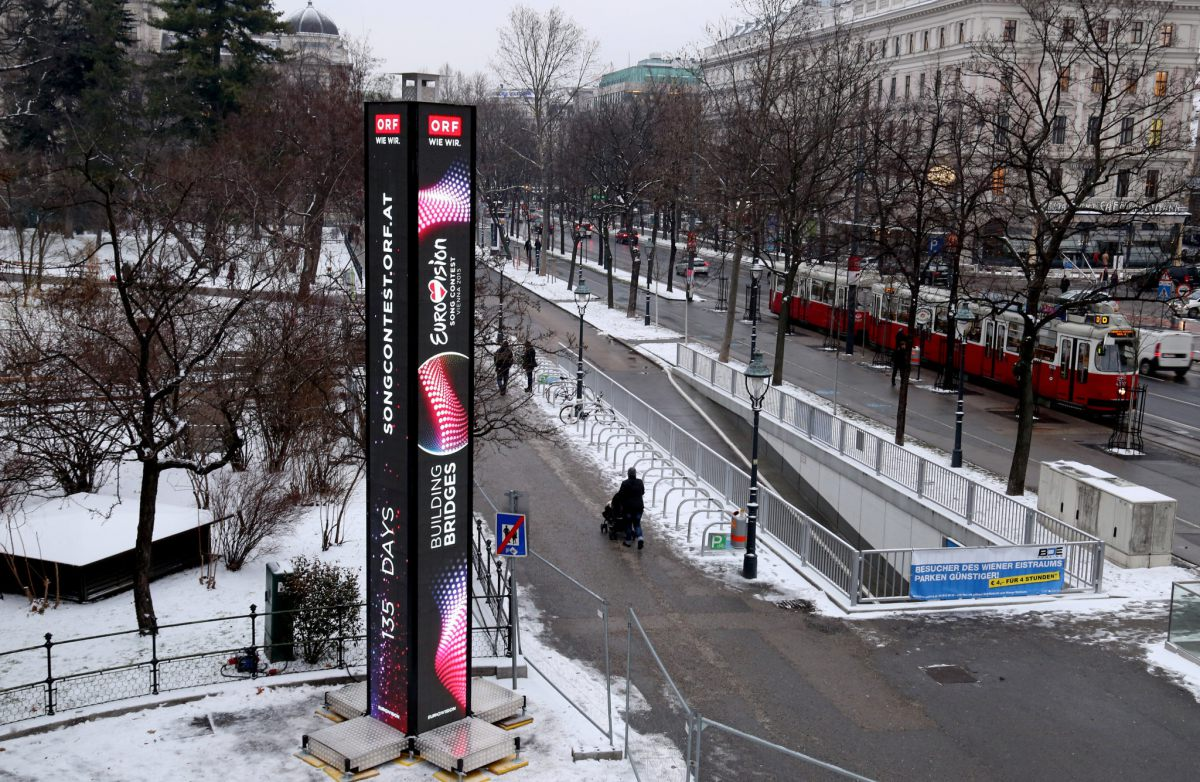
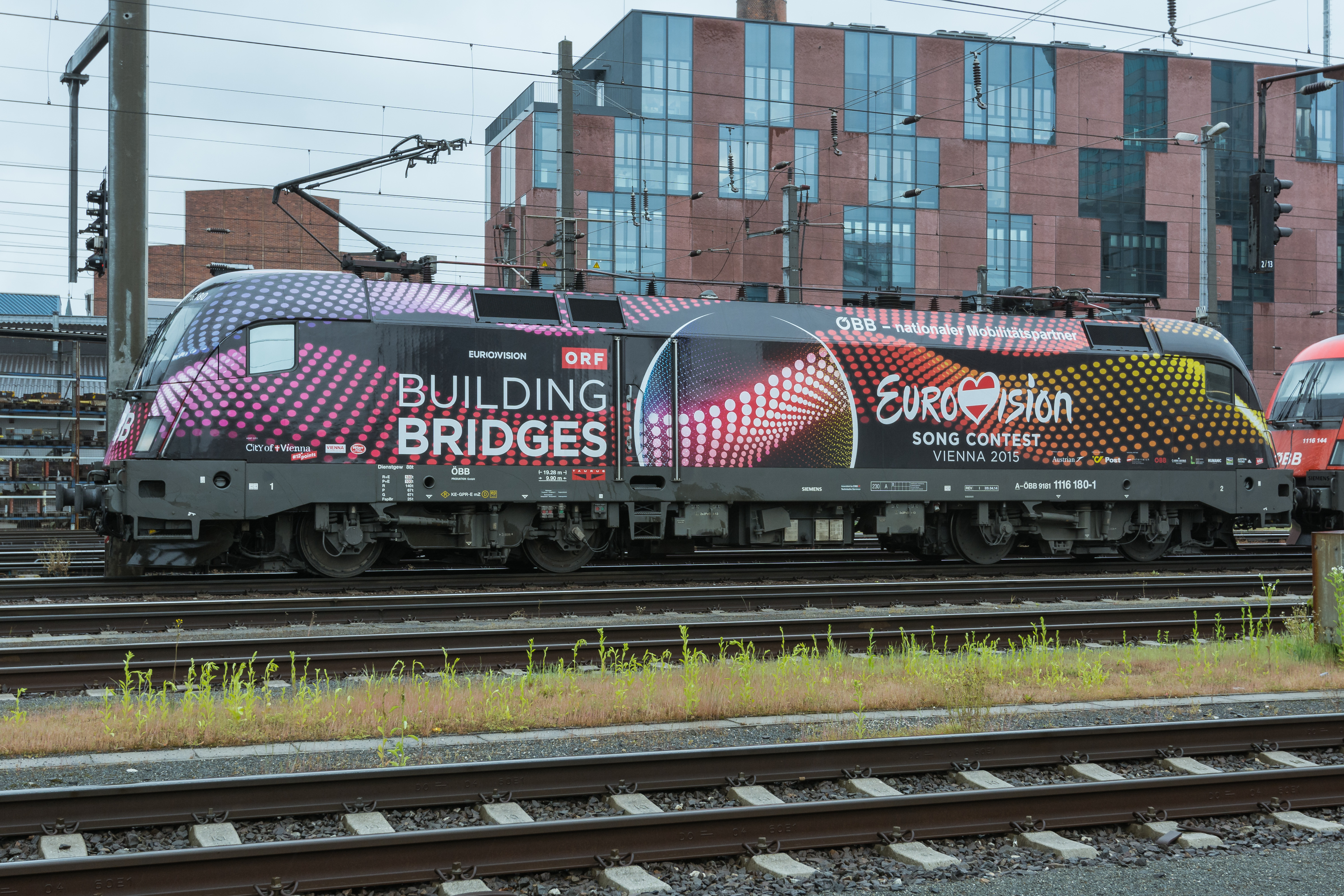
The graphic design of the 2015 contest, on display across Vienna

On 31 July 2014, the EBU released a new and revamped version of the generic logo as a celebration of the Eurovision Song Contest's 60th anniversary. On 11 September, the slogan for the 2015 contest was revealed to be "Building Bridges". The graphic design of the contest was revealed by the EBU on 25 November. The theme art depicts a wave made up of spheres which symbolise diversity, the bridging of connections and people's experiences.

The postcards of this year's contest was also based on the slogan "Building Bridges". Each postcard starts with a drive-by scene of the contestants' capital city, before showing every contestant receiving an invitation to Austria, where the contestants take part in a local activity. The postcards end with a picture of their activity plastered onto a billboard, placed in different locations across Vienna.

For this year's contest, all hashtags for the participating countries incorporated IOC country codes which were displayed onscreen alongside the main country names.

=== Presenters ===
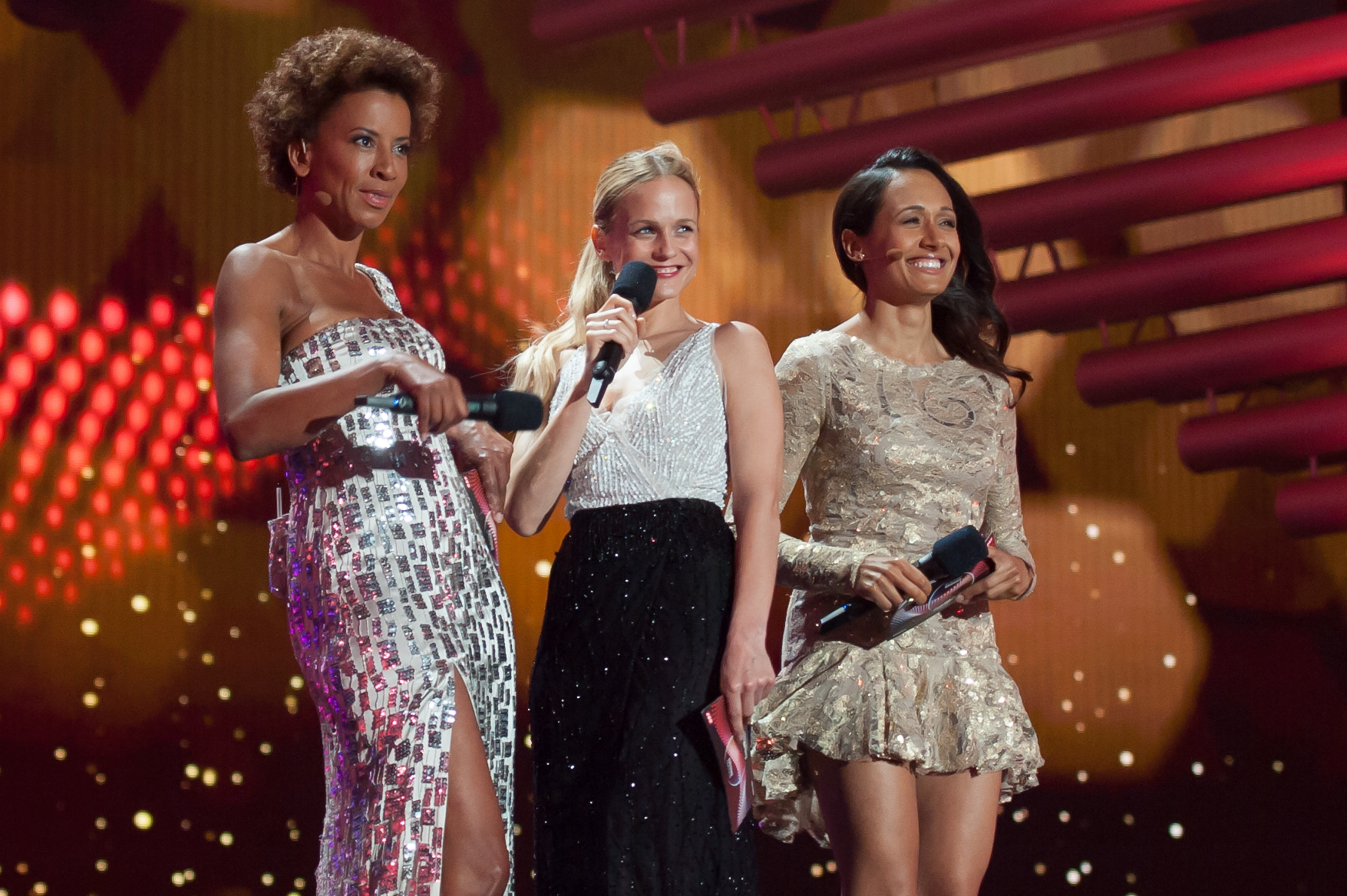
The presenters of the 2015 contest (from left): Arabella Kiesbauer, Mirjam Weichselbraun and Alice Tumler.

Mirjam Weichselbraun, Alice Tumler and Arabella Kiesbauer were the hosts of the 2015 contest; the all-female trio was the first in history to host the contest. The previous edition's winner Conchita Wurst was chosen as green room host.

=== Semi-final allocation draw ===
Results of the semi-final allocation draw Participating countries in the first semi-final Pre-qualified for the final but also voting in the first semi-final Participating countries in the second semi-final Pre-qualified for the final but also voting in the second semi-final Pre-qualified for the final but also voting in both semi-finals

The draw that determined the semi-final allocation was held on 26 January 2015 at the Vienna Rathaus and hosted by Andi Knoll and Kati Bellowitsch. The participating countries, excluding the automatic finalists (host country Austria, the "Big Five" and Australia), were split into five pots, based on voting patterns from the previous ten years. The pots were calculated by the televoting partner Digame and were as follows:

Pot 1	Pot 2	Pot 3	Pot 4	Pot 5
Albania; Macedonia; Malta; Montenegro; Serbia; Slovenia; Switzerland	Denmark; Estonia; Finland; Iceland; Latvia; Norway; Sweden	Armenia; Azerbaijan; Belarus; Georgia; Israel; Lithuania; Russia	Belgium; Cyprus; Greece; Ireland; Netherlands; San Marino	Czech Republic; Hungary; Moldova; Poland; Portugal; Romania

=== Opening and interval acts ===
The EBU ident's accompanying "Te Deum", which opened the broadcasts, was performed by the Vienna Philharmonic orchestra from the gardens of Schönbrunn Palace for the final. The overture featured violinist Lidia Baich, winner of Eurovision Young Musicians 1998, performing an excerpt of Austria's 1966 winning song "Merci, Chérie" in tribute to Udo Jürgens. Conchita Wurst, the Vienna Boys' Choir, multinational Suparar Children's Choir, rapper Left Boy, and the presenters then jointly performed the official anthem of the contest, "Building Bridges", accompanied by the ORF Radio Symphony Orchestra under the conduction of Peter Pejtsik. The twenty-seven finalists later took to the stage during the flag parade via a walkway through the audience from the green room.

The interval act was provided by percussionist Martin Grubinger and his band, the Percussive Planet Ensemble. The nine-minute performance, based on classical themes of major Austrian composers, included forty instrumentalists as well as the Grammy Award-winning Arnold Schoenberg Choir. Wurst later performed "You Are Unstoppable" and "Firestorm", both from her self-titled debut album.

== Contest overview ==
=== Semi-final 1 ===
The first semi-final took place on 19 May 2015 at 21:00 CEST. 16 countries took part in the first semi-final. All the countries competing in this semi-final were eligible to vote, plus Australia, Austria, France and Spain. The highlighted countries qualified for the final.

Qualifiers

Results of the first semi-final of the Eurovision Song Contest 2015
R/O	Country	Artist	Song	Points	Place
1	Moldova	Eduard Romanyuta	"I Want Your Love"	41	11
2	Armenia	Genealogy	"Face the Shadow"	77	7
3	Belgium	Loïc Nottet	"Rhythm Inside"	149	2
4	Netherlands	Trijntje Oosterhuis	"Walk Along"	33	14
5	Finland	Pertti Kurikan Nimipäivät	"Aina mun pitää"	13	16
6	Greece	Maria Elena Kyriakou	"One Last Breath"	81	6
7	Estonia	Elina Born and Stig Rästa	"Goodbye to Yesterday"	105	3
8	Macedonia	Daniel Kajmakoski	"Autumn Leaves"	28	15
9	Serbia	Bojana Stamenov	"Beauty Never Lies"	63	9
10	Hungary	Boggie	"Wars for Nothing"	67	8
11	Belarus	Uzari and Maimuna	"Time"	39	12
12	Russia	Polina Gagarina	"A Million Voices"	182	1
13	Denmark	Anti Social Media	"The Way You Are"	33	13
14	Albania	Elhaida Dani	"I'm Alive"	62	10
15	Romania	Voltaj	"De la capăt"	89	5
16	Georgia	Nina Sublatti	"Warrior"	98	4

=== Semi-final 2 ===
The second semi-final took place on 21 May 2015 at 21:00 CEST. 17 countries took part in this semi-final. All the countries competing in this semi-final were eligible to vote, plus Australia, Germany, Italy and the United Kingdom. The highlighted countries qualified for the final.

Qualifiers

Results of the second semi-final of the Eurovision Song Contest 2015
R/O	Country	Artist	Song	Points	Place
1	Lithuania	Monika Linkytė and Vaidas Baumila	"This Time"	67	7
2	Ireland	Molly Sterling	"Playing with Numbers"	35	12
3	San Marino	Anita Simoncini and Michele Perniola	"Chain of Lights"	11	16
4	Montenegro	Knez	"Adio"	57	9
5	Malta	Amber	"Warrior"	43	11
6	Norway	Mørland and Debrah Scarlett	"A Monster Like Me"	123	4
7	Portugal	Leonor Andrade	"Há um mar que nos separa"	19	14
8	Czech Republic	Marta Jandová and Václav Noid Bárta	"Hope Never Dies"	33	13
9	Israel	Nadav Guedj	"Golden Boy"	151	3
10	Latvia	Aminata	"Love Injected"	155	2
11	Azerbaijan	Elnur Hüseynov	"Hour of the Wolf"	53	10
12	Iceland	Maria Olafs	"Unbroken"	14	15
13	Sweden	Måns Zelmerlöw	"Heroes"	217	1
14	Switzerland	Mélanie René	"Time to Shine"	4	17
15	Cyprus	John Karayiannis	"One Thing I Should Have Done"	87	6
16	Slovenia	Maraaya	"Here for You"	92	5
17	Poland	Monika Kuszyńska	"In the Name of Love"	57	8

=== Final ===
The final took place on 23 May 2015 at 21:00 CEST and was won by Sweden. The "Big Five", the host country, Austria, as well as special guest participant Australia, qualified directly for the final. From the two semi-finals on 19 and 21 May 2015, twenty countries qualified for the final. A total of 27 countries participated in the final, the highest number in any final of Eurovision ever, and all 40 participants voted.

As in the previous two contests, the winner was announced as soon as it was mathematically impossible to catch up. In this case, the winner had been determined by the 36th vote out of the 40, which came from Cyprus.

Sweden won with 365 points, also winning the jury vote. Russia came second with 303 points, with Italy (who won the televote), Belgium, Australia, Latvia, Estonia, Norway, Israel and Serbia completing the top ten. Poland, United Kingdom, France, Austria and Germany occupied the bottom five positions, of which the last two countries received no points.

Winner

Results of the final of the Eurovision Song Contest 2015
R/O	Country	Artist	Song	Points	Place
1	Slovenia	Maraaya	"Here for You"	39	14
2	France	Lisa Angell	"N'oubliez pas"	4	25
3	Israel	Nadav Guedj	"Golden Boy"	97	9
4	Estonia	Elina Born and Stig Rästa	"Goodbye to Yesterday"	106	7
5	United Kingdom	Electro Velvet	"Still in Love with You"	5	24
6	Armenia	Genealogy	"Face the Shadow"	34	16
7	Lithuania	Monika Linkytė and Vaidas Baumila	"This Time"	30	18
8	Serbia	Bojana Stamenov	"Beauty Never Lies"	53	10
9	Norway	Mørland and Debrah Scarlett	"A Monster Like Me"	102	8
10	Sweden	Måns Zelmerlöw	"Heroes"	365	1
11	Cyprus	John Karayiannis	"One Thing I Should Have Done"	11	22
12	Australia	Guy Sebastian	"Tonight Again"	196	5
13	Belgium	Loïc Nottet	"Rhythm Inside"	217	4
14	Austria	The Makemakes	"I Am Yours"	0	26
15	Greece	Maria Elena Kyriakou	"One Last Breath"	23	19
16	Montenegro	Knez	"Adio"	44	13
17	Germany	Ann Sophie	"Black Smoke"	0	27
18	Poland	Monika Kuszyńska	"In the Name of Love"	10	23
19	Latvia	Aminata	"Love Injected"	186	6
20	Romania	Voltaj	"De la capăt"	35	15
21	Spain	Edurne	"Amanecer"	15	21
22	Hungary	Boggie	"Wars for Nothing"	19	20
23	Georgia	Nina Sublatti	"Warrior"	51	11
24	Azerbaijan	Elnur Hüseynov	"Hour of the Wolf"	49	12
25	Russia	Polina Gagarina	"A Million Voices"	303	2
26	Albania	Elhaida Dani	"I'm Alive"	34	17
27	Italy	Il Volo	"Grande amore"	292	3

==== Spokespersons ====
Each participating broadcaster appointed a spokesperson who was responsible for announcing, in English or French, the votes for its respective country. The voting order was revealed the morning of the final, and for the only time in Eurovision history to date, the names of all the spokespersons were displayed onscreen. However, because of technical problems in some countries the final voting order was the following:

1. Montenegro – Andrea Demirović
2. Malta – Julie Zahra
3. Finland – Krista Siegfrids
4. Greece – Helena Paparizou
5. Romania – Sonia Argint-Ionescu
6. Belarus – Teo
7. Albania – Andri Xhahu
8. Moldova – Olivia Furtună
9. Azerbaijan – Tural Asadov
10. Latvia – Markus Riva
11. Serbia – Maja Nikolić
12. Denmark – Basim
13. Switzerland – Laetitia Guarino
14. Belgium – Walid
15. France – Virginie Guilhaume
16. Armenia – Lilit Muradyan
17. Ireland – Nicky Byrne
18. Sweden – Mariette Hansson
19. Germany – Barbara Schöneberger
20. Australia – Lee Lin Chin
21. Czech Republic – Daniela Písařovicová
22. Spain – Lara Siscar
23. Austria – Kati Bellowitsch
24. Macedonia – Marko Mark
25. Slovenia – Tinkara Kovač
26. Hungary – Csilla Tatár
27. United Kingdom – Nigella Lawson
28. Lithuania – Ugnė Galadauskaitė
29. Netherlands – Edsilia Rombley
30. Poland – Ola Ciupa
31. Israel – Ofer Nachshon
32. Russia – Dmitry Shepelev
33. San Marino – Valentina Monetta
34. Italy – Federico Russo
35. Iceland – Sigríður Halldórsdóttir
36. Cyprus – Loukas Hamatsos
37. Norway – Margrethe Røed
38. Portugal – Suzy (Note: Portugal, Estonia and Georgia were originally scheduled to announce their votes as the 5th, 13th and 30th countries, respectively, but instead voted 38th, 39th and 40th, respectively, after all the other countries announced their votes. The reason for this was technical difficulties in the minutes running up to the voting presentation.)
39. Estonia – Tanja
40. Georgia – Natia Bunturi

== Detailed voting results ==
=== Semi-final 1 ===
Qualifiers

Split results of semi-final 1
Place	Combined		Jury		Televoting	
Place	Country	Points	Country	Points	Country	Points
1	Russia	182	Russia	167	Russia	151
2	Belgium	149	Belgium	151	Estonia	136
3	Estonia	105	Greece	99	Belgium	124
4	Georgia	98	Georgia	95	Georgia	97
5	Romania	89	Netherlands	70	Romania	96
6	Greece	81	Hungary	70	Armenia	90
7	Armenia	77	Romania	67	Serbia	86
8	Hungary	67	Belarus	66	Albania	66
9	Serbia	63	Estonia	66	Greece	61
10	Albania	62	Albania	61	Finland	55
11	Moldova	41	Denmark	58	Hungary	50
12	Belarus	39	Armenia	54	Moldova	48
13	Denmark	33 (Note: Despite finishing with the same number of points as the Netherlands, Denmark is deemed to have finished in thirteenth place due to receiving points from a greater number of countries.)	Serbia	47	Belarus	32
14	Netherlands	33	Moldova	46	Denmark	23 (Note: Despite having the same number of televoting points as the Netherlands, Denmark is deemed to have finished higher due to receiving points from a greater number of countries in the televote.)
15	Macedonia	28	Macedonia	42	Netherlands	23
16	Finland	13	Finland	1	Macedonia	22

Detailed voting results in semi-final 1
Voting procedure used: 50% jury and televote 100% jury vote		Total score	Moldova	Armenia	Belgium	Netherlands	Finland	Greece	Estonia	Macedonia	Serbia	Hungary	Belarus	Russia	Denmark	Albania	Romania	Georgia	Australia	Austria	France	Spain
Contestants	Moldova	41		6						5	5		5			2	8	10				
Contestants	Armenia	77	4		**12**	5		7		7			7	**12**		5	1	8			5	4
Contestants	Belgium	149	5	1		**12**	**12**	6	10	6	7	10	6	8	**12**	6	7	5	8	6	**12**	10
Contestants	Netherlands	33			6		3		5	1					7	1	3	2			2	3
Contestants	Finland	13							4		4	2	1		2							
Contestants	Greece	81	3	8	3	6	2		1	4	6	3	3	5		**12**	6	4	6	4	3	2
Contestants	Estonia	105	2	4	5	8	8	4		2	2	8	8	10	8		2	3	5	10	4	**12**
Contestants	Macedonia	28	1						2		**12**					10			3			
Contestants	Serbia	63		5		7	4	2		**12**		4	4	4	1				**12**	7	1	
Contestants	Hungary	67			4	4	7		**12**		8			2	4	3	10		2	5	6	
Contestants	Belarus	39	8	7				3						6	3			**12**				
Contestants	Russia	182	7	10	8	10	10	**12**	8	8	10	**12**	**12**		10	7	**12**	7	10	**12**	10	7
Contestants	Denmark	33		2	1	3	1	1	7			7					5		4	1		1
Contestants	Albania	62	6		10			10		10		1		3				6		3	7	6
Contestants	Romania	89	**12**	3	7	2	6	5	3		3	5	2	1	6	8		1	1	8	8	8
Contestants	Georgia	98	10	**12**	2	1	5	8	6	3	1	6	10	7	5	4	4		7	2		5

==== 12 points ====
Below is a summary of the maximum 12 points each country awarded to another in the first semi-final. Countries which gave the maximum 12 points apiece from both the professional jury and televoting to the specified entrant are marked in bold.

N.	Contestant	Nation(s) giving 12 points
5	Russia	Austria, Belarus, Greece, Hungary, Romania
4	Belgium	Denmark, Finland, France, Netherlands
2	Armenia	Belgium, Russia
2	Serbia	Australia, Macedonia
1	Belarus	Georgia
1	Estonia	Spain
1	Georgia	Armenia
1	Greece	Albania
1	Hungary	Estonia
1	Macedonia	Serbia
1	Romania	Moldova

=== Semi-final 2 ===
Qualifiers

Split results of semi-final 2
Place	Combined		Jury		Televoting	
Place	Country	Points	Country	Points	Country	Points
1	Sweden	217	Sweden	208	Sweden	195
2	Latvia	155	Latvia	155	Israel	157
3	Israel	151	Norway	144	Latvia	116
4	Norway	123	Israel	114	Poland	114
5	Slovenia	92	Malta	84	Norway	104
6	Cyprus	87	Slovenia	84	Lithuania	98
7	Lithuania	67	Ireland	84	Slovenia	95
8	Poland	57 (Note: Despite finishing with the same number of points as Montenegro, Poland is deemed to have finished in eighth place due to receiving points from a greater number of countries.)	Cyprus	76	Cyprus	80
9	Montenegro	57	Azerbaijan	67	Montenegro	58
10	Azerbaijan	53	Lithuania	52	Czech Republic	51
11	Malta	43	Montenegro	47	Azerbaijan	37
12	Ireland	35	Czech Republic	34	Malta	32
13	Czech Republic	33	Portugal	23	Portugal	24
14	Portugal	19	Switzerland	15	Iceland	21
15	Iceland	14	Iceland	15	San Marino	16
16	San Marino	11	Poland	10	Ireland	14
17	Switzerland	4	San Marino	6	Switzerland	6

Detailed voting results of semi-final 2
Voting procedure used: 50% jury and televote 100% jury vote		Total score	Lithuania	Ireland	San Marino	Montenegro	Malta	Norway	Portugal	Czech Republic	Israel	Latvia	Azerbaijan	Iceland	Sweden	Switzerland	Cyprus	Slovenia	Poland	Australia	Germany	Italy	United Kingdom
Contestants	Lithuania	67		7	3		4	10		1	4	10	7	4		3	7			4			3
Contestants	Ireland	35	2		5	2				5		4	2		3		1	1			2		8
Contestants	San Marino	11				5																6	
Contestants	Montenegro	57						3	5	6	7	2	10		7	1	2	10				4	
Contestants	Malta	43		3	7	10				4	10									3		1	5
Contestants	Norway	123	8	4	8	6	5		8	7	1	7		10	**12**	10	6	6	6	8	7	2	2
Contestants	Portugal	19				4							3			6		4			1		1
Contestants	Czech Republic	33		1	4	1	1		1		8	1			1			3	8		4		
Contestants	Israel	151	4	8	6	3	10	8	10	2		3	8	8	10	7	10	5	10	7	8	**12**	**12**
Contestants	Latvia	155	**12**	**12**	10		7	7	7	8	2		6	7	8	8	8	8	7	10	10	8	10
Contestants	Azerbaijan	53	6			7	8		3	10	3			2	4		5		3	2			
Contestants	Iceland	14	1	2				2					5		2				2				
Contestants	Sweden	217	10	10	**12**	8	**12**	**12**	**12**	**12**	**12**	**12**	4	**12**		**12**	**12**	**12**	**12**	**12**	**12**	10	7
Contestants	Switzerland	4						1					1	1					1				
Contestants	Cyprus	87	3	6	2		2	6	6		5	6		5	6	5		7	4	6	5	7	6
Contestants	Slovenia	92	7		1	**12**	3	4	4	3	6	8	**12**	6		4	3		5	5	6	3	
Contestants	Poland	57	5	5			6	5	2			5		3	5	2	4	2		1	3	5	4

==== 12 points ====
Below is a summary of the maximum 12 points each country awarded to another in the second semi-final. Countries which gave the maximum 12 points apiece from both the professional jury and televoting to the specified entrant are marked in bold.

N.	Contestant	Nation(s) giving 12 points
14	Sweden	Australia, Cyprus, Czech Republic, Germany, Iceland, Israel, Latvia, Malta, Norway, Poland, Portugal, San Marino, Slovenia, Switzerland
2	Israel	Italy, United Kingdom
2	Latvia	Ireland, Lithuania
2	Slovenia	Azerbaijan, Montenegro
1	Norway	Sweden

=== Final ===
This is the first time since the juries were reintroduced alongside the televoting in 2009 that the winner was not placed first in the televoting.

Winner

Split results of the final
Place	Combined		Jury		Televoting	
Place	Country	Points	Country	Points	Country	Points
1	Sweden	365	Sweden	363	Italy	366
2	Russia	303	Latvia	249	Russia	286
3	Italy	292	Russia	247	Sweden	279
4	Belgium	217	Australia	224	Belgium	195
5	Australia	196	Belgium	187	Estonia	144
6	Latvia	186	Italy	184	Australia	132
7	Estonia	106	Norway	163	Israel	104
8	Norway	102	Israel	80	Latvia	100
9	Israel	97	Cyprus	63	Albania	93
10	Serbia	53	Georgia	62	Serbia	86
11	Georgia	51	Estonia	56	Armenia	77
12	Azerbaijan	49	Slovenia	48	Romania	69
13	Montenegro	44	Montenegro	48	Georgia	51
14	Slovenia	39	Azerbaijan	48	Azerbaijan	48
15	Romania	35	Austria	40	Poland	47
16	Armenia	34 (Note: Despite finishing with the same number of points as Albania, Armenia is deemed to have finished in sixteenth place due to receiving points from a greater number of countries.)	Serbia	34	Lithuania	44
17	Albania	34	Lithuania	31	Norway	43
18	Lithuania	30	Hungary	29	Montenegro	34
19	Greece	23	Greece	29	Slovenia	27
20	Hungary	19	Albania	26	Spain	26
21	Spain	15	France	24	Greece	24
22	Cyprus	11	Germany	24	Hungary	21
23	Poland	10	Romania	21	Cyprus	8
24	United Kingdom	5	Armenia	18	United Kingdom	7
25	France	4	United Kingdom	12	Germany	5
26	Austria	0 (Note: Despite both finishing with 0 points, tiebreaking rules put Austria in 26th place and Germany 27th due to their running order positions.)	Spain	8	France	4
27	Germany	0	Poland	2	Austria	0

Detailed voting results of the final
Voting procedure used: 50% jury and televote 100% televoting 100% jury vote		Total score	Montenegro	Malta	Finland	Greece	Romania	Belarus	Albania	Moldova	Azerbaijan	Latvia	Serbia	Denmark	Switzerland	Belgium	France	Armenia	Ireland	Sweden	Germany	Australia	Czech Republic	Spain	Austria	Macedonia	Slovenia	Hungary	United Kingdom	Lithuania	Netherlands	Poland	Israel	Russia	San Marino	Italy	Iceland	Cyprus	Norway	Portugal	Estonia	Georgia
Contestants	Slovenia	39	4		1						3	3	5							1						8				4		1	6				2		1			
Contestants	France	4																3																	1							
Contestants	Israel	97	3	5	3		1	2	5		7	1	6		3					4	5	2		1	2				5		5	4			2	8	5	6	4	7		1
Contestants	Estonia	106	1	3	10			7	4		4	6	2	6		2				3	2	3		3	6	2		7		8	4	2	3	7		2	1	2	3	1		2
Contestants	United Kingdom	5		1															1																3							
Contestants	Armenia	34				1		4								3	3						2			3								6								**12**
Contestants	Lithuania	30										7		1					7										4										6		2	3
Contestants	Serbia	53	**12**						2						5							5	3		3	10	6		1		1		2			3						
Contestants	Norway	102		2	4		6					2		3	10				4	7	4	4		2	4		4	4		5	3	3			6	5	10			6	4	
Contestants	Sweden	**365**	5	10	**12**	4	8	10	7	8	6	**12**	8	**12**	**12**	**12**	8	7	10		10	**12**	10	8	7	5	**12**	10	**12**	10	10	**12**	10	8	7	**12**	**12**	10	**12**	8	10	7
Contestants	Cyprus	11				10																					1															
Contestants	Australia	196		6	5	5	2	6	3	4		5	3	8	8	4	2	1	5	**12**	7			7	**12**		2	8	10	3	8	8	7	4	8	6	8	4	10		5	
Contestants	Belgium	217			7	7	7	8	1	6		4	4	7	2		**12**	4	2	10	8	6	6	6	5	1	3	**12**	3	7	**12**	5	4	10	5	7	4	7	7	5	7	6
Contestants	Austria	0																																								
Contestants	Greece	23							10									5																				8				
Contestants	Montenegro	44							6		2		**12**					8		2						4	10															
Contestants	Germany	0																																								
Contestants	Poland	10															4		3										2							1						
Contestants	Latvia	186		4	6	3	5	5		2	5		1	4	4	7	7	2	**12**	5	6	7	5	4	1		7	5	7	**12**	2	10		2	**12**	4	7	3	8	2	6	4
Contestants	Romania	35								**12**				2		5								5				1					5					1		4		
Contestants	Spain	15	2							1	1				1		5																1	1						3		
Contestants	Hungary	19					4										1				1		1												4						8	
Contestants	Georgia	51				2		3		5	10					1		10				1	4					3		6				5							1	
Contestants	Azerbaijan	49	8	8			3			3													**12**							2				3								10
Contestants	Russia	303	7	7	8	8	10	**12**	8	10	**12**	10	10	10	7	10	10	**12**	8	6	**12**	10	8	10	8	6	5	6	6		6	6	8			10	3	5	2	10	**12**	5
Contestants	Albania	34	10			6										6										**12**																
Contestants	Italy	292	6	**12**	2	**12**	**12**	1	**12**	7	8	8	7	5	6	8	6	6	6	8	3	8	7	**12**	10	7	8	2	8	1	7	7	**12**	**12**	10		6	**12**	5	**12**	3	8

==== 12 points ====
Below is a summary of the maximum 12 points each country awarded to another in the final. Countries which gave the maximum 12 points apiece from both the professional jury and televoting to the specified entrant are marked in bold.

N.	Contestant	Nation(s) giving 12 points
12	**Sweden**	Australia, Belgium, Denmark, Finland, Iceland, Italy, Latvia, Norway, Poland, Slovenia, Switzerland, United Kingdom
9	Italy	Albania, Cyprus, Greece, Israel, Malta, Portugal, Romania, Russia, Spain
5	Russia	Armenia, Azerbaijan, Belarus, Estonia, Germany
3	Belgium	France, Hungary, Netherlands
3	Latvia	Ireland, Lithuania, San Marino
2	Australia	Austria, Sweden
1	Albania	Macedonia
1	Armenia	Georgia
1	Azerbaijan	Czech Republic
1	Montenegro	Serbia
1	Romania	Moldova
1	Serbia	Montenegro

== Broadcasts ==
Most countries sent commentators to Vienna or commentated from their own country, in order to add insight to the participants and, if necessary, the provision of voting information.

It was reported by the EBU that the 2015 contest was viewed by a worldwide television audience of a record breaking 197 million viewers, beating the 2014 record which was viewed by 195 million.

Broadcasters and commentators in participating countries
Country	Broadcaster	Channel(s)	Show(s)	Commentator(s)	Ref(s)
Albania	RTSH	TVSH	All shows	Andri Xhahu	
Australia	SBS	SBS One	All shows	Julia Zemiro and Sam Pang	
Austria	ORF	ORF eins	All shows	Andi Knoll	
Azerbaijan	İTV	İTV, İTV Radio	All shows	Kamran Guliyev (presenter)	
Belarus	BTRC	Belarus-1, Belarus 24	All shows	Evgeny Perlin	
Belgium	RTBF	La Une	All shows	Jean-Louis Lahaye and Maureen Louys	
Belgium	RTBF	VivaCité	Final	Olivier Gilain	
Belgium	VRT	één, Radio 2	All shows	Peter Van de Veire and Eva Daeleman	
Cyprus	CyBC	RIK 1, RIK Sat, RIK HD, RIK Triton	All shows	Melina Karageorgiou	
Czech Republic	ČT	ČT art	Semi-finals	Aleš Háma	
Czech Republic	ČT	ČT1	Final	Aleš Háma	
Denmark	DR	DR1	All shows	Ole Tøpholm	
Denmark	DR	DR Ramasjang	All shows	Sign language performers	
Estonia	ERR	ETV	All shows	Marko Reikop	
Estonia	ERR	Raadio 2	SF1/Final	Mart Juur and Andrus Kivirähk	
Finland	Yle	Yle TV2	All shows	Finnish: Aino Töllinen and Cristal Snow; Swedish: Eva Frantz and Johan Lindroos	
Finland	Yle	Yle Radio Suomi	All shows	Aino Töllinen and Cristal Snow	
Finland	Yle	Yle Radio Vega	All shows	Eva Frantz and Johan Lindroos	
France	France Télévisions	France Ô	SF1	Mareva Galanter and Jérémy Parayre	
France	France Télévisions	France 2	Final	Stéphane Bern and Marianne James	
Georgia	GPB	1TV	All shows	Lado Tatishvili and Tamuna Museridze	
Germany	ARD	Einsfestival, Phoenix	Semi-finals	Peter Urban	
Germany	ARD	Das Erste	Final	Peter Urban	
Germany	ARD	EinsPlus	All shows	Sign language performers	
Greece	NERIT	NERIT1, NERIT HD, Deftero Programma	All shows	Maria Kozakou and Giorgos Kapoutzidis	
Hungary	MTVA	Duna	All shows	Gábor Gundel Takács	
Iceland	RÚV	RÚV, Rás 2	All shows	Felix Bergsson	
Israel	IBA	Channel 1	All shows	No commentary; Hebrew subtitles	
Israel	IBA	Channel 33	All shows	No commentary; Arabic subtitles	
Israel	IBA	IBA 88FM	All shows	Kobi Menora	
Israel	IBA	IBA 88FM	SF1	Yuval Caspin	
Israel	IBA	IBA 88FM	SF2	Tal Argaman	
Italy	RAI	Rai 4	Semi-finals (Note: The first semi-final was broadcast on Rai 4 with a 1 hour 40 minute delay; the second semi-final was broadcast live.)	Marco Ardemagni and Filippo Solibello	
Italy	RAI	Rai 2, Rai HD	Final	Federico Russo and Valentina Correani	
Italy	RAI	Rai Radio 2	All shows	Marco Ardemagni and Filippo Solibello	
Latvia	LTV	LTV1	All shows	Valters Frīdenbergs	
Latvia	LTV	LTV1	Final	Toms Grēviņš	
Macedonia	MRT	MRT 1, MRT Sat, Radio Skopje	All shows	Karolina Petkovska	
Macedonia	MRT	MRT 2, MRT 2 Sat	All shows	Unknown	
Moldova	TRM	Moldova 1	All shows	Daniela Babici	
Moldova	TRM	Radio Moldova, Radio Moldova Muzical, Radio Moldova Tineret	All shows	Daniela Babici	
Montenegro	RTCG	TVCG 2	All shows	Dražen Bauković and Tijana Mišković	
Montenegro	RTCG	TVCG Sat	Final	Dražen Bauković and Tijana Mišković	
Netherlands	AVROTROS	NPO 1, BVN, NPO Radio 2	All shows	Cornald Maas and Jan Smit	
Norway	NRK	NRK1	All shows	Olav Viksmo-Slettan	
Norway	NRK	NRK3	Final	Ronny Brede Aase, Silje Nordnes and Markus Neby	
Norway	NRK	NRK P1	Final	Per Sundnes	
Poland	TVP	TVP1, TVP Polonia, TVP Rozrywka, TVP HD	All shows (Note: The three shows were broadcast on TVP Rozrywka and TVP HD with a one day delay.)	Artur Orzech	
Portugal	RTP	RTP1, RTP Internacional, RTP África	All shows (Note: RTP provided a delayed broadcast of the first semi-final.)	Hélder Reis and Ramon Galarza	
Romania	TVR	TVR 1, TVRi, TVR HD	All shows	Bogdan Stănescu	
Russia	Channel One Russia		All shows	Yana Churikova and Yuriy Aksyuta	
San Marino	SMRTV	San Marino RTV, Radio San Marino	All shows	Lia Fiorio and Gigi Restivo	
Serbia	RTS	RTS1, RTS HD, RTS SAT	SF1/Final	Duška Vučinić	
Serbia	RTS	RTS2, RTS SAT	SF2	Silvana Grujić	
Serbia	RTS	Radio Beograd 1	Final	Katarina Epstein and Nataša Raketić	
Slovenia	RTVSLO	TV SLO 2	Semi-finals	Andrej Hofer	
Slovenia	RTVSLO	TV SLO 1	Final	Andrej Hofer	
Slovenia	RTVSLO	Radio Val 202, Radio Maribor	SF2/Final	Andrej Hofer	
Spain	RTVE	La 2	Semi-finals	José María Íñigo and Julia Varela	
Spain	RTVE	La 1, Clan	Final (Note: The final was broadcast in Spain live on La 1 and with a delayed broadcast on Clan.)	José María Íñigo and Julia Varela	
Sweden	SVT	SVT1	All shows	Sanna Nielsen and Edward af Sillén	
Sweden	SR	SR P4	All shows	Carolina Norén and Ronnie Ritterland	
Switzerland	SRG SSR	SRF zwei	Semi-finals	Sven Epiney	
Switzerland	SRG SSR	SRF 1	Final	Sven Epiney	
Switzerland	SRG SSR	SRF 1, Radio SRF 3	Final	Peter Schneider and Gabriel Vetter	
Switzerland	SRG SSR	srf.ch (online)	Final	Sign language performers	
Switzerland	SRG SSR	rts.ch (online)	SF1	Jean-Marc Richard and Nicolas Tanner	
Switzerland	SRG SSR	RTS Deux	SF2	Jean-Marc Richard and Nicolas Tanner	
Switzerland	SRG SSR	RTS Un	Final	Jean-Marc Richard and Nicolas Tanner	
Switzerland	SRG SSR	RSI La 2	SF2	Clarissa Tami and Paolo Meneguzzi	
Switzerland	SRG SSR	RSI La 1	Final	Clarissa Tami and Paolo Meneguzzi	
United Kingdom	BBC	BBC Three	Semi-finals	Scott Mills and Mel Giedroyc	
United Kingdom	BBC	BBC One	Final	Graham Norton	
United Kingdom	BBC	BBC Radio 2 Eurovision	Semi-finals (Note: The first semi-final was broadcast on BBC Radio 2 Eurovision with a two-day delay; the second semi-final was broadcast live.)	Ana Matronic	
United Kingdom	BBC	BBC Radio 2	Final	Ken Bruce	

Broadcasters and commentators in non-participating countries
Country	Broadcaster	Channel(s)	Show(s)	Commentator(s)	Ref(s)
Bulgaria	BNT	BNT 1, BNT HD	Final	Elena Rosberg and Georgi Kushvaliev	
Canada	OutTV		All shows	Adam Rollins and Tommy D.	
China	HBS	Hunan Television	All shows	Kubert Leung and Wu Zhoutong	
Kosovo	RTK	Unknown	Final	Unknown	
New Zealand	BBC	BBC UKTV	All shows	No commentator	
Slovakia	RTVS	Rádio FM	Final	Daniel Baláž, Pavol Hubinák and Juraj Malíček	
Ukraine	NTU	UA:Pershyi	All shows	Timur Miroshnychenko and Tetyana Terekhova	

== Incidents and controversies ==
=== Reaction to Russia's results ===
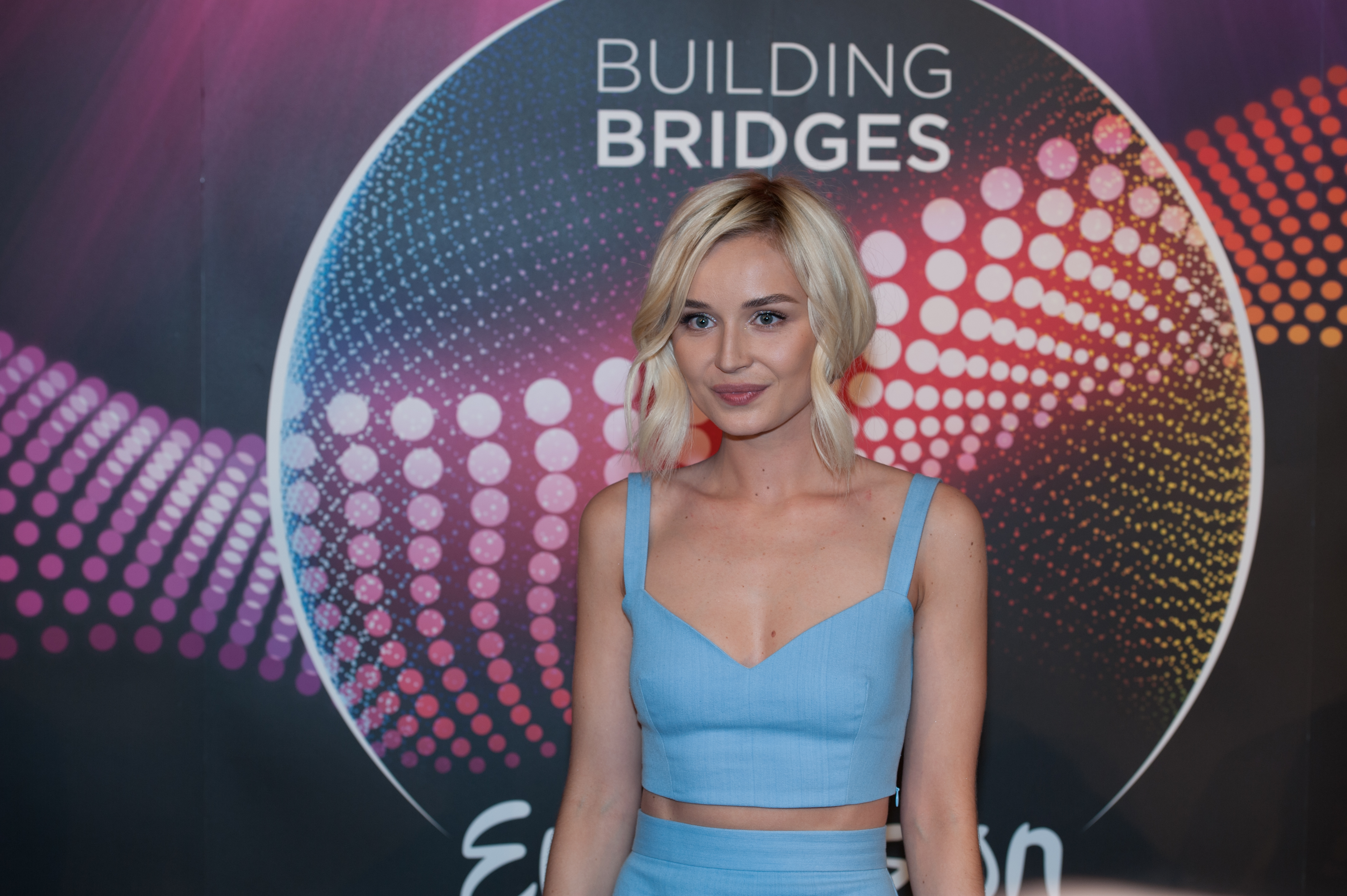
Polina Gagarina at the 2015 contest.

During the results segment of the final, loud boos could be heard whenever Russia was mentioned or the country received one of the top three set of points (12, 10 or 8 points). The Russian entrant Polina Gagarina could be seen crying in the green room during the voting procedure, and this was reported by various media to have occurred as a result of the booing. During a break in the countries' reporting of their votes, when the running total showed Russia leading, green room host Conchita Wurst said to Gagarina, "You gave an amazing performance, and you deserve to be in the lead." The contest's executive supervisor, Jon Ola Sand, urged that Eurovision should be a "friendly battlefield....not a political battleground", and presenter Alice Tumler reminded the audience that "Our motto is 'Building Bridges', and music should stand over politics tonight." The organisers had anticipated such reactions, and had prepared and installed 'anti-booing technology', which was deployed for the first time in the history of the contest.

=== Smoke machine malfunction ===
During the performance of Georgia in the final, a smoke machine malfunctioned, causing the Georgian entrant Nina Sublatti to temporarily disappear from view on the stage in a cloud of grey smoke.

=== Macedonia and Montenegro jury results excluded ===
The jury votes from Macedonia and Montenegro in the final were not included, in accordance with the rules of the contest. The rules indicate that votes must consist of 50% jurors and 50% televoting, but Macedonia's and Montenegro's votes was based entirely on televoting. The final result of the contest was not affected.

== Other awards ==
In addition to the main winner's trophy, the Marcel Bezençon Awards and the Barbara Dex Award were contested during the 2015 Eurovision Song Contest. The OGAE, "General Organisation of Eurovision Fans" voting poll also took place before the contest.

=== Marcel Bezençon Awards ===
The Marcel Bezençon Awards, organised since 2002 by Sweden's then-Head of Delegation and 1992 representative Christer Björkman, and 1984 winner Richard Herrey, honours songs in the contest's final. The awards are divided into three categories: Artistic Award, Composers Award, and Press Award. The winners were revealed shortly before the final on 23 May.

Category	Country	Song	Artist	Songwriter(s)
Artistic Award	Sweden	"Heroes"	Måns Zelmerlöw	Anton Malmberg Hård af Segerstad; Joy Deb; Linnea Deb
Composers Award	Norway	"A Monster Like Me"	Mørland and Debrah Scarlett	Kjetil Mørland
Press Award	Italy	"Grande amore"	Il Volo	Francesco Boccia; Ciro Esposito

=== OGAE ===
OGAE, an organisation of over forty Eurovision Song Contest fan clubs across Europe and beyond, conducts an annual voting poll first held in 2002 as the Marcel Bezençon Fan Award. The 2015 poll ran from 1 to 10 May, and after all votes were cast, the top-ranked entry was Italy's "Grande amore" performed by Il Volo; the top five results are shown below.

Country	Song	Artist	Points
Italy	"Grande amore"	Il Volo	367
Sweden	"Heroes"	Måns Zelmerlöw	338
Estonia	"Goodbye to Yesterday"	Elina Born and Stig Rästa	274
Norway	"A Monster Like Me"	Mørland and Debrah Scarlett	243
Slovenia	"Here for You"	Maraaya	228

=== Barbara Dex Award ===
The Barbara Dex Award is a humorous fan award given to the worst dressed artist each year. Named after Belgium's representative who came last in the 1993 contest, wearing her self-designed dress, the award was handed by the fansite House of Eurovision from 1997 to 2016 and is being carried out by the fansite songfestival.be since 2017.

Place	Country	Artist	Votes
1	Netherlands	Trijntje Oosterhuis	1,324
2	Serbia	Bojana Stamenov	605
3	United Kingdom	Electro Velvet	397
4	Albania	Elhaida Dani	263
5	Romania	Voltaj	237

== Official album ==
Cover art of the official album

Eurovision Song Contest: Vienna 2015 is the official compilation album of the 2015 contest, put together by the European Broadcasting Union and was released by Universal Music Group on 20 April 2015. The album features all 40 songs that entered in the 2015 contest, including the semi-finalists that failed to qualify into the grand final.

=== Charts ===
Weekly chart performance for Eurovision Song Contest: Vienna 2015
Chart (2015)	Peak position
Australian Albums (ARIA)	4
Austrian Compilation Albums (Ö3 Austria)	2
Belgian Compilation Albums (Ultratop 50 Flanders)	9
Belgian Compilation Albums (Ultratop 50 Wallonia)	7
Danish Compilation Albums (Tracklisten)	2
Dutch Compilation Albums (Compilation Top 30)	3
Finnish Albums (Suomen virallinen lista)	11
French Albums (SNEP)	192
German Compilation Albums (Offizielle Top 100)	2
UK Compilation Albums (Official Charts)	11

== See also ==
- ABU Radio Song Festival 2015
- ABU TV Song Festival 2015
- Bala Turkvision Song Contest 2015
- Eurovision Young Dancers 2015
- Junior Eurovision Song Contest 2015
- Turkvision Song Contest 2015
