= Norway in the Eurovision Song Contest 2015 =

- Eurovision Song Contest 2015
- Participating broadcaster: Norsk rikskringkasting (NRK)
- Country: Norway
- Selection process: Melodi Grand Prix 2015
- Selection date: 14 March 2015

Competing entry
- Song: "A Monster Like Me"
- Artist: Mørland and Debrah Scarlett
- Songwriters: Kjetil Mørland

Placement
- Semi-final result: Qualified (4th, 123 points)
- Final result: 8th, 102 points

Participation chronology

Norway was represented at the Eurovision Song Contest 2015 with the song "A Monster Like Me" written by Kjetil Mørland. The song was performed by Mørland and Debrah Scarlett. The Norwegian broadcaster Norsk rikskringkasting (NRK) organised the national final Melodi Grand Prix 2015 in order to select the Norwegian entry for the 2015 contest in Vienna, Austria. Eleven entries competed in a show that took place on 14 March 2015 and the winner was determined over two rounds of public televoting. The top four entries in the first round of voting advanced to the competition's second round—the Gold Final. In the second round of public televoting, "A Monster Like Me" performed by Mørland and Debrah Scarlett was selected as the winner with 88,869 votes.

Norway was drawn to compete in the second semi-final of the Eurovision Song Contest which took place on 21 May 2015. Performing during the show in position 6, "A Monster Like Me" was announced among the top 10 entries of the second semi-final and therefore qualified to compete in the final on 23 May. It was later revealed that Norway placed fourth out of the 17 participating countries in the semi-final with 123 points. In the final, Norway performed in position 9 and placed eighth out of the 27 participating countries, scoring 102 points.

== Background ==
Prior to the 2015 contest, Norway had participated in the Eurovision Song Contest 53 times since its first entry in 1960. Norway had won the contest on three occasions: in 1985 with the song "La det swinge" performed by Bobbysocks!, in 1995 with the song "Nocturne" performed by Secret Garden, and in 2009 with the song "Fairytale" performed by Alexander Rybak. Norway also has the two dubious distinctions of having finished last in the Eurovision final more than any other country and for having the most "nul points" (zero points) in the contest. The country has finished last eleven times and has failed to score a point during four contests. Following the introduction of semi-finals in 2004, Norway has finished in the top ten five times, including their 2014 entry "Silent Storm" performed by Carl Espen.

The Norwegian national broadcaster, Norsk rikskringkasting (NRK), broadcasts the event within Norway and organises the selection process for the nation's entry. NRK confirmed their intentions to participate at the 2015 Eurovision Song Contest on 21 May 2014. The broadcaster has traditionally organised the national final Melodi Grand Prix, which has selected the Norwegian entry for the Eurovision Song Contest in all but one of their participation. On 5 June 2014, the broadcaster revealed details regarding their selection procedure and announced the organization of Melodi Grand Prix 2015 in order to select the 2015 Norwegian entry.

== Before Eurovision ==
=== Melodi Grand Prix 2015 ===
Melodi Grand Prix 2015 was the 53rd edition of the Norwegian national final Melodi Grand Prix and selected Norway's entry for the Eurovision Song Contest 2015. The show took place on 14 March 2015 at the Oslo Spektrum in Oslo, hosted by Silya Nymoen and Kåre Magnus Bergh. For the first time since 1998, NRK reinstated a live orchestra as part of the show; the 54 members of the Norwegian Radio Orchestra accompanied each performance in varying capacities. The show was televised on NRK1 as well as streamed online at NRK's official website nrk.no and the official Eurovision Song Contest website eurovision.tv. The national final was watched by 1.25 million viewers in Norway with a market share of 69.8%, making it the most watched Melodi Grand Prix final since 2011.

==== Competing entries ====
A submission period was opened by NRK between 5 June 2014 and 1 September 2014. Songwriters of any nationality were allowed to submit entries, while performers of the selected songs would be chosen by NRK in consultation with the songwriters. In addition to the public call for submissions, NRK reserved the right to directly invite certain artists and composers to compete. At the close of the deadline, over 800 submissions were received. Eleven songs were selected for the competition by a jury panel consisting of Vivi Stenberg (Melodi Grand Prix music producer), Marie Komissar (radio host and music producer), Tarjei Strøm (musician and radio host) and Kathrine Synnes Finnskog (manager and director of Music Norway). The competing acts and songs were revealed on 21 January 2015 during a press conference at NRK studios, presented by Kåre Magnus Bergh and broadcast via NRK1 and online at mgp.no. Among the competing artists were former Eurovision Song Contest entrants Tor Endresen who represented the country in 1997, and Elisabeth Andreassen (Bettan) who represented Sweden in 1982 and Norway in 1985 (as part of Bobbysocks!), 1994 (alongside Jan Werner Danielsen) and 1996. 15-second clips of the competing entries were released during the press conference, while the songs in their entirety were premiered on 2 February.

==== Final ====
Eleven songs competed during the final on 14 March 2015. Six of the songs were performed together with the Norwegian Radio Orchestra and the winner was selected over two rounds of public televoting. In the first round, the top four entries were selected to proceed to the second round, the Gold Final. In the Gold Final, the results of the public televote were revealed by Norway's five regions and led to the victory of "A Monster Like Me" performed by Mørland and Debrah Scarlett with 88,869 votes. In addition to the performances of the competing entries, the interval act featured 2014 Norwegian Eurovision entrant Carl Espen performing his entry "Silent Storm" together with Josefin Winther.

Final – 14 March 2015
R/O	Artist	Song	Songwriter(s)	Result
1	Erlend Bratland	"Thunderstruck"	Joy Deb, Linnea Deb, Erlend Bratland	Advanced
2	Raylee	"Louder"	Andreas Stone Johansson, Ricky Hanley	—N/a
3	Tor and Bettan	"All Over the World"	Are Selheim, Tor Endresen	Advanced
4	Jenny Langlo	"Next to You"	Jenny Langlo, Robin Lynch, Niklas Olovson	—N/a
5	Ira Konstantinidis	"We Don't Worry"	Øyvind Blikstad, Bjarte Giske, Ali Pirzad, Julie Bergan	—N/a
6	Contrazt	"Heaven"	Jan Lysdahl, Jacob Launbjerg	—N/a
7	Marie Klåpbakken	"Ta meg tilbake"	Marie Klåpbakken, Linn Hege Sagen, Olav Tronsmoen	—N/a
8	Staysman and Lazz	"En godt stekt pizza"	Stian Thorbjørnsen, Petter Kristiansen, Lars Erik Blokkhus, Jesper Borgen, Magnus Clausen	Advanced
9	Mørland and Debrah Scarlett	"A Monster Like Me"	Kjetil Mørland	Advanced
10	Alexandra Joner	"Cinderella"	Erik Smaaland, Kristoffer Tømmerbakke, Thea Oskarsen	—N/a
11	Karin Park	"Human Beings"	Karin Park, Guy Chambers	—N/a

Gold Final – 14 March 2015
R/O	Artist	Song	Eastern Norway	Northern Norway	Central Norway	Southern Norway	Western Norway	Total	Place
1	Tor and Bettan	"All Over the World"	19,834	5,222	4,670	5,574	8,386	43,686	4
2	Staysman and Lazz	"En godt stekt pizza"	49,068	5,392	3,595	7,010	4,134	69,199	3
3	Mørland and Debrah Scarlett	"A Monster Like Me"	47,303	7,778	7,013	17,340	9,435	88,869	1
4	Erlend Bratland	"Thunderstruck"	37,334	8,504	7,161	10,816	21,558	85,373	2

=== Promotion ===
Mørland and Debrah Scarlett made several appearances across Europe to specifically promote "A Monster Like Me" as the Norwegian Eurovision entry. On 18 April, Mørland and Debrah Scarlett performed during the Eurovision in Concert event which was held at the Melkweg venue in Amsterdam, Netherlands and hosted by Cornald Maas and Edsilia Rombley. On 26 April, the duet performed during the London Eurovision Party, which was held at the Café de Paris venue in London, United Kingdom and hosted by Nicki French and Paddy O'Connell.

== At Eurovision ==
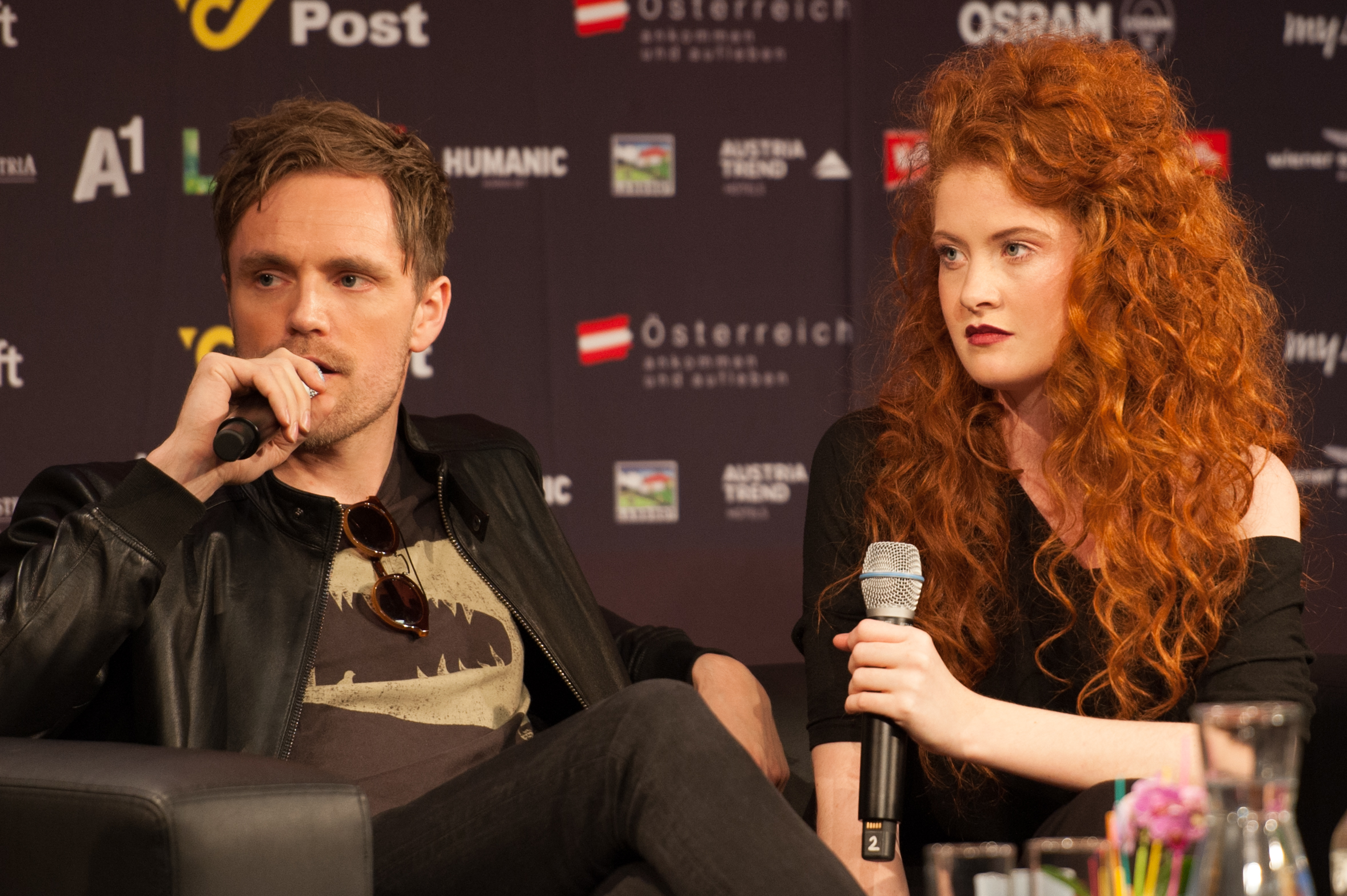
Mørland and Debrah Scarlett during a press meet and greet

According to Eurovision rules, all nations with the exceptions of the host country and the "Big Five" (France, Germany, Italy, Spain and the United Kingdom) are required to qualify from one of two semi-finals in order to compete for the final; the top ten countries from each semi-final progress to the final. In the 2015 contest, Australia also competed directly in the final as an invited guest nation. The European Broadcasting Union (EBU) split up the competing countries into five different pots based on voting patterns from previous contests, with countries with favourable voting histories put into the same pot. On 26 January 2015, an allocation draw was held which placed each country into one of the two semi-finals, as well as which half of the show they would perform in. Norway was placed into the second semi-final, to be held on 21 May 2015, and was scheduled to perform in the first half of the show.

Once all the competing songs for the 2015 contest had been released, the running order for the semi-finals was decided by the shows' producers rather than through another draw, so that similar songs were not placed next to each other. Norway was set to perform in position 6, following the entry from Malta and before the entry from Portugal.

In Norway, the two semi-finals and the final were broadcast on NRK1 with commentary by Olav Viksmo-Slettan. The Norwegian broadcaster also broadcast the three shows with sign language performers for the hearing impaired on NRK1 Tegnspråk. The final was also broadcast via radio on NRK P1 with commentary by Per Sundnes, while an alternative broadcast of the final was also televised on NRK3 with commentary by the hosts of the NRK P3 radio show P3morgen Ronny Brede Aase, Silje Reiten Nordnes and Markus Ekrem Neby. The Norwegian spokesperson, who announced the Norwegian votes during the final, was Margrethe Røed.

=== Semi-final ===
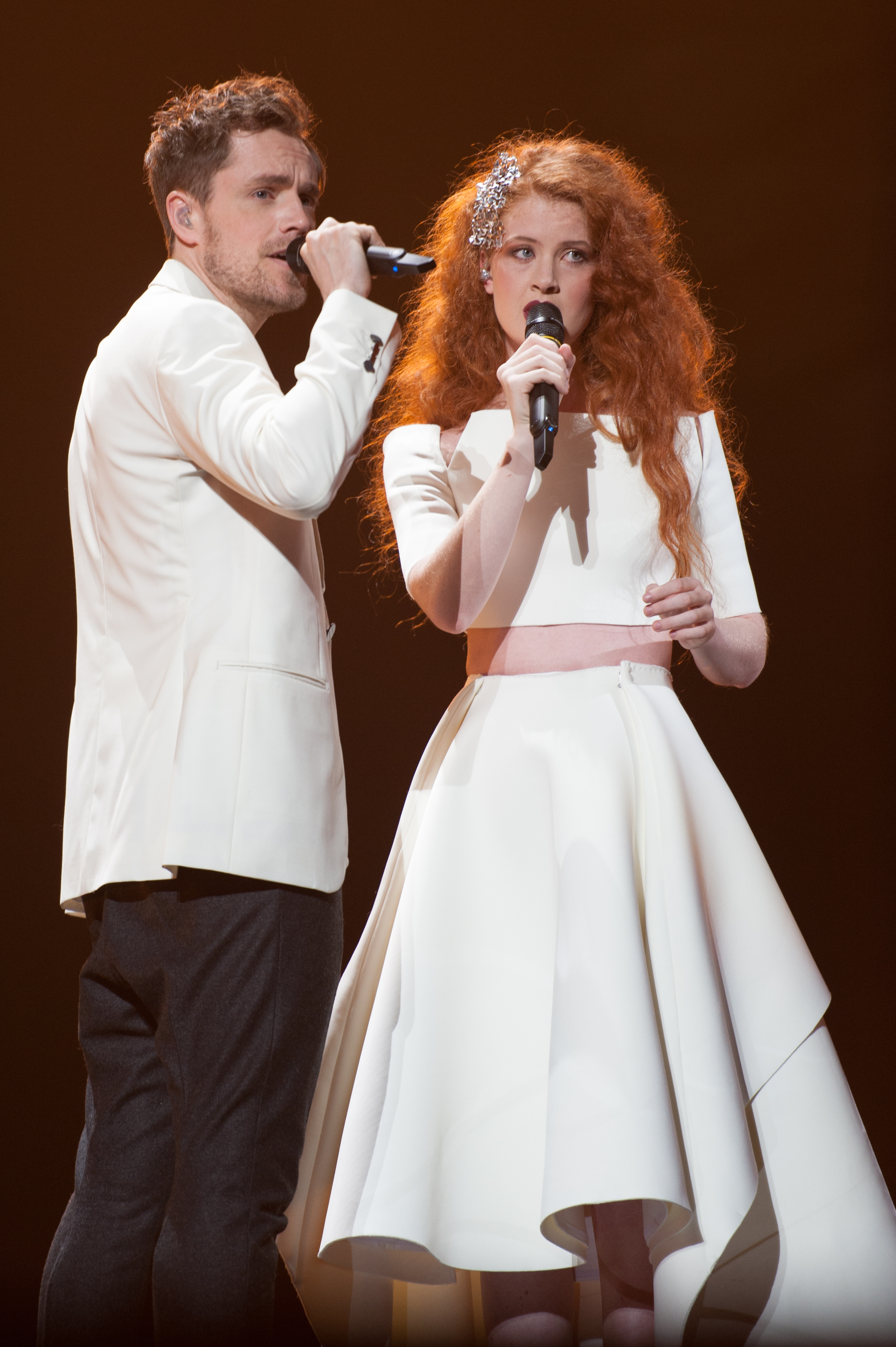
Mørland and Debrah Scarlett during a rehearsal before the second semi-final

Mørland and Debrah Scarlett took part in technical rehearsals on 13 and 16 May, followed by dress rehearsals on 20 and 21 May. This included the jury show on 20 May where the professional juries of each country watched and voted on the competing entries.

The Norwegian performance featured Mørland and Debrah Scarlett performing on stage in costumes designed by Elisabeth Stray Pedersen: Mørland appeared in a white and black suit and Scarlett appeared in a white crop top and skirt with an ornate silver hair clip. The stage colours transitioned from bronze and orange to white towards the end, and most of the performance was filmed using one steadicam. The choreographer of the Norwegian performance, Mattias Carlsson, stated: "all the focus should be on the song and the artists, so we don't think we need any graphics". Mørland and Debrah Scarlett were also joined by four off-stage backing vocalists: Julie Lillehaug Kaasa, May Kristin Kaspersen, Håvard Gryting and Bjørnar Reime.

At the end of the show, Norway was announced as having finished in the top ten and subsequently qualifying for the grand final. It was later revealed that the Norway placed fourth in the semi-final, receiving a total of 123 points.

=== Final ===
Shortly after the second semi-final, a winner's press conference was held for the ten qualifying countries. As part of this press conference, the qualifying artists took part in a draw to determine which half of the grand final they would subsequently participate in. This draw was done in the order the countries were announced during the semi-final. Norway was drawn to compete in the first half. Following this draw, the shows' producers decided upon the running order of the final, as they had done for the semi-finals. Norway was subsequently placed to perform in position 9, following the entry from Serbia and before the entry from Sweden.

Mørland and Debrah Scarlett once again took part in dress rehearsals on 22 and 23 May before the final, including the jury final where the professional juries cast their final votes before the live show. The duet performed a repeat of their semi-final performance during the final on 23 May. At the conclusion of the voting, Norway placed eighth with 102 points.

==== Marcel Bezençon Awards ====
The Marcel Bezençon Awards, first awarded during the 2002 contest, are awards honouring the best competing songs in the final each year. Named after the creator of the annual contest, Marcel Bezençon, the awards are divided into three categories: the Press Award, given to the best entry as voted on by the accredited media and press during the event; the Artistic Award, presented to the best artist as voted on by the shows' commentators; and the Composer Award, given to the best and most original composition as voted by the participating composers. "A Monster Like Me" was awarded the Composer Award, which was accepted at the awards ceremony by the song's composer Kjetil Mørland.

=== Voting ===
Voting during the three shows consisted of 50 percent public televoting and 50 percent from a jury deliberation. The jury consisted of five music industry professionals who were citizens of the country they represent, with their names published before the contest to ensure transparency. This jury was asked to judge each contestant based on: vocal capacity; the stage performance; the song's composition and originality; and the overall impression by the act. In addition, no member of a national jury could be related in any way to any of the competing acts in such a way that they cannot vote impartially and independently. The individual rankings of each jury member were released shortly after the grand final.

Following the release of the full split voting by the EBU after the conclusion of the competition, it was revealed that Norway had placed seventeenth with the public televote and seventh with the jury vote in the final. In the public vote, Norway scored 43 points, while with the jury vote, Norway scored 163 points. In the second semi-final, Norway placed fifth with the public televote with 104 points and third with the jury vote, scoring 144 points.

Below is a breakdown of points awarded to Norway and awarded by Norway in the second semi-final and grand final of the contest, and the breakdown of the jury voting and televoting conducted during the two shows:

==== Points awarded to Norway ====
Points awarded to Norway (Semi-final 2)
Score	Country
12 points	Sweden
10 points	Iceland; Switzerland
8 points	Australia; Lithuania; Portugal; San Marino
7 points	Czech Republic; Germany; Latvia
6 points	Cyprus; Montenegro; Poland; Slovenia
5 points	Malta
4 points	Ireland
3 points	
2 points	Italy; United Kingdom
1 point	Israel

Points awarded to Norway (Final)
Score	Country
12 points	
10 points	Iceland; Switzerland
8 points	
7 points	Sweden
6 points	Portugal; Romania; San Marino
5 points	Italy; Lithuania
4 points	Australia; Austria; Estonia; Finland; Germany; Hungary; Ireland; Slovenia
3 points	Denmark; Netherlands; Poland
2 points	Latvia; Malta; Spain
1 point	

==== Points awarded by Norway ====
Points awarded by Norway (Semi-final 2)
Score	Country
12 points	Sweden
10 points	Lithuania
8 points	Israel
7 points	Latvia
6 points	Cyprus
5 points	Poland
4 points	Slovenia
3 points	Montenegro
2 points	Iceland
1 point	Switzerland

Points awarded by Norway (Final)
Score	Country
12 points	Sweden
10 points	Australia
8 points	Latvia
7 points	Belgium
6 points	Lithuania
5 points	Italy
4 points	Israel
3 points	Estonia
2 points	Russia
1 point	Slovenia

==== Detailed voting results ====
The following members comprised the Norwegian jury:

- Alexander Stenerud (jury chairperson) – singer-songwriter
- Anita Wisløff – booking agent
- Marianne Jemtegård – editor
- Margaret Berger – singer, represented Norway in the 2013 contest
- Sverre Vedal – editor

Detailed voting results from Norway (Semi-final 2)
R/O	Country	A. Stenerud	A. Wisløff	M. Jemtegård	M. Berger	S. Vedal	Jury Rank	Televote Rank	Combined Rank	Points
01	Lithuania	7	4	5	5	4	4	1	2	10
02	Ireland	1	11	12	4	9	8	14	11	
03	San Marino	16	13	16	15	13	16	15	16	
04	Montenegro	15	8	10	10	7	9	9	8	3
05	Malta	6	5	7	6	8	6	16	12	
06	Norway									
07	Portugal	5	16	9	12	10	11	13	14	
08	Czech Republic	13	10	13	14	16	14	10	13	
09	Israel	14	2	2	3	2	3	4	3	8
10	Latvia	2	3	3	2	6	2	5	4	7
11	Azerbaijan	12	9	15	11	11	13	12	15	
12	Iceland	11	15	14	16	15	15	6	9	2
13	Sweden	4	1	1	1	1	1	2	1	12
14	Switzerland	9	12	8	8	14	10	11	10	1
15	Cyprus	10	6	4	7	3	5	7	5	6
16	Slovenia	3	7	6	13	5	7	8	7	4
17	Poland	8	14	11	9	12	12	3	6	5

Detailed voting results from Norway (Final)
R/O	Country	A. Stenerud	A. Wisløff	M. Jemtegård	M. Berger	S. Vedal	Jury Rank	Televote Rank	Combined Rank	Points
01	Slovenia	2	8	7	16	8	7	13	10	1
02	France	26	11	12	13	21	16	24	20	
03	Israel	10	5	4	5	3	4	10	7	4
04	Estonia	20	4	5	11	7	9	9	8	3
05	United Kingdom	25	25	23	25	22	25	19	24	
06	Armenia	24	24	24	23	23	24	26	26	
07	Lithuania	13	7	10	6	6	8	3	5	6
08	Serbia	14	13	14	21	17	15	12	12	
09	Norway									
10	Sweden	3	1	1	1	1	1	1	1	12
11	Cyprus	8	10	6	7	5	6	14	11	
12	Australia	7	3	2	2	2	3	2	2	10
13	Belgium	4	6	11	4	9	5	5	4	7
14	Austria	5	15	9	15	12	12	21	16	
15	Greece	16	22	21	20	16	20	25	25	
16	Montenegro	22	16	20	12	18	17	17	17	
17	Germany	12	14	18	14	13	14	22	18	
18	Poland	21	23	17	22	19	22	7	13	
19	Latvia	1	2	3	3	4	2	6	3	8
20	Romania	17	18	16	24	20	21	11	15	
21	Spain	9	19	15	10	11	13	16	14	
22	Hungary	23	21	26	18	26	23	18	22	
23	Georgia	15	20	19	17	24	19	20	19	
24	Azerbaijan	18	17	22	19	14	18	23	23	
25	Russia	6	9	13	9	15	11	8	9	2
26	Albania	19	26	25	26	25	26	15	21	
27	Italy	11	12	8	8	10	10	4	6	5
