= Tumler =

Tumler is a surname. Notable people with the surname include:

- Alice Tumler (born 1978), French-Austrian TV host
- Thomas Tumler (born 1989), Swiss alpine skier
