= A Monster Like Me =

2015 song by Kjetil Mørland

Single by Mørland and Debrah Scarlett

from the album Make a Sail
- Released: 17 February 2015
- Length: 3:04
- Label: Mørland
- Songwriter: Kjetil Mørland

Mørland singles chronology
"Keep Me Dancing" (2013)	"A Monster Like Me" (2015)	"No Firewall" (2015)

Debrah Scarlett singles chronology
"A Monster Like Me" (2015)	"To Figure" (2016)

Eurovision Song Contest 2015 entry
- Country: Norway
- Artists: Mørland & Debrah Scarlett
- Language: English
- Composer: Kjetil Mørland
- Lyricist: Kjetil Mørland

Finals performance
- Semi-final result: 4th
- Semi-final points: 123
- Final result: 8th
- Final points: 102

Entry chronology
- ◄ "Silent Storm" (2014)
- "Icebreaker" (2016) ►

"A Monster Like Me" is a song written by performed by Norwegian singer Kjetil Mørland and Norwegian-Swiss singer Debrah Scarlett, written by the former. The song represented Norway in the Eurovision Song Contest 2015. It was released as a digital download in Norway on 17 February 2015, later it was included on Mørland's first studio album Make a Sail (2016). The song also won the Marcel Bezençon Composer Award in 2015.

== Melodi Grand Prix 2015 ==
During the Melodi Grand Prix 2015 press conference on 21 January 2015, "A Monster Like Me" was announced as one of the eleven songs competing to represent Norway in the Eurovision Song Contest 2015 in Vienna, Austria. The song was performed ninth in the running order and was one of the four songs that continued to the Gold Final. "A Monster Like Me" received 88,869 votes overall, only 3,496 votes ahead of the runner-up, and won the opportunity to compete in Vienna.

After winning Melodi Grand Prix, the song peaked at number 24 on the VG-lista chart.

== Music video ==
A music video to accompany the release of "A Monster Like Me" was first released onto YouTube on 20 February 2015 at a total length of three minutes and thirteen seconds. It shows the two singers preparing to have guests over for dinner as Scarlett pours a vial of red liquid into the water goblets during the climax of the song the guests at the table begin to behave strangely as Morland and Scarlett sit oblivious to all the chaos.

== Charts ==
Chart performance for "A Monster Like Me"
Chart (2015)	Peak position
Austria (Ö3 Austria Top 40)	17
Belgium (Ultratip Flanders)	37
Germany (GfK)	92
Iceland (RÚV)	3
Norway (VG-lista)	23
Sweden Heatseeker (Sverigetopplistan)	2
Switzerland (Schweizer Hitparade)	45

== Certifications ==
Certifications for "A Monster Like Me"
Region	Certification	Certified units/sales
Norway (IFPI Norway)	Platinum	40,000^{‡}
^{‡} Sales+streaming figures based on certification alone.

== Release history ==
Release history for "A Monster Like Me"
Region	Date	Format	Label
Norway	17 February 2015	Digital download	Mørland
