= Contrazt =

Norwegian dance band

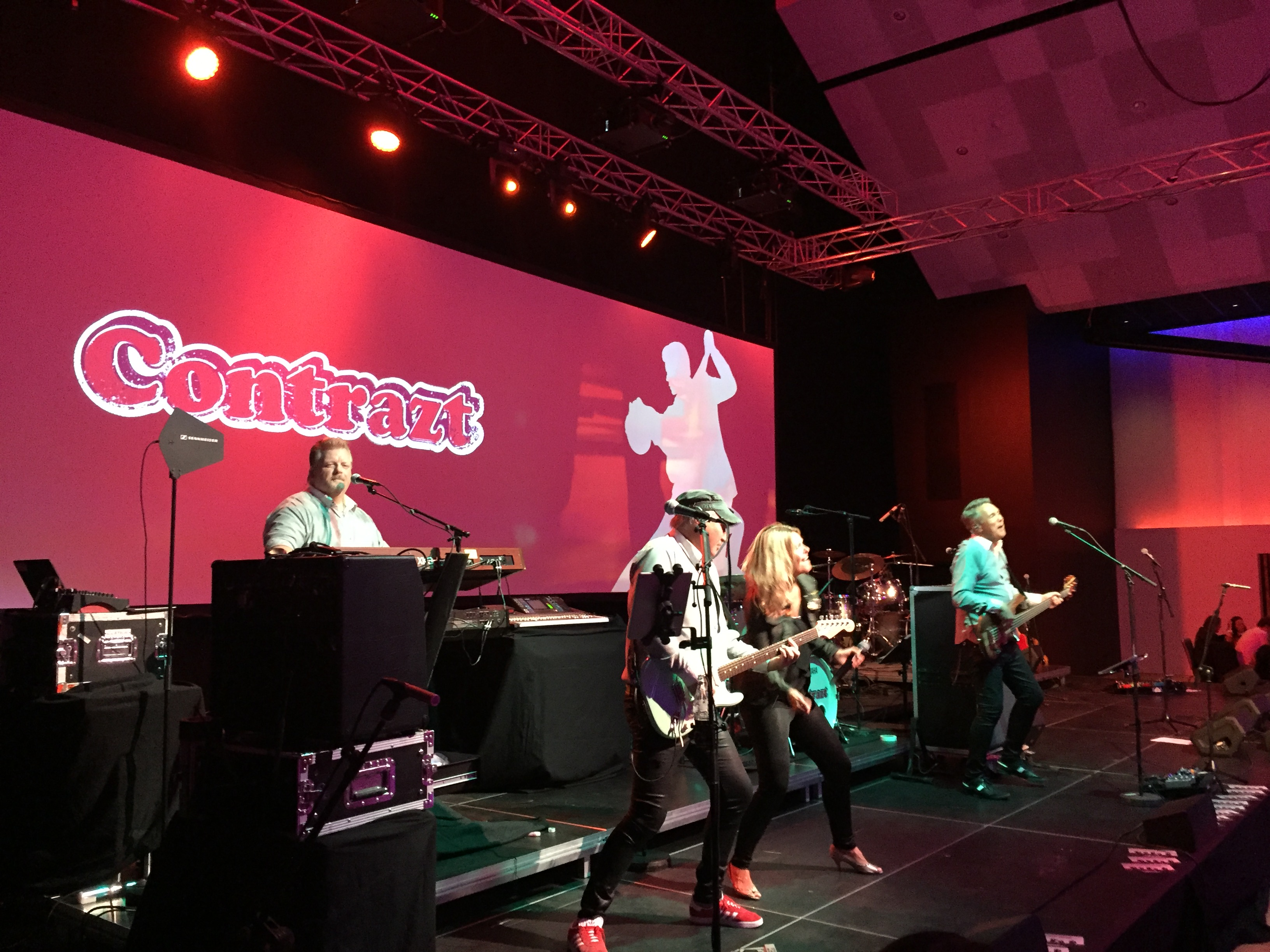
- Live concert by Contrazt in 2018

Background information
- Origin: Solør, Norway
- Genres: Dansband music
- Years active: 2004–

Contrazt is a Norwegian dansband from Solør, formed in 2004. The group originated when Hanne Mette Gunnarsrud and Leif Dybendal from the duo Fullt og helt decided to expand and change the name. Three new guys joined when the group Contrazt occurred.

Contrazt's first album, Kan du prøve å forstå was released in 2006. Another album, Leve livet, was released the following year, followed in 2008 by Sommernatt. After five years on the road and three albums Gunnarsrud decided to stop to prioritize family.

Gro Anita Johansen took over as lead singer. Her first album with Contrazt was Uten kart og kompass. The band's fifth album, 2010's Ser på verden, went gold in four weeks. In 2011, the album Har det på G won Contrazt the 2011 award as Folk, Golden Boot. In 2012, the group released their eighth album, Contrazt – I hundre. Contrazt was named Folk, Gullskoen 2012. Contrazt were selected to perform at the final of Melodi Grand Prix 2015 on 14 March, with their song "Heaven".

== Albums ==
List of albums, with selected chart positions
Title	Album details	Peak chart positions	Certifications
Title	Album details	NOR	Certifications
Uten kart og kompass	Released: 2009	18	
Ser på verden	Released: 2010	4	IFPI NOR: Gold
Har det på G	Released: 2011	3	IFPI NOR: Gold
I hundre	Released: 2012	4	IFPI NOR: Gold
På vår måte	Released: 2013	5	
Før sola går ned	Released: 2016	22	
