= Kjetil Mørland =

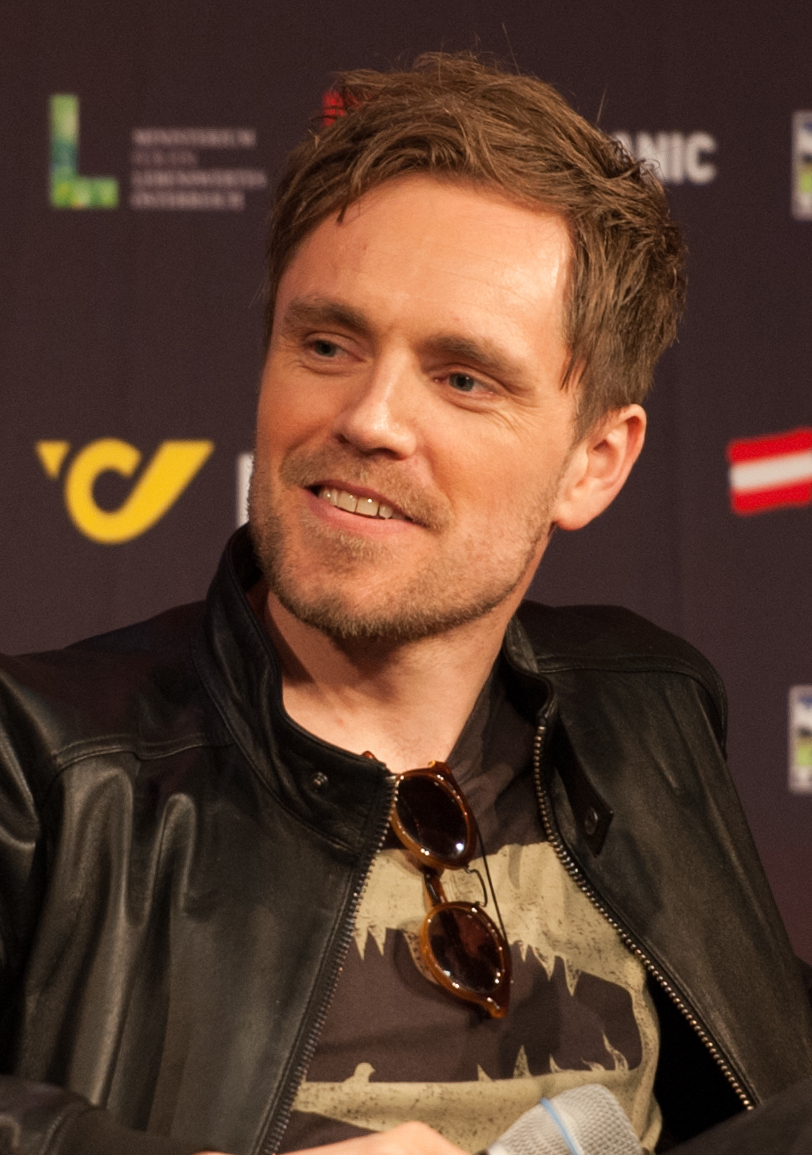
- Mørland in 2015

Background information
- Also known as: Mørland
- Born: Kjetil Mørland; 3 October 1980 (age 46); Grimstad, Norway
- Origin: Brighton, England, UK
- Genres: Pop; folk rock; alternative rock
- Occupations: Singer; songwriter
- Instruments: Vocals; guitar; piano
- Years active: 2008–present
- Website: morlandmusic.com

Kjetil Mørland (born 3 October 1980), better known as simply Mørland, is a Norwegian singer and songwriter. He represented Norway in the Eurovision Song Contest 2015 along with Debrah Scarlett with his song "A Monster Like Me".

== Career ==
Mørland fronted the band Absent Elk from its 2008 inception, releasing the album Caught in the Headlights in the spring of 2009. The band supported The Script, The Hoosiers and Girls Aloud on UK tours before going on to tour the UK themselves in June 2009.

In 2015 Mørland wrote "A Monster Like Me", and performed it at Melodi Grand Prix as a duet with Debrah Scarlett. They won the competition with 88,869 votes and represented Norway in the Eurovision Song Contest 2015 in Vienna. The duo performed in the second semi-final and qualified to the final on 23 May 2015, in which they placed 8th.

In January 2018, he was credited as the writer and producer of Melodi Grand Prix 2018 entry "Who We Are" performed by 19 year old singer Rebecca. The song competed at the Oslo Spektrum on 10 March 2018, and finished in 2nd place behind the eventual winner Alexander Rybak.

Mørland returned to Melodi Grand Prix as an artist in 2019, with the self-written song "En livredd mann". The song competed in the final in Oslo Spektrum on 2 March 2019, but did not advance from the first round. In the same contest, he was also credited as a writer of Adrian Jørgensen song "Bubble", alongside Jonas McDonnell and Aleksander Walmann. The song placed second behind Keiino song "Spirit in the Sky".

In February 2020, he was credited as a writer and composer of the song "Attention" by Ulrikke Brandstorp, alongside Brandstorp herself and Christian Ingebrigtsen. The song competed in the grand final of Melodi Grand Prix 2020 at Trondheim Spektrum on 15 February 2020, winning with 200,345 votes, and was therefore selected to represent Norway in the Eurovision Song Contest 2020 in Rotterdam. However, on 18 March 2020, the event was cancelled due to the COVID-19 pandemic.

In 2021 he returned once again to Melodi Grand Prix as a songwriter alongside Ingebritsen and singer Rein Alexander with the song "Eyes Wide Open" which qualified automatically for the final celebrated on 20 February 2021. The song failed to qualify to the Gold Final thus, it stayed out of the competition.

In 2022 it was announced that he is taking part as a co-writer and producer in Eesti Laul 2023 for "House Of Glass" performed by Janek (Janek Valgepea).

== Discography ==
=== Studio albums ===
Title	Details
Make a Sail	Released: 27 May 2016; Label: Morland Music; Format: digital download

=== Extended plays ===
Title	Details
Mørland	Released: 8 April 2013; Format: digital download

=== Singles ===
Title	Year	Peak chart positions				Certifications	Album
Title	Year	NOR	AUT	GER	SWI	Certifications	Album
"Keep Me Dancing"	2013	—	—	—	—		Make a Sail
"A Monster Like Me" (with Debrah Scarlett)	2015	23	17	92	45	IFPI NOR: Platinum	Make a Sail
"No Firewall"	2015	—	—	—	—		Make a Sail
"Skin"	2016	—	—	—	—		Make a Sail
"Make a Sail"	2016	—	—	—	—		Make a Sail
"Leo"	2018	—	—	—	—		Non-album singles
"If Music Could Save You"	2019	—	—	—	—		Non-album singles
"En livredd mann"	2019	—	—	—	—		Non-album singles
"How to Lose Something Good" (with Miia)	2019	—	—	—	—		Non-album singles

=== Songwriting credits ===
Title	Year	Artist(s)	Album	Written with
"Who We Are"	2018	Rebecca	Non-album single	—N/a
"The Show"	2018	Rebecca	Non-album single	Rebecca Thorsen
"The Bubble"	2019	Adrian Jørgensen	Non-album single	Jonas McDonnell, Aleksander Walmann
"Attention"	2020	Ulrikke	Non-album single	Ulrikke Brandstorp, Christian Ingebrigtsen
"Worry a Little Less"	2020	Max and Harvey	Non-album single	Max Mills, Harvey Mills, Alex Shield, Charlotte Kjær
"In My DNA"	2021	Max and Harvey	Non-album single	Max Mills, Harvey Mills
"Eyes Wide Open"	2021	Rein Alexander	Non-album single	Rein Alexander, Christian Ingebrigtsen
"On the Surface"	2021	Jo O'Meara	With Love	Jo O'Meara, Nicky Mac
"Closer"	2021	Jo O'Meara	With Love	Jo O'Meara, Nicky Mac
"Pieces"	2021	Jo O'Meara	With Love	Jo O'Meara, Nicky Mac
"Sweet Surrender"	2021	Jo O'Meara	With Love	Jo O'Meara, Nicky Mac
"Lay Your Hurt on Me"	2021	Jo O'Meara	With Love	Jo O'Meara, Paul Meehan
"Who's Gonna Love Me Now?"	2021	James Morrison	Greatest Hits	James Morrison, Paul Meehan
"Made of Glass"	2022	Sofie Fjellvang	Run	Sofie Fjellvang
"Find Someone Better"	2022	Sofie Fjellvang	Run	Sofie Fjellvang
"An Eye for an Eye"	2022	Sofie Fjellvang	Run	Sofie Fjellvang, Marie Wegener, Maria Broberg
"Run"	2022	Sofie Fjellvang	Run	Sofie Fjellvang
"Worth the Wait"	2022	Christopher	Non-album single	Christopher Grevener
"Something Tells Me"	2022	Erlend Gunstveit	Coming Home	Erlend Gunstveit
"House of Glass"	2022	Janek	Non-album single	Janek Valgepea
"Tårer i paradis"	2023	Kate Gulbrandsen	Non-album single	Kate Gulbrandsen
"Statues"	2023	Andrei Duțu	Non-album single	Aidan O'Connor
"Paradise"	2023	Onew	Circle	Paul Meehan, Ethan Basden, Hautboi Rich
"No Sour"	2026	XO	Need to Know	Rachel Furner, Paul Meehan

== See also ==
- Norway in the Eurovision Song Contest 2015

Awards and achievements
Preceded by Carl Espen with "Silent Storm"	Norway in the Eurovision Song Contest; 2015 (with Debrah Scarlett)	Succeeded by Agnete with "Icebreaker"
