= Alice Tumler =

Austrian television presenter (born 1978)

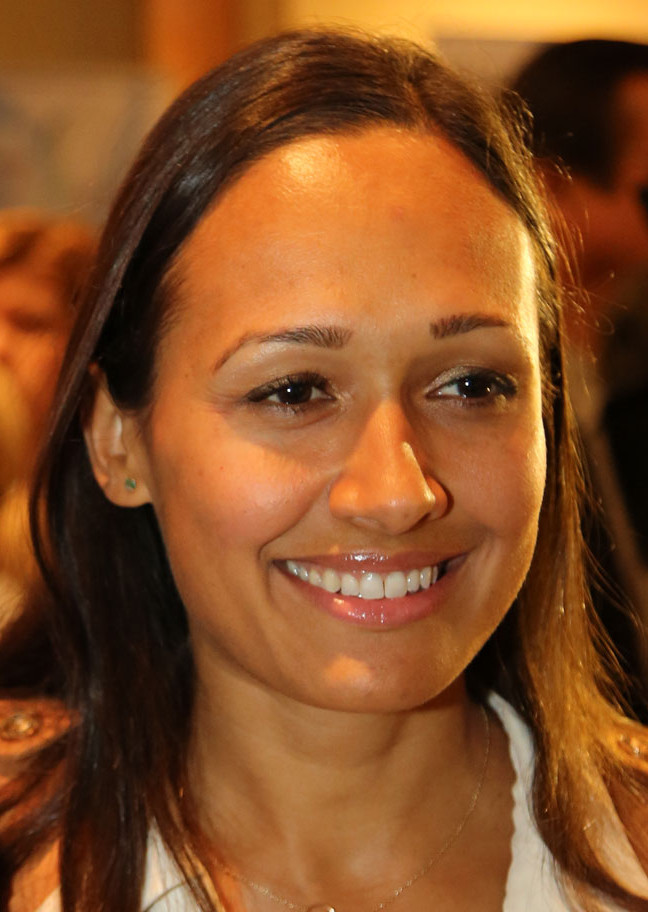
- Born: 11 November 1978 (age 47); Innsbruck, Austria
- Television: TV shows : Eurovision 2015, Thalassa, ONE SHOT NOT TV channels : France TV, ARTE, ORF, TRACE TV
- Website: https://www.alicetumler.com

Alice Tumler (born 11 November 1978), is a French-Austrian TV host, public speaking and authenticity coach and a keynote speaker.

== Early life, education and the beginning of her media career ==
Alice Tumler was born on 11 November 1978 in Innsbruck, Austria, and is the daughter of a Martinican-French mother and an Austrian-Slovene father.

After her high school graduation in Austria she moves to London to study Mass Communications and Cultural Studies at the University of North London. She continues her higher education in Paris at the renowned drama school Cours Florent.

In 2003, she joins the local French West Indian radio and TV network RFO Martinique and hosts a radio program for young people for several months.

== Career ==
In 2004 Alice Tumler joins TRACE TV in Paris to record voice-overs in French, English and German and hosts her first minor shows as a TV host.

The same year, she hosts her first weekly show “Le monde en direct” on French TV channel VOYAGE.

In December 2004 she co-hosts the KORA All African Music Awards, the biggest pan-African music prize, in Johannesburg, South Africa.

After a two-year break, during which she travels through South America and Asia, she is spotted by the French production company KM Production and joins the French-German cultural channel ARTE to co-host the music program ONE SHOT NOT together with French drummer Manu Katché in French, English and German.

Between 2007 and 2014 Alice Tumler presents all sorts of different music shows and cultural events on ARTE, such as ARTE Lounge, the Montreux Jazz Festival, Les Vielles Charrues, the Hell Fest, the Jazz Open Stuttfart, “La Bohème en banlieu” or “Musik entdecken mit Thomas Hengelbrock: Romeo und Julia”.

In 2010 she travels along the Argentinian and Brazilian coast to shoot travel documentaries for THALASSA on France 3.

After giving birth to her first daughter she integrates the Austrian public service ORF in 2013 and host the prime-time entertainment show “Die grosse Chance”.

In Austria, her notoriety grows quickly and her international and multilingual personality enable her to present numerous international TV shows, such as the “Life Ball”, the world's biggest charity event in the fight against AIDS.

After Conchita Wurst's victory at the Eurovision Song Contest 2014, Alice Tumler was selected to be one of the hosts of the 60th Eurovision Song Contest in Vienna, Austria, in 2015 together with Arabella Kiesbauer and Mirjam Weichselbraun. When the audience booed Russian performer Polina Gagarina, Tumler asked the crowd to remember that year's theme of “building bridges” and focus on the music, not politics.

After Eurovision, Alice Tumler decides to withdraw for the small screen. She gives birth to her second daughter in 2016 and returns to the stage only for a selection of committed international events, such as the Austrian World Summit In Vienna in 2017, organized by Arnold Schwarzenegger, or the « INDEX : Design to Improve Life Award » in Copenhagen the same year, during which she shares the stage with Princess Mary of Denmark.

In December 2017 she is invited to interview French president Emmanuel Macron in Accra, Ghana for the program “TRACE Meets Macron” – an exchange between the president and the African youth.

== Public speaking coaching, personal growth and conferences ==
Alice Tumler puts her TV career aside in order to commit herself to her personal projects. She develops her own coaching method “Authentic Expression by Alice Tumler”, mixing public speaking and personal growth.

She is a professional speaker who regular speaks on the subject of authenticity.

Her first show, a conference with a stand-up comedy twist, is entitled “Quand je serai grande, je serai comme moi-même” (“When I grow up, I'll be like myself.”)

== Personal life ==
Alice Tumler lives in Lyon together with her partner Francis Nyock and their two daughters Tia, born in 2011, and Lilo, born in 2016.

She speaks four languages fluently: German, French, English and Italian, and is able to also communicate in Spanish and Portuguese.

== Television shows ==
Date	Show	Channel
June 2018	Life Ball : Der Auftakt	ORF
December 2017	TRACE Meets Macron	TRACE TV
February 2016	Wer singt für Österreich ?	ORF
May 2015	Eurovision Song Contest	ORF, broadcast all over the world
May 2015	Life Ball	ORF
February 2015	Musik entdecken mit Thomas Hengelbrock: Romeo und Julia	ARTE, Doclights
May 2014	Europe Sings	ORF, broadcast across Europe
May 2014	Life Ball – Der Auftakt	ORF
2013-2014	Die Grosse Chance	ORF
July 2013	Jazz Open Stuttgart	ARTE, Opus Stuttgart
December 2012	Un Prince presque parfait, officiel preview	Renault TV, Publicis, Zodiak
November 2012	Apocalypse Flash Infos	ARTE, Program33
2012-2014	ARTE Lounge	ARTE, studio.tv.film
July 2012	Les Vieilles Charrues	ARTE, Sombrero
June 2012	Hellfest	ARTE, Sombrero
June–September 2010	Thalassa	France Télévision, Bonne Pioche
2007-2010	ONE SHOT NOT	ARTE, KM
December 2009	Fiesta Cubana Réveillon 2009	ARTE, EuroArts
September 2009	La Bohème en banlieue	ARTE, SF, TSR
July 2009	Montreux Jazz Festival	ARTE, TSR
June 2009	Pari Roller	Renault TV, RDF Media
May 2009	Cannes Film Festival	Renault TV, RDF Media
February 2009	London Fashion Week	Renault TV, RDF Media
October 2008	Rock in the City	ARTE, Morgane Production
July 2008	Paleo Festival	ARTE, Sombrero Productions
December 2004	KORA All African Music Award	TRACE TV, SABC
2004-2005	Le Monde en direct	Voyage
2004-2006	Voice overs	TRACE TV

== Event hosting ==
Date	Event	Place
September 2017	INDEX:Design to Improve Life Award 2017	INDEX, Copenhaguen
June 2017	R20 -Austrian World Summit Vienna	
January 2013	Visionary Monday, MIDEM	Reed Midem
2012	German High Tech Champion Award, Pollutec Lyon, organised by Fraunhofer Research	

== Radio productions ==
2003 : « Missié Polo » - RFO Martinique

== Rewards ==
2015 : Tirolerin des Jahres
