= Debrah Scarlett =

Red Moon
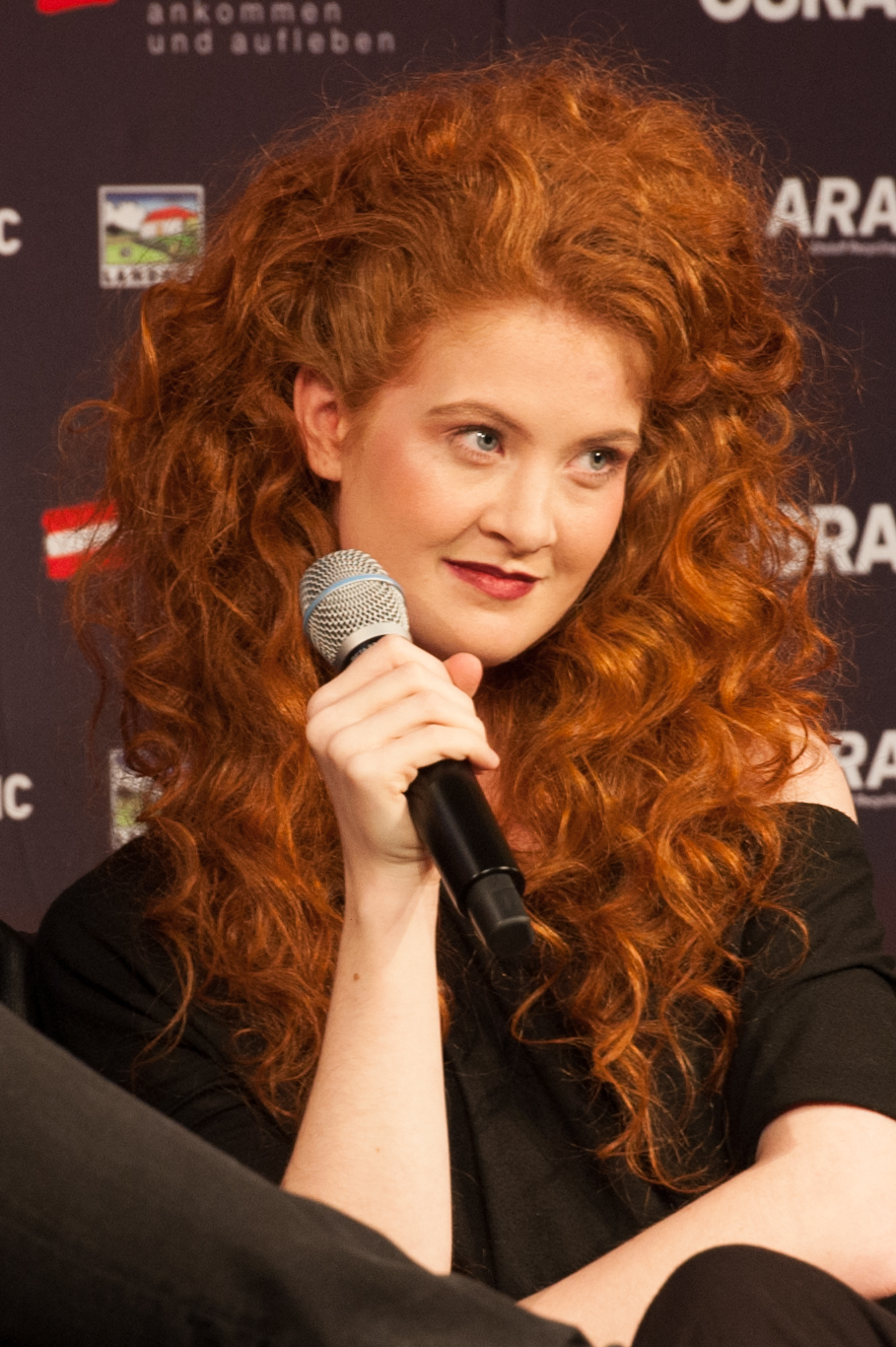
- Debrah Scarlett in 2015

Background information
- Also known as: Debrah Scarlett
- Born: Joanna-Deborah Bussinger; 20 July 1993 (age 33); Basel, Switzerland
- Origin: Hakadal, Norway
- Genres: Pop, indie pop, alternative pop
- Occupations: Singer; songwriter
- Instruments: Vocals, Piano
- Years active: 2013–present
- Label: Decca Records

Joanna Deborah Bussinger (born 20 July 1993), known professionally as Debrah Scarlett and as of 2019 known under the moniker Red Moon, is a Norwegian-Swiss singer and songwriter. She represented Norway in the Eurovision Song Contest 2015 along with Mørland with the song "A Monster Like Me". She competed on the Norwegian version of The Voice in 2013. Since 2020, she has been releasing music as Red Moon.

== Personal life ==
Joanna was born in Basel, Switzerland, in 1993 to Norwegian parents. They returned to Norway when she was six years old. She returned later to Switzerland at the age of ten.

== Discography ==
=== EPs ===
EP /Album Title	artist name	tracks	Album details
DYS(U)TOPIA	DEBRAH SCARLETT	4 songs	Released: 17 March 2017; Label: Radicalis; Formats: Digital download

EP /Album Title	artist name	tracks	Album details
PHASE I:XI	RED MOON	6 songs	Released: 9 October 2020; Label: Decca Records; Formats: Digital download

EP /Album Title	artist name	tracks	Album details
PHASE 2:22	RED MOON	4 songs	Released: 17 September 2021; Label: Decca Records; Formats: Digital download

=== Singles ===
Title	Year	Peak chart positions					Certifications	Album
Title	Year	NOR	AUT	GER	SWE	SWI	Certifications	Album
"A Monster Like Me" (with Mørland)	2015	23	17	92	— (Note: "A Monster Like Me" did not enter the Sverigetopplistan, but peaked at number 2 on the Swedish Heatseekers chart.)	45	IFPI NOR: Platinum	Make a Sail
"To Figure"	2016	—	—	—	—	—		Non-album single
"Cynical Youth"	2017	—	—	—	—	—		DYS(U)TOPIA
"—" denotes a recording that did not chart or was not released in that territory.

== See also ==
- Norway in the Eurovision Song Contest 2015

== Notes ==
Awards and achievements
Preceded by Carl Espen with "Silent Storm"	Norway in the Eurovision Song Contest; 2015 (with Mørland)	Succeeded by Agnete with "Icebreaker"
