= Voyage.tv =

American online travel channel

Voyage.tv is an online travel channel that produces and distributes travel video programming on the Internet, cable television, and Video on Demand. Functioning as a tool for exploring destinations, sharing travel experiences, and booking trips, Voyage.tv is a global platform for travelers to exchange advice and access an inside look at destinations around the world. It was founded in 2006 and is headquartered in New York City.

== Program categories ==
Destination Videos fall within several branded program categories:

- 72-Hours highlights top attractions or things to do within a destination
- Conversations With features interviews with notable people within destinations
- Earth Calling includes eco-centric and "green" programming
- Goodlife highlights luxury and upscale lifestyle experiences in each destination
- Gourmet Regionale showcases restaurants and dining around the world
- Guy Stuff focuses on activities and content for a male demographic
- Kidz highlights attractions and activities geared towards children and families
- Look centers on fashion, style and shopping programming
- Nirvana features spas and treatments around the world

== Articles and editorial content ==
Video segments are accompanied by an array of articles written by resident editors within each destination and journalists that include travel writing on dining, nightlife, spas, area excursions, attractions, sightseeing, tours, shopping and other lifestyle interests.

== Distribution ==
Voyage.tv also has a branded YouTube channel (VoyageChannel), which broadcasts select videos from Voyage's slate and provides an alternate portal for viewers to access the content.
