= Olav Viksmo-Slettan =

Norwegian radio and television reporter

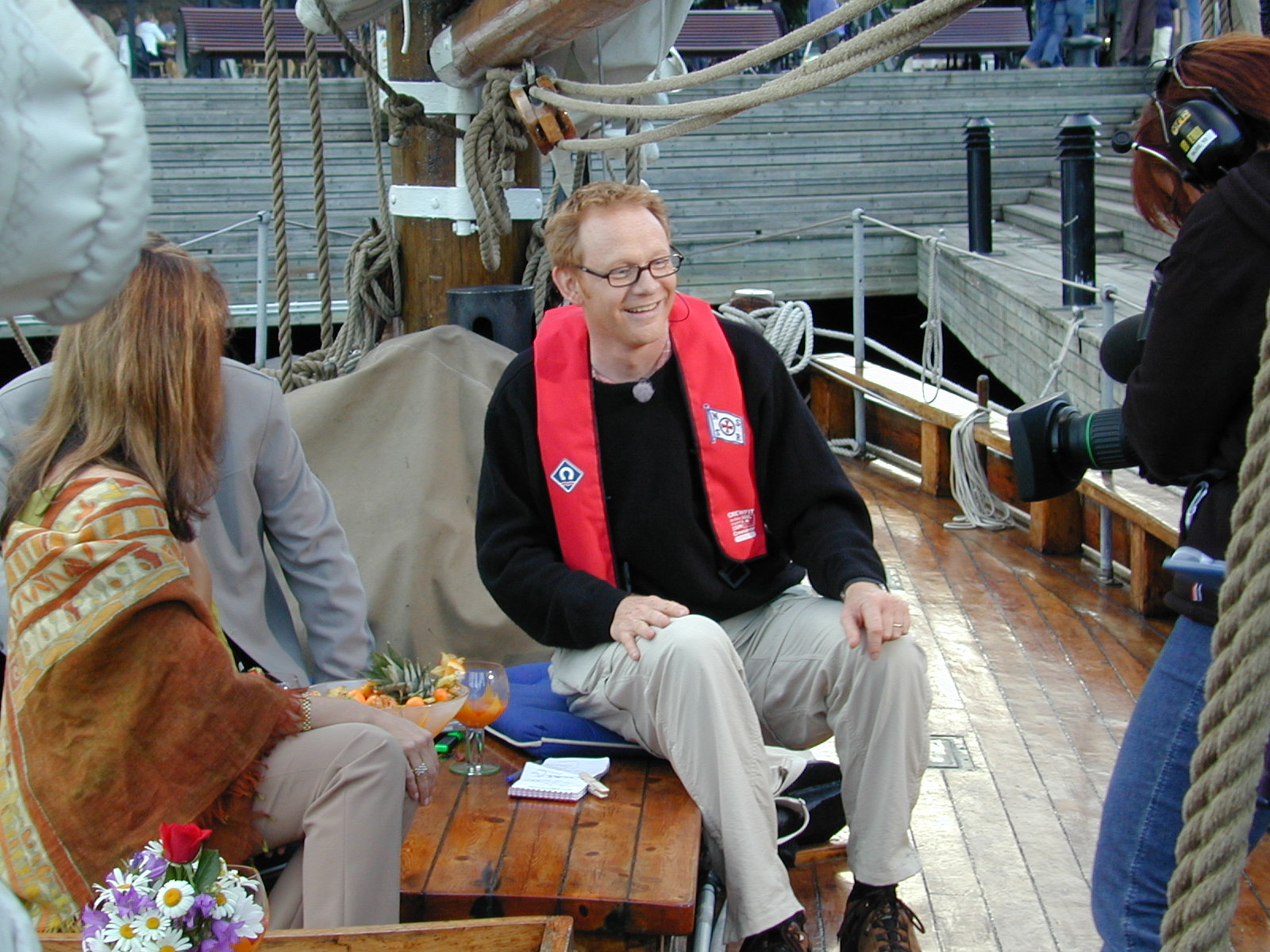
- Born: Tolga
- Occupations: Radio and television reporter, writer

Olav Viksmo-Slettan (born Tolga) is a Norwegian radio and television reporter for the Norwegian Broadcasting Corporation.

Starting his radio career for Radio Vest, he later worked as program director for the television series Reparatørene and Sommer-Lørdag, as well as presenter and reporter for the radio programs Reiseradioen and Nitimen. In 2000, together with Børge Ousland, he was one of the first persons to live broadcast a North Pole-expedition. From 2010 to 2019 he functioned as NRK's commentator for the international music competition Eurovision Song Contest.

In addition to working in the media, Viksmo-Slettan is also an author, and has written several books.

== Bibliography ==
- Du skjødded iggetigg! (1999) Together with Hans-Petter Jørgensen
- Pappa (2001)
- Reparatørene (2002)
- En fin dag for fotball (2003) Together with Arne Scheie
- Hevnerens håndbok (2005)
- Den bemerkelsesverdige historien om Dingo Mortmann (2006)
- Norske Blinkskudd (2008)
