= Austria in the Eurovision Song Contest 2012 =

- Eurovision Song Contest 2012
- Participating broadcaster: Österreichischer Rundfunk (ORF)
- Country: Austria
- Selection process: Österreich rockt den Song Contest
- Selection date: 24 February 2012

Competing entry
- Song: "Woki mit deim Popo"
- Artist: Trackshittaz
- Songwriters: Lukas Plöchl; Manuel Hoffelner

Placement
- Semi-final result: Failed to qualify (18th)

Participation chronology

Austria was represented at the Eurovision Song Contest 2012 with the song "Woki mit deim Popo" written by Lukas Plöchl and Manuel Hoffelner. The song was performed by the duo Trackshittaz. The Austrian broadcaster Österreichischer Rundfunk (ORF) organised the national final Österreich rockt den Song Contest in order to select the Austrian entry for the 2012 contest in Baku, Azerbaijan. Ten songs competed in a televised show where a public vote first selected the top two entries to proceed to a second round of voting. In the second round, "Woki mit deim Popo" was selected as the winner after gaining 51% of the votes from a public vote. This was the first time that the Austrian song was performed entirely in the Mühlviertlerisch dialect at the Eurovision Song Contest.

Austria was drawn to compete in the first semi-final of the Eurovision Song Contest which took place on 22 May 2012. Performing during the show in position 16, "Woki mit deim Popo" was not announced among the top 10 entries of the first semi-final and therefore did not qualify to compete in the final. It was later revealed that Austria placed eighteenth (last) out of the 18 participating countries in the semi-final with 8 points.

== Background ==
Prior to the 2012 contest, Austria has participated in the Eurovision Song Contest forty-four times since its first entry in 1957. The nation has won the contest on one occasion: in 1966 with the song "Merci, Chérie" performed by Udo Jürgens. Following the introduction of semi-finals for the 2004 contest, Austria has featured in only two finals. Austria's least successful result has been last place, which they have achieved on seven occasions, most recently in 1991. Austria has also received nul points on three occasions; in 1962, 1988 and 1991.

The Austrian national broadcaster, Österreichischer Rundfunk (ORF), broadcasts the event within Austria and organises the selection process for the nation's entry. ORF confirmed their intentions to participate at the 2012 Eurovision Song Contest on 23 September 2011. From 2002 to 2005, ORF set up public national finals with several artists to choose both the song and performer to compete at Eurovision for Austria. For the 2007 Eurovision Song Contest, ORF held an internal selection to choose the artist and song to represent Austria at the contest. In 2011, the broadcaster returned to selecting the Austrian entry through a national final. Along with their participation confirmation, the broadcaster announced that the Austrian entry for the 2012 contest would be selected through a national final.

== Before Eurovision ==
=== Österreich rockt den Song Contest ===
Österreich rockt den Song Contest (Austria rocks the Song Contest) was the national final that selected Austria's entry for the Eurovision Song Contest 2012. The competition took place on 24 February 2012 at the ORF Center in Vienna, hosted by Mirjam Weichselbraun and Robert Kratky with Andi Knoll hosting from the green room. The show was broadcast on ORF eins as well as streamed online via ORF's official website and the official Eurovision Song Contest website eurovision.tv. The first part of the national final was watched by 543,000 viewers in Austria with a market share of 20%, while the second part was watched by 709,000 viewers in Austria with a market share of 36%.

==== Competing entries ====
Nine of the ten artists were nominated by the radio station Ö3, while a tenth act was chosen through a wildcard selection. For the wildcard selection, ORF invited all interested artists to submit their songs to the broadcaster between 1 December 2011 and 31 December 2011. The broadcaster received over 100 submissions at the close of the deadline, which were reviewed by the Ö3 team. The nine nominated artists were revealed on 1 December 2011 during the radio show Ö3-Wecker, aired on Ö3, while "How Can You Ask Me?" performed by Mary Broadcast Band was revealed on 9 January 2012 as the winner of the wildcard selection. Vera Böhnisch had initially been selected for the competition, but she withdrew prior to the announcement of the nominated artists. The presentation of the songs took place on 10 January 2012 during Ö3-Wecker.

On 29 January 2012, ORF announced that "Crazy Swing" performed by !DelaDap had been disqualified from the national final as the song had been performed before 1 September 2011. The band would remain in the competition but with the song "Don't Turn Around" instead.

Artist	Song	Songwriter(s)
3punkt5	"Augenblick"	Benjamin Koeberlein, Benno Calmbach, Doreen Steinert, Dragan Jurić, Marko Grgić, Paul-Maria Becker, Paul Würdig, Wassif Hoteit
Conchita Wurst	"That's What I Am"	Florian Cojocaru, Martin Kromar, Thomas Neuwirth
!DelaDap	"Don't Turn Around"	Melinda Stoika, Stanislav Vana
James Cottriall	"Stand Up"	James Cottriall
Krautschädl	"Einsturzgefohr"	Lukas Plescher, Philipp Sikora, Stefan Sonntagbauer
Mary Broadcast Band	"How Can You Ask Me?"	Alexander Kahr, Mary Lamaro
Norbert Schneider	"Medicate My Blues Away"	Norbert Schneider
Papermoon	"Vater, Father, mon père"	Edina Thalhammer, Christof Straub
Trackshittaz	"Woki mit deim Popo"	Lukas Plöchl, Manuel Hoffelner
Valérie	"Comme ça"	Georg Hartwig

==== Final ====
The televised final took place on 24 February 2012. Ten songs competed in the first round where the top two were selected by a public vote to proceed to the second round. In the second round, public televoting again selected "Woki mit deim Popo" performed by Trackshittaz as the winner. Viewers were able to vote via telephone or SMS during both rounds. "Woki mit deim Popo" became Austria's first entry in the contest to be performed in Mühlviertlerisch, a Central Bavarian dialect spoken in Upper Austria.

First Round – 24 February 2012
R/O	Artist	Song	Result
1	James Cottriall	"Stand Up"	—N/a
2	Krautschädl	"Einsturzgefohr"	—N/a
3	Valérie	"Comme ça"	—N/a
4	3punkt5	"Augenblick"	—N/a
5	Conchita Wurst	"That's What I Am"	Advanced
6	Mary Broadcast Band	"How Can You Ask Me?"	—N/a
7	!DelaDap	"Don't Turn Around"	—N/a
8	Papermoon	"Vater, Father, mon père"	—N/a
9	Trackshittaz	"Woki mit deim Popo"	Advanced
10	Norbert Schneider	"Medicate My Blues Away"	—N/a

Second Round – 24 February 2012
R/O	Artist	Song	Televote	Place
1	Conchita Wurst	"That's What I Am"	49%	2
2	Trackshittaz	"Woki mit deim Popo"	51%	1

=== Promotion ===
Trackshittaz made several appearances across Europe to specifically promote "Woki mit deim Popo" as the Austrian Eurovision entry. On 21 April, Trackshittaz performed during the Eurovision in Concert event which was held at the Melkweg venue in Amsterdam, Netherlands and hosted by Ruth Jacott and Cornald Maas. On 29 April, Trackshittaz performed during the London Eurovision Party, which was held at the Shadow Lounge venue in London, United Kingdom and hosted by Nicki French and Paddy O'Connell. In addition to their international appearances, a farewell party was held for Trackshittaz on 9 May before they travelled to Baku for the contest, which was hosted by Andi Knoll.

== At Eurovision ==
According to Eurovision rules, all nations with the exceptions of the host country and the "Big Five" (France, Germany, Italy, Spain and the United Kingdom) are required to qualify from one of two semi-finals in order to compete for the final; the top ten countries from each semi-final progress to the final. The European Broadcasting Union (EBU) split up the competing countries into six different pots based on voting patterns from previous contests, with countries with favourable voting histories put into the same pot. On 25 January 2012, a special allocation draw was held which placed each country into one of the two semi-finals, as well as which half of the show they would perform in. Austria was placed into the first semi-final, to be held on 22 May 2012, and was scheduled to perform in the second half of the show. The running order for the semi-finals was decided through another draw on 20 March 2012 and Austria was set to perform in position 16, following the entry from Hungary and before the entry from Moldova.

The two semi-finals and the final were broadcast in Austria on ORF eins with commentary by Andi Knoll. The Austrian spokesperson, who announced the Austrian votes during the final, was Kati Bellowitsch.

=== Semi-final ===
Trackshittaz took part in technical rehearsals on 14 and 18 May, followed by dress rehearsals on 21 and 22 May. This included the jury show on 21 May where the professional juries of each country watched and voted on the competing entries.

The Austrian performance featured the members of Trackshittaz performing with three female pole dancers around the five poles on stage. The performers were in LED costumes attached with lines of white and yellow lights, with a tunnel effect with alternate flashing stripes and spotlights appearing on the LED screens. The three pole dancers that joined Trackshittaz were: Bianca Borghesi, Conny Aitzetmüller and Marie-Therese Leopoldsberger.

At the end of the show, Austria was not announced among the top 10 entries in the first semi-final and therefore failed to qualify to compete in the final. It was later revealed that Austria placed eighteenth (last) in the semi-final, receiving a total of 8 points.

=== Voting ===
Voting during the three shows consisted of 50 percent public televoting and 50 percent from a jury deliberation. The jury consisted of five music industry professionals who were citizens of the country they represent. This jury was asked to judge each contestant based on: vocal capacity; the stage performance; the song's composition and originality; and the overall impression by the act. In addition, no member of a national jury could be related in any way to any of the competing acts in such a way that they cannot vote impartially and independently.

Following the release of the full split voting by the EBU after the conclusion of the competition, it was revealed that Austria had placed seventeenth with both the public televote and the jury vote in the first semi-final. In the public vote, Austria scored 15 points, while with the jury vote, Austria scored 27 points.

Below is a breakdown of points awarded to Austria and awarded by Austria in the first semi-final and grand final of the contest. The nation awarded its 12 points to Albania in the semi-final and to Sweden in the final of the contest.

==== Points awarded to Austria ====
Points awarded to Austria (Semi-final 1)
Score	Country
12 points	
10 points	
8 points	
7 points	
6 points	
5 points	Switzerland
4 points	
3 points	
2 points	Belgium
1 point	Iceland

==== Points awarded by Austria ====
Points awarded by Austria (Semi-final 1)
Score	Country
12 points	Albania
10 points	Russia
8 points	Ireland
7 points	Israel
6 points	Moldova
5 points	Romania
4 points	Hungary
3 points	Switzerland
2 points	Iceland
1 point	Greece

Points awarded by Austria (Final)
Score	Country
12 points	Sweden
10 points	Serbia
8 points	Albania
7 points	Bosnia and Herzegovina
6 points	Spain
5 points	Russia
4 points	Germany
3 points	Turkey
2 points	France
1 point	Moldova
