= Nadine Beiler =

Austrian R&B and pop singer

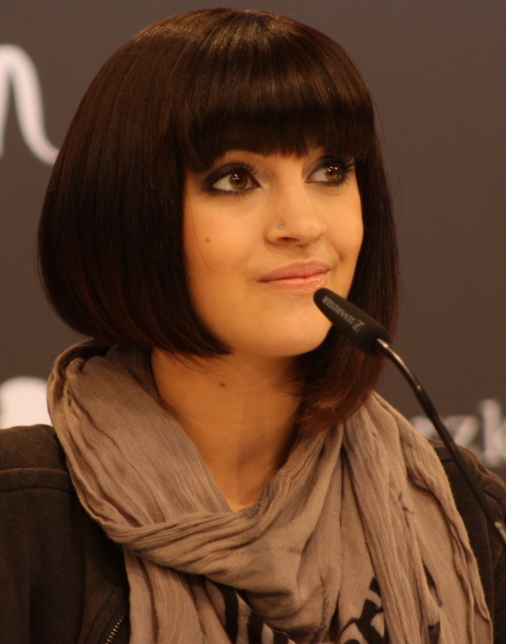
- Beiler in 2011

Background information
- Born: 27 May 1990 (age 36); Inzing, Tyrol, Austria
- Genres: R&B; soul; pop
- Occupation: Singer
- Years active: 2007–present
- Label: Sony Music

Nadine Beiler (born 27 May 1990) is an Austrian R&B and pop singer, who won the third season of the Austrian casting show Starmania in 2007. On 16 February 2007, she released her first single, "Alles was du willst". Currently, Beiler is a professional singer and songwriter based in both Vienna and Tyrol, where she lives in Innsbruck. Beiler represented Austria in the Eurovision Song Contest 2011 with her entry "The Secret Is Love" and came 18th.

== Starmania ==
=== Pre-final casting ===
In the summer of 2006, Beiler attended the first round of castings for the Austrian television show Starmania in the casting event in Tyrol. The quality of her singing was both well received by the jury in the first and second round. In the third pre-final round, she gained a ticket for the main show alongside the female candidate she was competing with. Only 16 years old, she was the youngest of the finalists who made through to the final 18.

=== Songs performed in Starmania ===
In the show, Beiler performed the following songs:

- "Hurt" (Christina Aguilera)
- "Aber bitte mit Sahne" (Udo Jürgens)
- "Where You Lead" (Carole King)
- "Over the Rainbow" (Judy Garland)
- "We've Got Tonight" (Bob Seger & The Silver Bullet Band)
- "Verzaubert" (Papermoon)
- "You Had Me" (Joss Stone)
- "My Number One" (Helena Paparizou)
- "Fallin'" (Alicia Keys)
- "Reflection" (Lea Salonga/Christina Aguilera)
- "Together Again" (Janet Jackson)
- "I'll Be There" (The Jackson 5)
- "Dani California" (Red Hot Chili Peppers)
- "Bridge Over Troubled Water" (Simon and Garfunkel)
- "Don't Let Go (Love)" (En Vogue)

== Winner of Starmania ==
On 26 January 2007, Beiler won the show in the final evening with a high voting approval of 68% of all votes cast (approximately 650,000 votes were cast by mobile phone by viewers of the show).

== Eurovision 2011 ==
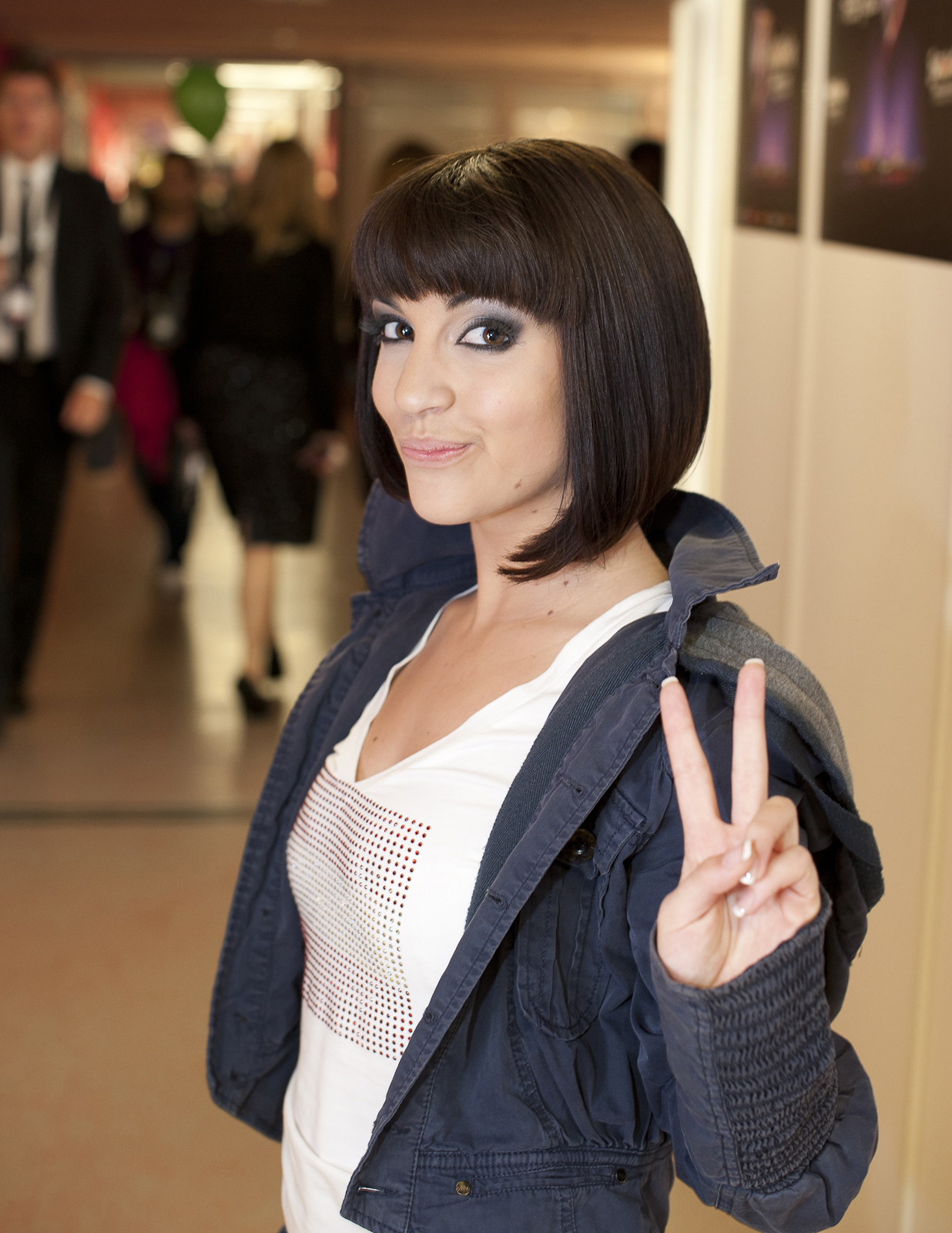
Beiler at Eurovision

On 25 February 2011, Beiler won the Austrian national selection for the Eurovision Song Contest 2011 with her entry "The Secret Is Love", and represented her nation in the second semi-final in Germany. She qualified for the final, in which she ended 18th. In the split jury voting, "The Secret Is Love" ended in 5th place.

== Skyroc Records 2014/2015 ==
Beiler started working on a new project under her new alias 'Dice Mora' with UK/Austrian producer Mac Desi with whom she previously worked with on her album I've Got a Voice on the song "Turn Around". Mac Desi produced 5 songs for her new alias Dice Mora in which the first song "Just Like" was released as a digital download in March 2015, along with a music video which was shot in both California and Austria.

== Discography ==
=== Albums ===
Title	Details	Chart positions
Title	Details	AUT
Komm doch mal rüber	Released: 25 May 2007; Label: Universal Music; Format: Digital download, CD	4
I've Got a Voice	Released: 13 May 2011; Label: Sony Music, Serious Entertainment; Format: Digital download, CD	3
Just Like	Released: Spring 2015; Label: Skyroc Records; Format:Digital download	—
Sweet Artist's Mind	Released: 11 November 2018; Format:Digital download	—
"—" denotes an album that did not chart or was not released.

=== Singles ===
Title	Year	Chart positions	Album
Title	Year	AUT	Album
"Alles was du willst"	2007	2	Komm doch mal rüber
"Was wir sind"	2007	15	Komm doch mal rüber
"The Secret Is Love"	2011	9	I've Got a Voice
"Right On"	2013	—	Non-album single
"Just Like"	2015	—	Just Like
"Let Them Fly" (with Markus Steiner)	2015	—	Non-album singles
"Times Like These"	2016	—	Non-album singles
"Field of Peace (Better Field)" (with Moon51)	2016	—	Non-album singles
"Baby It's You" (with Gilbert)	2016	—	Non-album singles
"—" denotes a single that did not chart or was not released.

Preceded by Eric Papilaya with "Get a Life – Get Alive"	Austria in the Eurovision Song Contest; 2011	Succeeded by Trackshittaz with "Woki mit deim Popo"
