= I've Got a Voice =

Studio album by Nadine Beiler
- Released: May 13, 2011
- Recorded: 2011
- Genre: R&B, hip hop, soul, dance-pop
- Language: English
- Label: Sony Music Entertainment, Serious Entertainment
- Producer: Thomas Rabitsch

Nadine Beiler chronology
Komm doch mal rüber (2007)	I've Got a Voice (2011)

Singles from I've Got a Voice
- 1. "The Secret Is Love" Released: January 3, 2011

I've Got a Voice is the second studio album of the Austrian singer Nadine Beiler, released on May 13, 2011. The first single released from the album "The Secret Is Love" was released on 3 January 2011, it peaked to number 3 on the Austrian Singles Chart.

== Track listing ==
No.	Title	Lyrics	Music	Length
1.	"I Won't Stand in the Waiting Line"	David Lackner, Nadine Beiler	David Lackner, Nadine Beiler	3:46
2.	"Against All Rules"	Elizabeth Lang	Nadine Beiler, Thomas Lang	3:19
3.	"The Secret Is Love"	Nadine Beiler, Thomas Rabitsch	Nadine Beiler, Thomas Rabitsch	3:04
4.	"Never Ever"	Albin Janoska, Nadine Beiler	Albin Janoska, Nadine Beiler	3:38
5.	"You're Always Black and White"	Elizabeth Lang	Nadine Beiler, Thomas Lang	3:46
6.	"Mr. Right Now"	Elizabeth Lang	Nadine Beiler, Thomas Lang	3:15
7.	"I've Got a Voice"	Nadine Beiler	Nadine Beiler, Patrick Schmidinger, Vinzenz Stergin	4:30
8.	"Can I Rely On You"	Albin Janoska, Nadine Beiler	Albin Janoska, Nadine Beiler	3:31
9.	"Keep Up with Me"	Albin Janoska, Nadine Beiler	Albin Janoska, Nadine Beiler	4:21
10.	"You Are the Sun"	Hansi Lang, Thomas Rabitsch, Wolfgang Schlögl	Hansi Lang, Thomas Rabitsch, Wolfgang Schlögl	4:51
11.	"I Wanna Thank You"	David Lackner, Nadine Beiler	David Lackner, Nadine Beiler	5:21
12.	"Night Owls"	Albin Janoska, Nadine Beiler	Albin Janoska, Nadine Beiler	3:33
13.	"Girl or Boy"	Elizabeth Lang	Nadine Beiler, Thomas Lang	3:18
14.	"Turn Around"	Mac Desi	Mac Desi	5:21
15.	"The Secret Is Love" (Dance Remix)	Nadine Beiler, Thomas Rabitsch	Nadine Beiler, Thomas Rabitsch	3:49

== Charts ==
Chart (2011)	Peak position
Austrian Albums Chart	3

== Release history ==
Region	Date	Label	Format
Austria	13 May 2011	Sony Music Entertainment	CD
