= The Slow Club (Austrian group) =

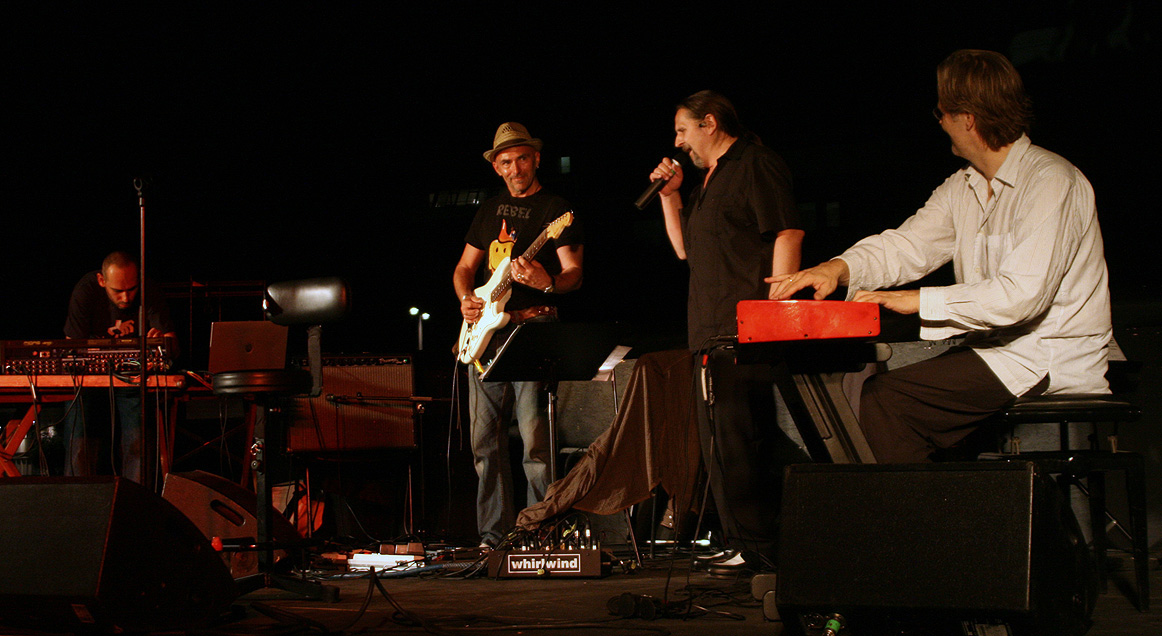
The Slow Club in 2008.

The Slow Club is the name of a music project founded in 2004 by the Austrian musicians Hansi Lang, Thomas Rabitsch and Wolfgang Schlögl.

Their music is influenced by electronic dance music and jazz.

== Discography ==
=== EPs ===
- "Welcome to the Slow Club" (2004)

=== Albums ===
- This Is the Slow Club (2005)
- House of Sleep (2008)
