= Luneau (surname) =

Luneau is a surname. Notable people with the surname include:

- Alexandre Luneau (born 1988), French poker player
- David Luneau (born 1965), American politician from New Hampshire
- Falco De Jong Luneau (born 1984), Austrian-Dutch singer-songwriter
- Jay Luneau (born 1962), American politician from Louisiana
- Joe Luneau, American politician from Vermont
- Michel Luneau (1934–2012), French writer
- Tristan Luneau (born 2004), Canadian ice hockey player
