= Starmania (TV series) =

- Created by: Mischa Zickler
- Starring: Hannes Eder; Arabella Kiesbauer
- Country of origin: Austria
- No. of episodes: 72

Production
- Running time: 120 minutes

Original release
- Network: ORF 1
- Release: 11 November 2002 – 6 May 2022

Starmania is an Austrian casting show/talent show for would-be pop stars. It is broadcast on the Austrian TV channel ORF 1.

Despite striking similarities, Starmania is not a licensed version of the Idols format distributed by FremantleMedia. Attempts to export the format to Germany failed due to legal intervention from Fremantle. In 2004, ORF managed to sell the rights to the Swiss channel SF, where the show is called MusicStar.

From 2003 to 2009, four seasons of Starmania have been aired in Austria.

To date, the winners have been Michael Tschuggnall, Verena Pötzl, Nadine Beiler and Oliver Wimmer. Christina Stürmer, who placed second in the first season, has become more famous than the other winners combined, with top charts positions in Germany, Austria, Switzerland and Italy. Also Conchita Wurst who was known as Thomas Neuwirth at Starmania, has become more famous than the other winners, because she won the Eurovision Song Contest 2014 in Copenhagen.

== Seasons ==
=== Season One (2002–2003) ===
- 1. Michael Tschuggnall (one no. 1 single, one top 40 album)
- 2. Christina Stürmer (five no. 1 singles, three no. 1 albums)
- 3. Boris Uran
- 4. Anita Ritzl
- 5. Livia Hubmann
- 6. Beate Baumgartner
- 7. Andreas Schneider
- 8. Lukas Perman
- 9. Vera Böhnisch
- 10. Thomas Putz
- 11. Elisa Zsivkovits
- 12. Markus Kuen

Starmaniacs-Singles:

- Stars in your eyes
- Tomorrow's Heroes (record single, reached gold-state before it was released)

The first season was the most successful to date. During the final broadcast, 6,000,000 votes were collected.

Michael Tschuggnall was the winner and Christina Stürmer was the runner-up. Two weeks later, they both released their respective debut singles. Stürmer's Ich lebe was much more successful than Tschuggnall's Tears of Happiness. Since then, Stürmer has managed to break into the Swiss and all-important German markets, whereas winner Tschnuggnall's visibility has been quite low.

=== Season Two (2003–2004) ===
- 1. Verena Pötzl (Nr.1 single, Top 5-album)
- 2. Armin Beyer
- 3. Marcel Plieschnegger
- 4. Michael Hoffmann
- 5. Jasmin Schiller
- 6. Magdalena Rentenberger
- 7. Christian Sperrer
- 8. Daniel Kajmakoski
- 9. Angelika Ring
- 10. Luise Gruber
- 11. Rebecca Freidinger
- 12. Patrick Jurdić

Singles:

- Alles und mehr

The second season (dubbed Starmania NG) was not as successful as the first one. The winner was Verena Pötzl, who had only one single in the Austrian Top-40.

Daniel Kajmakoski would later represent Macedonia in the 2015 Eurovision Song Contest.

=== Season Three (2006–2007) ===
- 1. Nadine Beiler
- 2. Thomas "Tom" Neuwirth
- 3. Gernot Pachernigg
- 4. Mario Lang
- 5. Eric Papilaya
- 6. Martin Zerza
- 7. Falco De Jong Luneau
- 8. Birgit Kubica
- 9. Lois Zarculea
- 10. Andreas "Andy" Beck
- 11. Johannes "Johnny" Palmer
- 12. Alexandra Golda

Singles:

- Sing for me

After 2 1/2 years, Starmania returned to the TV screens. Everything was modernised and more professional. The winner was Nadine Beiler, who is a Tyrolian. 1.153 million people watched the final, which is more than the second season, but less than in the first season.

Nadine Beiler's debut single was called Alles was du willst. Also, Mario Lang and the boy band jetzt anders! have already published a single.

Eric Papilaya, Nadine Beiler and Tom Neuwirth would all go on to represent Austria at the Eurovision Song Contest in 2007, 2011 and 2014, respectively.

=== Season Four (2008–2009) ===
- 1. Oliver Wimmer
- 2. Silvia Strasser
- 3. Maria Rerych
- 4. Andreas Pfandler
- 5. Milena Sickinger
- 6. Christian Barboric
- 7. Richard Schlögl
- 8. Evelyn Mair
- 9. Sebastian Mandl
- 10. Christian Dohr ..
- 11. Anna Oberauer
- 12. Sarah Lee

== Discography ==
=== Season One ===
==== Cast as (Starmaniacs/Starmania Allstars) ====
- Stars in Your Eyes
- Tomorrow's Heroes
- Give Peace a Chance

==== Michael Tschuggnall ====
Singles:

- Tears of Happiness (2003)
- Learning how to love you (2003)
- Alles und mehr (2003, ft. Boris Uran & Christina Stürmer)
- Tonight (2005)

Albums:

- Tschuggnall (2003)
- Phönix (2005)

==== Christina Stürmer ====
Singles:

- Ich lebe (2003/2005)
- Geh nicht wenn du kommst (2003)
- Mama Ana Ahabak (2003/2005)
- Vorbei (2004)
- Bus durch London (2004)
- Weißt du wohin wir gehen (2004)
- Liebt sie dich so wie ich (2005)
- Engel fliegen einsam (2005)
- Immer an euch geglaubt (2006)
- Nie genug (2006)
- Um bei dir zu sein (2006)
- Ohne dich (2006)
- Scherbenmeer (2007)

Albums:

- Freier Fall (2003)
- Soll das wirklich alles sein (2004)
- Wirklich Alles! (2005)
- Schwarz Weiss (2005)
- Lebe Lauter (2006)

==== Boris Uran ====
Singles:

- Manchmal (2003)
- Alles und mehr (2003)

Albums:

- Ich (2003)

==== Beate Baumgartner ====
Singles:

- Shosholoza (2003)

==== Lukas Perman ====
Singles:

- When the evening falls (2003)
- These are my rivers (2005)
- 24 Stunden (2005)

Albums:

- Hier im jetzt (2005)

==== Vera Böhnisch ====
Singles:

- Anders (2003)
- Lil' & Addict (2003)
- Sign your name (2004)
- Tonite (2004)
- Dear Ladies (2008)

Albums:

- Get Ur Funk Done (2003)
- Welcome to my record bag (2004)
- Introducing L'Enfant Terrible (2008)

=== Season Two ===
==== Cast (as Starmania NG) ====
- Alles und mehr (Michael Tschuggnall ft. Boris Uran & Christina Stürmer)

==== Verena Pötzl ====
Singles:

- Addiction (2004)
- Daddy leave Mummy alone (2004)
- La Ola (2005)
- Live Olympic (2006)

Albums:

- Taken Unaware (2004)

==== Patrick Jurdić ====
Singles

- Pull Me Out From Inside (2006)
- Moj Broj (2006)
- Samo Reci Da (2006)

Albums

- Reci Da Si Za (2006)

=== Season Three ===
==== Cast (as Starmaniacs) ====
- Sing for me

==== Nadine Beiler ====
Singles:

- Alles was du willst
- Was wir sind
- The Secret Is Love

Albums:

- Komm doch mal rüber

==== Jetzt anders! (Tom Neuwirth, Martin Zerza, Falco De Jong Luneau & Johnny Palmer) ====
Singles:

- Dieser Moment
- Immer und Ewig

Albums:

- Gut So

==== Tom Neuwirth (as Conchita Wurst) ====
Singles:

- Unbreakable
- That's What I Am
- Rise Like a Phoenix

==== Gernot Pachernigg ====
Singles:

- Neue Helden

==== Eric Papilaya ====
Singles:

- Get A Life - Get Alive
