= Thomas Rabitsch =

Austrian keyboardist and record producer (born 1956)

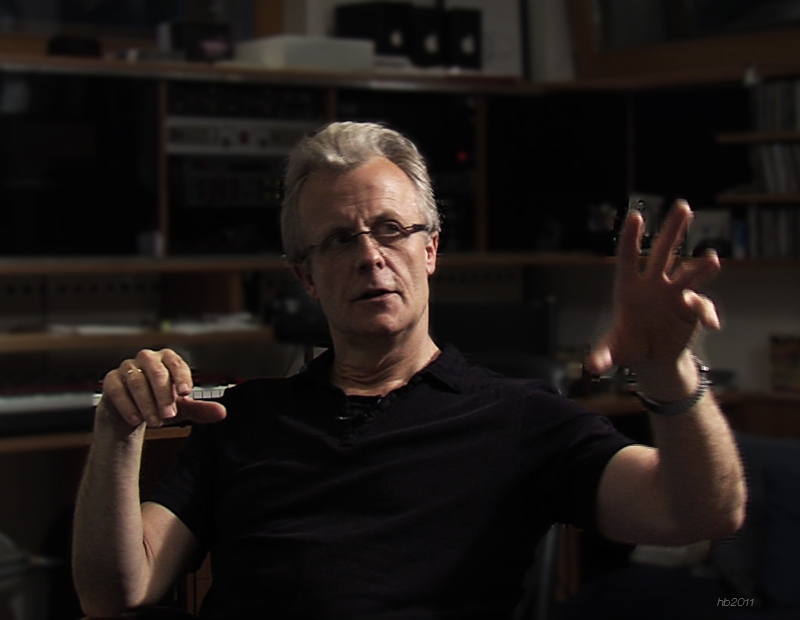
Rabitsch in 2011

Thomas Rabitsch (born 19 November 1956 in Vienna) is an Austrian keyboardist and record producer.

== Projects ==
=== Musical projects ===
- 1980: Off the bone, Harri Stojka
- 1981: Psychoterror, Drahdiwaberl
- 1982: Keine Angst, Hansi Lang
- 1982: Ohne Ausweg, Der eiserne Vorhang
- 1982: Tight, Harri Stojka
- 1982: Mc Ronalds Massaker, Drahdiwaberl
- 1983: Werwolfromantik, Drahdiwaberl
- 1983: Wer hat hier pfui geschrien, Drahdiwaberl
- 1983: DÖF (als Koproduzent), DÖF
- 1985: Ich oder Du, Hansi Lang
- 1985: Jeannys Rache, Drahdiwaberl
- 1990: Reif für den Pepi, Drahdiwaberl
- 1990: Swound Vibes, The Moreaus
- 1992: Ärger als Deix, Heli Deinboek
- 1993: Der Puls, Heli Deinboek
- 1994: So war's, i schwör's, Heli Deinboek
- 1994: Sperminator, Drahdiwaberl
- 1996: Die letzte Ölung, Drahdiwaberl
- 1996: Deinboek singt Newman, Heli Deinboek
- 1997: Spiele Leben – live, Hansi Lang
- 1999: Verdammt wir leben noch, Falco
- 2000: Torte statt Worte (als Mitproduzent), Drahdiwaberl
- 2001: Prinzessin (Single), Max Schmiedl
- 2001: Liebeslaube (Single), Max Schmiedl
- 2001: 1-13 (Single), Max Schmiedl
- 2001: Neue Heim.at, Various
- 2004: L.I.V.E. Donauinsel, Falco
- 2004: Welcome To The Slow Club, The Slow Club
- 2005: This Is The Slow Club, The Slow Club
- 2008: Symphonic, Falco
- 2008: Donauinsel Live (Re-Release), Falco
- 2008: "House Of Sleep", The Slow Club
- 2011: "The Secret Is Love", Nadine Beiler
- 2025: Sing Hansi! Lieder aus dem Gemeindebau, Hansi Lang, post-humously published songs

=== Further Productions ===
- ????: Produzent von A.D.
- ????: Wir wollen Alles und mehr, Starmania (Producer)
- ????: Atme tief durch, Vera Böhnisch (Producer)
- 1998: Remixes der Band Keilerkopf
- 2000: F@lco – A Cyber Show (Musical) (Producer of the CD)
- 2000: Remixes of the band Heinz aus Wien
- 2001: Diverse Produktionen for Afrodelics
- 2002: Sprechen Sie Österreichisch? (Producer)
- 2002: Das schaurig schönste Ding der Welt (Producer)
- 2002: Stars in Your Eyes (Single), Starmania (co-producer)
- 2003: Tomorrow's Heroes (Single), Starmaniacs (Producer)
- 2003: Just A Little Love For Christmas (Titel), Starmania NG
- 2004: Starshine (Titel), Starmania NG (Producer)
- 2004: My Bonnie Is Over The Ocean (Kinderlieder-CD) (Producer)
- 2005: Deine Hilfe wird gebraucht, Austria for Asia (Producer)
- Executive Producer/Co-Producer of further Starmania CDs
- Producer of Engel, Stern und Schlittenfahrt, Die schönsten Kinderlieder, Advent & Weihnacht in Österreich

=== Music for theatre ===
- Saitensprung
- F@lco – A Cyber Show (musical director) Ronacher, Vienna, 1 April 2000 (Regie: Paulus Manker, with participation of André Eisermann, Hansi Lang, Roman Gregory, Georgij Makazaria)
- Alpenkönig und Menschenfreund (Music for the programme of Austrofred)
- Elvis & John, Winterreise, Romeo & Julia, Dschungelbuch, Das weite Land, Blutsbrüder, Broadway-Melodie 1492, Mundo Loco (1982), Fröhliche X-mas, Nazis im Weltraum, Na Sowas, Klanggarten (1983) (space installation, music)

=== Film score ===
- Sisters of reality
- Bernhardiner & Katz
- Aktion C+M+B
- Vienna
- Spirello
- Falco – Verdammt, wir leben noch!
- Polly Adler

== Awards ==
- 2005: Amadeus Austrian Music Award for Live Donauinsel + Stadthalle Wien in the category "Musik-DVD des Jahres"
- 2006: Amadeus Austrian Music Award for This Is The Slow Club in the category "Jazz/Blues/Folk-Album des Jahres national" with The Slow Club
