= Starmania =

Starmania may refer to:

- Starmania (musical), a French/Québécois rock opera, 1976
- Starmania (TV series), an Austrian TV series
