= Face the Day =

Face the Day may refer to:

- Face the Day (album), an album by 24-7 Spyz
- "Face the Day" (Natália Kelly song)
- "Face the Day" (The Angels song)
