= Alles was du willst =

Single by Nadine Beiler

from the album Komm doch mal rüber
- Released: February 16, 2007 (Austria)
- Genre: Pop, R&B
- Length: 3:23
- Label: Universal Music
- Producer(s): Alexander Kahr

Nadine Beiler singles chronology
"Alles was du willst" (2007)	"Was wir sind" (2007)

"Alles was du willst" is the debut single by Austrian singer Nadine Beiler.

It was recorded within one week and was produced by Alexander Kahr (Christina Stürmer, Luttenberger*Klug,...). Premiere date was February 2, 2007 (Austria) and it was released on February 16 . The song was written in October 2006, a short time before the third season of Starmania aired. Next to this song, three other ones were written, because, the winner of the casting show, should choose one.

== Chart performance ==
The single peaked Nr. 2 in Austria. It was the worst entry for a Starmania winner, because everyone except her had entered the charts at number one. Moreover, the reviews were very bad, many critics said, that her voice is not audible and, that this single doesn't sound like R&B. After a week it was pushed down on the 5th place in the Austria Top 75.

== Track listing ==
CD-Single
No.	Title	Length
1.	"Alles was du willst" (Radio Version)	3:27
2.	"Alles was du willst" (Karaoke Version)	3:27

== Charts ==
Chart (2007)	Peak position
Austria (Ö3 Austria Top 40)	2
Austrian Black/R&B charts	1
