= Beate Baumgartner =

Austrian-Namibian musical artist

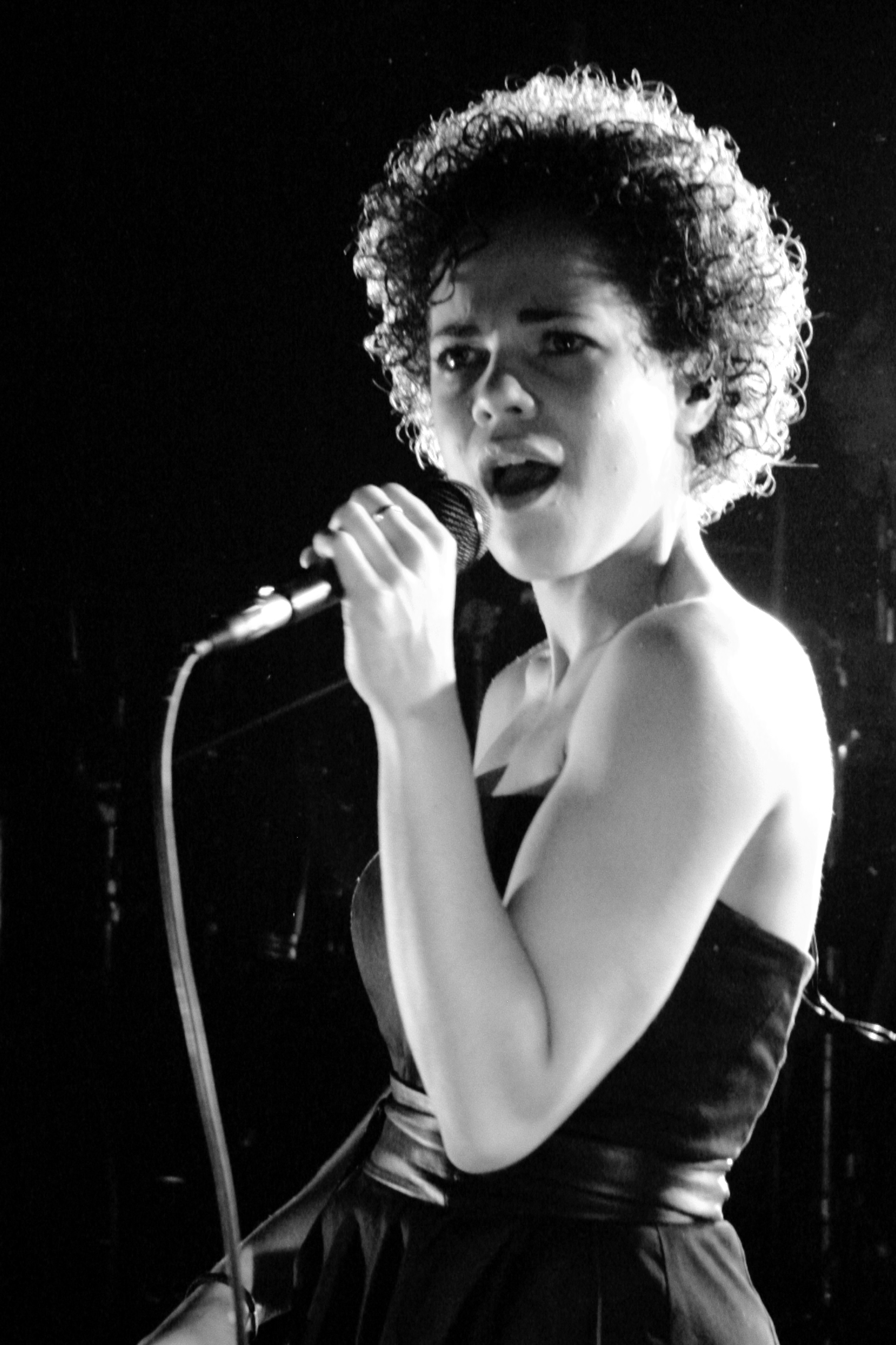
- Beate Baumgartner performing in 2009

Background information
- Birth name: Beate Baumgartner
- Born: 9 May 1983 (age 42) Windhoek, South West Africa
- Genres: Austropop
- Occupation: Singer
- Instrument: Vocals
- Years active: 2002–present

Beate Baumgartner (born 9 May 1983), also known as "Yola B", is an Austrian-Namibian singer.

She was born in Windhoek, South-West Africa (now Namibia), and gained her initial fame by participating in the talent show Starmania in 2002–3. She subsequently joined Parov Stelar's electro-swing band, which formed in 2005. From 2008 to 2009 she sang with another electro-rock Band, Monilla, and is featured on their 2008 album, Hello World – Chapter 1. In 2015 she joined Romany band DelaDap.

The daughter of an Austrian father and a Namibian mother, she attended the German Higher Private School Windhoek, where she began acting and singing. Her mother is the actress Mara Baumgartner, who starred in the prize-winning 2015 film Katutura.

After relocating to Graz, Austria, as a teenager, she worked for Greenpeace and the World Wide Fund for Nature, and passed up on the opportunity to attend university in order to further her singing career. Having finished sixth in Starmania, she was featured on the 2003 album Starmania: Best of Duets, distributed by Universal, performing the track "Something Stupid", with Michael Tschuggnall.

== Discography ==
Albums

- 2008: Hello World – Chapter 1 (with Monilla)

Collaborations

- 2009: Coco (Parov Stelar Band), on the track "Dandy"
- 2009: Midnight Rendezvous (Mike Rigler EP), on the track "Heroes (feat. Yola B)"
- 2014: Listen up (DelaDap)

Singles

- 2003: Shosholoza
- 2008: Monilla: 2nd Life
- 2014: "Skyrocket" (with DelaDap)
