= Jetzt Anders! =

Austrian Band

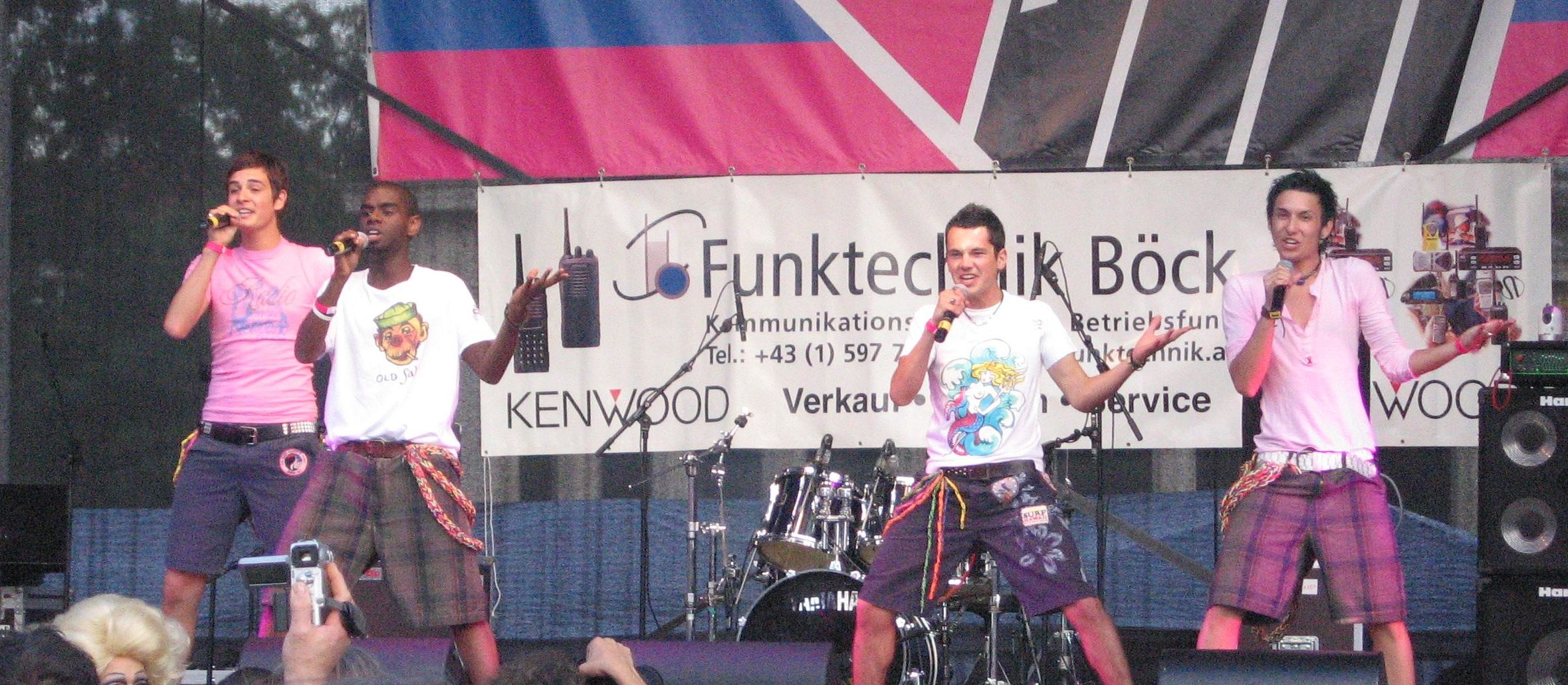

Background information
- Also known as: Jetzt!
- Origin: Austria
- Genres: Schlager; pop; rock
- Years active: 2007
- Label: Universal Music
- Past members: Falco De Jong Luneau; Tom Neuwirth; Johnny Palmer; Martin Zerza

Jetzt Anders! ("Different Now!") was an Austrian boy band active in 2007. Started by singer Tom Neuwirth following his second-place finish on the casting show Starmania, the band was together for only eight months. Their music style is a mix of soul, pop and rock. They wanted to call the band Jetzt! ("Now!"), but there were already two other bands in Austria with that name, so they called the band Jetzt Anders! .

Neuwirth went on to win the Eurovision Song Contest 2014 as his drag persona Conchita Wurst. According to Neuwirth, the highlight of Jetzt Anders! was when the band performed at a birthday party for Paris Hilton.

== Members ==
- Falco De Jong Luneau
- Thomas "Tom" Neuwirth
- Johannes "Johnny" Palmer
- Martin Zerza

== Discography ==
=== Singles ===
- Dieser Moment (single, 2007)

Name	Chart (2007)	Peak position
Dieser Moment	Austrian Top 75	7
Immer und ewig	Austrian Top 75	32

=== Albums ===
- Gut So (album, 2007)
