= Mario Lang =

Austrian rock-singer (born 1988)

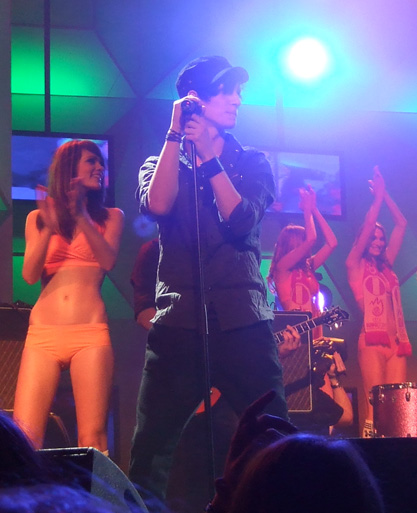
- Mario Lang at a photo shooting

Background information
- Also known as: Die Rotzpipn
- Born: Mario Lang; 22 December 1988 (age 37)
- Origin: Bruck an der Mur, Styria, Austria
- Genre: Rock
- Occupation: Singer
- Years active: 2007–present (singer)
- Labels: Universal Music (2007–present)

Mario Lang (born 22 December 1988 in Bruck a. d. Mur, Styria) is an Austrian rock-singer.

He reached the fourth place in the third season of the Austrian casting show Starmania.

== Biography ==
Mario grew up in St. Lorenzen in Styria and visited school in Kapfenberg until he became a Starmaniac. Before he had had vocal education for two years (pop-musical).

In summer 2006 he went to the pre-castings of Starmania, where he overcame every round and reached the final of the best 12.

In the Austrian media there were many rumors, that it was planned by the Austrian television, that he should win, but in the episode from 19 January 2007 he failed and didn't reach the big final of the casting show.

After Starmania Lang signed a contract with the producer Alexander Kahr, who had worked with Christina Stürmer and Luttenberger*Klug before.

== Discography ==
=== Singles ===
Release	Name	Austria
23 March 2007	Dein Weg	3
29 June 2007	Du Bist Soviel	29
9 November 2007	Bitte Reich Mir Deine Hand	36
18 April 2008	Bring Ihn Heim	2

=== Albums ===
- (2007): Mein Weg (My Way)
