= Gernot Pachernigg =

Austrian singer (born 1981)

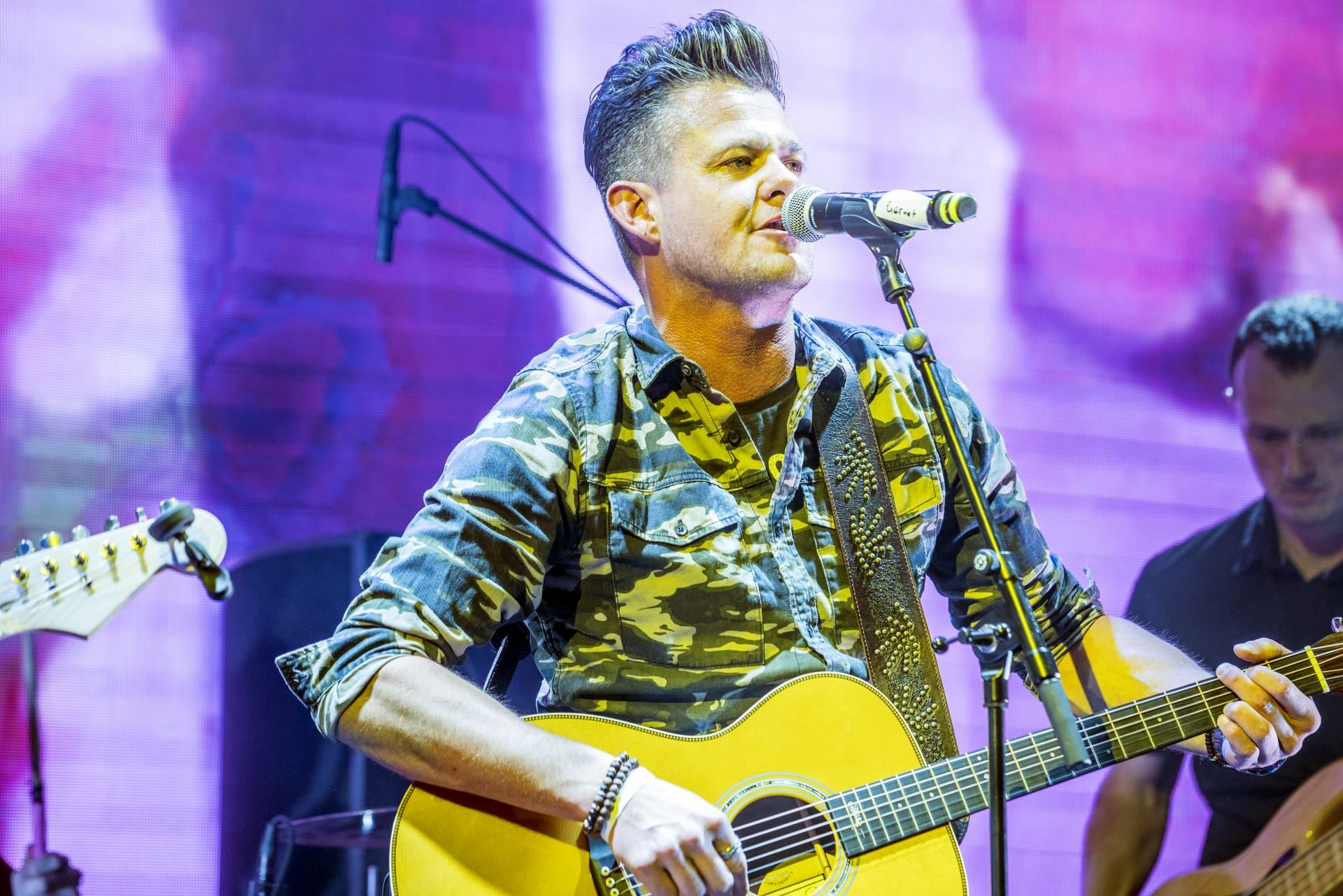
Gernot Pachernigg Dom im Berg

Gernot "Notty" Pachernigg (born 14 June 1981 in Graz, Styria) is an Austrian songwriter, pop singer, entertainer and actor. He became known for his participation in the third season of the talent show Starmania, which was broadcast on ORF television between October 2006 and January 2007.

== Biography ==
Pachernigg grew up on a farm in Laßnitzhöhe, where he also attended secondary school. After completing the compulsory school years at the polytechnic school in Sankt Marein near Graz, he trained as an electrician at the Pichler-Werke and completed his military service afterwards. He then continued to work for various electrical companies.

== Musical career ==
Pachernigg's musical career began in 2000. With two friends, he founded the band Graz, for which he also wrote songs in the Austropop style. In the summer of 2006, he went to the casting for the third season of Starmania. After several qualifying rounds, he reached the Final of the Top Three. In the final show, on 26 January 2007, he finally took third place. After Starmania he was signed by the Universal Company. Together with Alexander Kahr, he produced his debut single Neue Helden, which made it into the top 20 of the Austrian charts at the end of March 2007. Following this success, Pachernigg teamed up with music producer Erich Buchebner to work on his first album. The project was also supported by EAV mastermind Thomas Spitzer. In July 2007, Pachernigg went on tour with Rainhard Fendrich through Germany and Austria.

Gernot Pachernigg's single Neue Helden was nationally nominated for the Amadeus Austrian Music Award 2008 in the category Newcomer of the Year.

His debut album was released on 27 June 2008 and is called Es warat an der Zeit. Before that, on May 30, the second single Arrivederci from the debut album was released. Since then, Pachernigg has been working without a record label. In 2009, the first productions with Robby Musenbichler followed in Graz. The collaboration resulted in the first self-written songs (single: Love is in the Air oder Bitte geh net weg). In 2011, work on his fifth studio album “Time to Enjoy” began. It was published in March 2017. For the first time, Pachernigg was also active as a producer. The first single to be taken from this album was Bis ans Ende der Welt, the second one Tag und Nacht.

In 2018, Pachernigg founded the band "About Kings" in Las Vegas, Nevada, together with the tattoo artist Mario Barth. With the first mutual single "Easy Rider" they surpassed the two million mark in hits on YouTube. In spring 2019, work on their first album began in Nashville. For this, they collaborated with Kent Wells, the producer of country icon Dolly Parton. In April, the album was recorded in the Dark Horse Recording Studios in four weeks. Immediately afterwards, About Kings played as a support act on Andreas Gabalier's stadium tour in Germany, Austria and Switzerland in front of more than 500,000 visitors. They were again accompanied by Kent Wells. During this summer tour, the first album “About Kings are Here in Town” was released with a show at the Grazer Kasematten. In autumn, About Kings released the first songs from it: "Gott sei dank", "Alkoholproblem" and "I Denk an di". They achieved considerable airplay on various radio stations. Another album is planned in Nashville for 2021.

== Radio and TV career ==
In May 2007 and March 2008, Pachernigg made an appearance in the ORF series Oben ohne von Reinhard Schwabenitzky. Between April 2008 and the beginning of June 2008, he took part in the ORF TV show Das Match along 19 other celebrities. After taking private acting and guitar lessons, Pachernigg was offered the opportunity to host a program on the private radio station RADIO GRAZ 94.2 in December 2007, which was still new at the time. He was obliged to moderate the program Gut aufgelegt every other week. The contract expired at the end of 2008. Until December 2010, Pachernigg worked as a presenter for the Austrian radio station Antenne Wien. From January 2011 to February 2017, he worked as editor and presenter for the most successful private radio in Austria, Antenne Steiermark. From January to March 2010, Gernot Pachernigg and seven other Austrian stars took part in the celebrity special of the ATV entertainment program Österreich isst besser.

In 2017, Pachernigg founded a marketing and PR agency. He specializes in developing social media strategies and online advertising for various companies. He also develops commercials and strategies for young entrepreneurs. Occasionally, he is booked as a presenter and entertainer for large company events and works as a composer and songwriter.

== Starmania ==
1. "I Get a Kick out of You" (Ethel Merman)
2. "Adesso tu" (Eros Ramazzotti)
3. "Livin' la vida loca" (Ricky Martin)
4. "Home" (Michael Bublé)
5. "Dancing in the Street"
6. "Rock DJ" (Robbie Williams)
7. "Don't Let the Sun Go Down on Me"
8. "Kiss" (Prince & the Revolution)
9. "Can't Wait Until Tonight" (Max Mutzke)
10. "I'm Still Standing" (Elton John)
11. "With a Little Help from My Friends" (The Beatles/Joe Cocker)
12. "Vienna Calling" (Falco)
13. "Easy" (The Commodores)
14. "You Can Leave Your Hat On" (Joe Cocker)
15. "I hea di klopfn" (Kurt Ostbahn)
16. "Have I Told You Lately" (Van Morrison)

== Discography ==
=== Albums ===
- Graz bei Nacht (2003)
- Graz Live (2005)
- Graz 0316 (2006)
- Es warat an der Zeit (2008)
- Zeit Zum Genießen (2017)
- About Kings Are Here in Town (2019)

=== Singles ===
- Neue Helden (2007)
- Arrivederci (2008)
- Spürn (2009)
- Sk Sturm Fansong (2010)
- Bitte geh net weg (2012)
- Bis ans Ende der Welt (2017)
- Tag und Nacht (2018)
- Vorstadtweiber (2019)
- I denk an di (2019)
- Alkoholproblem (2019)
- Gott sei Dank (2019)
- Weikhard Uhr (2021)

| Name | Chart (2007) | Peak position |
|---|---|---|
| Neue Helden | Austrian Top 75 | 13 |
