= DelaDap =

Austrian electro swing band

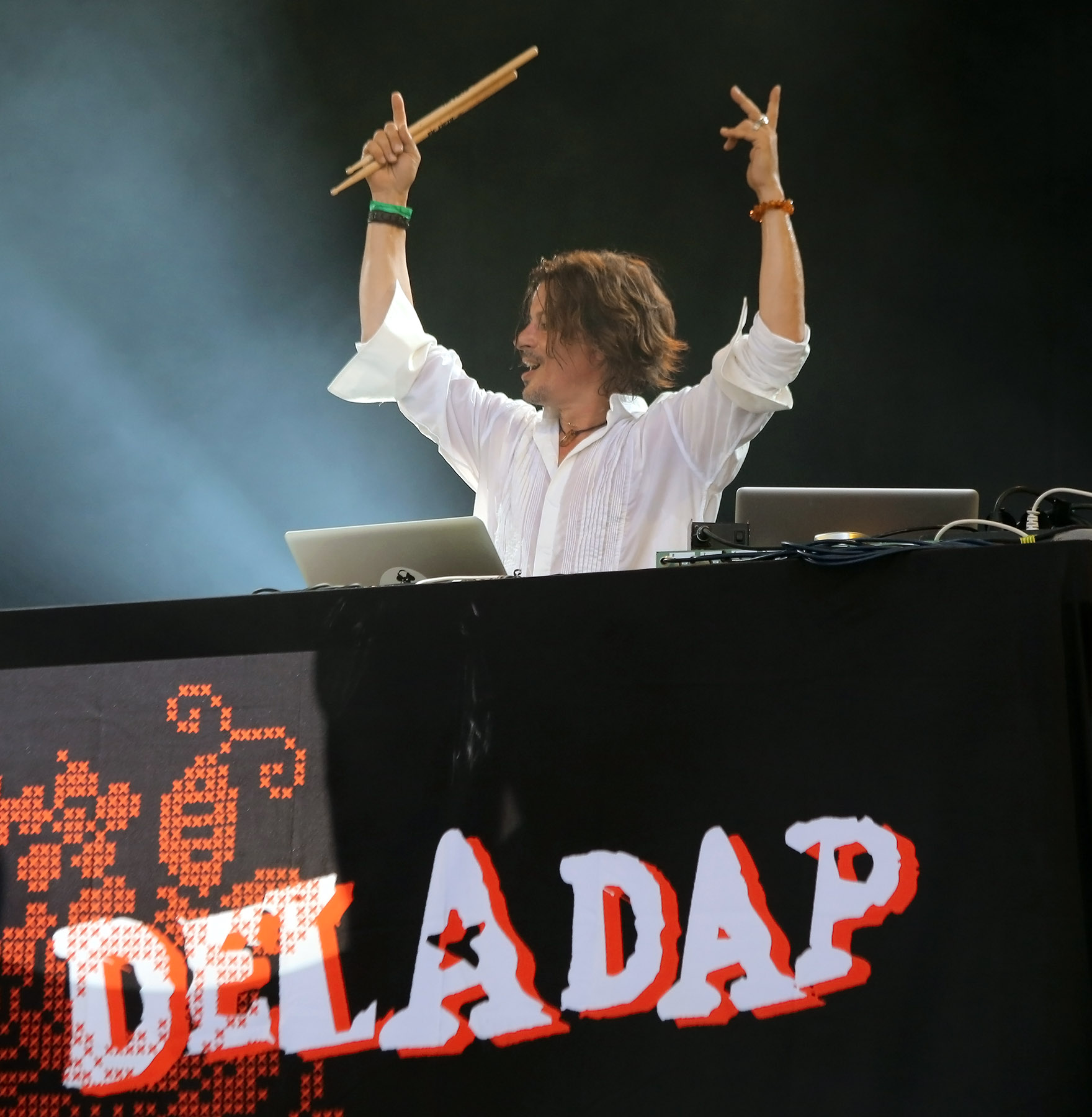
- Stani Vana (2013)

Background information
- Origin: Vienna, Austria
- Genres: Electro swing; EDM; pop
- Years active: 2004–present
- Label: Chat Chapeau
- Members: DJ Stani Vana (turntables, 2004-present); Yola B (vocals, 2014-present); Aleksander Stoijc (guitar); Alen Dzambic (accordion); Jovan Torbica (double-bass); Kristina Gunarova (vocals); Simona Senkiova (vocals)
- Past members: Melinda Stoika (2004-2013) Tania Saedi (2013-2014)
- Website: deladap.com

DelaDap (also known as !DelaDap and !deladap; stylized as DELADAP) is an Austrian electro swing, pop, and EDM band belonging to Stani Vana. Initially, Vana worked with international musicians from the Czech Republic, Serbia, Bosnia, Herzegovina, and Russia; the idea was to combine Roma music with jazz, electronic music, and pop music.

== History ==
The band was founded in 2004 by Stani Vana, in Vienna. The name "DelaDap" comes from Romani, and translates to "give me the beat" or "give me the rhythm". Their music is influenced by the Balkans. Their second album, Dela Paji, was released in 2006, with various guest musicians from Central and Eastern Europe contributing their individual styles. Czech-born saxophonist and producer Philip Noha from Cologne edited the Slavic traditional "Goldregen" together with Stani Vana.

In 2012, DelaDap, now with singer Melinda Stoika, was accepted into the Austrian national preliminary rounds for the Eurovision Song Contest in Baku, with the song Crazy Swing. When a cell phone video of a DJ set showed the song played before the claimed earliest release date of 2011, the track was disqualified. They re-entered the competition with the song Don't Turn Around. DelaDap also applied to represent Austria in 2022.

In the same year, the single Don't Turn Around was number 67 in the Austrian charts. The album I Know What You Want peaked at 42, and in 2014, the album This is Deladap was ranked 41.

DelaDap's fourth album I Know What You Want was nominated for the Austrian Amadeus Awards in 2012 and 2013.

In 2014, for the song Listen Up, musicians from the Austrian music club Erla collaborated with DelaDap. Melinda Stoika was the singer for the band until 2013, when the Viennese singer Tania Saedi became the successor to Stoika until 2014. Yola B was henceforth the singer.

In 2022, the album Play was released in Japan, with new versions of the songs in Japanese.

=== Genre ===
The band started off being inspired by Balkan music, and the music has been described as "gypsy" in style. DelaDap gradually moved away from the Balkan genre, and by 2016 had left it. They now play in the swing and EDM genres. Stani Vana explained the shift as the Balkan genre being too taxing on the band.

== Gallery ==
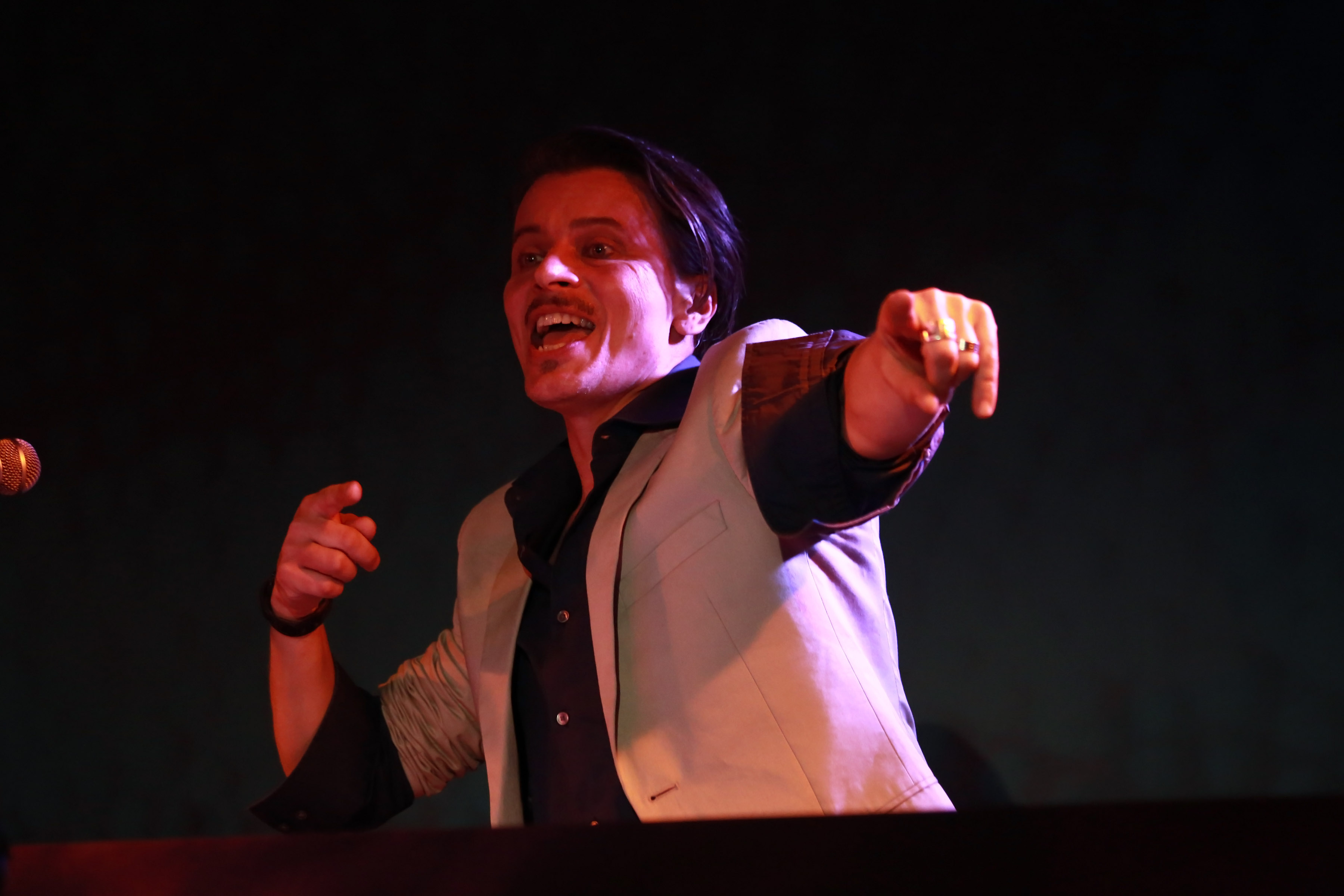
Stani Vana

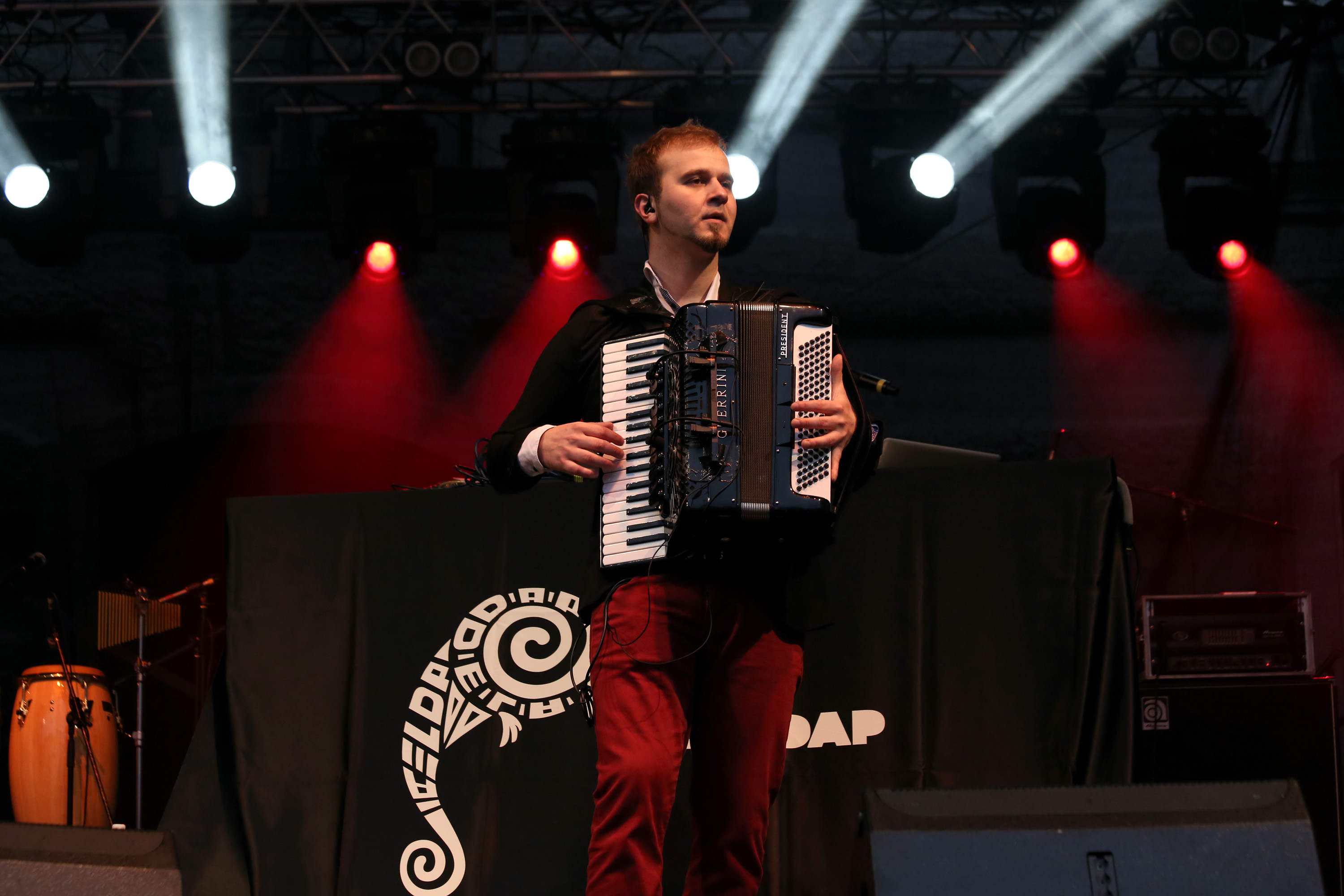
Alen Dzambic

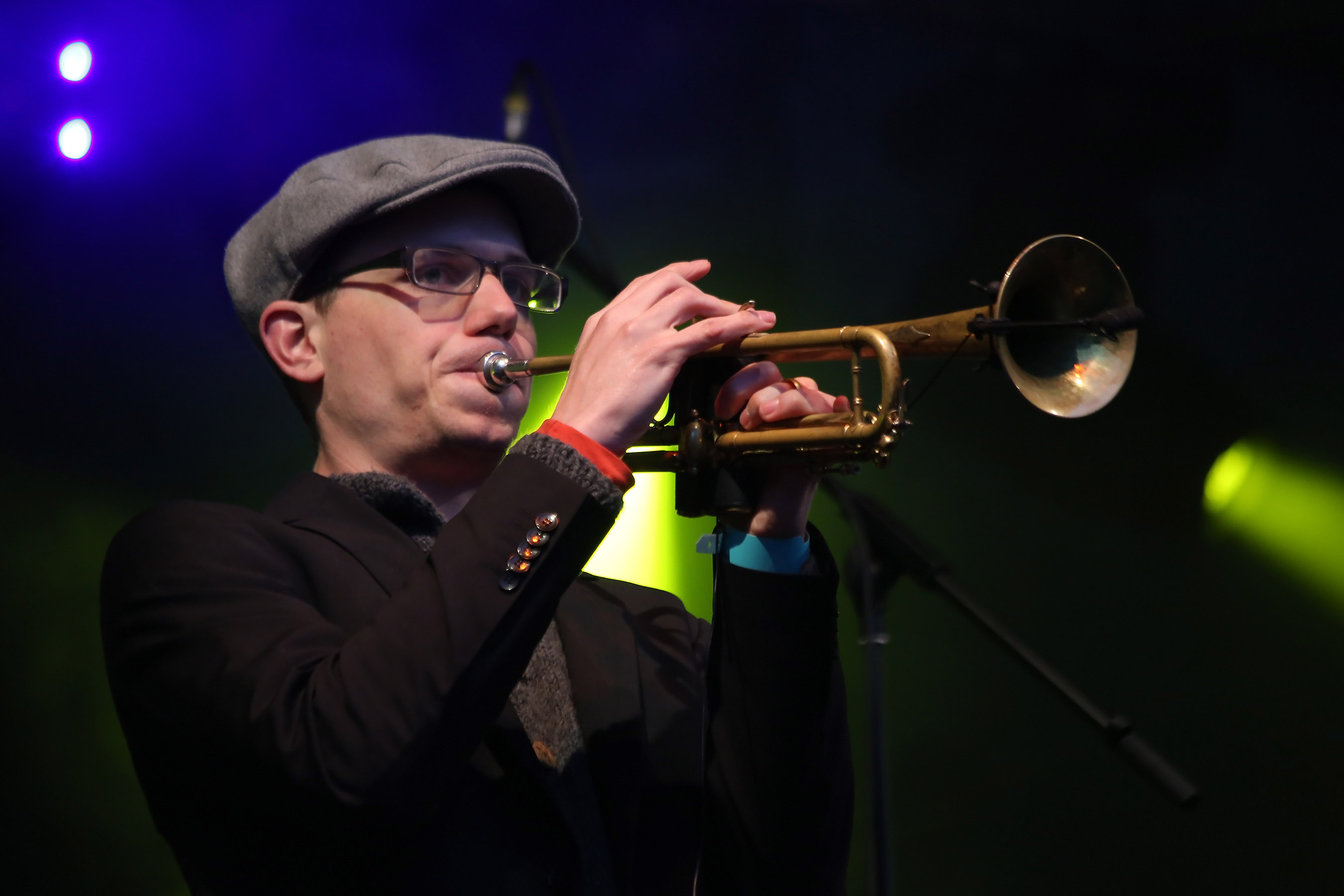
Christof Zellhofer

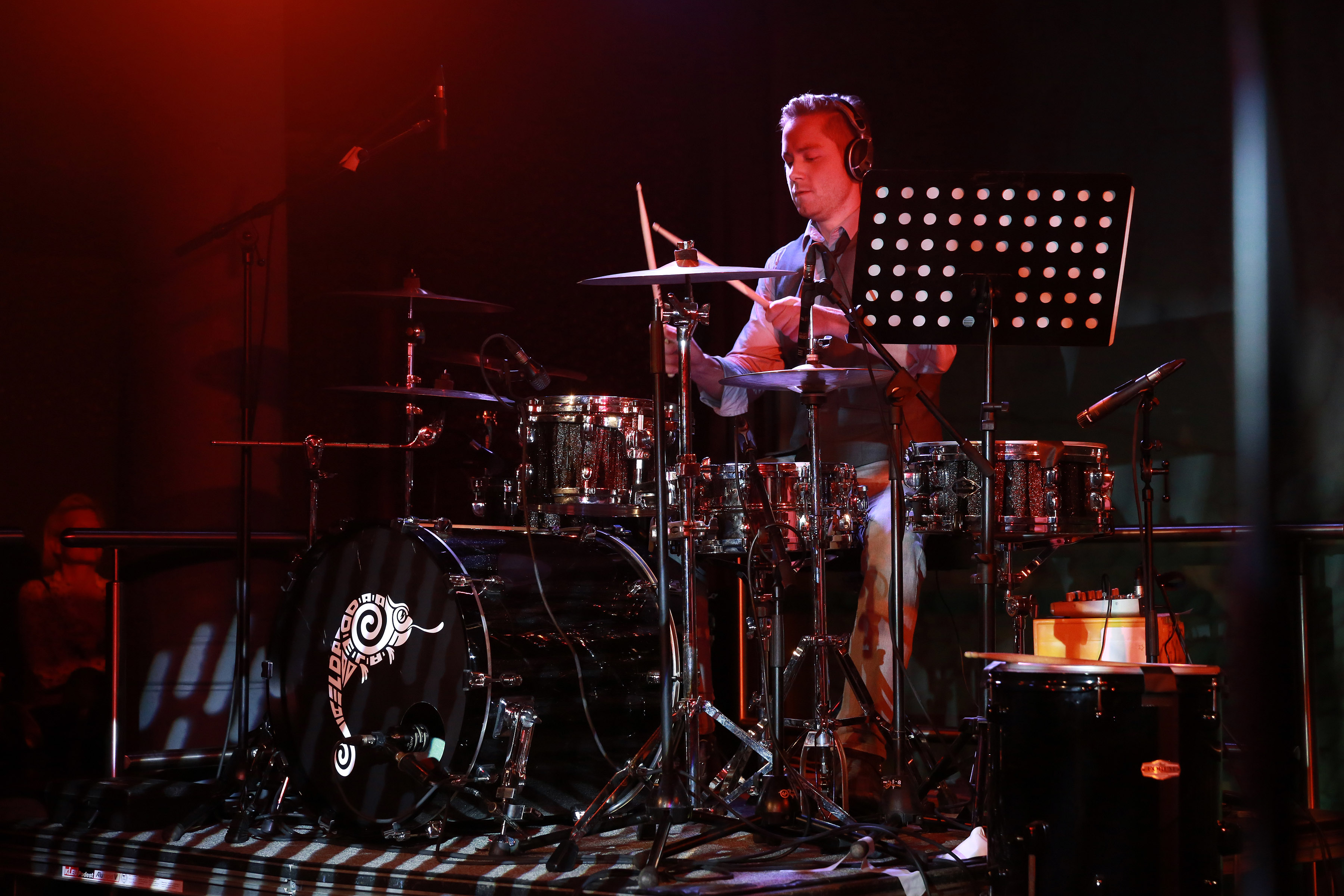
Mathias Auinger

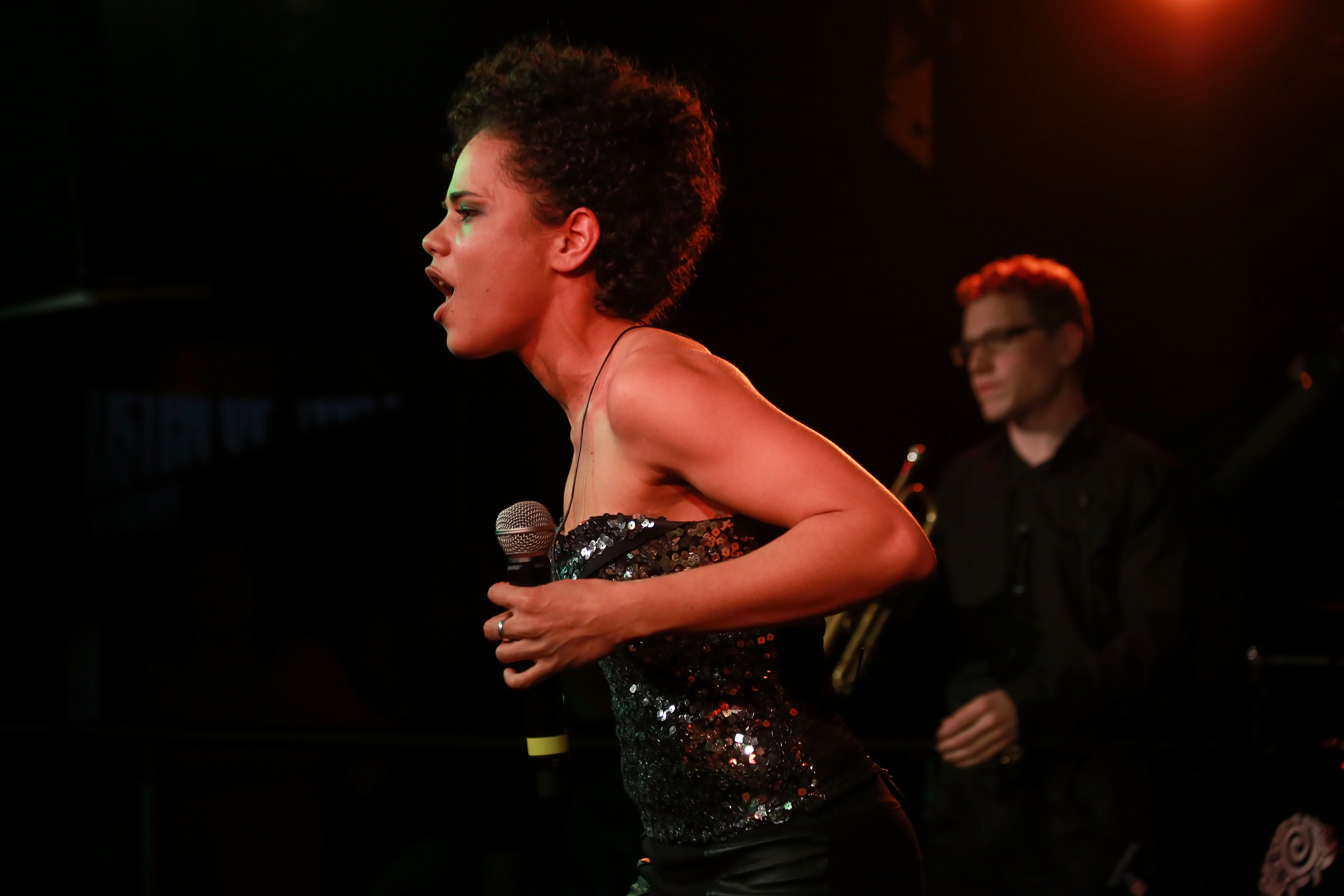
Yola B

== Discography ==
=== Albums ===
- 2004: Cigani Ruzsa + Angelo (CD, LP, ecco.chamber/Chat Chapeau)
- 2006: Dela Paji (CD, CD+DVD-limited edition, Chat Chapeau)
- 2008: Sara La Kali (CD, Chat Chapeau)
- 2012: I Know What You Want (CD, Chat Chapeau Nouveau)
- 2013: Made in Mexico (CD, Chat Chapeau Nouveau)
- 2014: This Is !Deladap (CD, Chat Chapeau Nouveau)
- 2016: Bring It On (CD, Chat Chapeau Nouveau)
- 2017: Rejazzed – Bring It On (CD, Chat Chapeau Nouveau)
- 2021: Play (12-Vinyl, Chat Chapeau Nouveau)
- 2022: Shake It Up (Chat Chapeau Nouveau)

=== Maxi-Singles ===
- 2003: Amaro Shavo (Maxi-CD, 12 in (30 cm) vinyl, ecco.chamber)
- 2003: Amaro Shavo Remixed (12 in (30 cm) vinyl, ecco.chamber)
- 2004: Angelo (Maxi-CD, 12 in. vinyl, ecco.chamber)
- 2005: Jeg Tan + Zsa Manca (Maxi-CD, 12 in (30 cm) vinyl, Chat Chapeau)
- 2006: Dela Paji (Maxi-CD, 12 in (30 cm) vinyl, chat chapeau)
- 2006: Lautlos feat. voice & musicians of the 17 Hippies (Maxi-CD, 12 in (30 cm) vinyl, Chat Chapeau)
- 2008: Lisa Lisa (Maxi-CD, Chat Chapeau)
- 2008: Kaj tu Salas (Maxi-CD, Chat Chapeau)
- 2014: Cash and Chaos (DL-CD, Chat Chapeau)
- 2014: Listen Up featuring Yola B. (DL-CD, Chat Chapeau)
- 2015: Skyrocket (DL-CD, Chat Chapeau)
- 2021: Gambling Girl (CD, Chat Chapeau Nouveau)
- 2022: Something Serious (Chat Chapeau Nouveau)
