= Komm doch mal rüber =

Studio album by Nadine
- Released: May 25, 2007
- Recorded: February 2007
- Genre: Pop, R&B
- Language: German
- Label: Universal Music
- Producer: Alexander Kahr

Nadine chronology
Komm doch mal rüber (2007)	I've Got a Voice (2011)

Singles from Komm doch mal rüber
- 1. "Alles was du willst" Released: February 16, 2007; 2. "Was wir sind" Released: May 4, 2007

Komm doch mal rüber was Austrian singer Nadine's debut album, released on May 25, 2007. The album peaked to number 4 on the Austrian Albums Chart.

== Music style ==
The sound of the songs varies throughout the entire album, although all songs are in German. The first single of the album was "Alles was du willst" and the 2nd single from the album was "Was wir sind".

Her songs are very emotional and rather slow, though there are some Hip hop and Contemporary R&B songs, influenced by some of her favorite interpreters like Mariah Carey, Céline Dion and Beyoncé.

== Singles ==
- "Alles was du willst" was the first single released from the album. It was released on February 16, 2007. The single peaked to number 2 on the Austrian Singles Chart.
- "Was wir sind" was the second and final single from the album. It was released on May 4, 2007. The single peaked to number 15 on the Austrian Singles Chart.

== Track listing ==
No.	Title	Length
1.	"Ich Will Dich" ("I Want You")	3:55
2.	"Um Die Welt" ("Around the World")	3:59
3.	"Wie Ein Bild" ("Like a Picture")	3:42
4.	"Zeig Mir Wie's Geht" ("Show Me How It's Going")	4:28
5.	"Was wir sind" ("What We Are")	3:22
6.	"Sag Meinen Namen" ("Say My Name")	2:59
7.	"Komm Doch Mal Rüber" ("Come On Over")	4:05
8.	"Zählt Nicht" ("Doesn't Count")	3:05
9.	"Erste Nacht" ("First Night")	4:02
10.	"Alles was du willst" ("Everything You Want")	3:27
11.	"Meer Sehen" ("See the Sea")	3:10
12.	"Nua Do" ("Only Here")	3:10

== Charts ==
Chart (2007)	Peak position
Austrian Albums Chart	4
