= Trackshittaz =

Disbanded Austrian rap duo

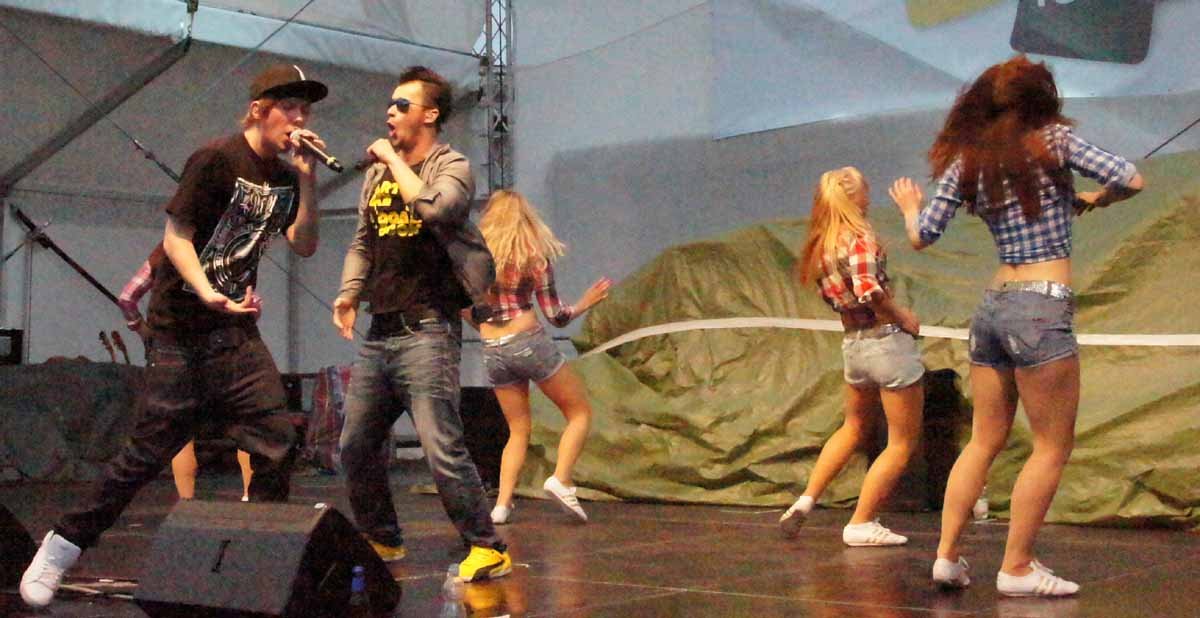
- 'Waggle Your Ass' - Vienna, 2012-05-05

Background information
- Origin: Mühlviertel, Austria
- Genre: Hip hop
- Years active: 2010–2015
- Label: Sony Music
- Members: Lukas Plöchl; Manuel Hoffelner
- Website: www.trackshittaz.at

Trackshittaz were an Austrian hip-hop band from Mühlviertel, made up of Lukas Plöchl (a.k.a. G-Neila) and Manuel Hoffelner (a.k.a. Manix). The duo represented Austria in the Eurovision Song Contest 2012 with the song "Woki mit deim Popo", after winning the Austrian national final, but did not pass the semi-final finishing last in the first semi-final and scored just 8 points which was the lowest of all the semi-final entrants. They were a Mundart (dialect) band with their songs being in Austrian.

== Discography ==
=== Albums ===
Title	Album details	Peak chart positions
Title	Album details	AUT
Oidaah pumpn muas's	Released: 1 February 2011; Label: Sony Music; Formats: CD, digital download	1
Prolettn feian längaah	Released: 28 June 2011; Label: Sony Music; Formats: CD, digital download	1
Traktorgängstapartyrap	Released: 6 January 2012; Label: Sony Music; Formats: CD, digital download	—
Zruck zu de Ruabm	Released: 10 February 2012; Label: Sony Music; Formats: CD, digital download	3

=== Singles ===
Year	Title	Peak chart positions	Album
Year	Title	AUT	Album
2010	"Oida Taunz!"	1	Oidaah pumpn muas's
2011	"Guuugarutz"	1	Oidaah pumpn muas's
2011	"Killalady"	2	Oidaah pumpn muas's
2011	"Grüllarei"	18	Prolettn feian längaah
2011	"Touchdown"	48	Traktorgängstapartyrap
2011	"Oida Chüüü"	38	Traktorgängstapartyrap
2012	"Woki mit deim Popo"	2	Traktorgängstapartyrap
2012	"Geila Ois ..."	52	Zruck zu de Ruabm

=== Other charted songs ===
Year	Title	Peak chart positions
Year	Title	AUT
2011	"Trackshittaz"	38
2011	"Laudaah"	50
2011	"Pumpn muas's"	70
2011	"Hawaraheisl"	36

Awards and achievements
Preceded by Nadine Beiler with "The Secret Is Love"	Austria in the Eurovision Song Contest; 2012	Succeeded by Natália Kelly with "Shine"
