= Alexandre Luneau =

French poker player (born 1988)

- Nicknames: Alexonmoon; BiatchPeople
- Born: 2 January 1988 (age 38); France

World Series of Poker
- Bracelet: None
- Final tables: 7
- Money finishes: 15
- Highest WSOP Main Event finish: 396th, 2010

European Poker Tour
- Money finishes: 2

Alexandre Luneau (born 2 January 1988) is a high-stakes French professional poker player specialising in mixed games.

== Career ==
Alexandre Luneau started playing online poker in 2007 whilst studying in engineering school. With just a $5 deposit, Luneau turned it into $15,000 in a few months. In 2008, he dedicated himself fully to playing poker. In 2009, Alexandre joined team Limpers where he produced poker educational content. In November 2010, Alexonmoon joined Full Tilt Pro Team.

Alexandre Luneau partnered with fellow French professional poker player Sebastien "Seb86" Sabic to improve their edge over the competition.

In 2013, Luneau won the 8 game high roller WCOOP tournament on Pokerstars for $234,350.00.

In April–May 2014, Luneau won over $1,200,000 online and was the month's biggest winner.

In 2014, Alexandre Luneau was featured in a 90 min documentary called Nosebleed. The documentary received many positive reviews, eventually winning a European poker award . In 2015, Alexonmoon joined Team Pro Winamax, France's largest poker site.

Luneau is considered one of the biggest winners in online poker and the most profitable mixed game player.

Alexandre has won over $400,000 in live tournaments. Luneau finished 3rd in the 2016 World Series of Poker $10,000 Heads-Up No-Limit Hold'em Championship winning $123,929 in Event #9.

=== Online poker ===
Luneau plays under the alias Alexonmoon and Alex Luneau on Full Tilt Poker and BiatchPeople on PokerStars where he has amassed over $1,200,000, $1,100,000 and $3,300,000 respectively.
