= Face the Day (Natália Kelly song) =

Single by Natália Kelly

from the album Natália Kelly
- Released: 12 July 2013
- Genre: Pop rock
- Length: 3:32
- Label: Universal Music Austria
- Songwriter(s): Noel Cohen, Dan Zweben

Natália Kelly singles chronology
"Shine" (2013)	"Face the Day" (2013)

Music video
- "Face the Day" on YouTube

"Face the Day" is a song recorded by Austrian singer Natália Kelly. It was released on 12 July 2013 as the second single of Natalia Kelly, the debut album of the singer.

== Track listing ==
Face the Day – Single

1. Face the Day – 3:29
2. Face the Day (Radio Edit) – 3:21

== Music video ==
The music video was published on 16 July 2013. The video consists of scenes from her experience at the Österreich rockt den Song Contest and the 2013 Eurovision Song Contest.
