= Austria in the Eurovision Song Contest 2007 =

- Eurovision Song Contest 2007
- Participating broadcaster: Österreichischer Rundfunk (ORF)
- Country: Austria
- Selection process: Internal selection
- Announcement date: Artist: 20 February 2007; Song: 7 March 2007

Competing entry
- Song: "Get a Life – Get Alive"
- Artist: Eric Papilaya
- Songwriters: Greg Usek; Austin Howard

Placement
- Semi-final result: Failed to qualify (27th)

Participation chronology

Austria was represented at the Eurovision Song Contest 2007 with the song "Get a Life – Get Alive", composed by Greg Usek, with lyrics by Austin Howard, and performed by Eric Papilaya. The Austrian participating broadcaster, Österreichischer Rundfunk (ORF), internally selected its entry for the contest. In October 2006, ORF announced that it would be returning to the contest after a one-year absence following its withdrawal in 2006 due to poor results in 2005. On 20 February 2007, ORF announced that they had internally selected Eric Papilaya to compete at the 2007 contest, while "Get a Life – Get Alive" was presented to the public on 7 March 2007.

Austria competed in the semi-final of the Eurovision Song Contest which took place on 10 May 2007. Performing during the show in position 27, "Get a Life – Get Alive" was not announced among the top 10 entries of the semi-final and therefore did not qualify to compete in the final. It was later revealed that Austria placed twenty-seventh out of the 28 participating countries in the semi-final with 4 points.

== Background ==
Prior to the 2007 contest, Österreichischer Rundfunk (ORF) has participated in the Eurovision Song Contest representing Austria forty-two times since its first entry in 1957. It has won the contest on one occasion: in 1966 with the song "Merci, Chérie" performed by Udo Jürgens. Following the introduction of semi-finals for the 2004 contest, Austria has featured in only one final. Its least successful result has been last place, achieved on seven occasions, most recently in 1991. It has also received nul points on three occasions: in 1962, in 1988, and in 1991.

As part of its duties as participating broadcaster, ORF organises the selection of its entry in the Eurovision Song Contest and broadcasts the event in the country. Following the 2005 contest, the broadcaster announced in June 2005 that it would not participate in 2006 citing poor results in the 2005 contest as the reason for its decision. Following its one-year absence, ORF confirmed its intentions to participate at the 2007 contest on 21 October 2006. From 2002 to 2005, ORF had set up national finals with several artists to choose both the song and performer to compete at Eurovision for Austria. For the 2007 contest, ORF held an internal selection to choose the artist and song. This method had last been used in 2000.

== Before Eurovision ==
=== Internal selection ===
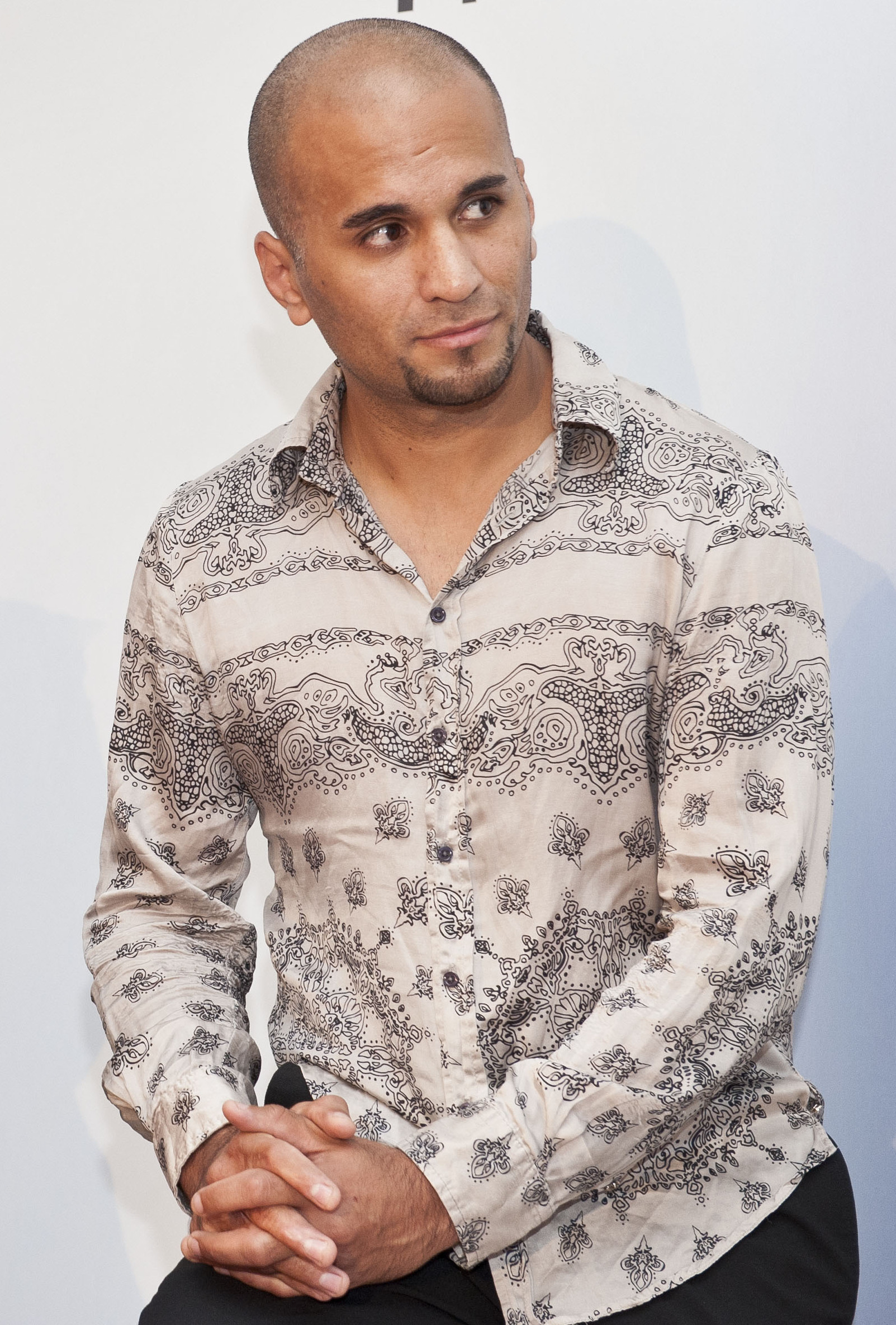
Eric Papilaya went on to represent Austria in the 2007 contest.

On 20 February 2007, ORF announced that they had internally selected Eric Papilaya to represent Austria in the Eurovision Song Contest 2007. Papilaya participated in the third season of the talent show Starmania where he was a finalist. On 7 March 2007, the song "Get a Life – Get Alive" was presented as the Austrian entry for the contest during the radio show Ö3-Wecker, aired on Ö3. Both Papilaya and the song, written by Greg Usek and Austin Howard, was selected by a panel of music and entertainment industry experts led by ORF Head of Entertainment Edgar Böhm. "Get a Life – Get Alive" was also announced as the official 2007 theme song of the AIDS charity event Life Ball, continuing the historical relationship between the Austrian Eurovision entry and the Life Ball event.

=== Promotion ===
Prior to the contest, Eric Papilaya specifically promoted "Get a Life – Get Alive" as the Austrian Eurovision entry during his Get a Life bus tour, which departed from Vienna on 20 April and arrived in Helsinki for the contest on 4 May. The tour covered 15 cities across Europe and included several international television and radio appearances. In addition to his international appearances, Eric Papilaya performed "Get a Life – Get Alive" as a musical guest during the ORF eins programme Dancing With Stars on 20 April, while a farewell concert was held at the Heidenplatz on 20 April before the bus tour.

== At Eurovision ==
According to Eurovision rules, all nations with the exceptions of the host country, the "Big Four" (France, Germany, Spain and the United Kingdom) and the ten highest placed finishers in the 2006 contest are required to qualify from the semi-final on 10 May 2007 in order to compete for the final on 12 May 2007. On 12 March 2007, a special allocation draw was held which determined the running order for the semi-final. As one of the five wildcard countries, Austria chose to perform in position 27, following the entry from Turkey and before the entry from Latvia.

The semi-final and the final were broadcast in Austria on ORF 2 with commentary by Andi Knoll. ORF appointed Eva Pölzl as its spokesperson to announce the Austrian votes during the final.

=== Semi-final ===
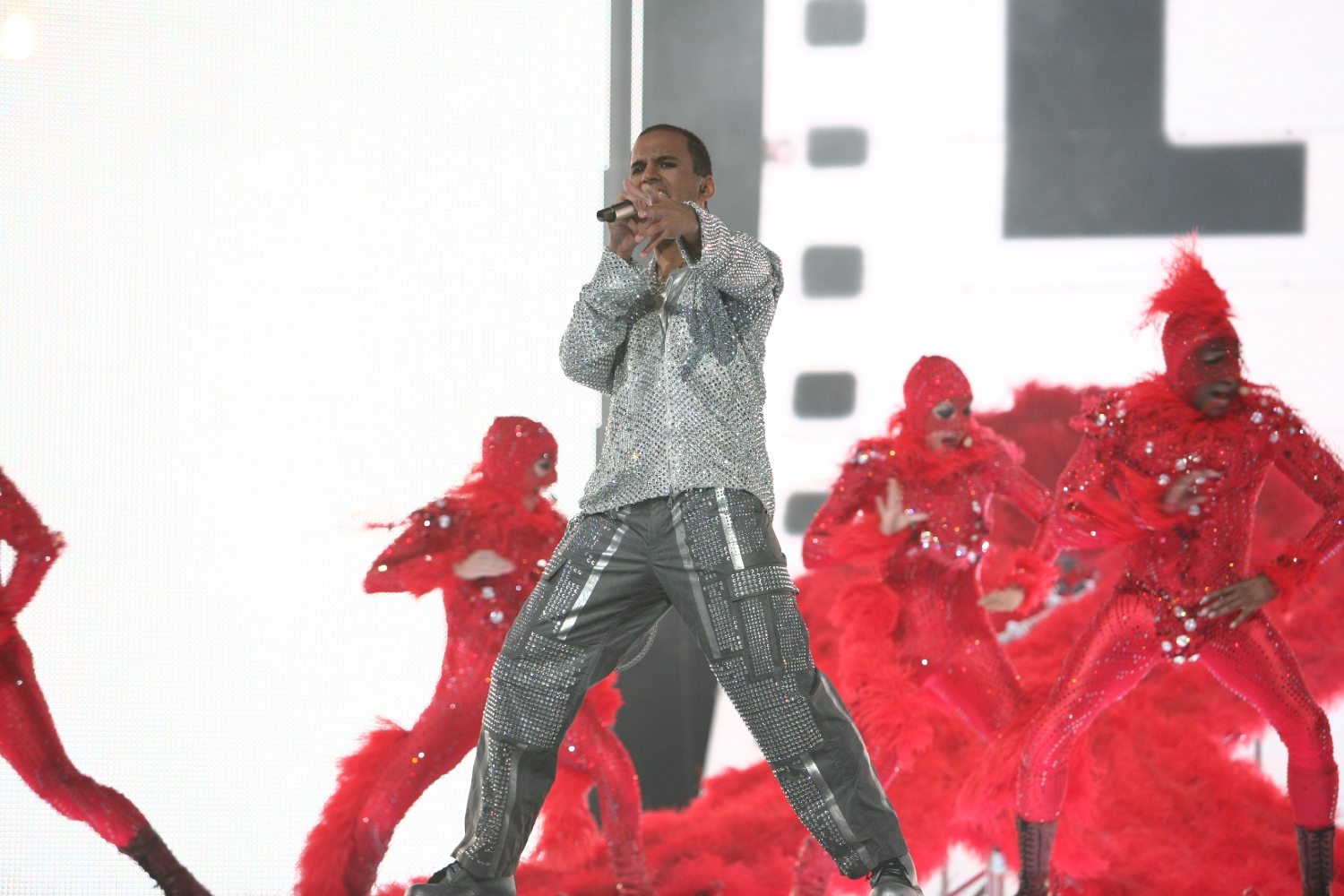
Eric Papilaya during a rehearsal before the semi-final

Eric Papilaya took part in technical rehearsals on 4 and 6 May, followed by dress rehearsals on 9 and 10 May. The Austrian performance featured Eric Papilaya performing on stage in a silver suit designed by British designer Vivienne Westwood with 2,000 Swarovski crystals attached, with the words "Get Alive" scrolling horizontally and vertically on the LED screens. The performance began with Papilaya coming out from the loop of a 700 meter red feathered AIDS ribbon prop attached with 14,000 Swarovski crystals, of which four dancers/backing vocalists in red skin-tight feathered costumes were on. The performers later came off from the prop to the front of the stage to perform a dance routine accompanied by pyrotechnic effects. In regards to the performance, organiser of the Life Ball event Gery Keszler stated: "With this show we will conquer Europe and put the issue of AIDS in the spotlight but in an optimistic way." Eric Papilaya was also joined on stage by guitarist Thommy Pilat, while the four backing performers were: Cedric Lee Bradley, Jerome Knols, Laura Fernandez and Nina Weiß.

At the end of the show, Austria was not announced among the top 10 entries in the semi-final and therefore failed to qualify to compete in the final. It was later revealed that Austria placed twenty-seventh in the semi-final, receiving a total of 4 points.

=== Voting ===
Below is a breakdown of points awarded to Austria and awarded by Austria in the semi-final and grand final of the contest. The nation awarded its 12 points to Serbia in the semi-final and the final of the contest.

==== Points awarded to Austria ====
Points awarded to Austria (Semi-final)
Score	Country
12 points	
10 points	
8 points	
7 points	
6 points	
5 points	
4 points	
3 points	Switzerland
2 points	
1 point	Andorra

==== Points awarded by Austria ====
Points awarded by Austria (Semi-final)
Score	Country
12 points	Serbia
10 points	Turkey
8 points	Hungary
7 points	Croatia
6 points	Bulgaria
5 points	Macedonia
4 points	Poland
3 points	Albania
2 points	Slovenia
1 point	Latvia

Points awarded by Austria (Final)
Score	Country
12 points	Serbia
10 points	Turkey
8 points	Bosnia and Herzegovina
7 points	Germany
6 points	Bulgaria
5 points	Armenia
4 points	Ukraine
3 points	Romania
2 points	Hungary
1 point	Macedonia

== After Eurovision ==
Due to poor results in its latest participations, as well as its dissatisfaction with the results of 2007 contest, Austria withdrew from the Eurovision Song Contest 2008. The absence lasted for three years, and the country returned to the contest in 2011.
