= Was wir sind =

Single by Nadine

from the album Komm doch mal rüber
- Released: May 4, 2007 (Austria)
- Genre: Pop; Contemporary R&B
- Label: Universal Music
- Songwriter(s): Frank Wildhorn
- Producer(s): Alexander Kahr

Nadine singles chronology
"Alles was du willst" (2007)	"Was wir sind" (2007)	"The Secret Is Love" (2011)

Was wir sind (Translation:"What we are") is a song by Austrian recording artists Nadine. It is the second single from her debut album, Komm doch mal rüber. Nadine performed the song on the final of Dancing with the Stars. The single peaked in the Austrian Singles Chart at number 15.

== Background ==
"Was wir sind" is the fifth track from the Nadine's album Komm doch mal rüber. The song is in German with the lyrics by Florian Cojocaru and the music by Frank Wildhorn A review from Der kultur-channel said Was wir sind was good but left no impression. According to Vorarlberg Online the press said the ballad showed "surprisingly mature sides" Nadine said the song was about friendship and togetherness and that she sang the song for her friend Julia. Nadine performed the song on the final of Dancing with the Stars The song was released in Austria as a single on May 4, 2007. The single debuted in the Austrian Singles Chart at its peak position of 15, the single was unable to improve on the initial entry position but did climb once in its eight weeks chart run.

Was wir sind is about friendship and togetherness. I sing the song especially for my best friend Julia.

— Nadine Beiler

== Track listing ==
Digital download
No.	Title	Length
1.	"Was Wir Sind" (Radio Version)	3:24
2.	"Was Wir Sind" (Karaoke Version)	3:24

CD single
No.	Title	Length
1.	"Was Wir Sind" (Radio Version)	3:24
2.	"Was Wir Sind" (Karaoke Version)	3:24

06025 1734139 (UMG) / EAN 0602517341395

== Charts ==
Chart (2007)	Peak position
Austria (Ö3 Austria Top 40)	15
