= Hansi Lang =

Austrian singer and actor (1955–2008)

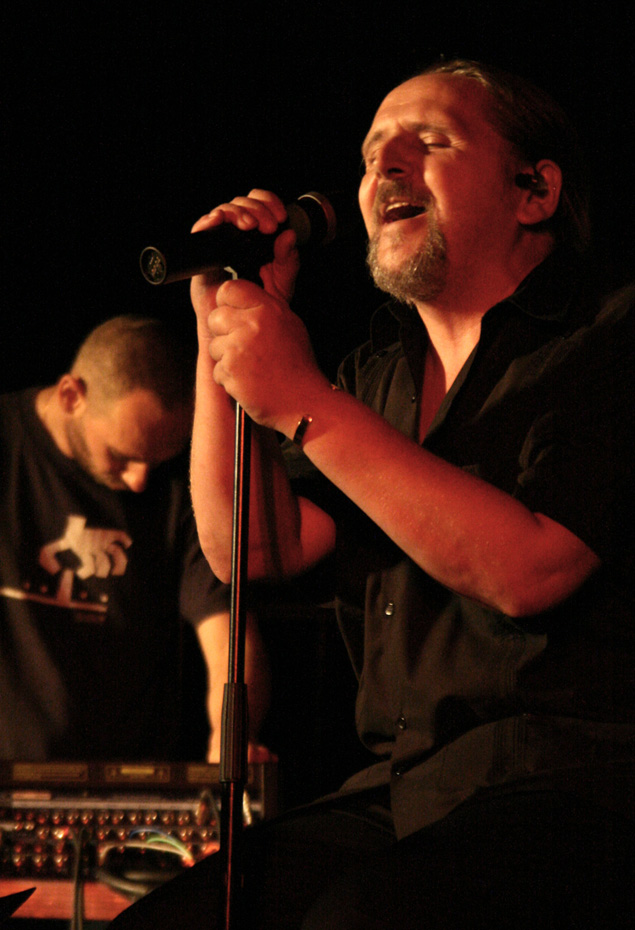
The Austrian band The Slow Club; Concert on Karlsplatz in Vienna as part of the Karlsplatz art zone. Hansi Lang - voc., Wolfgang Schlögl - electronics.

Hansi Lang (born 13 January 1955, in Hernals, Vienna; died 24 August 2008 in Vienna) was an Austrian singer and actor.

== Discography ==
=== Alben ===
- Keine Angst (1982)
- Der Taucher (1982)
- Pyramidenmann (1984)
- Ich oder Du (1984)
- Hansi Lang (1989)
- Losgeher (1993)
- The Original Very Best Of (1993)
- Spiele Leben – Live (1998)

The Slow Club

- Welcome to the Slow Club, EP (2004)
- This Is the Slow Club (2005)
- House of Sleep (2008)
- Sing Hansi! Lieder aus dem Gemeindebau (2025). Produced, arranged & published posthumously by Thomas Rabitsch.

== Awards ==
- 2006: Amadeus Austrian Music Award for This Is The Slow Club in the category "Jazz/Blues/Folk-Album des Jahres national" mit The Slow Club
- 2006: Goldenes Verdienstzeichen der Stadt Wien
- 2009: Amadeus Austrian Music Award in the category "Lifetime Achievement Award"

== Literature ==
- Fabian Burstein: Kind ohne Zeit – Das intensive Leben des Hansi Lang, Biografie, Residenz Verlag 2008
