= Falco De Jong Luneau =

Austrian-Dutch singer-songwriter

Falco (de Jong) Luneau
- Also known as: Wolfsrachen
- Origin: Austria
- Genres: Pop; rock
- Occupation: Singer-songwriter
- Years active: 2006–present
- Website: www.falcoluneau.com

Falco (De Jong) Luneau (7 August 1984) is an Austrian-Dutch singer-songwriter. He is best known for his 2006 participation in the Austrian version of American Idol, Starmania and his subsequent formation of the boyband “jetzt anders!” with several other participants, notably Tom Neuwirth, who in his Conchita Wurst persona won the Eurovision Song Contest 2014. After two hits in Austria, and their album Gut so reaching 9th on the Austrian charts, the band dissolved after just one year.

== Early life ==
Falco Luneau was born in 1984 in Bludenz in Vorarlberg, and grew up in the mountain village of Brand. He is the son of the Dutchwoman Jacqueline de Jong Luneau and the Austrian Rudolf Neslerhold, and as a result holds dual Austrian/Dutch citizenship. Before his musical career, he worked as a welder repairing ship- and harbour mobile cranes around the world.

== Musical career ==
After his 2006 participation in Starmania and year with "jetzt anders!", Luneau went solo. In 2009, he won the Radio 538 Demo Duel with his song "Nobody", which became the "Alarmschijf" (the most played song in Netherlands) and spent 5 weeks on the Dutch charts, topping out at 28th. After releasing his singles "I’m Still Pretending" and "No One's Fool", he toured with the Dutch artist Waylon from The Common Linnets before releasing his debut album "Years From Now".

In 2012, Luneau had his first chart success on the Netherlands Antilles with his summer hit "Skintight" and saw "25 Lightyears Away" with DJ Yanou selected as the Dancesmash of the week (most played dance track in the Netherlands).

In 2013 he participated in the Austrian ORF television show "Austria rocks the Song Contest" (Eurovision Song Contest pre-selection round) but did not win, and returned to the Vorarlberg to focus on songwriting and social activism.

== Social Activism ==
Since 2014, Luneau has focused on socially critical music projects under the pseudonym Wolfsrachen. In solidarity with the wave of refugees in 2015, this first project was created with the student choir of the Music Middle School in Thüringen, “Frieden ist kein Wintergarten” (Peace is not a Greenhouse). With partner organization "Team Freiheit" (Team Freedom), this resulted in a transnational school education initiative for the clarification of European values and human rights.

2016, Falco Luneau co-operated with SOS Kinderdorf/147 Rat auf Draht in Austria and Nummer gegen Kummer in Germany for his second socially critical project “Dein Lachen – Brich dein Schweigen!” (Your Laughter - Break the Silence!) about physical, psychological and sexual abuse against children and adolescents. Made in cooperation with international artists like Rami Jaffee of the Foo Fighters, Austrian actor Harald Krassnitzer and ex-Puma chief designer Ralf Metzenmacher, the music video received international awards. These included in 2017 "Best Music Video" and "Best Actress" for co-star Lea Immler at the Kolkata Shorts International Film Festival in India. In the same year, the project was awarded the "Austrian Youth Award" by the government. In 2018, Lea Immler received another Best Actress Award at the New York City Independent Film Festival and at LA's New Media Film Festival, the music video was honored with Best Socially Responsible Content.

== See also ==
- jetzt anders!
- Conchita Wurst
