= The Slow Club =

Australian pop rock band

- Origin: Melbourne, Australia
- Genres: Pop rock
- Years active: 1989–1991
- Labels: Virgin Records

The Slow Club were a short lived Australian pop rock band formed in the late 1980s. The group were signed to Virgin Records and released one studio album in 1990.

== Discography ==
=== Albums ===
List of albums, with selected details and chart positions
Title	Album details	Peak chart positions
Title	Album details	AUS
World of Wonders	Released: November 1990; Label: Virgin (VOZC2042); Formats: Cassette, LP, CD	101

=== Singles ===
List of singles, with selected chart positions
Year	Title	Peak chart positions	Album
Year	Title	AUS	Album
1990	"Shout Me Down"	36	World of Wonders
1991	"Rosalie"	46	World of Wonders
1991	"When Love Comes Down"	121	World of Wonders
