= Papermoon (duo) =

Band

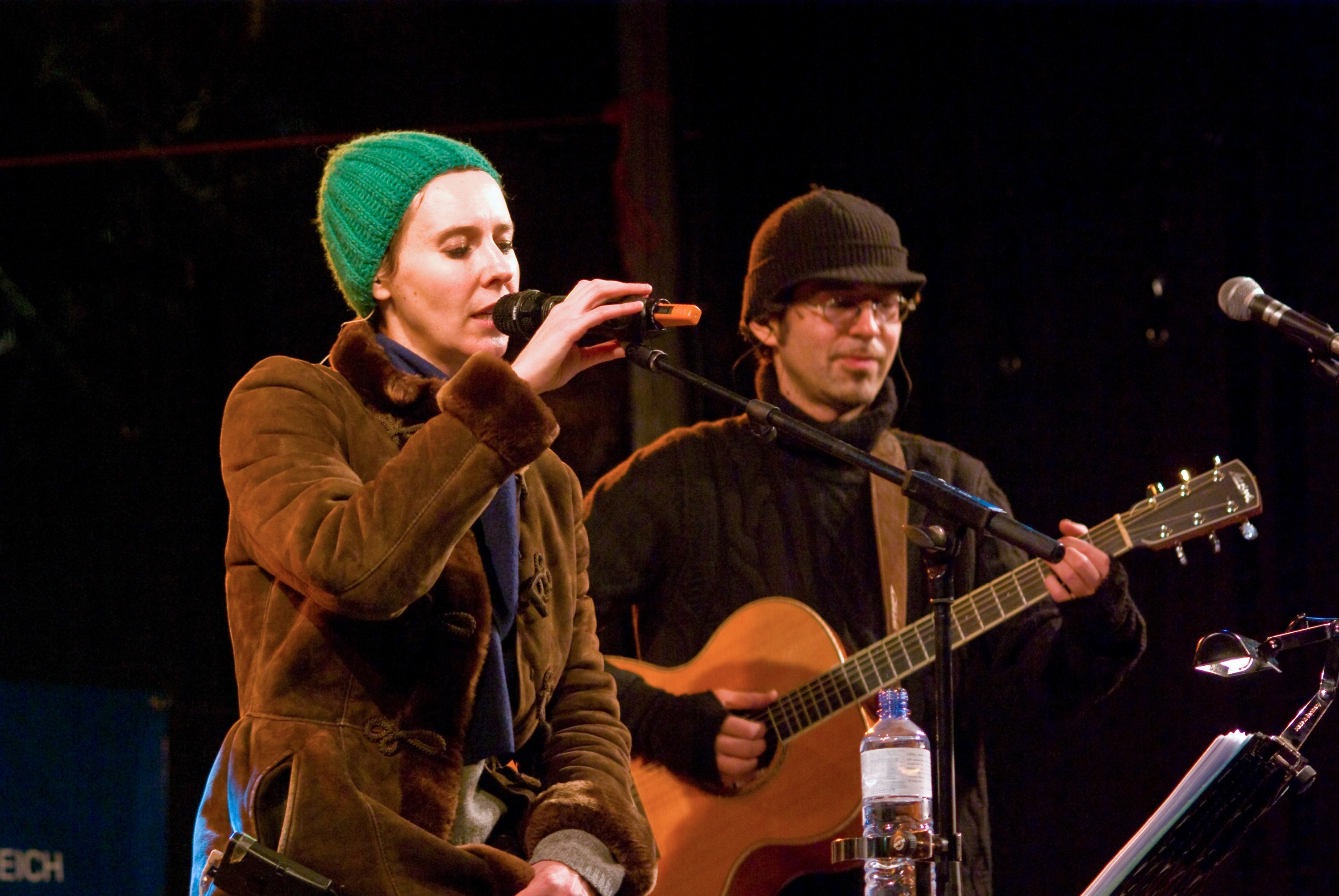
- Papermoon in Sankt Pölten (2008)

Background information
- Origin: Vienna, Austria
- Genres: Austropop, folk, pop
- Years active: 1991–present
- Label: Universal Music Austria
- Members: Edina Thalhammer
- Past members: Roumina Straub; Barbara Pichler; Christof Straub

Papermoon is a guitar and vocals duo based in Vienna, Austria, that has released nine albums.

== History ==
Papermoon was started in 1991 by Christof Straub (guitar) and Edina Thalhammer (vocals). They had a successful career with acoustic music (guitar and vocals), during the 1990s, predominantly in Austria. After their song "Night After Night" received frequent airplay on the Austrian radio station Ö3, Papermoon signed a recording contract in 1992. Their first album went double platinum with total sales over 100,000. Both of their follow-up albums went gold. Papermoon's most well-known songs are "Tell Me A Poem" and "Lucy’s Eyes.”

Edina Thalhammer left the group in 1996, for a period of almost seven years, during which she was replaced by Roumina Straub and later, for a short time, by Barbara Pichler. During this time, Papermoon released a maxi-single and a best-of album (which included three new titles). Edina Thalhammer embarked on a solo career in 2002 with her project called Tau. In 2004, the original members of Papermoon reunited.

In 2006, Papermoon was awarded the Amadeus Austrian Music Award in the Pop/Rock Group category for the album True Love.

Guitarist Christof Straub died on 9 September 2026, at the age of 57.

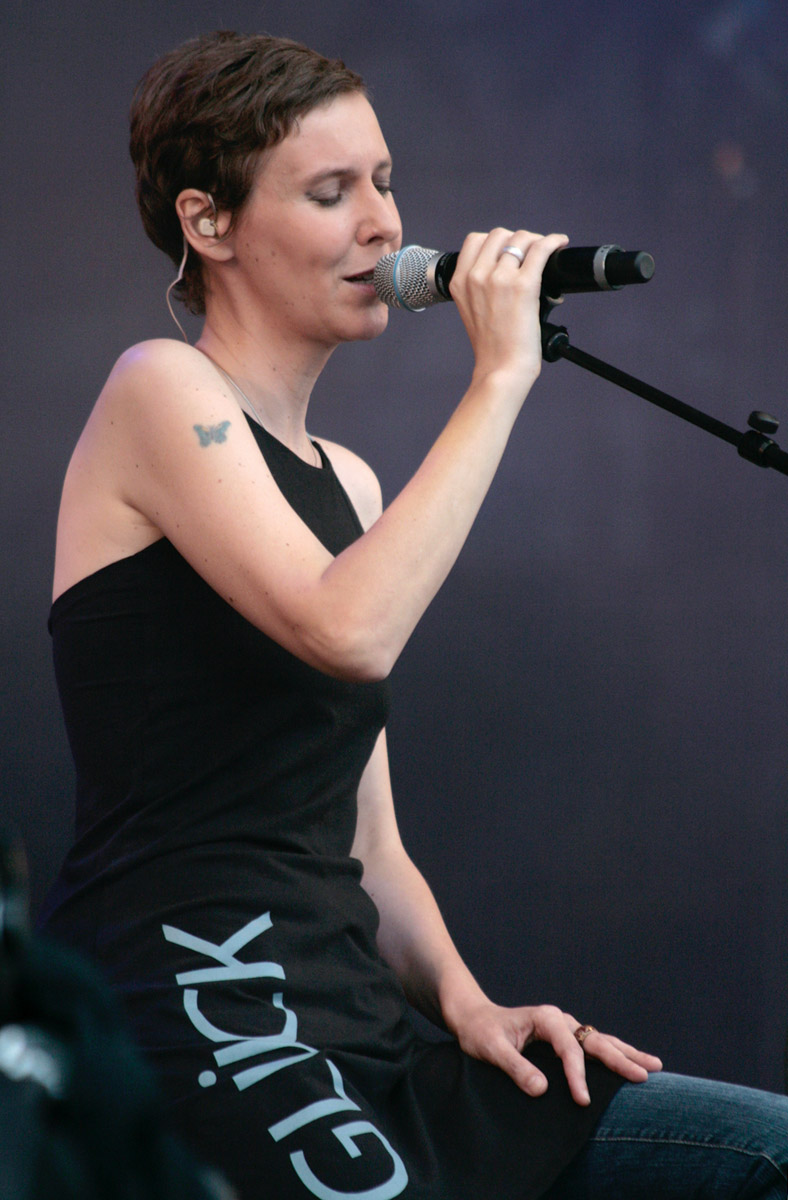
Edina Thalhammer

== Members ==
=== Current members ===
- Edina Thalhammer – vocals

=== Former members ===
- Roumina Straub – vocals
- Barbara Pichler – vocals
- Christof Straub – guitar (died 2026)

== Discography ==
=== Albums ===
- 1993 – Tell Me a Poem
- 1994 – The World in Lucy's Eyes
- 1996 – Papermoon
- 2004 – Come Closer
- 2005 – True Love
- 2006 – Christmas Unplugged
- 2007 – Verzaubert
- 2008 – When the Lights Go Down
- 2011 – Wake!

=== Compilations ===
- 2002 – Past and Present
- 2005 – Austropop Kult

=== Singles ===
- 1992: "Night After Night"
- 1992: "Tell Me a Poem"
- 1993: "Dancing Again"
- 1994: "Lucy's Eyes"
- 1995: "Catch Me"
- 1996: "The Blue Sky of Mine"
- 1997: "Sleep"
- 1998: "Come Dance With Me"
- 2002: "Doop Doop"
- 2002: "Doop Doop X-Mas"
- 2004: "I Was Blind"
- 2004: "On the Day Before Christmas"
- 2007: "Verzaubert" (digital only)
- 2007: "The Time Is Now"
- 2008: "The Fields of Summer"
- 2011: "Wake"
- 2012: "Vater, Father, mon pêre"
