= Woki mit deim Popo =

2011 song by Trackshittaz

Single by Trackshittaz
- Language: Mühlviertlerisch
- Released: 5 December 2011
- Genre: Hip hop
- Length: 2:58
- Label: Sony Music Entertainment Austria
- Songwriters: Lukas Plöchl; Manuel Hoffelner
- Producer: Sam Vahdat

Trackshittaz singles chronology
"Oida Chüüü" (2011)	"Woki mit deim Popo" (2011)	"Geila Ois ..." (2012)

Music video
- "Woki mit deim Popo" on YouTube

Eurovision Song Contest 2012 entry
- Country: Austria
- Artist: Trackshittaz

Finals performance
- Semi-final result: 18th
- Semi-final points: 8

Entry chronology
- ◄ "The Secret Is Love" (2011)
- "Shine" (2013) ►

Official performance video
- "Woki mit deim Popo" on YouTube

"Woki mit deim Popo" ([ˈvɔkɪ mɪt daɪm ˈpoːpo]; colloquial Austrian German for "wiggle your butt") is a 2012 single by Austrian rap duo Trackshittaz. The song represented Austria at the Eurovision Song Contest 2012, after winning Österreich rockt den Song Contest, Austria's national final. The song would then proceed to fail to qualify, only scoring 8 points, securing a last-place finish in 18th.

== Background ==
According to one of the band's rappers, Manuel Hoffelner, the song was created during the ongoing European debt crisis as a way for people to keep good spirits during the crisis.

== Release ==
The song was released on 5 December 2011, with the music video being released on Trackshittaz's official YouTube channel.

== Eurovision Song Contest ==
=== Österreich rockt den Song Contest ===
Österreich rockt den Song Contest (Austria rocks the Song Contest) was the national final that selected Austria's entry for the Eurovision Song Contest 2012. The competition took place on 24 February 2012 at the ORF Center in Vienna. The show was broadcast on ORF eins as well as streamed online via ORF's official website and the official Eurovision Song Contest website eurovision.tv.

Nine of the ten artists were nominated by the radio channel Ö3, while a tenth act was chosen through a wildcard selection. The nine nominated artists were revealed on 1 December 2011 during the radio show Ö3-Wecker, aired on Ö3, while "How Can You Ask Me?" performed by Mary Broadcast Band was revealed on 9 January 2012 as the winner of the wildcard selection. Trackshittaz was announced as one of the nine artists nominated.

During the final, ten songs competed in the first round where the top two were selected by a public vote to proceed to the second round. "Woki mit deim Popo" was announced as one of the top two. In the second round, public televoting selected "Woki mit deim Popo" performed by Trackshittaz as the winner. As a result, "Woki mit deim Popo" would go on to represent Austria in the Eurovision Song Contest 2012.

=== At Eurovision ===
According to Eurovision rules, all nations with the exceptions of the host country and the "Big Five" (France, Germany, Italy, Spain and the United Kingdom) are required to qualify from one of two semi-finals in order to compete for the final; the top ten countries from each semi-final progress to the final. The European Broadcasting Union (EBU) split up the competing countries into six different pots based on voting patterns from previous contests, with countries with favourable voting histories put into the same pot. On 25 January 2012, a special allocation draw was held which placed each country into one of the two semi-finals, as well as which half of the show they would perform in. Austria was placed into the first semi-final, to be held on 22 May 2012, and was scheduled to perform in the second half of the show. The running order for the semi-finals was decided through another draw on 20 March 2012 and Austria was set to perform in position 16, following the entry from Hungary and before the entry from Moldova.

The song would manage an 18th place finish in the semi-final, earning 8 points in the process. As the song did not finish top 10, the song did not qualify for the final.

== Reception ==
Initial reviews were mixed. In the annual Wiwibloggs Wiwi Jury, some would praise the band for sending something unique to the contest, while some thought the song was sexist.
