= Conchita Wurst discography =

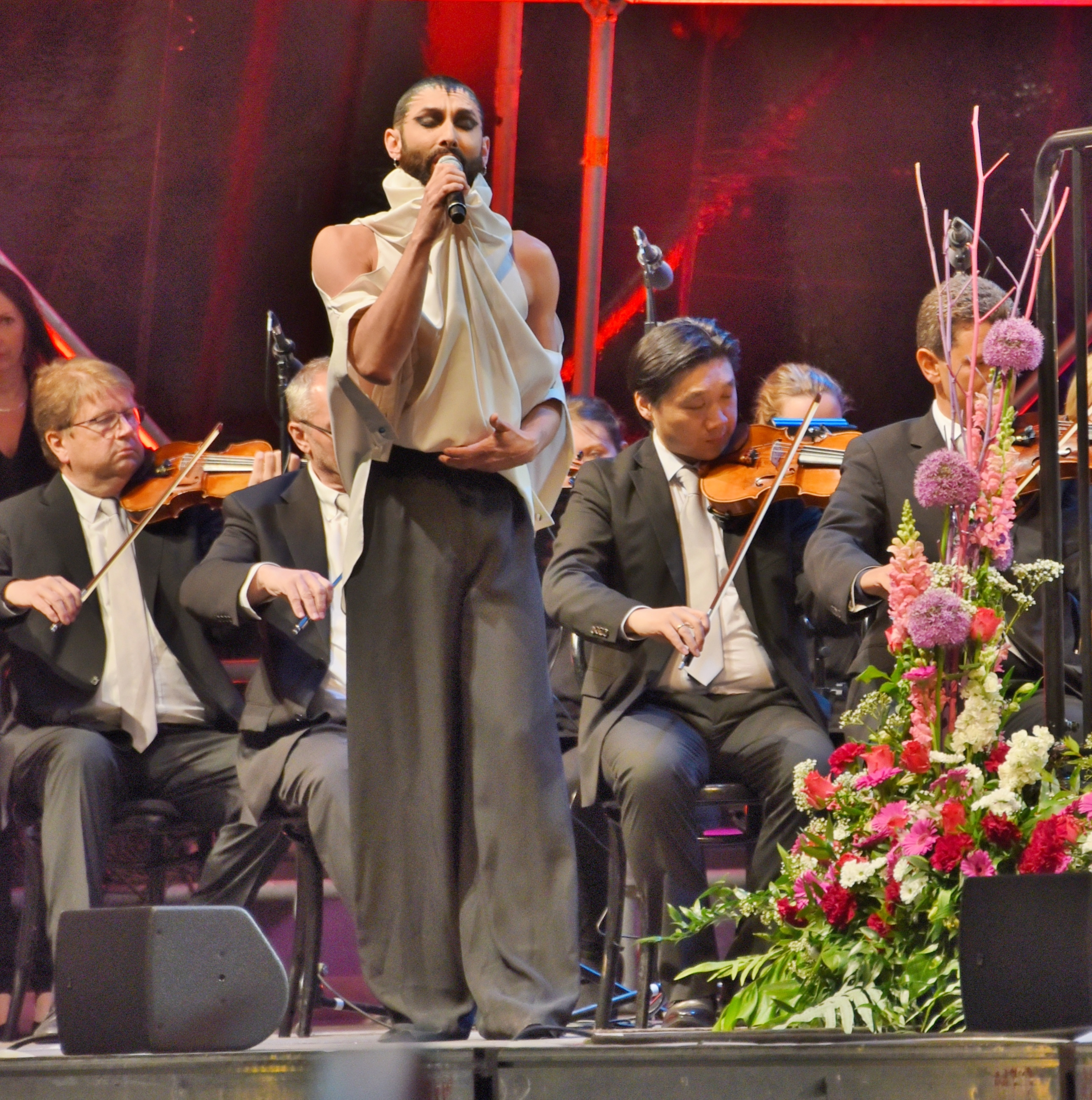
- Wurst performing in 2019
- Studio albums: 3
- EPs: 3
- Singles: 22

Austrian singer and recording artist Conchita Wurst has released three studio albums, three extended play and eighteen singles. His debut studio album, Conchita, was released in May 2015. The album peaked at number one on the Austrian Albums Chart, and includes the singles "Rise like a Phoenix" (her Eurovision Song Contest 2014 winning song), "Heroes", "You Are Unstoppable", "Firestorm" and "Colours of Your Love". His second studio album, From Vienna with Love, was released in October 2018. The album peaked at number one on the Austrian Albums Chart, and includes the singles "The Sound of Music" and "Für mich soll's rote Rosen regnen". The third studio album and first as WURST, Truth Over Magnitude, was released in October 2019. The album peaked at number three on the Austrian Albums Chart, and includes the singles "Trash All the Glam", "Hit Me", "See Me Now", "To the Beat", "Forward" and "Under the Gun".

== Albums ==
List of albums, with selected details, peak chart positions and certifications
Title	Details	Peak chart positions									Certifications
Title	Details	AUT	AUS	BEL (Fl)	BEL (Wa)	FIN	GER	ITA	NLD	SWI	Certifications
Conchita	Released: 15 May 2015; Label: Sony Music Austria; Formats: Digital download, CD	1	26	17	41	28	23	30	67	6	IFPI AUT: Platinum
From Vienna with Love (with the Vienna Symphony)	Released: 19 October 2018; Label: Sony Music Austria; Formats: Digital download, CD	1	—	—	—	—	77	—	—	84	IFPI AUT: Gold
Truth Over Magnitude	Released: 25 October 2019; Label: Sony Music Austria; Formats: Digital download, CD, streaming	3	—	—	—	—	—	—	—	—	
"—" denotes releases that did not chart

=== Extended plays ===
Title	Details
Paris (Savoir-Vivre)	Released: 3 June 2022; Label: Singodd Records; Formats: Digital download, streaming
Mrs Thomas	Released: 25 April 2025; Label: Singodd Records; Formats: Digital download, streaming
Wundgeküsst (with Kyrre Kvam)	Released: 28 November 2025; Label: Singodd Records; Formats: Digital download, streaming

== Singles ==
=== As lead artist ===
List of singles as lead artist, with selected peak chart positions and certifications
Title	Year	Peak chart positions										Certifications	Album
Title	Year	AUT	BEL (Fl)	BEL (Wa)	DEN	GER	IRE	NLD	SWE	SWI	UK	Certifications	Album
"I'll Be There"	2011	—	—	—	—	—	—	—	—	—	—		Die große Chance
"Unbreakable"	2011	32	—	—	—	—	—	—	—	—	—		Non-album singles
"That's What I Am"	2012	12	—	—	—	—	—	—	—	—	—		Non-album singles
"Rise Like a Phoenix"	2014	1	8	19	6	5	10	3	27	2	17	IFPI AUT: Platinum	Conchita
"Heroes"	2014	4	130	97	—	—	—	—	—	—	—		Conchita
"You Are Unstoppable"	2015	13	79	129	—	67	—	—	—	—	—		Conchita
"Firestorm" / "Colours of Your Love"	2015	45	—	—	—	—	—	—	—	—	—		Conchita
"Heast as net" (with Ina Regen)	2017	36	—	—	—	—	—	—	—	—	—		Non-album single
"The Sound of Music"	2018	—	—	—	—	—	—	—	—	—	—		From Vienna with Love
"Für mich soll's rote Rosen regnen"	2018	—	—	—	—	—	—	—	—	—	—		From Vienna with Love
"Trash All the Glam"	2019	—	—	—	—	—	—	—	—	—	—		Truth Over Magnitude
"Hit Me"	2019	—	—	—	—	—	—	—	—	—	—		Truth Over Magnitude
"See Me Now"	2019	—	—	—	—	—	—	—	—	—	—		Truth Over Magnitude
"To the Beat"	2019	—	—	—	—	—	—	—	—	—	—		Truth Over Magnitude
"Forward"	2019	—	—	—	—	—	—	—	—	—	—		Truth Over Magnitude
"Under the Gun"	2019	—	—	—	—	—	—	—	—	—	—		Truth Over Magnitude
"Lovemachine" (with Lou Asril)	2020	—	—	—	—	—	—	—	—	—	—		Non-album singles
"Malebu"	2021	—	—	—	—	—	—	—	—	—	—		Non-album singles
"Bodymorphia"	2021	—	—	—	—	—	—	—	—	—	—		Non-album singles
"All I Wanna Do"	2022	—	—	—	—	—	—	—	—	—	—		Paris (Savoir-Vivre)
"Car (Idhlargt)"	2022	—	—	—	—	—	—	—	—	—	—		Paris (Savoir-Vivre)
"Paris (Savoir-Vivre)"	2022	—	—	—	—	—	—	—	—	—	—		Paris (Savoir-Vivre)
"Erstmal Pause"	2022	—	—	—	—	—	—	—	—	—	—		Non-album singles
"All That I Wanted"	2022	—	—	—	—	—	—	—	—	—	—		Non-album singles
"Call Me Up"	2022	—	—	—	—	—	—	—	—	—	—		Non-album singles
"Dirty Maria"	2022	—	—	—	—	—	—	—	—	—	—		Non-album singles
"Any Day From Now On"	2024	—	—	—	—	—	—	—	—	—	—		Mrs Thomas
"Waters Run Deep"	2025	—	—	—	—	—	—	—	—	—	—		Mrs Thomas
"So Kalt Der Tod" (with Peter Plate and Ulf Sommer)	2025	—	—	—	—	—	—	—	—	—	—		Romeo & Julia: Die Star
"—" denotes a single that did not chart or was not released.

=== As featured artist ===
List of singles as featured artist
Title	Year	Album
"My Lights" (Axel Wolph featuring Conchita Wurst)	2014	Non-album singles
"Smalltown Boy" (Ricky Merino featuring Conchita Wurst)	2020	Non-album singles
