= Emmelie de Forest discography =

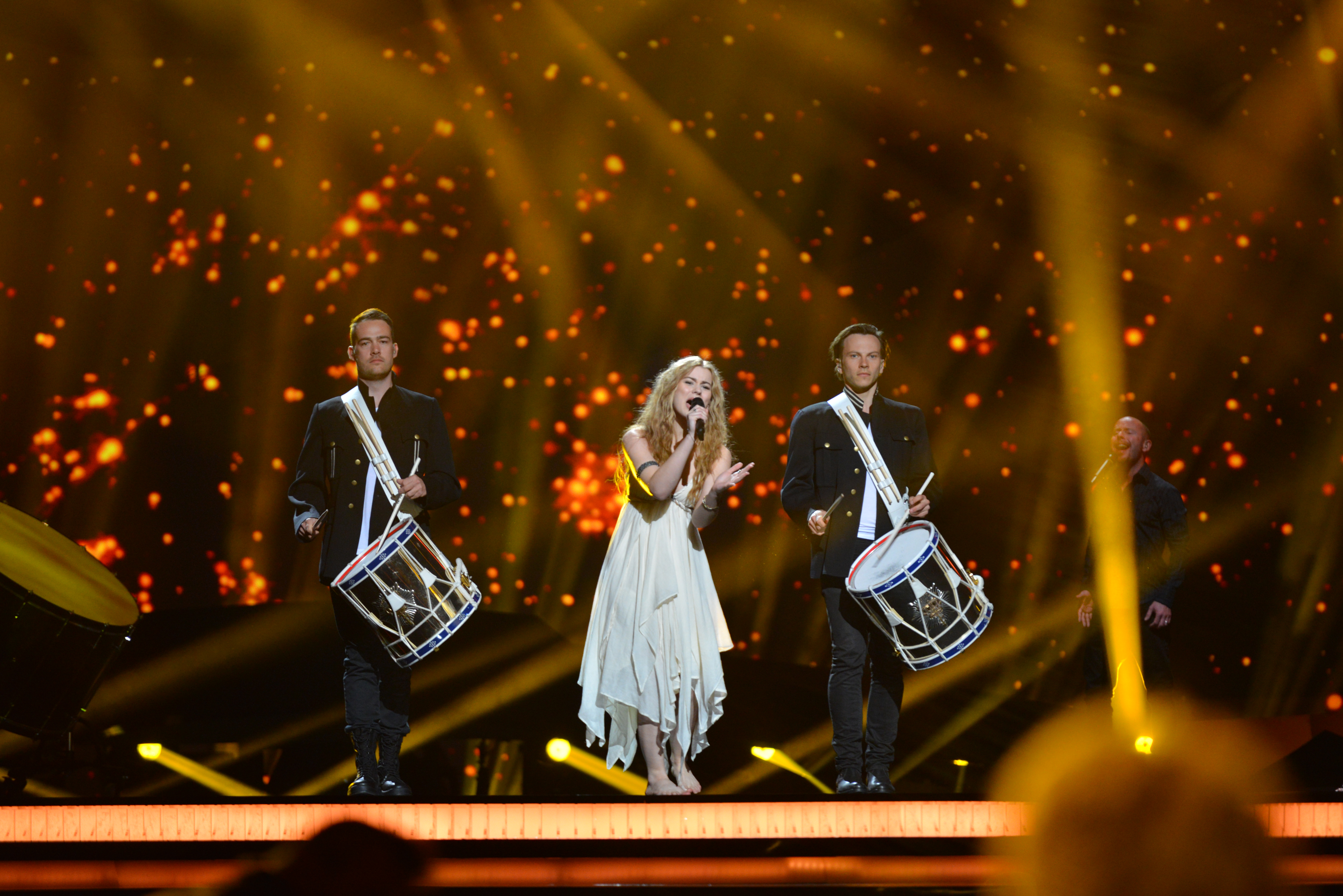
- De Forest performing in 2013
- Studio albums: 2
- EPs: 1
- Singles: 11

The discography of Danish singer Emmelie de Forest consists of two studio albums, one extended play, and eleven singles. She represented Denmark with the song "Only Teardrops" in the Eurovision Song Contest 2013 in Malmö, Sweden, winning the contest.

== Albums ==
Title	Details	Peak chart positions			
Title	Details	DEN	BEL	SWE	UK
Only Teardrops	Released: 6 May 2013; Label: Universal; Formats: Digital download, CD	4	140	32	148
History	Released: 9 February 2018; Label: Cosmos; Formats: Digital download	—	—	—	—
Into the Moon	Released: 25 April 2025; Label: Into the Moon; Formats: Digital download	—	—	—	—
"—" denotes an album that did not chart or was not released in that territory.

== Extended plays ==
Title	Details	Peak chart positions
Title	Details	DEN
Acoustic Session	Released: 1 September 2014; Label: Universal; Format: Digital download, streaming	79

== Singles ==
=== As lead artist ===
Title	Year	Peak chart positions										Certifications	Album
Title	Year	DEN	AUS	AUT	BEL	GER	IRE	NL	SWE	SWI	UK	Certifications	Album
"Only Teardrops"	2013	1	47	7	11	5	5	4	3	3	15	IFPI DEN: 2× Platinum	Only Teardrops
"Hunter & Prey"	2013	—	—	—	—	—	—	—	—	—	—		Only Teardrops
"Rainmaker"	2014	1	—	—	—	58	65	—	—	74	73	IFPI DEN: Gold	Eurovision Song Contest: Copenhagen 2014
"Drunk Tonight"	2014	—	—	—	—	—	—	—	—	—	—		Non-album single
"Hopscotch"	2015	—	—	—	—	—	—	—	—	—	—		Non-album single
"Sanctuary"	2017	—	—	—	—	—	—	—	—	—	—		History
"History"	2018	—	—	—	—	—	—	—	—	—	—		History
"Rabbit"	2018	—	—	—	—	—	—	—	—	—	—		History
"Going Ghost"	2019	—	—	—	—	—	—	—	—	—	—		History
"Typical Love Song"	2021	—	—	—	—	—	—	—	—	—	—		Non-album single
"Lovers Lullaby"	2024	—	—	—	—	—	—	—	—	—	—		Into the Moon
"Love Songs"	2024	—	—	—	—	—	—	—	—	—	—		Into the Moon
"Million to One"	2024	—	—	—	—	—	—	—	—	—	—		Into the Moon
"Drown In Champagne"	2025	—	—	—	—	—	—	—	—	—	—		Into the Moon
"Heartache Avenue"	2025	—	—	—	—	—	—	—	—	—	—		Into the Moon
"—" denotes a single that did not chart or was not released in that territory.

=== As featured artist ===
Title	Year	Album
"Wildfire" (with Fahrenhaidt)	2015	The Book of Nature
"Fire Rites" (with JazzKamikaze)	2017	Level
"Så bli’r Drenge til Mænd" (with Johnny Deluxe)	2018	Non-album single
"Between Heaven and Hell" (with Waqas)	2021	Non-album single

== Writing credits ==
Title	Year	Performing artist(s)	Co-writer(s)	Album
"Never Alone"	2016	Anja Nissen	MoZella, Rune Westberg	—
"Never Give Up on You"	2017	Lucie Jones	Daniel Salcedo, Lawrie Martin	Eurovision Song Contest: Kyiv 2017
