= Heroes (Conchita Wurst song) =

Single by Conchita Wurst

from the album Conchita
- Released: 8 November 2014
- Recorded: 2014
- Genre: Baroque pop; Pop
- Length: 3:43
- Label: Sony Music Austria
- Songwriter(s): Sebastian Arman, Joacim Persson, David Bronner, Thomas Neuwirth, Andreas Kleerup
- Producer(s): Joacim Persson, Sebastian Arman

Conchita Wurst singles chronology
"Rise Like a Phoenix" (2014)	"Heroes" (2014)	"My Lights" (2014)

"Heroes" is a pop song by Austrian singer Conchita Wurst. It was released on 8 November 2014. Conchita revealed to fans via her Facebook page that the release of the single would occur on 20 October and revealed the song title. The song is included on Wurst's debut album.

== Promotion and composition ==
Musically "Heroes" is a departure from Wurst's operatic pop style known from former singles like "Rise Like a Phoenix" or "That's What I Am". The composition still incorporates orchestral and classical elements but in a more minimal way. In contrast, the percussion elements are stronger than in her previous work. The song is mainly built of elements from baroque pop combined with parts of soul pop and world beat. Wurst pointed out that "Heroes" has invented a wholly different genre: "Ein ganz anderes Genre". It lasts for 3:43 minutes with support by a backing choir. Wurst called the song "... cooler than I thought I could sound like". The themes of "Heroes" are love, self empowerment and the battle against intolerance through the use of phrases such as, "Love is like a battle cry and we'll shine till our colours light up the sky and we'll dance to the sound of our battle cry". "Heroes" was released with significant anticipation from fans and the media on 8 November with its first live performance on Wetten, dass..? in Graz. The release date occurred two days before her birthday: "Conchita Wurst has released 'Heroes', bringing to an end months of anticipation for her countless fans around the world. The song comes two days after her birthday, when she published a video thanking her fans for their support and talking about the song. It was directly made available to stream on multiple platforms. On November 8, she also released the lyric video on YouTube. Wurst proceeded to begin work on an album influenced by "mature ladies" like Cher, Shirley Bassey, and Tina Turner.

== Critical reception ==
"Heroes" received generally positive reviews. Fans and critics alike complimented the genre shift from "Rise Like a Phoenix" to "Heroes". Hollywood-News applauded the quality of "Heroes" while writing of Wetten, dass..?, "With great power also is the world premiere of 'Heroes', the new song by Conchita Wurst, expected: "I'm glad I can be there yet, so to speak before the last impressions, for I have seen the show as a child!" All Noise also applauded the song, "although 'Heroes' isn’t probably the best power ballad we have ever listened to, it is still a great track which has all the potential to find its place among chart-topping tracks. When you listen to this track you will feel the power and lift that you expect from Conchita Wurst’s music. The chorus makes it even more uplifting. Despite high-pitch delivery and bursts of energy, Conchita sings it so effortlessly that it naturally sounds brilliant."

== Music video ==
The official music video has been released for stream on YouTube on November 21. The video version is slightly different using more string instruments and heavier backing vocals. It deals mainly with war, self empowerment and love by using strong images.

== Charts ==
Chart (2014)	Peak position
Austria (Ö3 Austria Top 40)	4
Belgium (Ultratip Bubbling Under Flanders)	80
Belgium (Ultratip Bubbling Under Wallonia)	47

== Release history ==
Region	Date	Format	Label
Austria	8 November 2014	Digital download	ORF-Enterprise
Europe	8 November 2014	Digital download	ORF-Enterprise
United States	8 November 2014	Digital download	ORF-Enterprise
Various	8 November 2014	Digital download	ORF-Enterprise
