= Unbreakable (Conchita Wurst song) =

Single by Conchita Wurst
- Released: 22 November 2011
- Recorded: 2011
- Genre: Pop
- Length: 3:31
- Label: Sony Music Entertainment
- Songwriter(s): Roland Spremberg, Kit Hain

Conchita Wurst singles chronology
"I'll Be There" (2011)	"Unbreakable" (2011)	"That's What I Am" (2012)

"Unbreakable" is the debut single by Austrian singer Conchita Wurst. The song was released in Austria as a digital download on 22 November 2011 through Sony Music Entertainment. The song peaked at number 32 in Austria.

== Track listing ==
Digital download
No.	Title	Length
1.	"Unbreakable"	3:31

== Charts ==
Chart (2011)	Peak position
Austria (Ö3 Austria Top 40)	32

== Release history ==
Region	Date	Format	Label
Austria	22 November 2011	Digital download	Sony Music Entertainment
