= You Are Unstoppable =

Single by Conchita Wurst

from the album Conchita
- Released: 5 March 2015
- Recorded: 2014
- Genre: Electronic, baroque pop
- Length: 3:30
- Songwriters: Richard Andersson, Dag Lundberg, Nicklas Lif, Johannes Henriksson
- Producers: David Bronner, Sebastian Arman

Conchita Wurst singles chronology
"My Lights" (2014)	"You Are Unstoppable" (2015)	"Firestorm" / "Colours of Your Love" (2015)

"You Are Unstoppable" is a song by Austrian pop singer Conchita Wurst. The song was released as a single on 20 February 2015 on radio, and was included on her debut studio album released in May 2015. The song was made available on Amazon.com on 5 March and released as CD single on 6 March. It also served as the official anthem of the 2015 CONCACAF Gold Cup.

== Background and release ==
Musically, "You Are Unstoppable" combines orchestral elements of baroque pop with electropop elements.

The single was first premiered on radio on 20 February in Austria and first performed live on 5 March at Unser Song für Österreich, the German national final for the Eurovision Song Contest 2015.

Wurst devoted "You Are Unstoppable" to her fan base and used it as a statement for tolerance. Stating, "This song is for all the unstoppables. I devote this tune to everybody who shares the love and respect of their heart with the world." "You Are Unstoppable" deals with tolerance and the fight against discrimination.

== Track listing ==
Digital download

1. "You Are Unstoppable" – 3:30

Remixes – EP

1. "You Are Unstoppable" (Phunkstar Remix) – 6:39
2. "You Are Unstoppable" (Drums of Death Remix) – 5:43
3. "You Are Unstoppable" (7th Heaven Remix) – 7:35
4. "You Are Unstoppable" (LTBC Remix) – 5:17

== Charts ==
Chart (2015)	Peak position
Austria (Ö3 Austria Top 40)	13
Belgium (Ultratip Bubbling Under Flanders)	79
Germany (GfK)	67
Portugal (AFP Charts)	46
