= From Vienna with Love =

2018 studio album by Conchita Wurst and the Vienna Symphony

Studio album by Conchita Wurst and the Vienna Symphony
- Released: 19 October 2018
- Recorded: 2017
- Genre: Pop; classical
- Label: Sony Music Entertainment
- Producer: Dorothee Freiberger; David Bronner

Conchita Wurst chronology
Conchita (2015)	From Vienna with Love (2018)	Truth Over Magnitude (2019)

Singles from From Vienna with Love
- 1. "The Sound of Music" Released: 2018; 2. "Für mich soll's rote Rosen regnen" Released: 2018

From Vienna with Love is the second studio album by Austrian pop singer Conchita Wurst and the Vienna Symphony. It was released on 19 October 2018 by Sony Music Entertainment. The album peaked at number one on the Austrian Albums Chart.

== Background ==
Conchita and the Vienna Symphony performed together at the Vienna Festival in 2017. After the festival, they decided to team up again and record a joint album. The album includes beloved ballads and heartfelt songs symphonically arranged for the unique sound of the traditional Viennese orchestra conducted by Guido Mancusi. The album also includes a new version of her Eurovision Song Contest 2014 winning song, "Rise like a Phoenix". In an interview with Wiwibloggs, Wurst said "I'm over the moon, this really is a dream come true, that’s the soundtrack to my life. It's so overwhelming that I now have all of these songs that I have been singing for years and years on my own, in the shower or whatever, and now I'm performing them with an actual orchestra. It's a whole new experience. Listening to my music, and obviously for me performing my music, with an orchestra it's nerve-wracking. I have to be honest. So many people, and I get so nervous, and they are all depending on me. And they are all the best musicians you can get. I just want to live up to their standards. But I enjoy it so much. It's like a huge heart that is beating, this orchestra and it pulls you in and you can bathe in the sound".

== Track listing ==
No.	Title	Writer(s)	Producer	Length
1.	"Writing's on the Wall"	James Napier; Samuel Smith	Dorothee Freiberger	4:41
2.	"Have I Ever Been in Love"	Thomas Neuwirth; Emma Rohan; Steve Anderson	David Bronner	3:41
3.	"Colors of the Wind"	Alan Menken; Stephen Schwartz	Freiberger	4:06
4.	"The Sound of Music"	Oscar Hammerstein II; Richard Rodgers	Freiberger	2:50
5.	"Get Here"	Brenda Gordon Russell	Freiberger	4:40
6.	"Where Do I Begin"	Carl Sigman; Francis Albert Lai	Freiberger	3:23
7.	"All by Myself"	Eric Carmen; Sergei Rachmaninoff	Bronner	6:27
8.	"The Way We Were"	Alan Bergman; Marilyn Bergman; Marvin Hamlisch	Freiberger	3:33
9.	"Rise Like a Phoenix"	Alexander Zuckowski; Charlie Mason; Joey Patulka; Julian Maas	Bronner	4:34
10.	"Moonraker"	Hal David; John Barry	Freiberger	3:10
11.	"Uninvited"	Alanis Nadine Morissette	Freiberger	4:42
12.	"Für mich soll's rote Rosen regnen"	Hans Hammerschmid; Hildegard Knef	Freiberger	3:18

== Charts ==
=== Weekly charts ===
Chart (2018)	Peak position
Austrian Albums (Ö3 Austria)	1
German Albums (Offizielle Top 100)	77
Swiss Albums (Schweizer Hitparade)	84

=== Year-end charts ===
Chart (2018)	Position
Austrian Albums (Ö3 Austria)	33

== Certifications ==
Region	Certification	Certified units/sales
Austria (IFPI Austria)	Gold	7,500^{‡}
^{‡} Sales+streaming figures based on certification alone.

== Release history ==
Region	Date	Label	Format
Austria	19 October 2018	Sony Music Entertainment	CD, digital download
