= Only Teardrops =

2013 song by Emmelie de Forest

Single by Emmelie de Forest

from the album Only Teardrops
- Released: 22 January 2013
- Recorded: 2012
- Genre: Pop; folk; ethnopop
- Length: 3:03
- Label: Sony Music
- Songwriters: Lise Cabble; Julia Fabrin Jakobsen; Thomas Stengaard
- Producer: Frederik Thaae

Emmelie de Forest singles chronology
"Only Teardrops" (2013)	"Hunter & Prey" (2013)

Audio sample
- file; help

Music video
- "Only Teardrops" on YouTube

Eurovision Song Contest 2013 entry
- Country: Denmark
- Artist: Emmelie de Forest
- Language: English
- Composers: Lise Cabble; Julia Fabrin Jakobsen; Thomas Stengaard
- Lyricists: Lise Cabble; Julia Fabrin Jakobsen; Thomas Stengaard

Finals performance
- Semi-final result: 1st
- Semi-final points: 167
- Final result: 1st
- Final points: 281

Entry chronology
- ◄ "Should've Known Better" (2012)
- "Cliché Love Song" (2014) ►

Official performance video
- "Only Teardrops" (Semi-Final) on YouTube "Only Teardrops" (Final) on YouTube

"Only Teardrops" is a song recorded by Danish singer Emmelie de Forest, written by Lise Cabble, Julia Fabrin Jakobsen, and Thomas Stengaard, and produced by Frederik Thaae. It represented Denmark in the Eurovision Song Contest 2013 held in Malmö, resulting in the country's third win in the contest.

It was originally written to represent Germany in the contest, but was rejected.

== Background ==
=== Conception ===
"Only Teardrops" was written in 2012 by Lise Cabble, Julia Fabrin Jakobsen, and Thomas Stengaard, and produced by Frederik Thaae.

=== Eurovision ===
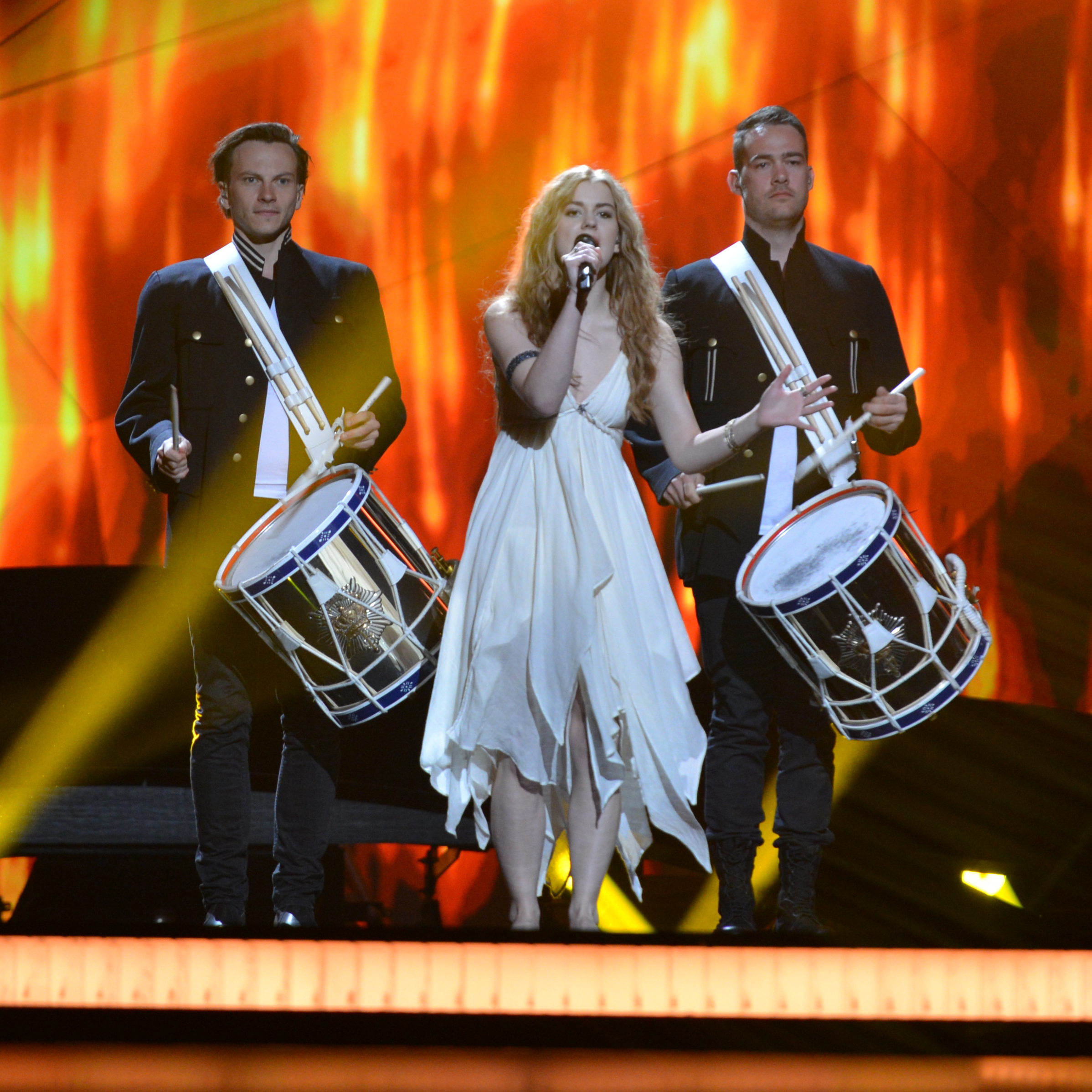
"Only Teardrops" at Eurovision

On 26 January 2013, "Only Teardrops" performed by Emmelie de Forest competed in the 43rd edition of the Dansk Melodi Grand Prix, winning the competition. During the performance, several musicians on stage were accidentally dressed in SS uniforms, due to a mix-up in DR's costume department where the costumes were also meant to be used in a historical drama. As the festival was used by the Danish Broadcasting Corporation (DR) to select its song and performer for the 58th edition of the Eurovision Song Contest, the song became the Danish entrant, and de Forest the performer, for Eurovision.

On 14 May 2013, the first semi-final of the Eurovision Song Contest was held in the Malmö Arena in Malmö hosted by Sveriges Television (SVT) and broadcast live throughout the continent. Emmelie de Forest performed "Only Teardrops" fifth on the evening. After the grand final it was revealed that it had received in its semi-final 167 points, placing first and qualifying for the grand final. On 18 May 2013, she performed the song again in the grand final eighteenth on the evening. At the close of voting, it had received 281 points finished in first place and winning the contest. It was Denmark's third win in the contest.

=== Aftermath ===
As the winning broadcaster, the European Broadcasting Union (EBU) gave DR the responsibility to host the following edition of the Eurovision Song Contest. De Forest opened the first semi-final on 6 May 2014 performing "Only Teardrops". On 31 March 2015, she performed the song in the Eurovision sixtieth anniversary show Eurovision Song Contest's Greatest Hits held in London.

== Track listing ==
- Digital download
1. "Only Teardrops" – 3:03
- CD single
1. "Only Teardrops" – 3:03
2. "Only Teardrops" (instrumental version) – 3:03
- Digital download – Kongsted remix
1. "Only Teardrops" (Kongsted remix) – 5:34
2. "Only Teardrops" (Kongsted remix radio edit) – 3:40

== Credits and personnel ==
- Lise Cabble – songwriter
- Julia Fabrin Jakobsen – first songwriter
- Thomas Stengaard – songwriter
- Frederik Thaae – producer, keyboards, guitar, drums, programming
- Emmelie de Forest – vocals
- Gunhild Overegseth – backing vocals
- Hans Find Møller – Tin whistle
- Tore Nissen – vocal production

Credits adapted from DR.

== Music video ==
De Forest posted several photographs onto her Facebook account from the shooting of the video. The video is directed by Michael Sauer Christensen. It has been filmed in the forest and on the beach. It was released on 13 June 2013, in DR's official website.

== Commercial performance ==
The song was an instant hit in de Forest's home country of Denmark, where it debuted and peaked at number two on the Danish Singles Chart upon its release. Following its victory in Eurovision, the song re-entered the singles chart at number one. It has since been certified gold by IFPI Denmark for sales of 15,000 digital copies. It was the fourteenth best-selling digital single in Denmark in 2013.

In the United Kingdom, "Only Teardrops" debuted at number 99, despite Eurovision airing only four hours before the cut-off point for the chart. A week later, the single rose to a high of No. 15 in the UK. In its third week, it dropped to No. 84 and dropped out of the chart the following week after 3 weeks on British chart. According to The Official Charts Company, "Only Teardrops" is the seventh most downloaded Eurovision song to date in the United Kingdom.

=== Weekly charts ===
Chart (2013)	Peak positions
Australia (ARIA)	47
Austria (Ö3 Austria Top 40)	7
Belgium (Ultratop 50 Flanders)	11
Belgium (Ultratop 50 Wallonia)	26
Brazil (Antena)	2
CIS Airplay (TopHit)	105
Denmark (Tracklisten)	1
Euro Digital Songs (Billboard)	8
Finland (Suomen virallinen lista)	17
Finland (The Official Finnish Download Chart)	1
France (SNEP)	78
Germany (GfK)	5
Greece Digital Songs (Billboard)	1
Iceland (RÚV)	1
Ireland (IRMA)	5
Italy (FIMI)	81
Luxembourg Digital Song Sales (Billboard)	4
Netherlands (Dutch Top 40)	14
Netherlands (Single Top 100)	4
Norway (VG-lista)	9
Scotland Singles (OCC)	14
Slovakia Airplay (ČNS IFPI)	14
Slovenia (SloTop50)	29
Spain (PROMUSICAE)	8
Sweden (Sverigetopplistan)	3
Sweden (DigiListan)	1
Switzerland (Schweizer Hitparade)	3
Turkey (Number One Charts)	11
Ukraine Airplay (TopHit)	8
UK Singles (OCC)	15

=== Year-end charts ===
Chart (2013)	Position
Brazil (Antena 1 Radio)	18
Denmark (Tracklisten)	14
Germany (Official German Charts)	77
Netherlands (Dutch Top 40)	101
Sweden (Sverigetopplistan)	79
Ukraine Airplay (TopHit)	54

=== Certifications ===
Region	Certification	Certified units/sales
Denmark (IFPI Danmark)	Platinum	30,000^{^}
Denmark (IFPI Danmark)	Platinum	1,800,000^{†}
Germany (BVMI)	Gold	150,000^{‡}
^{^} Shipments figures based on certification alone.^{‡} Sales+streaming figures based on certification alone.^{†} Streaming-only figures based on certification alone.

== Release history ==
Region	Date	Format	Label
Denmark	22 January 2013	Digital download	Sony Music
Worldwide	2 May 2013	Digital download	Sony Music
Austria	14 June 2013	CD single	Sony Music
Germany	14 June 2013	CD single	Sony Music
Switzerland	14 June 2013	CD single	Sony Music
Worldwide	24 June 2013	Digital download – Kongsted remix	Sony Music

Preceded by "Euphoria" by Loreen	Eurovision Song Contest winners 2013	Succeeded by "Rise Like a Phoenix" by Conchita Wurst
