= Emmelie de Forest =

Danish singer

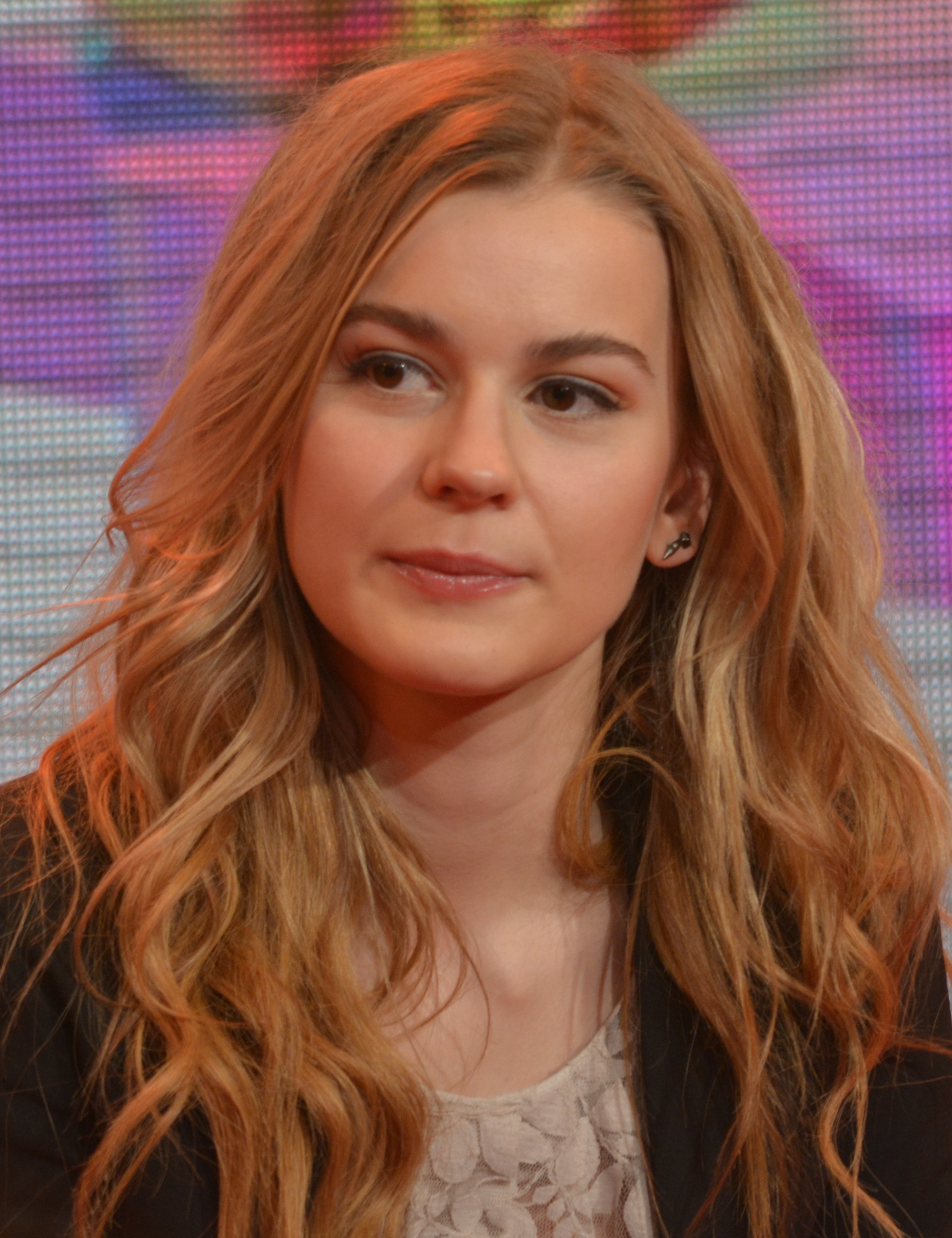
- De Forest in 2013

Background information
- Born: Emmelie Charlotte-Victoria de Forest; 28 February 1993 (age 33); Randers, Denmark
- Origin: Mariager, Denmark
- Genres: Pop; folk
- Occupations: Singer; songwriter
- Instruments: Vocals
- Years active: 2013–present
- Labels: UMG; Cosmos Music

Emmelie Charlotte-Victoria de Forest (born 28 February 1993) is a Danish-Swedish singer and songwriter. She represented Denmark in the Eurovision Song Contest 2013 with the song "Only Teardrops" and went on to win the competition.

== Personal life ==
De Forest was born in Randers, Denmark, to a Danish mother, Marianna Birgitte Gudnitz and a Swedish father, Ingvar de Forest (1938–2010). Following her parents' divorce when she was young, she grew up with her mother in Mariager, Denmark, and in Stockholm, Sweden. She had previously claimed that she was a great granddaughter of Edward VII of the United Kingdom (and thus a great-great-granddaughter of Victoria of the United Kingdom and Albert, Prince Consort). DR used the story of her claim to royal ancestry in its promotion of the Dansk Melodi Grand Prix, although the claim has been discredited by researchers.

== Music career ==
=== Early career ===
De Forest began singing at the age of nine and sang with her mother in the Steve Cameron Gospel Choir for several years. From the age of 14, she began performing at music festivals and small venues with Scottish folk musician Fraser Neill. According to Neill, they made an album together titled Emmelié de Forest and Fraser Neill that sold only 100 copies. When de Forest was 18 years old, she ended her collaboration with Neill and moved to Copenhagen to study at the Complete Vocal Institute.

=== 2013: Eurovision Song Contest and Only Teardrops ===
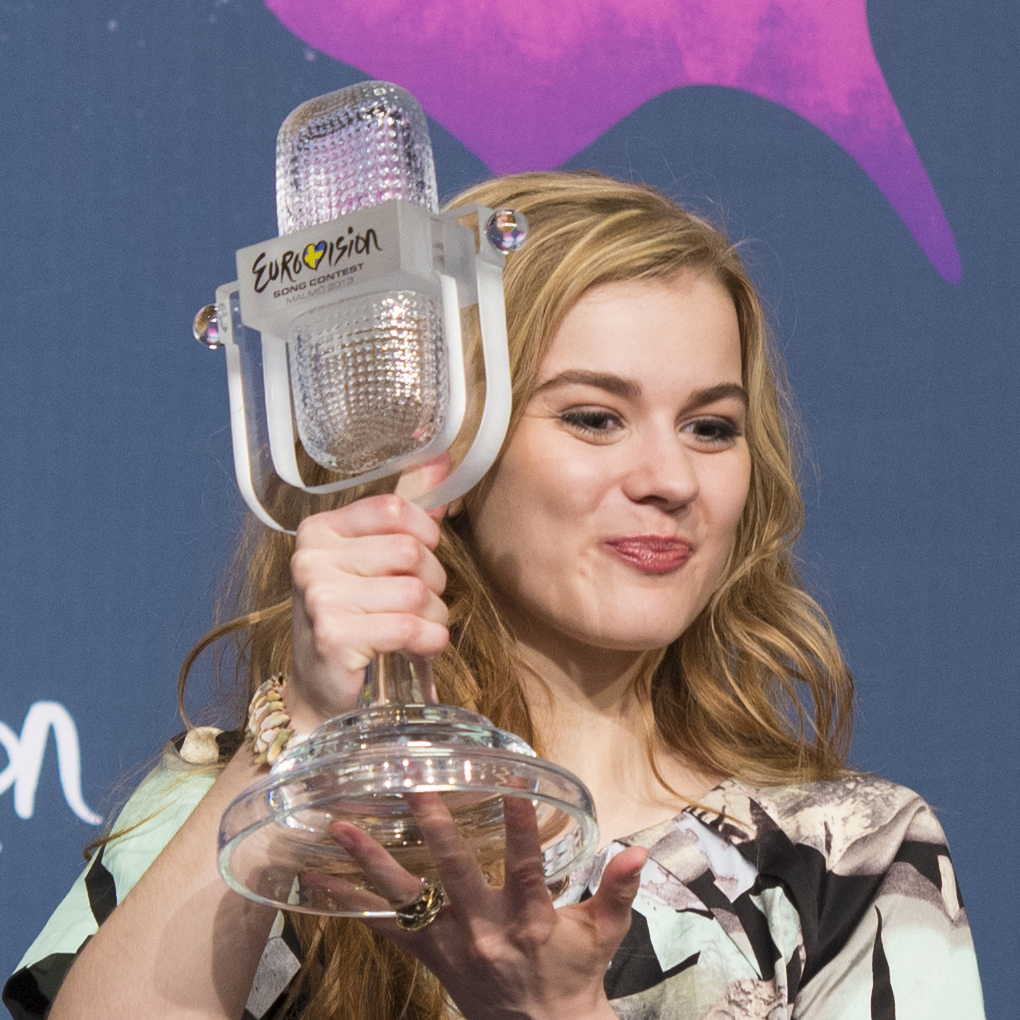
De Forest at the Eurovision 2013 winner's press conference

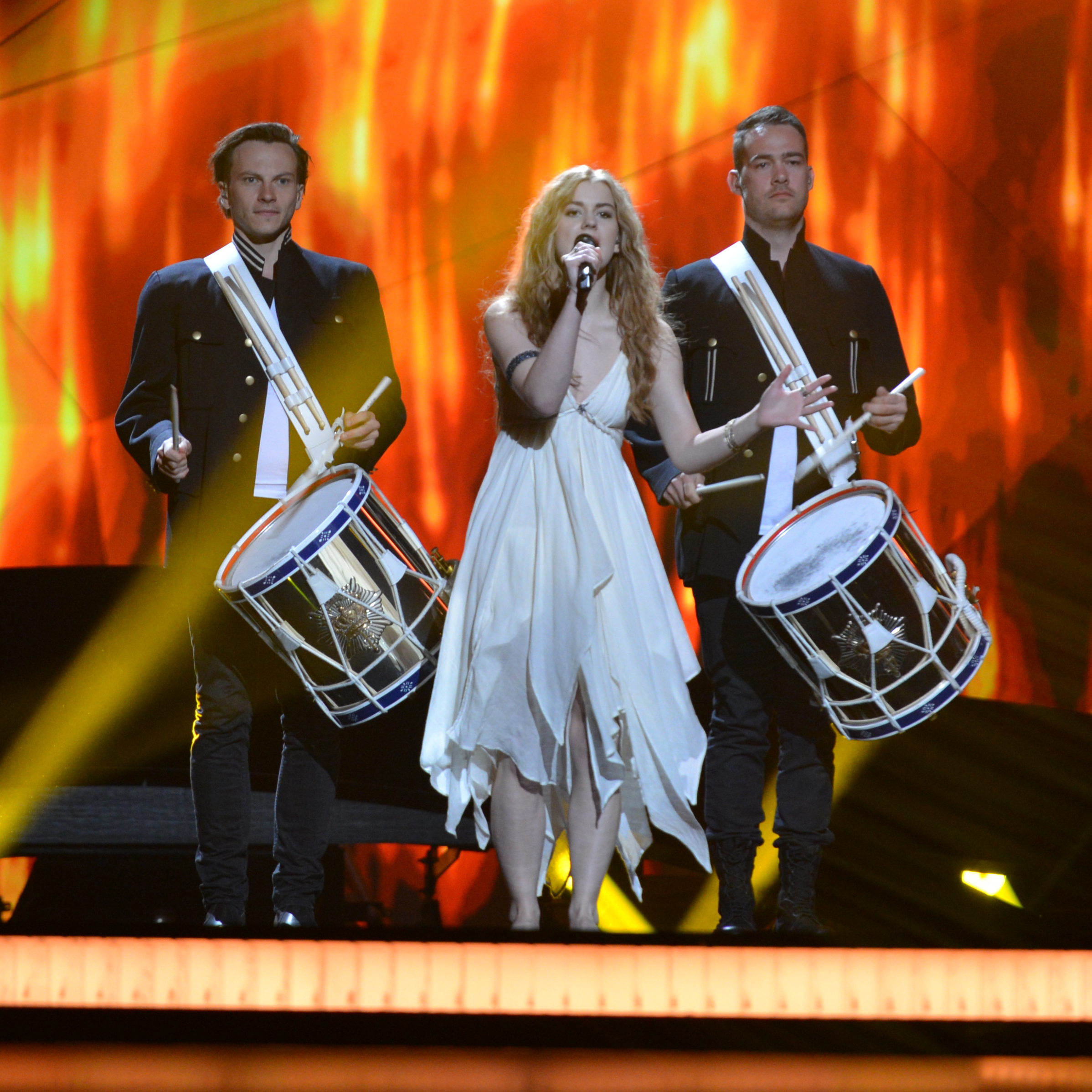
De Forest performing in Malmö

De Forest was one of ten acts that performed in the 2013 Dansk Melodi Grand Prix for a chance to represent Denmark at the Eurovision Song Contest 2013 in Malmö, Sweden. On 26 January 2013, she performed the song "Only Teardrops" (written by Lise Cabble, Julia Fabrin Jakobsen and Thomas Stengaard) and won the national selection.

Her debut album, Only Teardrops, was released on 6 May, a week before her performance in the Eurovision contest. The album has twelve tracks, including the original and symphonic versions of "Only Teardrops."

On 14 May, de Forest reached the final of the Eurovision, being one of the ten finalists that qualified from the first semi-final. According to British bookmakers, de Forest was the odds on favourite to win the contest. De Forest won the 2013 Eurovision final on 18 May with a total of 281 points, 47 points more than second-place finisher Farid Mammadov of Azerbaijan.

She performed her Eurovision winning entry at the Junior Eurovision Song Contest 2013 in Kyiv, Ukraine on 30 November. In December it was revealed that de Forest had been awarded the European of the Year Award (Danish: Årets Europæer Award) by the Danish European Movement.

=== 2014–present: Label change and History ===
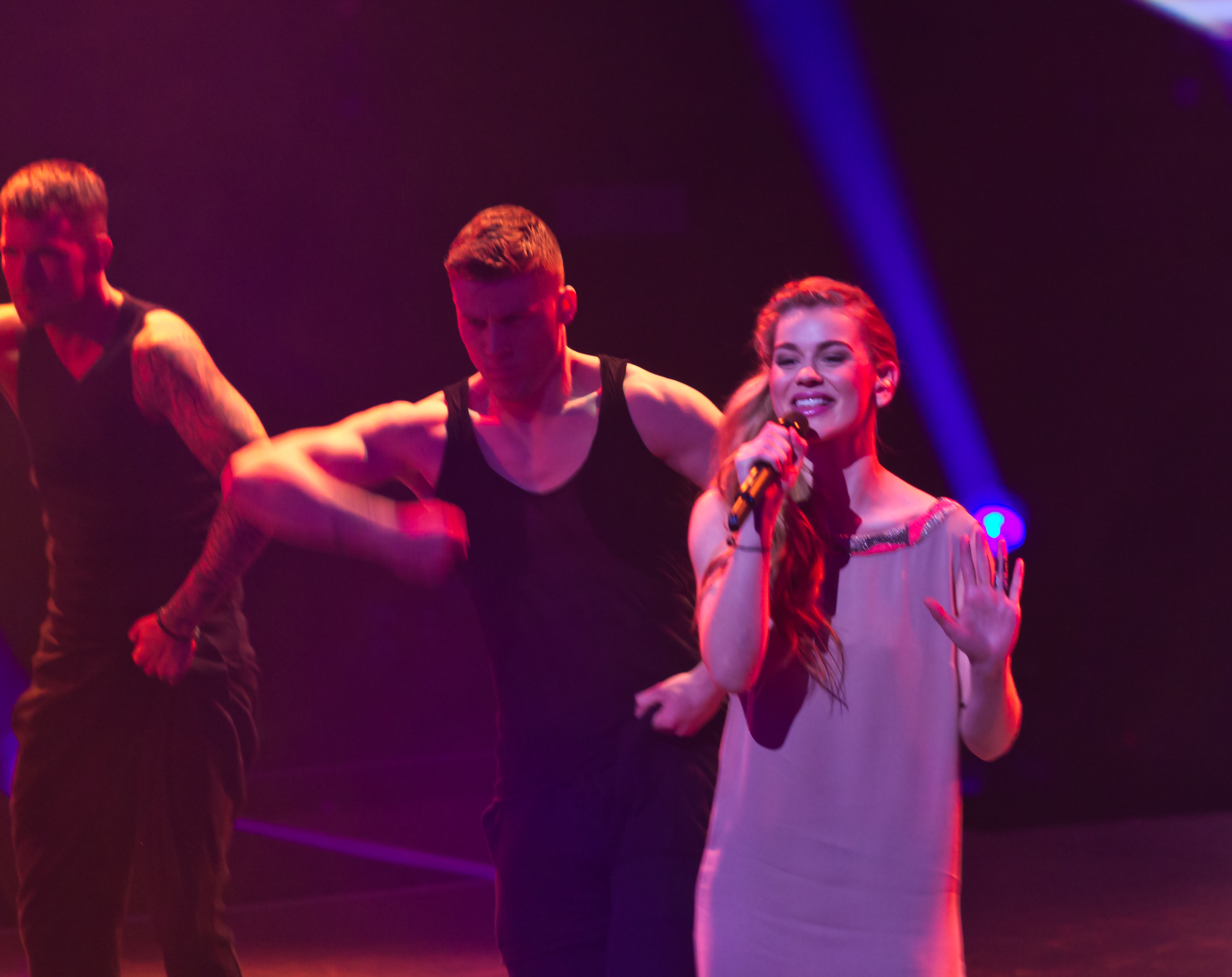
De Forest performing at Unser Song für Dänemark

On 7 February 2014, de Forest uploaded a video that spoke about her third single "Rainmaker", explained the meaning of the song, and previewed it. It was the official #JoinUs song for the Eurovision Song Contest 2014 and she performed the song live during the final at the B&W Hallerne, in Copenhagen. Talking about the song, de Forest said "It is about a tribe joining together to call upon the rainmaker to make their land blossom again. But on a more general level the rainmaker can be anything or anyone – it is about coming together and helping each other out". She also talked about enjoying success after winning Eurovision last year, "I've been performing my music around Europe, released my debut album and written a lot of new songs – to be honest, I'm living my dream!".

In a Wiwibloggs interview in September 2014, de Forest said she was recording her second studio album, which was originally due to be released in February 2015. On 14 July, de Forest announced that "Rainmaker" was certified Gold. On 3 August 2014, de Forest announced via Facebook that she would perform the first single of her yet untitled album, "Drunk Tonight" at Amsterdam Pride 2014. Via Instagram, de Forest unveiled the cover and snippets of "Drunk Tonight", as well as its music video preview. The single was later released on 18 August, while the music video for the song was released on 25 August. De Forest, who appears nude in the video, has said in interviews that she wanted it to be "elegant and sexy" at the same time.

In December 2015, she left her record label Universal Music Group, and later signed with Swedish record company Cosmos Music. De Forest participated in Dansk Melodi Grand Prix 2016 as a songwriter of the song "Never Alone" performed by Anja Nissen. However, it risked disqualification as de Forest had performed the song several times prior to it competing in the competition. It was ultimately approved by the European Broadcasting Union, which organises the Eurovision Song Contest. The song competed in the final on 13 February 2016, where it advanced to the super final and ended in second place.

De Forest later participated in the British national selection for the Eurovision Song Contest 2017 as a songwriter for the song "Never Give Up on You" performed by Lucie Jones. The song went on to win the competition, and later placed 15th at the Eurovision Song Contest in Kyiv. De Forest went on to release the single "Sanctuary" in November 2017, her first release since her split from Universal. Her second studio album History was released on 9 February 2018. Under the independent label Day in Day Out Records, a division of Cosmos Music, De Forest released the single "Typical Love Song" on 8 October 2021.

== Discography ==
- Only Teardrops (2013)
- History (2018)
- Into the Moon (2025)

Awards and achievements
Preceded by Soluna Samay with "Should've Known Better"	Denmark in the Eurovision Song Contest; 2013	Succeeded by Basim with "Cliche Love Song"
Preceded by (Sweden) Loreen with "Euphoria"	Winner of the Eurovision Song Contest; 2013	Succeeded by (Austria) Conchita Wurst with "Rise Like a Phoenix"
Preceded by (Germany) Günter Grass	European of the Year (by the Danish European Movement); 2013	Succeeded by (Denmark) Connie Hedegaard
