= Rainmaker (Emmelie de Forest song) =

Single by Emmelie de Forest

from the album Eurovision Song Contest: Copenhagen 2014
- Released: 21 February 2014
- Recorded: 2013
- Genre: Pop, Worldbeat, Folk Pop
- Length: 3:43:00
- Label: Universal
- Songwriter(s): Emmelie de Forest; Jakob Schack Glæsner; Fredrik Sonefors

Emmelie de Forest singles chronology
"Hunter & Prey" (2013)	"Rainmaker" (2014)	"Drunk Tonight" (2014)

"Rainmaker" is a single by Danish singer-songwriter Emmelie de Forest. The song was released in Denmark on 21 February 2014. It is the official song for the Eurovision Song Contest 2014. The song was written by Emmelie de Forest, Jakob Schack Glæsner, Fredrik Sonefors. The song has peaked at number seven on the Danish Singles Chart, as well as becoming her second top 75 single on the UK Singles Chart.

== Background ==
Talking about the song Emmelie said, "It is about a tribe joining together to call upon the rainmaker to make their land blossom again. But on a more general level the rainmaker can be anything or anyone – it is about coming together and helping each other out".

== Live performances ==
Emmelie sang the song live during the Maltese national final, the German national final, the Andra Chansen round of the Melodifestivalen in Lidköping and Dansk Melodi Grand Prix 2014.

On 10 May 2014 Emmelie performed the song with the 26 finalists live during the final of Eurovision Song Contest 2014, at the B&W Hallerne, in Copenhagen, Denmark.

== Track listing ==
Digital download
No.	Title	Length
1.	"Rainmaker"	3:43

Digital download — remix
No.	Title	Length
1.	"Rainmaker" (Sidelmann remix)	4:58

== Weekly charts ==
Chart (2014)	Peak position
Denmark (Tracklisten)	1
Germany (GfK)	58
Ireland (IRMA)	65
Sweden (Digilistan)	23
UK Singles (OCC)	73
Switzerland (Schweizer Hitparade)	74

== Release history ==
Region	Date	Format	Label
Europe	21 February 2014	Digital download	Universal Music
Europe	21 February 2014	Digital download — remix	Universal Music

== See also ==
- Eurovision Song Contest 2014
