= Heast as net =

"Heast as net" is a song by Austrian singer and songwriter Hubert Achleitner (better known by his stage name Hubert von Goisern) and Wolfgang Staribacher, performed by Hubert von Goisern and the Neue Volksmusik band Die Original Alpinkatzen, released on the 1992 album Aufgeigen stått niederschiassen. It was also released as a single.

In 2017 a cover performed by the Austrian singers Conchita Wurst and Ina Regen was released as a digital download on 15 December 2017 through Sony Music Entertainment and peaked at number 36 on the Austrian Singles Chart.

== Conchita Wurst version ==
"Heast as net"

Single by Conchita Wurst and Ina Regen
- Released: 15 December 2017
- Recorded: 2017
- Genre: Pop
- Length: 4:22
- Label: Sony Music Entertainment
- Songwriter(s): Hubert von Goisern; Wolfgang Staribacher

Conchita Wurst singles chronology
"Firestorm" / "Colours of Your Love" (2015)	"Heast as net" (2017)	"The Sound of Music" (2018)

=== Music video ===
An official music video to accompany the release of "Heast as net" was first released onto YouTube on 30 November 2017 at a total length of four minutes and twenty-five seconds.

=== Track listing ===
Digital download
No.	Title	Length
1.	"Heast as net"	4:22

=== Charts ===
Chart (2018)	Peak position
Austria (Ö3 Austria Top 40)	36

=== Release history ===
Region	Date	Format	Label
Austria	15 December 2017	Digital download	Sony Music Entertainment
