= Truth Over Magnitude =

2019 studio album by Conchita Wurst

Studio album by Conchita Wurst
- Released: 25 October 2019
- Recorded: 2018
- Length: 46:00
- Label: Sony Music

Conchita Wurst chronology
From Vienna with Love (2018)	Truth Over Magnitude (2019)

Singles from Truth Over Magnitude
- 1. "Trash All the Glam" Released: 8 March 2019; 2. "Hit Me" Released: 15 March 2019; 3. "See Me Now" Released: 12 April 2019; 4. "To the Beat" Released: 24 May 2019; 5. "Forward" Released: 7 June 2019; 6. "Under the Gun" Released: 17 October 2019

Truth Over Magnitude is the third studio album by Austrian pop singer Conchita Wurst. It was released on 25 October 2019 by Sony Music Entertainment. The album includes the singles "Trash All the Glam", "Hit Me", "See Me Now", "To the Beat", "Forward" and "Under the Gun".

== Critical reception ==
Jonathan Vautrey of Wiwibloggs, gave the album a positive review stating, "Musically, there's a reservedness and quietness running throughout the twelve-track LP. There's no extremely upbeat song or big soaring power ballad where Wurst tries to make an over-produced statement. Rather, Truth Over Magnitude subtly delivers a message of self-love and respect. Wurst's new LP may not be everyone's musical cup of tea. But, the Eurovision alum is not here to make a big splash and release records that try to appeal to the masses. Instead, Tom Neuwirth favours truth over magnitude, and humbly bares the current state of his soul through T.O.M." Luke Malam of ESCXtra also gave the album a positive review, stating, "This new album from Wurst features a more electronic sound than the releases of Conchita and may come as a surprise to some. The story behind the album is one of evolution, and of Tom's journey changing from the Conchita we first saw in 2011 (as part of ORF's Die große Chance) to the Wurst we see today! The album is a huge statement, Wurst is doing what he wants and what he finds fun, regardless of what others may think. Forget Conchita, and 'See Me Now' as he says, for the artist that he has become!"

== Track listing ==
All tracks are written by Eva Klampfer ("Lylit") and Albin Janoska.

Truth Over Magnitude track listing
No.	Title	Length
1.	"Trash All the Glam"	4:19
2.	"Satori"	3:44
3.	"To the Beat"	3:46
4.	"Can't Come Back"	3:01
5.	"Hit Me"	3:38
6.	"See Me Now"	3:20
7.	"Resign"	5:32
8.	"Under the Gun"	3:26
9.	"Kuku"	3:20
10.	"Forward"	3:39
11.	"Six"	3:50
12.	"Truth Over Magnitude"	4:04
Total length:		46:00

== Charts ==
Chart performance for Truth Over Magnitude
Chart (2019)	Peak position
Austrian Albums (Ö3 Austria)	3
