= Rise Like a Phoenix =

2014 song by Conchita Wurst

Single by Conchita Wurst

from the album Conchita
- Released: 18 March 2014
- Recorded: 2013
- Genre: Operatic pop
- Length: 3:01
- Label: ORF-Enterprise
- Songwriters: Charlie Mason; Joey Patulka; Ali Zuckowski; Julian Maas

Conchita Wurst singles chronology
| "That's What I Am" (2012) | "Rise Like a Phoenix" (2014) | "Heroes" (2014) |

Music video
- "Rise Like a Phoenix" on YouTube

Eurovision Song Contest 2014 entry
- Country: Austria
- Artist: Thomas Neuwirth
- As: Conchita Wurst
- Language: English
- Composers: Joey Patulka; Alexander Zuckowski; Julian Maas; Charlie Mason
- Lyricists: Joey Patulka; Alexander Zuckowski; Julian Maas; Charlie Mason

Finals performance
- Semi-final result: 1st
- Semi-final points: 169
- Final result: 1st
- Final points: 290

Entry chronology
- ◄ "Shine" (2013)
- "I Am Yours" (2015) ►

Song presentation
- file; help

Official performance video
- "Rise Like a Phoenix" (Semi-2) on YouTube "Rise Like a Phoenix" (Final) on YouTube "Rise Like a Phoenix" (Reprise) on YouTube

"Rise Like a Phoenix" is a song recorded by Austrian singer Conchita Wurst, written by Joey Patulka, Alexander Zuckowski, Julian Maas, and Charlie Mason. It represented Austria in the Eurovision Song Contest 2014 held in Copenhagen, resulting in the country's second win in the contest.

== Background ==
=== Conception and selection ===
Composer Alexander Zuckowski had originally composed the song for another project, however, every major record label in Austria had refused to produce "Rise Like a Phoenix". Following a request from Österreichischer Rundfunk (ORF) about possible song contributions, Zuckowski immediately thought of suggesting "Rise Like a Phoenix", reasoning, "I knew that with this song still something great was going to happen". It was entered into the ORF internal selection process for Eurovision.

On 10 September 2013, ORF announced that it had internally selected singer Conchita Wurst as its performer for the 59th edition of the Eurovision Song Contest. On 18 March 2014, ORF announced "Rise Like a Phoenix" as the Austrian entrant for the contest.

=== Release ===
The song was released by the ORF on 18 March 2014. The accompanying music video was premiered on YouTube on the same day, while the song was offered on the ORF website for download. On 21 March, Wurst made the first live performances of the song, on the ORF show Dancing Stars.

=== Eurovision ===
On 8 May 2014, the second semi-final of the Eurovision Song Contest was held in B&W Hallerne in Copenhagen hosted by the Danish Broadcasting Corporation (DR) and broadcast live throughout the continent. Wurst performed "Rise Like a Phoenix" sixth on the evening. After the grand final it was revealed that it had received in its semi-final 169 points, placing first and qualifying for the grand final. On 10 May 2014, she performed the song again in the grand final eleventh on the evening. At the close of voting, it had received 290 points finished in first place and winning the contest. It was Austria's second win in the contest, its first being in 1966.

=== Aftermath ===
On 31 March 2015, Wurst performed the song in the Eurovision sixtieth anniversary show Eurovision Song Contest's Greatest Hits held in London.

As the winning broadcaster, the European Broadcasting Union (EBU) gave ORF the responsibility to host the following edition of the Eurovision Song Contest. The contest was co-hosted by Wurst herself, who opened the first semi-final on 19 May 2015 performing "Rise Like a Phoenix".

== Critical reception ==
Stern gave the song a rating of four out of five. 1966 Austrian winner Udo Jürgens said the song was "a well-composed song with a beautiful musical bow", and as the lyrics suggest, "rises from the ashes".

== Track listing ==
Digital download
| No. | Title | Length |
|---|---|---|
| 1. | "Rise Like a Phoenix" | 3:01 |

== Release history ==
| Region | Date | Format | Label |
|---|---|---|---|
| Austria | 18 March 2014 | Digital download | ORF-Enterprise |
| Europe | 18 March 2014 | Digital download | ORF-Enterprise |
| United States | 18 March 2014 | Digital download | ORF-Enterprise |
| United Kingdom | 11 May 2014 | Digital download | ORF-Enterprise |

== Charts history ==
=== Weekly charts ===
| Chart (2014) | Peak position |
|---|---|
| Austria (Ö3 Austria Top 40) | 1 |
| Belgium (Ultratop 50 Flanders) | 8 |
| Belgium (Ultratop 50 Wallonia) | 19 |
| Denmark (Tracklisten) | 6 |
| Euro Digital Songs (Billboard) | 13 |
| Finland Download (Latauslista) | 2 |
| France (SNEP) | 39 |
| Germany (GfK) | 5 |
| Hungary (Single Top 40) | 9 |
| Iceland (RÚV) | 8 |
| Ireland (IRMA) | 10 |
| Italy (FIMI) | 26 |
| Luxembourg Digital Songs (Billboard) | 2 |
| Netherlands (Dutch Top 40 Tipparade) | 10 |
| Netherlands (Single Top 100) | 3 |
| Scotland Singles (OCC) | 18 |
| Slovenia (SloTop50) | 13 |
| Spain (Promusicae) | 8 |
| Sweden (Sverigetopplistan) | 27 |
| Switzerland (Schweizer Hitparade) | 2 |
| UK Singles (OCC) | 17 |
| UK Indie (OCC) | 1 |

=== Year-end charts ===
| Chart (2014) | Position |
|---|---|
| Austria (Ö3 Austria Top 40) | 19 |

=== Certifications ===
| Region | Certification | Certified units/sales |
|---|---|---|
| Austria (IFPI Austria) | Platinum | 30,000^{*} |
^{*} Sales figures based on certification alone.

| Preceded by "Only Teardrops" by Emmelie de Forest | Eurovision Song Contest winners 2014 | Succeeded by "Heroes" by Måns Zelmerlöw |
