= Conchita (album) =

2015 studio album by Conchita Wurst

Studio album by Conchita Wurst
- Released: 15 May 2015
- Recorded: 2013–2015
- Studio: dB Music (Vienna) · RedP Studios (Vienna) · Tom Tom Studios · Die Fleischerei · Resonate Studios (Los Angeles) · Tinseltown · BMC (Budapest) · Le Pressage · Studio 22
- Genre: Pop; baroque pop; synthpop
- Length: 43:00
- Label: Sony Music

Conchita Wurst chronology
| Conchita (2015) | From Vienna with Love (2018) |

Singles from Conchita
- 1. "Rise like a Phoenix" Released: 18 March 2014; 2. "Heroes" Released: 8 November 2014; 3. "You Are Unstoppable" Released: 5 March 2015; 4. "Firestorm" / "Colours of Your Love" Released: 7 August 2015

Conchita is the debut studio album by Austrian pop singer Conchita Wurst. It was released on 15 May 2015 by Sony Music Entertainment. The album includes the singles "Heroes", "You Are Unstoppable" and her Eurovision Song Contest 2014 winning song, "Rise like a Phoenix".

== Composition ==
Conchita incorporates different elements from multiple music genres into Conchita Wurst's typical baroque pop sound. Several electronic genres can be found on Conchita with influences from dubstep to house in general on "Out of Body Experience" and "Somebody to Love". For example, "You Are Unstoppable" and "Up for Air" draw heavily from electropop while fourth single "Colours of Your Love" includes club music in its composition. With "Firestorm" Wurst links house to Europop.

== Singles ==
"Rise like a Phoenix", Wurst's winning entry at the Eurovision Song Contest 2014, was the first single to be released off the album on 18 March 2014. "Heroes" was the second single from the album released on 8 November 2014. "You Are Unstoppable" was released as the third single from the album on 5 March 2015. On 7 August 2015, "Firestorm"/"Colours of Your Love" was released as a double A-side and the fourth single.

== Critical reception ==
In an early review of the album, Luis Gonzalez of Album Confessions wrote, "With a solid blend of pop, dance and opera, the artist's inspiring way with words creates powerful, impressive and soaring numbers that should bring a smile to any listener's face. Isn't that what pop music should do? Cause a smile? Wurst may use the persona of 'the bearded lady' to stand out from the crowd, but she really doesn't need it. Her beautiful performances across the album do all the talking."

== Track listing ==
| No. | Title | Writer(s) | Producer(s) | Length |
|---|---|---|---|---|
| 1. | "You Are Unstoppable" | Richard Andersson; Dag Lundberg; Nicklas Lif; Johannes Henriksson | Sebastian Arman; David Bronner | 3:30 |
| 2. | "Up for Air" | Arman; Bronner; David Malin; Joacim Persson | Arman | 3:48 |
| 3. | "Put That Fire Out" | Erik Anjou | Bronner; Bader | 3:42 |
| 4. | "Colours of Your Love" | Cyndi Almouzni; Arman; Bronner; Persson | Arman; Persson | 3:34 |
| 5. | "Out of Body Experience" | Bronner; Marcus Brosch; Duncan Townsend; Tobias Neumann; Neele Ternes | Bronner; Oliver Pum | 3:41 |
| 6. | "Where Have All the Good Men Gone" | Lucinda Belle; Gil Cang | Bronner; Bader | 3:09 |
| 7. | "Somebody to Love" | Arman; Lundberg; Lif; Persson | Arman; Lundberg; Lif; Persson | 4:10 |
| 8. | "Firestorm" | Aleena Gibson; Arman; Persson | Arman | 3:43 |
| 9. | "Pure" | Midge Ure; Martin Fliegenschmidt; Claudio Pagonis; Valentine Romanski | Fliegenschmidt; Pagonis | 3:58 |
| 10. | "Heroes" | Tom Neuwirth; Andreas Kleerup; Arman; Bronner; Persson | Arman; Persson | 3:43 |
| 11. | "Rise like a Phoenix" | Charlie Mason; Alexander Zuckowski; Joey Patulka; Julian Maas; Robin Grubert | Arman; Bronner; Doro Badent | 3:04 |
| 12. | "The Other Side of Me" | Anjou | Anjou; Bronner | 3:41 |
| Total length: | | | | 43:47 |

iTunes bonus features
| No. | Title | Writer(s) | Producer(s) | Length |
|---|---|---|---|---|
| 13. | "You Are Unstoppable" (Dynasty Rework) | Andersson; Lundberg; Lif; Henriksson | Arman; Bronner | 3:26 |
| 14. | "Heroes" (Video) | Neuwirth; Kleerup; Arman; Bronner; Persson | Arman; Persson | 3:42 |
| Total length: | | | | 50:56 |

== Charts ==
=== Weekly charts ===
| Chart (2015) | Peak position |
|---|---|
| Australian Albums (ARIA) | 26 |
| Austrian Albums (Ö3 Austria) | 1 |
| Belgian Albums (Ultratop Flanders) | 17 |
| Belgian Albums (Ultratop Wallonia) | 41 |
| Dutch Albums (Album Top 100) | 67 |
| Finnish Albums (Suomen virallinen lista) | 28 |
| French Albums (SNEP) | 138 |
| German Albums (Offizielle Top 100) | 23 |
| Italian Albums (FIMI) | 30 |
| South Korean Albums (Gaon Chart) | 96 |
| Spanish Albums (PROMUSICAE) | 48 |
| Swiss Albums (Schweizer Hitparade) | 6 |
| UK Albums (OCC) | 123 |

=== Year-end charts ===
| Chart (2015) | Position |
|---|---|
| Austrian Albums (Ö3 Austria) | 23 |

== Certifications ==
| Region | Certification | Certified units/sales |
|---|---|---|
| Austria (IFPI Austria) | Platinum | 15,000^{*} |
^{*} Sales figures based on certification alone.

== Release history ==
| Region | Date | Label | Format |
|---|---|---|---|
| Australia | 15 May 2015 | Sony Music Entertainment | CD, digital download |
| Austria | 15 May 2015 | Sony Music Entertainment | CD, digital download |
| Germany | 15 May 2015 | Sony Music Entertainment | CD, digital download |
| Netherlands | 15 May 2015 | Sony Music Entertainment | CD, digital download |
| United States | 15 May 2015 | Sony Music Entertainment | CD, digital download |
| United Kingdom | 18 May 2015 | Sony Music Entertainment | CD, digital download |
| Canada | 19 May 2015 | Sony Music Entertainment | CD, digital download |
| Italy | 19 May 2015 | Sony Music Entertainment | CD, digital download |
