= Firestorm (song) =

Single by Conchita Wurst

from the album Conchita
- Released: 7 August 2015
- Recorded: 2014
- Genre: Eurodance; future house
- Length: 3:43
- Songwriter(s): Aleena Gibson; Sebastian Arman; Joacim Persson
- Producer(s): Sebastian Arman

Conchita Wurst singles chronology
"You Are Unstoppable" (2015)	"Firestorm" / "Colours of Your Love" (2015)	"Heast as net" (2017)

"Firestorm" is a song recorded by Austrian singer Conchita Wurst for her debut album, Conchita (2015). It was released as an A-side single along with "Colours of Your Love" on 7 August 2015.

== Live performances ==
The live premiere of the song was on the Lifeball 2015. Wurst performed the song on 23 May 2015 on Eurovision Song Contest 2015, and on 26 May 2015, on Euro Fan Café.

== Track listing ==
Digital download

1. "Firestorm" - 3:43
2. "Colours of Your Love" – 3:34

== Charts ==
Chart (2015)	Peak position
Austria (Ö3 Austria Top 40)	45
