= Colours of Your Love =

Single by Conchita Wurst

from the album Conchita
- Released: 7 August 2015
- Recorded: 2014
- Genre: Pop; electronic
- Length: 3:34
- Songwriter(s): Cyndi Almouzni; David Bronner; Sebastian Arman; Joacim Persson
- Producer(s): Sebastian Arman; Joacim Persson

Conchita Wurst singles chronology
"You Are Unstoppable" (2015)	"Firestorm" / "Colours of Your Love" (2015)	"Heast as net" (2017)

"Colours of Your Love" is a song recorded by Austrian singer Conchita Wurst for her debut album, Conchita (2015). It was released as a double A-side single along with "Firestorm" on 7 August 2015.

== Track listing ==
Digital download

1. "Firestorm" – 3:43
2. "Colours of Your Love" – 3:34

== Charts ==
Chart (2015)	Peak position
Austria (Ö3 Austria Top 40)	45
