= Only Teardrops (album) =

Studio album by Emmelie de Forest
- Released: 6 May 2013
- Recorded: 2012, April 2013
- Genre: Pop, folk
- Length: 40:18
- Label: Universal Music Denmark
- Producer: Anders Fredslund-Hansen

Emmelie de Forest chronology
Only Teardrops (2013)	Acoustic Session (2014)

Singles from Only Teardrops
- 1. "Only Teardrops" Released: 22 January 2013; 2. "Hunter & Prey" Released: 19 August 2013

Only Teardrops is the debut album of the Danish singer-songwriter Emmelie de Forest. The album was released on 6 May 2013 on Universal Music. In late March she signed a contract with Universal Music. The song of the same name won the Eurovision Song Contest 2013 for Denmark.

== Critical reception ==
Owing to her status as Eurovision winner, the album's release attracted a number of reviews from Eurovision fan sites. James Sayer of ESC Views gave it a mixed review, saying that "there is nothing wrong with any of the individual songs, there’s just not a great deal which leaps out of the realms of the ordinary". Angus Quinn of Wiwi Bloggs was of the opinion that "Only Teardrops gets it right most of the time and seems to respect the authenticity of the artist".

== Singles ==
"Only Teardrops" was released as the lead single of the album in Denmark on 22 January 2013, and worldwide on 2 May 2013. The song was a large success in Denmark and reached No 1 in the charts. The song also charted elsewhere in Europe following its Eurovision performance. It reached a new chart position of 15 in the UK Singles Chart on 26 May. "Hunter & Prey" was released as the second single of the album in Denmark on 19 August 2013.

== Track listing ==
No.	Title	Writer(s)	Length
1.	"Teardrops Overture"	Lise Cabble, Julia Fabrin Jakobsen, Thomas Stengaard	0:47
2.	"Hunter & Prey"	Emmelie de Forest, Cabble, Jakob Glæsner	3:29
3.	"Change"	Forest, Peter Bjørnskov, Lene Dissing	3:59
4.	"Only Teardrops"	Cabble, Jakobsen, Stengaard	3:02
5.	"What Are You Waiting For"	Jakobsen, Bjørnskov, Dissing	3:36
6.	"Haunted Heart"	Forest, Cabble, Stengaard	3:35
7.	"Force of Nature"	Forest, Marcus Winther-John	3:43
8.	"Beat the Speed of Sound"	Forest, Cabble, Glæsner	3:50
9.	"Soldier of Love"	Forest, Jakobsen, Rune Braager	3:25
10.	"Running in My Sleep"	Forest, Winther-John	3:38
11.	"Let It Fall"	Forest, Cabble, Frederik Thaae	3:49
12.	"Only Teardrops" (symphonic version)	Cabble, Jakobsen, Stengaard	3:18

== Charts ==
Chart (2013)	Peak positions
Belgian Albums (Ultratop Flanders)	140
Belgian Albums (Ultratop Wallonia)	160
Danish Albums (Hitlisten)	4
French Digital Albums Chart	91
German Albums (Offizielle Top 100)	61
Swedish Albums (Sverigetopplistan)	32

== Release history ==
Country	Release date	Format	Label
Denmark	6 May 2013	CD, digital download	Universal Music
Worldwide	14 May 2013	Digital download	Universal Music
Germany	7 June 2013	CD	Universal Music
