= Licht ins Dunkel =

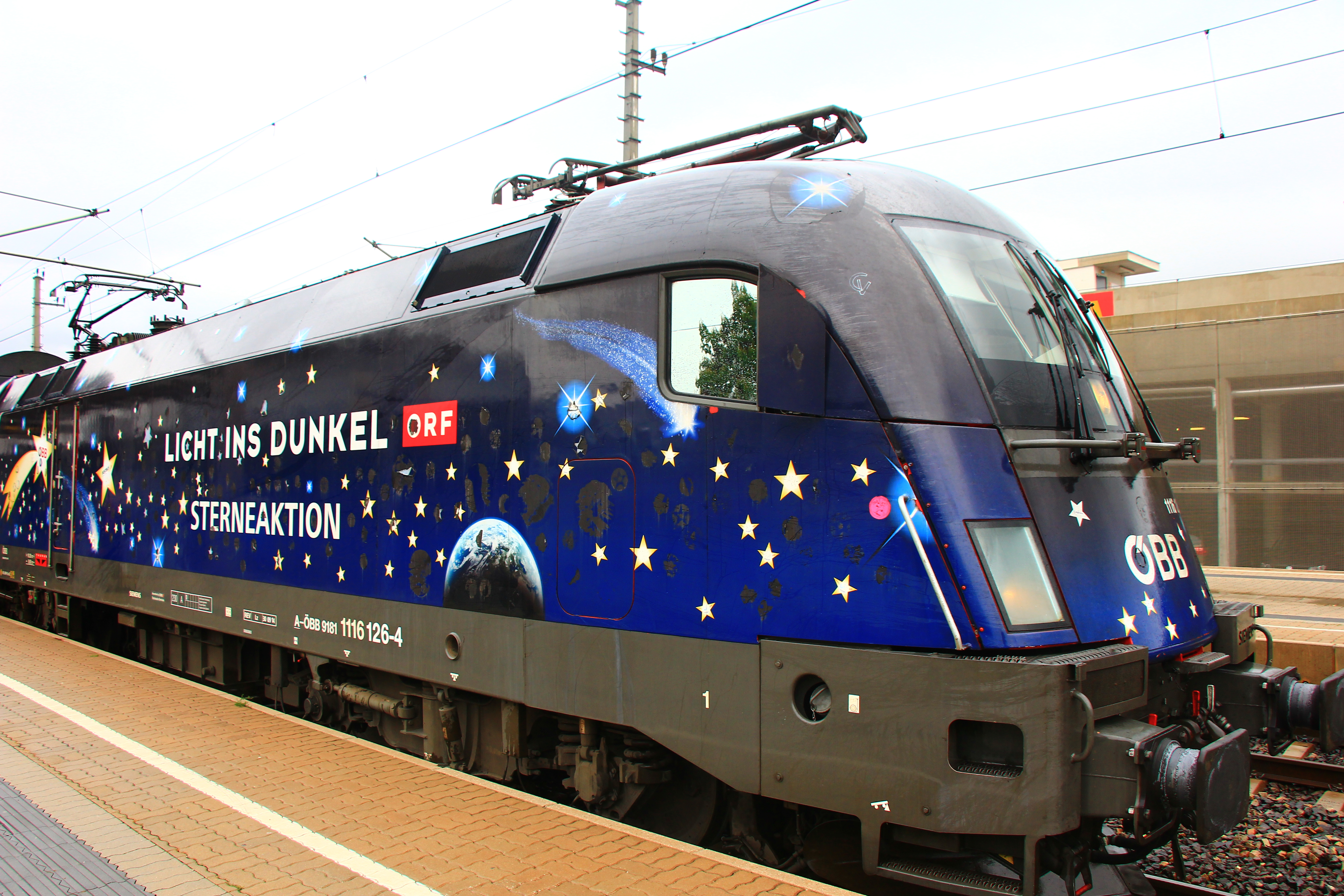
Licht ins Dunkel advertisement on a ÖBB-Locomotive

Licht ins Dunkel (German for "light into the dark") is an annual telethon held in Austria since 1973. The telethon is held every year on Christmas Eve for 14 hours on ORF2.

== Objective ==
The money raised is used to provide help for disabled persons. Donations can be made by phone, SMS, fax or online. The telethon is a permanent project and donations can also be made at post offices, banks and via the Internet all year round, not just during the telethon.

The word telethon itself is not used in Austria, but similar names such as Fernsehmarathon (television marathon) or Spendenmarathon (marathon of donations) are used.

== Criticism ==
Although the sum of money raised is increasing from year to year, these telethons are facing increasing criticism from viewers complaining about the whole-day blocking of one of the country's most important nationwide public television channels which usually airs highly rated programmes about culture, society, politics and business.

The telethon is also relayed on several regional public channels which either rebroadcast the nationwide telethon or organize additional shows on a regional or local level. Parts of the telethon are also aired on the German-language international satellite channel 3sat which is available throughout Europe - these parts of the telethon are relayed to 3sat's domestic service in Austria as well. Thus, viewers who are getting their television signals solely over the air and do not have access to satellite reception or cable-TV usually get 6 to 10 different channels of which at least three broadcast Licht ins Dunkel, parts of it, or regional telethons of Licht ins Dunkel on December 24, which is another source of annoyance for this group of viewers.

Since Austria is a highly organized welfare state with very high taxes to pay for a tight social security system, national healthcare which is free for everybody and government-provided help for people in need, many viewers consider additional money raising on public television as highly annoying or unnecessary. Some people even complain about Licht ins Dunkel since they do not wish to be confronted with the lives and problems of disabled persons on Christmas Eve.

Even some associations of disabled persons heavily criticized Licht ins Dunkel since disabled people are commonly depicted during the telethon as if they were completely helpless and unable to make their lives. Every year, some businesses consider the show as another advertising opportunity and make very high donations just in order to be mentioned one more time on television.

In 2008, several leading politicians appeared on the show which caused another wave of criticism - many viewers had the opinion that politicians should rather optimize the welfare state to provide better help for people for whom the public welfare services are not sufficient instead of pledging for donations. Due to the 2008 financial crisis, slightly fewer people were able or willing to donate. The total sum of donations in 2008 was about 5.5 million Euro which is still an increase of 10% compared to 2007.
