= Conchita Wurst =

Austrian singer and drag queen (born 1988)

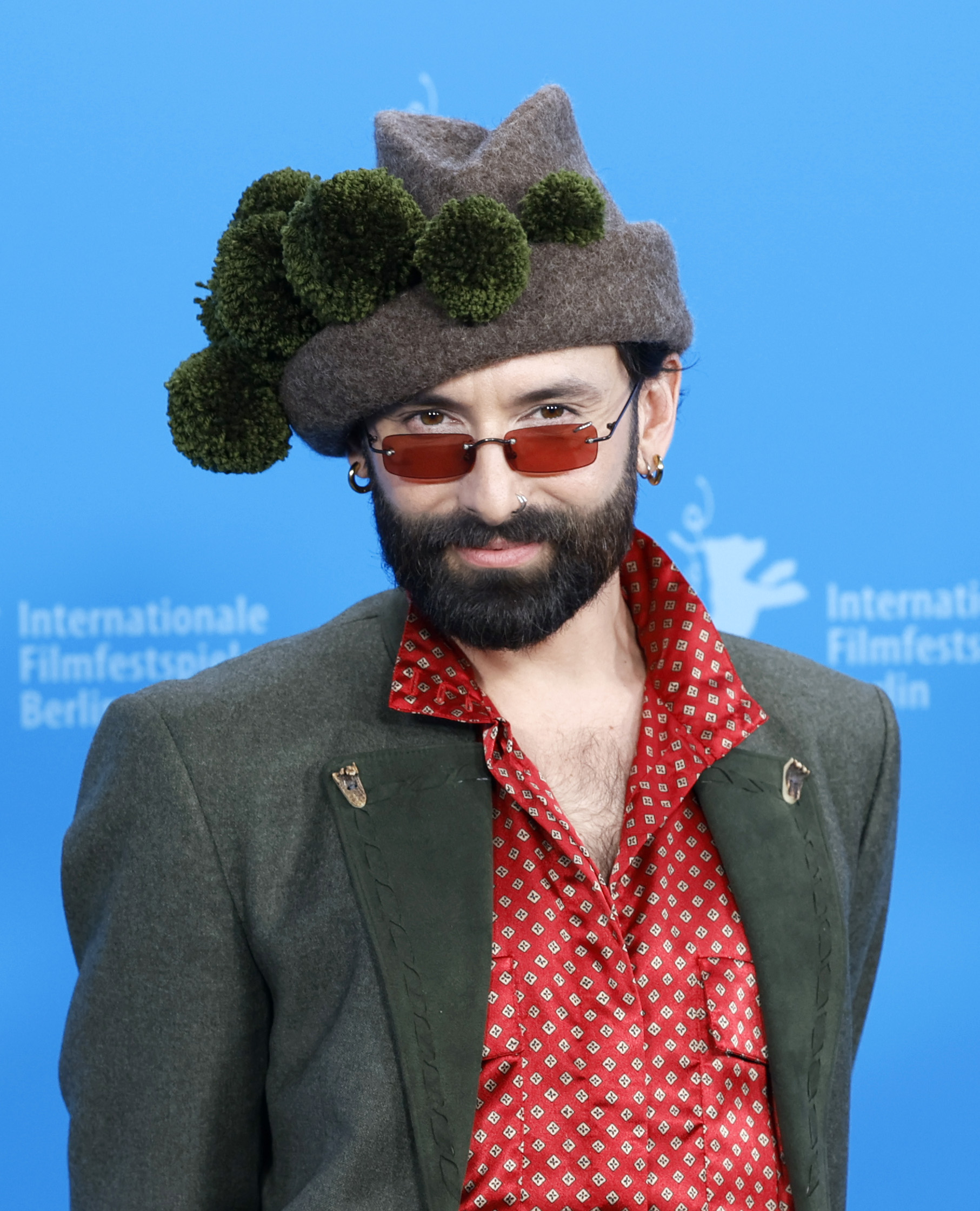
- Wurst in 2026

Background information
- Also known as: Conchita; Tom Neuwirth; Wurst
- Born: Thomas Neuwirth; 6 November 1988 (age 38); Gmunden, Austria
- Genres: Pop; electro
- Occupations: Singer; actor; drag queen; television personality
- Years active: 2006–present
- Label: Sony Music Austria
- Formerly of: Jetzt Anders!
- Website: conchitawurst.com

Thomas Neuwirth (born 6 November 1988) is an Austrian singer, actor, media personality and drag queen who is known for his stage persona Conchita Wurst, nicknamed "the Queen of Austria". He came to international attention after winning the Eurovision Song Contest 2014 for Austria with the song "Rise Like a Phoenix".

Born in Gmunden, Neuwirth moved to Graz to do his Matura exam with a focus on fashion, before embarking on a singing career through the 2007 casting show Starmania. He subsequently became a founding member of Jetzt Anders!, a short-lived boy band. In 2011, Neuwirth began appearing as Conchita—a female character noted for her beard—and came second in the Austrian national final for the Eurovision Song Contest 2012.

At the Eurovision Song Contest 2014, Neuwirth represented Austria as Conchita. His win brought him international attention and established him as a gay icon, resulting in invitations to perform at pride parades, the European Parliament, and the United Nations Office in Vienna.

== Early life ==
Neuwirth was born on 6 November 1988 in Gmunden and raised in the small town of Bad Mitterndorf, in the Styrian countryside in Austria. He stated that the mountainous area was a wonderful place to grow up, but that he faced prejudice for being gay: "Being a teenager, a gay teenager, in such a small village is not that much fun. I am part of the gay community and most gays have a similar story to mine."

From an early age he recognised that he was different from other children, initially believing that this was because there was "something wrong" with him. He occasionally wore a skirt to kindergarten and then school, although subsequently felt that he could only be happy doing so in the attic of his home. Aged 14, Neuwirth moved to Graz to attend school, with a focus on fashion. His fashion icon was Victoria Beckham.

== Career ==
=== 2006–2013: Early musical career ===
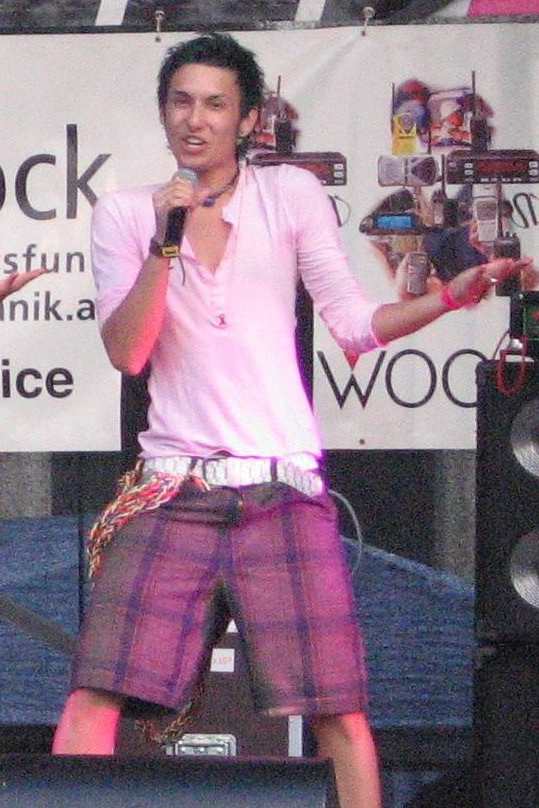
Neuwirth performing in 2007

In 2006, Neuwirth took part in the third edition of the Austrian TV show Starmania, finishing in second place behind Nadine Beiler. One year later, Neuwirth founded the boyband Jetzt Anders!, but the group disbanded that same year.

Neuwirth then developed the drag persona of Conchita Wurst, a bearded woman. In the German language, "Wurst" means "sausage", although Neuwirth relates the choice of last name to the common German expression "Das ist mir doch alles Wurst", which translates as "it's all the same to me". The name "Conchita" had been adopted from a Cuban friend of his. He also explained that conchita is Spanish slang for vagina and Wurst is German slang for penis.

Neuwirth asserted that the inclusion of the beard as part of the Conchita character was "a statement to say that you can achieve anything, no matter who you are or how you look." A beard as part of the drag look was pioneered in the 1970s by The Cockettes in San Francisco and the Bloolips in London.

Conchita's first appearance was on Austrian Broadcasting (ORF)'s show Die große Chance ("The Big Chance") in 2011, where she placed sixth. In 2012, she competed in the Austrian National Final for the Eurovision Song Contest 2012 and came second. Conchita then appeared in the ORF show The Hardest Jobs of Austria, working in a fish processing plant, and in Wild Girls, in which a group of candidates had to survive in the deserts of Namibia together with native tribes.

=== Participation in the Eurovision Song Contest 2014 ===
==== Selection ====
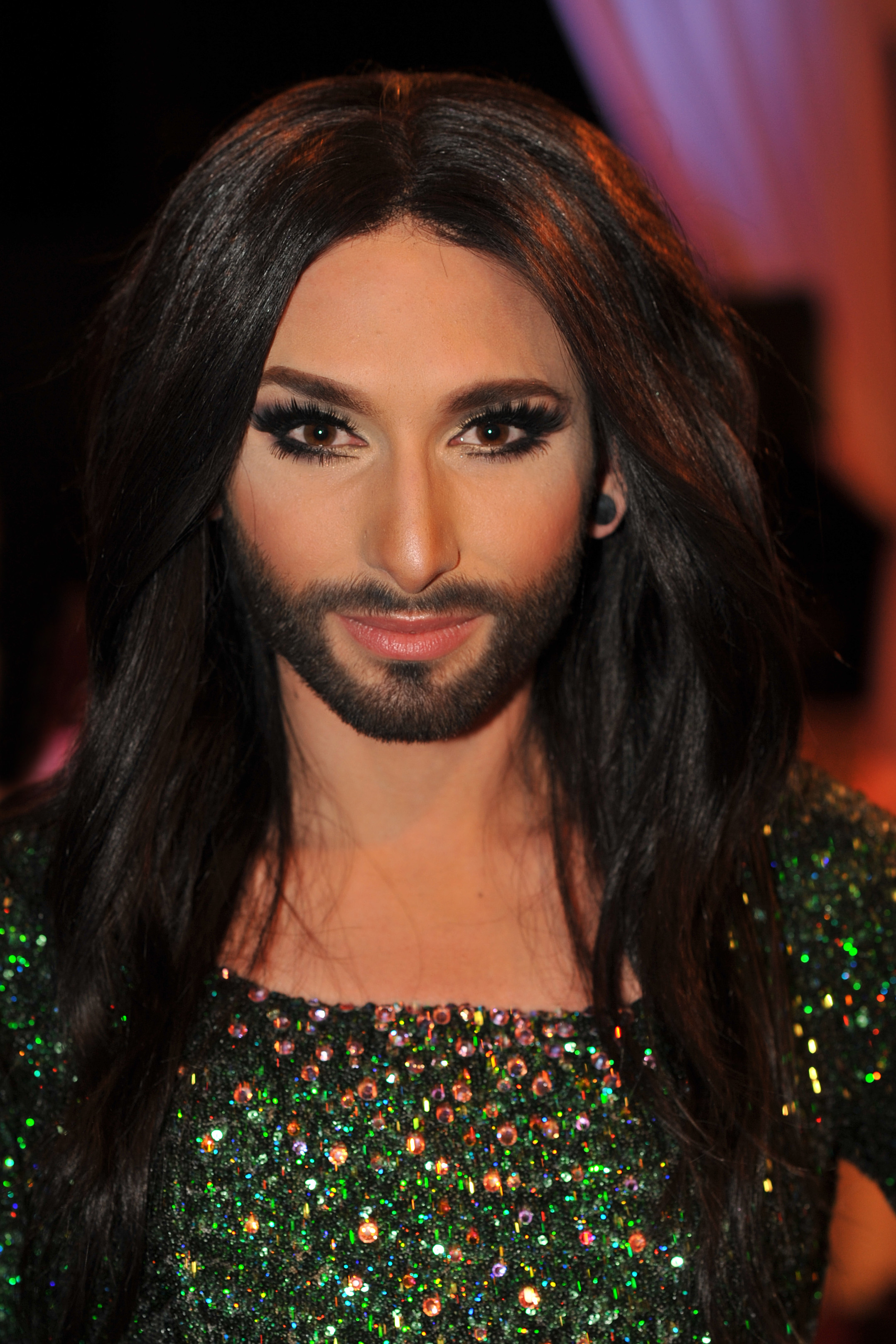
Conchita in March 2014

On 10 September 2013, Austrian national broadcaster ORF announced that it had selected Conchita to represent Austria at the Eurovision Song Contest 2014 in Copenhagen in May 2014. In March 2014, her song was revealed as "Rise Like a Phoenix", with bookmakers placing her as one of the ten favourites to win. Despite Eurovision's reputation for campness, Conchita's performance was designed to be serious and in good taste, and she was one of the few to appear onstage alone. Although individuals who identified as LGBT had appeared on Eurovision before—most notably Israel's Dana International, who won in 1998—Conchita's appearance was described by the New Statesman as the "most genderqueer yet".

Conchita's selection proved controversial and attracted criticism from conservative groups, particularly in Eastern Europe, thus highlighting the continent's regional divide between east and west on the issue of homosexuality. In Austria, within four days after ORF announced its decision, more than 31,000 people 'liked' a Facebook "Anti-Wurst" page. Petitions emerged in Russia and Belarus calling for their respective national broadcasters to edit out Conchita's performance from the televised contest; the Russian petition asserted that Eurovision had become "a hotbed of sodomy, at the initiation of European liberals". Conservative Russian politician Vitaly Milonov urged Russia's Eurovision selection committee to boycott the competition as a result of Conchita's inclusion, describing her performance as "blatant propaganda of homosexuality and spiritual decay" and referring to her as the "pervert from Austria". Armenia's entry for the contest, Aram Mp3, stated that Neuwirth's lifestyle was "not natural" and that he should decide whether he was a man or woman. Neuwirth responded, "I told him I don't want to be a woman. I am just a working queen and a very lazy boy at home." Aram subsequently apologised, stating that his comments had been intended as a joke.

Reacting to these sentiments, the New Statesman commented that "a vote for Wurst is another vote against Russian homophobia and transphobia, and a win would send out a strong message of defiance eastwards", while the International Business Times called on readers to vote for Conchita to upset homophobes. Highlighting statements such as these as evidence, Spiked declared that many Western European commentators and politicos had adopted Conchita as "a symbol of everything that makes Western Europe superior to the East" and that she had thus become part of a culture war against both Russia and "the so-called bigots and backward types" in their own nations.

==== Victory ====
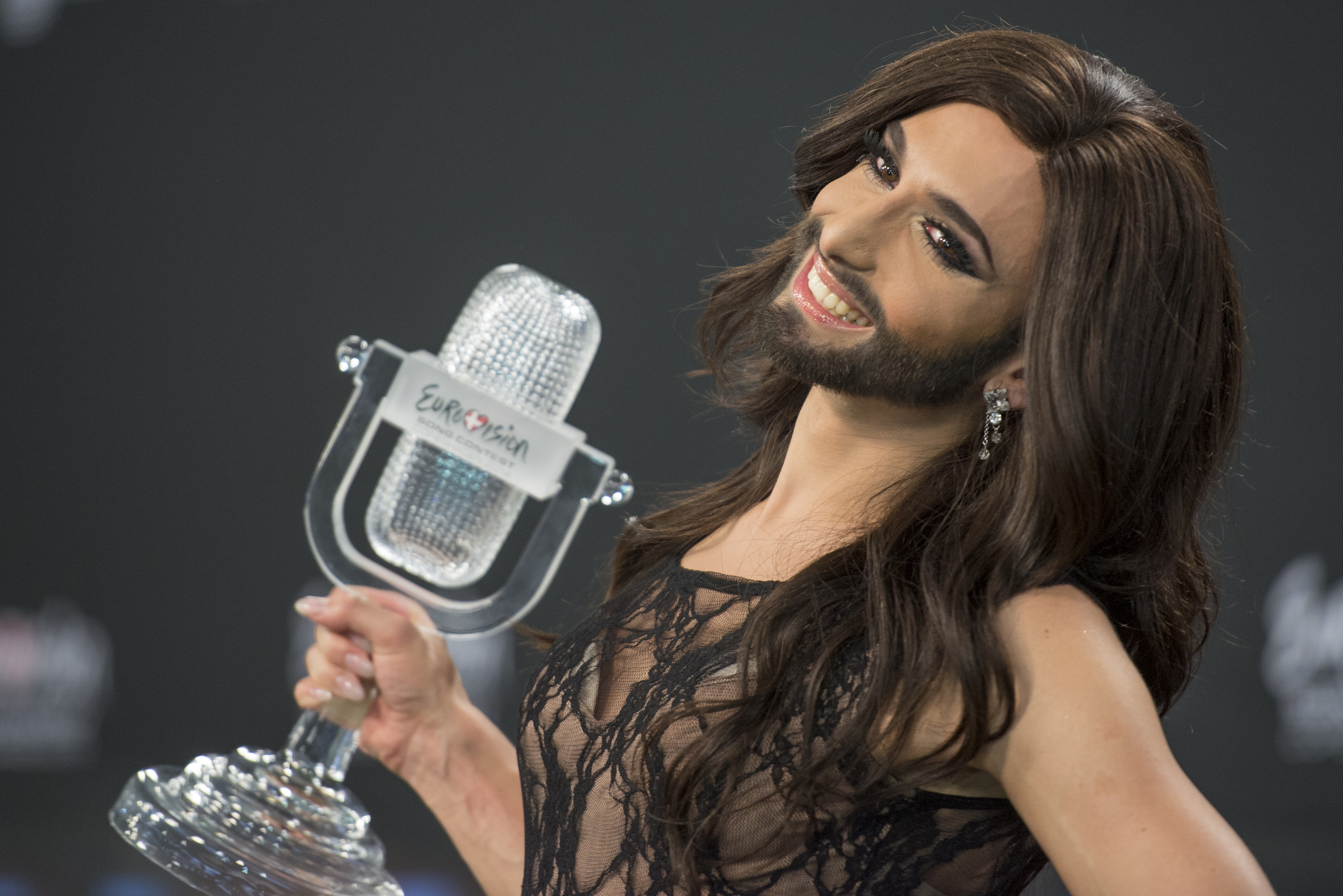
Conchita holding the Eurovision trophy after winning the contest

On 10 May 2014, Conchita won the competition with 290 points. This was Austria's first Eurovision win since the Eurovision Song Contest 1966. Her victory was also the first time a singer won without backing singers or dancers since 1970.

Points awarded to Austria in the ESC 2014

Conchita's entry gained high scores from Western European countries as well as some in the East, such as Georgia and Ukraine. However, the levels of support for Conchita varied across Europe: on average she received 4.4 points out of 12 from the post-Soviet states (excluding the Baltic states), 6 points from the other ex-socialist states, and 10.5 points from Western Europe, Scandinavia, Greece, and Israel. Commenting on this, political analyst Alan Renwick of the British University of Reading asserted that "Even in those countries where the ruling elites are often highly intolerant, the wider population might be readier to accept that different people might be different."

Upon being awarded the trophy, Conchita held it aloft and proclaimed "We are unity and we are unstoppable". She later confirmed to reporters that this was a message meant for politicians who opposed LGBT rights, including President of Russia Vladimir Putin, whose administration had implemented a law restricting LGBT rights in June 2013.

=== International response to victory ===
==== Positive ====
On returning to Austria, Conchita was greeted at the airport by 1,000 cheering fans, many wearing fake beards and singing "Rise Like a Phoenix". To journalists, she expanded on the message of tolerance which she had championed at Eurovision: "It was not just a victory for me but a victory for those people who believe in a future that can function without discrimination and is based on tolerance and respect." President of Austria Heinz Fischer asserted that it was "not just a victory for Austria, but above all for diversity and tolerance in Europe". A local radio station celebrated by playing "Rise Like a Phoenix" on a loop 48 times over four hours. The UK's Eurovision commentator Graham Norton remarked on the socio-political significance of her victory: "it seems like Eurovision has done something that matters just a little bit". Greek singers and former Eurovision entrants Helena Paparizou and Anna Vissi expressed their liking of the song and her appearance. Vissi compared Conchita's appearance to Italian singer Mina's appearance as a bearded woman on the cover of a 1981 album, to critically highlight that "[it is] 2014 and we still cannot accept statements of diversity."

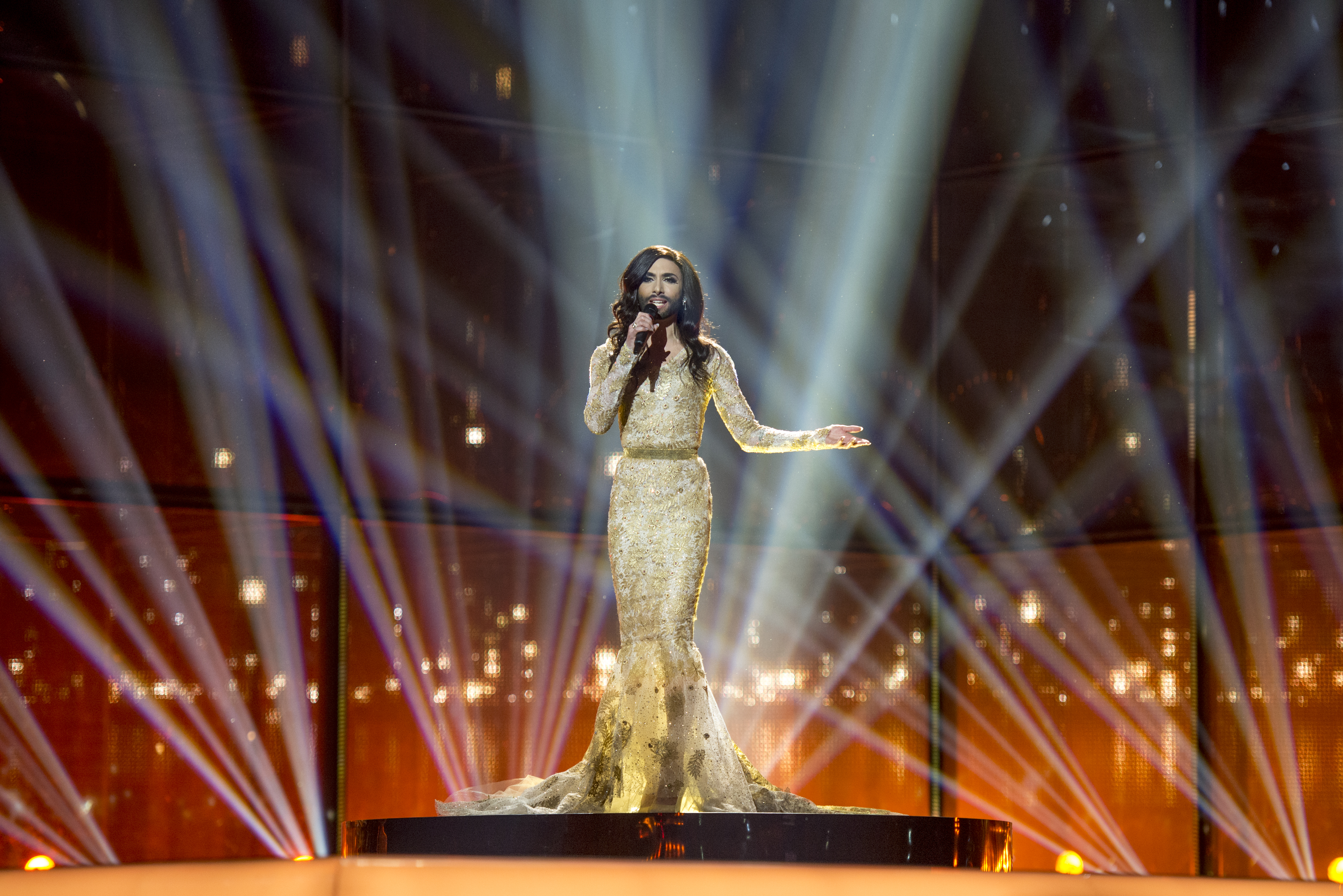
Conchita performing at Eurovision Song Contest 2014

Following her victory, Conchita became an icon for Europe's LGBT community. Vienna's tourist board hoped to use Conchita to encourage more gay holidaymakers to visit the city, using her image on the Facebook page "Gay-friendly Vienna". The Week stated that she had become "a serious figure of hope" for some LGBT people living "under the shadow of officially-sanctioned intolerance" in various European countries, while British transgender activist Paris Lees commented that across Europe she inspired "millions of people" and stood up for "everyone who has ever been made to feel ashamed or afraid for being different." LGBT rights groups in Serbia and Croatia criticised the tone with which their national broadcasters referred to Conchita, deeming it offensive and homophobic; Radio Television of Serbia subsequently issued a letter of apology.

In Russia, "Rise Like a Phoenix" topped the internet download chart two days after the competition. Fans of Conchita and LGBT rights activists applied to hold a Conchita Wurst March of Bearded Women and Men through Moscow, Russia, on 27 May, a date commemorating the 21st anniversary since the legalisation of same-sex sexual activity in the country. Officials from the city's security department rejected the request, citing a wish to "respect morality in the education of the younger generation" and to prevent violent clashes between marchers and anti-gay demonstrators. Russian singer Philipp Kirkorov, who helped write the Eurovision song "Shine", called on Russians to respect Conchita's victory, saying: "it was the song that won, and in my opinion it was a beautiful song."

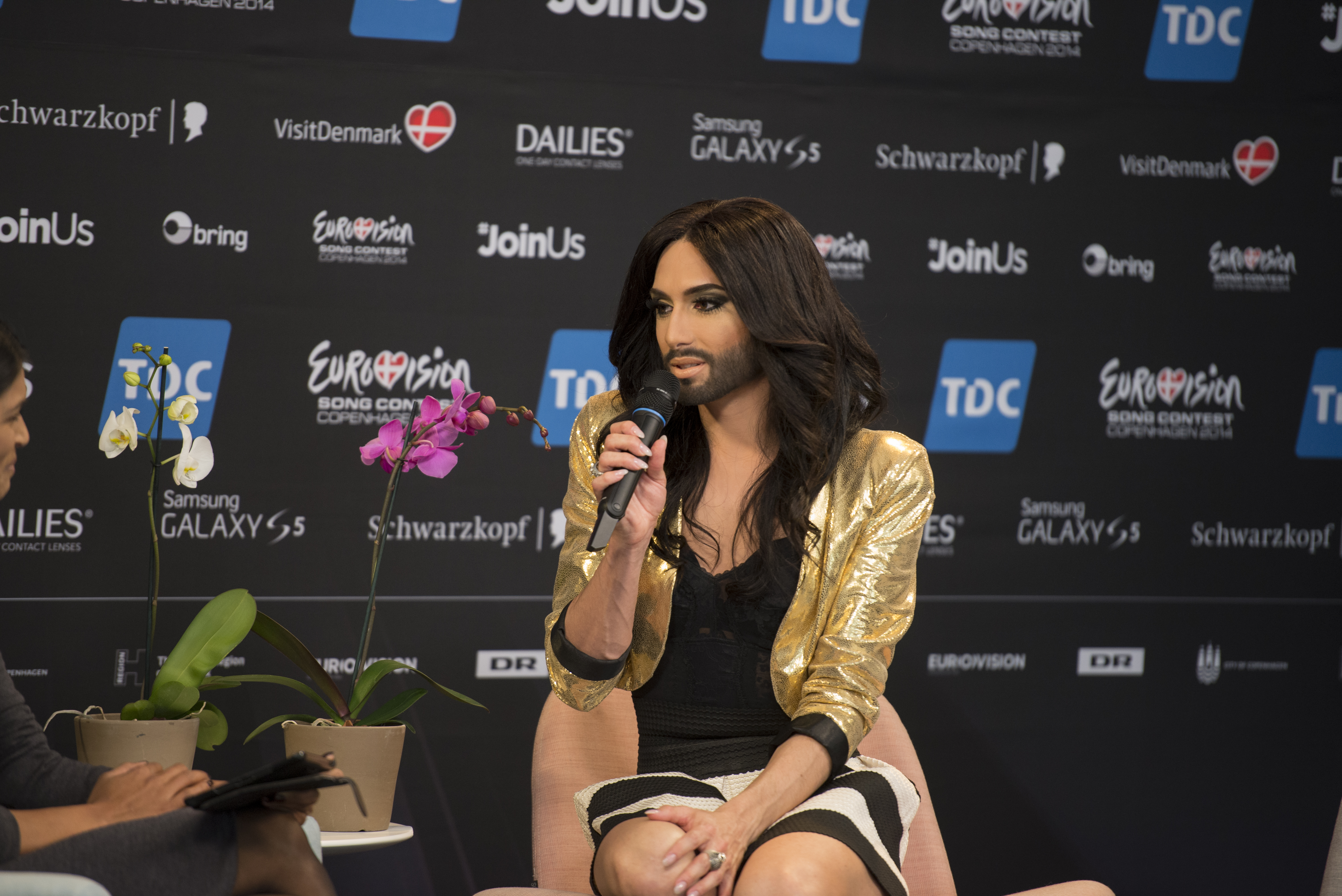
Conchita at a meet and greet in 2014

==== Negative ====
Volkan Bozkır, then chairman of Turkey's foreign affairs committee, remarked "thank God we no longer participate in Eurovision". The leader of Poland's opposition Law and Justice (PiS) party, Jarosław Kaczyński, said that "Very disquieting things are going on in Europe, things that show decadence, downturn and we would like to reverse this trend." A PiS spokesperson stated "Conchita Wurst is (...) a symbol of Europe I don't want. My Europe is based on Christian values." Deputy Prime Minister of Russia Dmitry Rogozin posted on Twitter that the result "showed supporters of European integration their European future: a bearded girl." Russia's opposition politician, the ultra-nationalist Vladimir Zhirinovsky, said "There's no limit to our outrage. It's the end of Europe", later adding "Fifty years ago the Soviet army occupied Austria. We made a mistake in freeing Austria. We should have stayed." Deputy leader of Russia's opposition Communist Party, Valery Rashkin, announced that "The last Eurovision results exhausted our patience... We cannot tolerate this endless madness", calling for the foundation of an alternative, The Voice of Eurasia, in which Russia and its neighbouring allies could compete. The Russian Orthodox Church condemned Conchita's victory, with Vladimir Legoyda, chairman of the church's information department, describing it as "yet one more step in the rejection of the Christian identity of European culture", reflecting an attempt to "reinforce new cultural norms". A social media campaign involved Russian men shaving off their beards in protest at Conchita's victory; those taking part included broadcaster Andrey Malakhov and rapper Aleksander "ST" Stepanov.

Patriarch Irinej of Serbia asserted that the 2014 Southeast Europe floods (mainly in Serbia and Bosnia and Herzegovina) were "divine punishment" from God for Conchita's victory. Metropolitan Amfilohije of Montenegro also blamed Conchita's victory for the floods. Irish television presenter for the BBC and former Eurovision BBC commentator Terry Wogan described that year's performance as a "freak show".

Reacting to these critics, Conchita stated "It's so ridiculous! For me a perfect world would be when we don't have to talk about sexuality, where you're from, what you believe. Is this the worst thing in the mind of the politicians?" She stated her desire to perform in Russia for the country's LGBT community, "To tell them that they are not alone. The whole community around the world is standing behind them. They have to trust that if they open their mouth, then we can change something." To a reporter from The Observer, she commented: "It's funny that these people think I'm so powerful. I've figured out over the years, you can only hurt me if I love you; if I don't know you, I really don't care. There are people who want to kill me and I'm always like, 'Well, get in line, darling.'"

=== 2014–present: Subsequent career ===
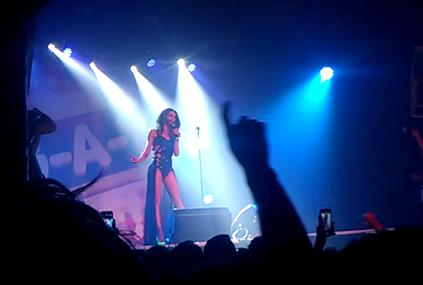
Conchita performing at London's gay superclub Heaven in May 2014

On 28 June 2014, Conchita performed onstage at Trafalgar Square in central London as the headline act during the city's annual LGBT Pride Parade. She was introduced onstage by actor and LGBT rights campaigner Ian McKellen, and performed to a crowd of over 300,000 alongside acts Samantha Fox and Sinitta. She informed reporters from The Observer that "I don't want to say the other Prides are less good, but I fell in love with London immediately, so today is a very special day for me. All the drag queens looked stunning."

On 2 July, she opened Madrid's LGBT Pride festival with a concert at Chueca Plaza, there performing alongside Ruth Lorenzo, before performing at Stockholm Pride on 30 July, at Antwerp Pride on 10 August, and at Manchester Pride on 24 August.

On 9 July, she made her modelling debut on the catwalk at fashion designer Jean Paul Gaultier's Couture show in Paris, where she took the final spot, which is usually reserved for Gaultier's favourite model. In August she modeled Givenchy clothing for Karl Lagerfeld's fashion editorial, "The New Normal", published in Carine Roitfeld's CR Fashion Book. She was invited to attend the 2015 Golden Globe Awards in Los Angeles as part of the Austrian delegation supporting nominee Christoph Waltz.

On 8 October, Conchita performed to a crowd of 2000 delegates and their staff at an anti-discrimination event held at the European Parliament in Brussels; her speech emphasised the values of tolerance, stating that "As I always say, you don't have to love me, but you have to respect that I'm here." Her appearance had been organised by the Austrian Member of the European Parliament (MEP) Ulrike Lunacek, a member of the Green Party, and while it had the backing of most of the European Parliament groups, it was not supported by the right-wing Europe of Freedom and Direct Democracy and European Conservatives and Reformists groups.

On 3 November, she performed at the United Nations Office at Vienna in front of UN Secretary-General Ban Ki-moon. A spokesperson for Ban described Conchita as a "cultural icon" and asserted that "Everyone is entitled to enjoy the same basic rights and live a life of worth and dignity without discrimination. This fundamental principle is embedded in the UN Charter and the Universal Declaration of Human Rights. Conchita is a symbol in that sense and I think it's good for them to meet. [The meeting allows us] to reassert [Ban's] support for LGBT people and for them to ensure that they enjoy the same human rights and protection that we all do." Conchita said that she would like to spend a week with Russian President Putin in order to better understand him and his government's stance on LGBT rights.

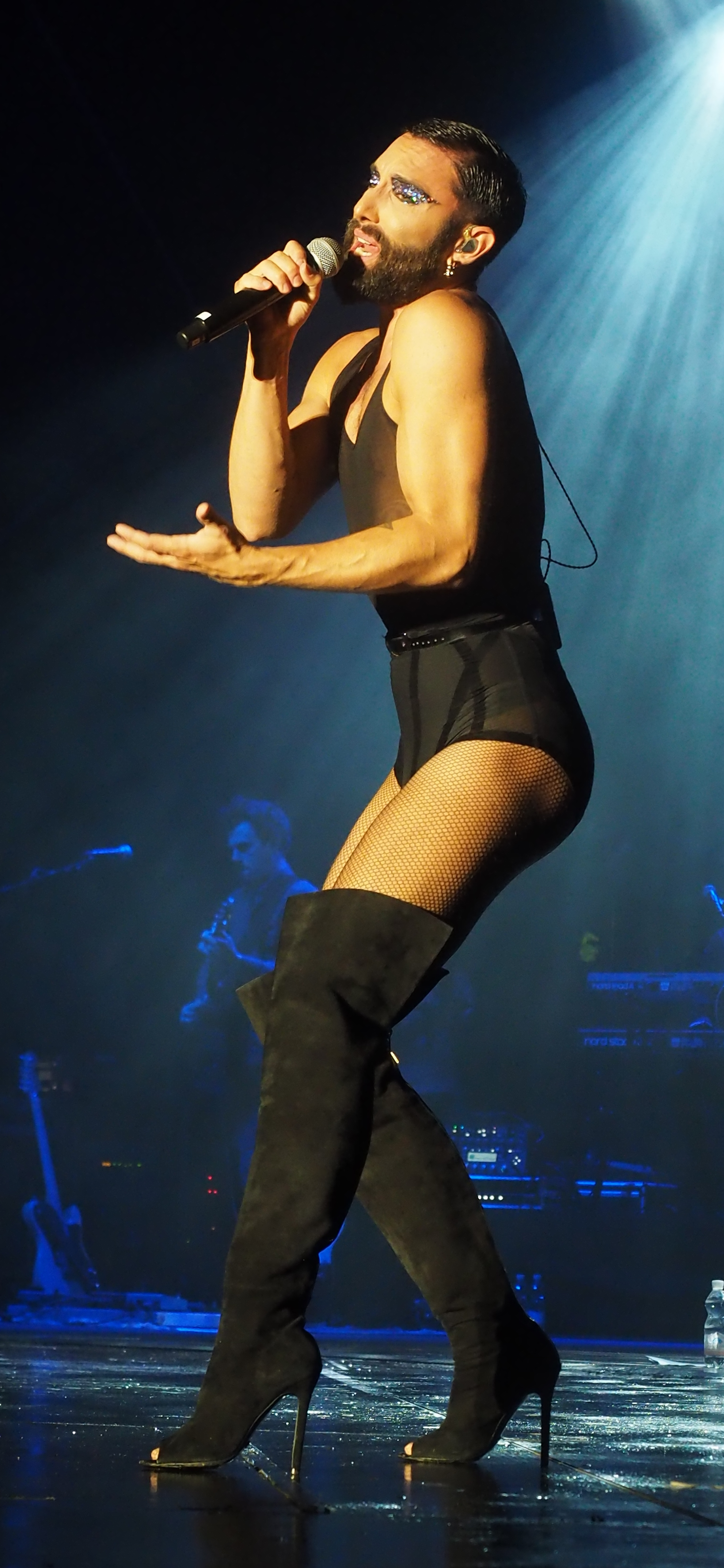
Conchita performing at the World Bodypainting Festival in 2019

Conchita proceeded to begin work on an album influenced by "mature ladies" like Cher, Shirley Bassey, and Tina Turner. Her first post-Eurovision single, "Heroes", was released on 8 November 2014. Conchita performed the song for the first time on Wetten, dass..?.

On 19 December 2014, it was revealed that Conchita would host the green room at the Eurovision Song Contest 2015 in Vienna.

On 5 March 2015, Conchita released her second single after winning the Eurovision Song Contest, "You Are Unstoppable". Her debut album Conchita was released on 15 May 2015. "Firestorm" and "Colours of Your Love", two tracks from the debut album, were released as a double A-side single on 7 August 2015.

On 7 May 2015, Conchita published her autobiography with John Blake Publishing.

On 3 March 2016, Conchita performed at the Sydney Opera House accompanied by the Sydney Symphony Orchestra and together with Australian stars like Courtney Act and Eurovision Song Contest 2015 participant Guy Sebastian as a part of Sydney Mardi Gras festival.

Conchita performed for BBC Radio 2's Friday Night Is Music Night on 25 February 2018 at the London Palladium. In April 2018, Conchita praised Israel's Netta Barzilai and her song "Toy" as her favourite song for Eurovision Song Contest 2018, saying "If she wins I will love it." In August 2018, Turkey's public broadcaster, the Turkish Radio and Television Corporation (TRT), stated it will not take part in the Eurovision while "someone like the bearded Austrian who wore a skirt" could win the competition.

In 2019, Neuwirth revealed that he would be splitting the characters: Conchita would continue with the more feminine style of performance, while a new mononymous persona called Wurst would allow for a more masculine expression. Neuwirth also announced that he would be releasing new music as Wurst. The single "Trash All the Glam" was released 8 March 2019 through Sony Music Austria. The second single shortly followed, entitled "Hit Me", which was said to be a hit back to a former boyfriend of Neuwirth's who he was receiving threats from about how he would publicly reveal his HIV-positive status. A third single, "See Me Now" was released on 5 April 2019. The album was announced under the name Truth Over Magnitude.

In 2019, Conchita became a permanent judge on the drag competition reality series Queen of Drags alongside Heidi Klum and Bill Kaulitz.

In 2020, Conchita had a cameo role in the Netflix film Eurovision Song Contest: The Story of Fire Saga.

In 2024, Conchita performed "Waterloo" with Charlotte Perrelli and Carola as an interval act for the final of the Eurovision Song Contest.

== Personal life ==
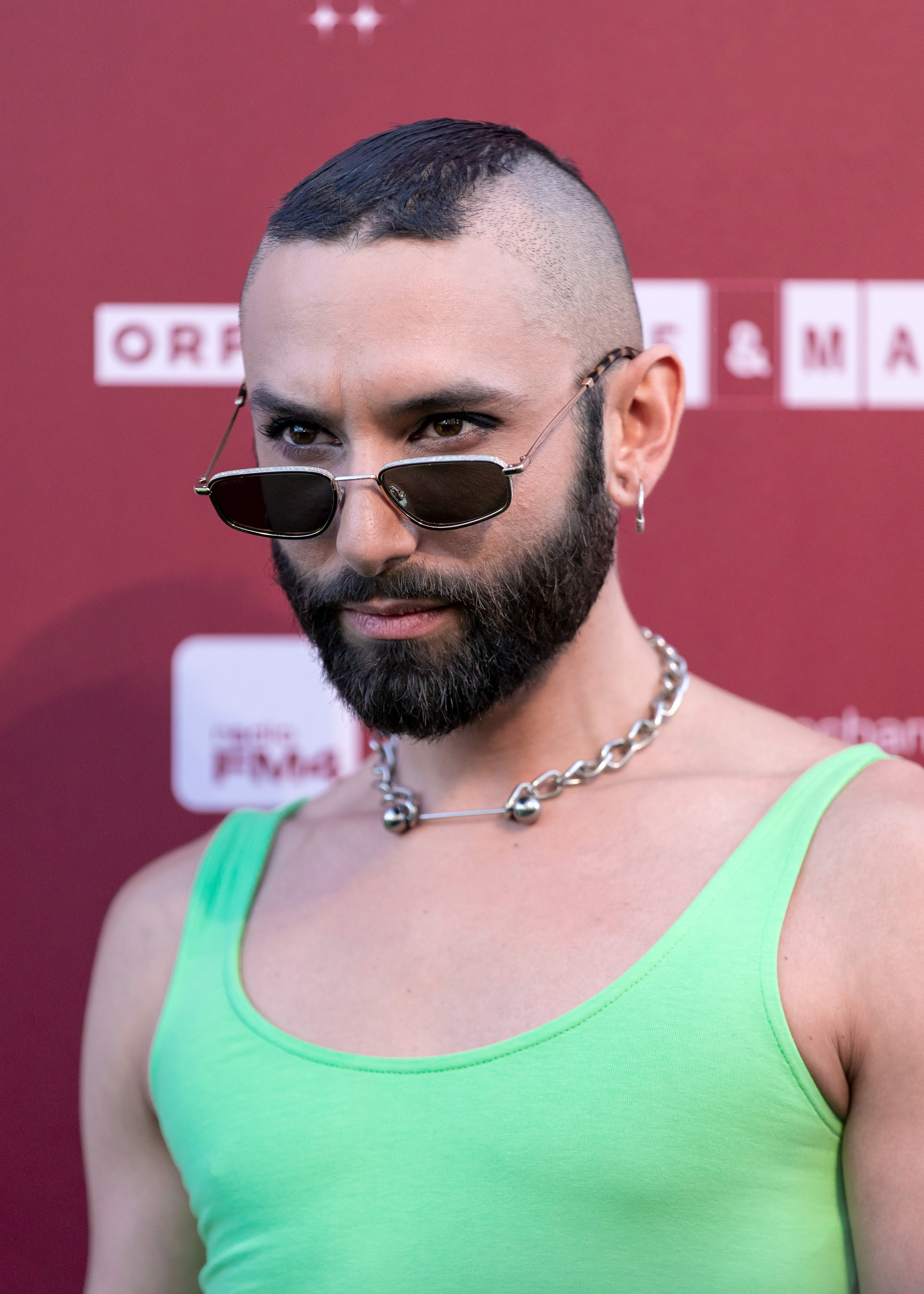
Neuwirth in 2019

Neuwirth created a fictional back story for the Conchita character, claiming that he was born in the mountains of Colombia and is married to the French burlesque dancer Jacques Patriaque, a friend of Neuwirth's. He compared the use of the character to American singer Beyoncé's adoption of the Sasha Fierce alter ego, or singer Lady Gaga's use of various costumes, being a way to protect Neuwirth's own private life.

In 2018, Neuwirth disclosed that he is HIV-positive and has been undetectable (and thus not infectious) for several years. He wrote through an Instagram post that he felt compelled to come out as HIV-positive due to persistent threats from a former boyfriend that he would publicly reveal Neuwirth's status.

== Discography ==
- Conchita (2015)
- From Vienna with Love (2018, with the Vienna Symphony)
- Truth Over Magnitude (2019)

== See also ==
- Verka Serduchka – a drag fictional character Eurovision entrant
- Silvía Night – a fictional character Eurovision entrant
- DQ – a drag queen Eurovision entrant
- Sestre – a drag band of Eurovision entrants
- Dana International – the 1998 Eurovision winner, a trans woman from Israel

Awards and achievements
Preceded by Natália Kelly with "Shine"	Austria in the Eurovision Song Contest; 2014	Succeeded by The Makemakes with "I Am Yours"
Preceded by Emmelie de Forest with "Only Teardrops"	Winner of the Eurovision Song Contest; 2014	Succeeded by Måns Zelmerlöw with "Heroes"
