= Suono libero =

Studio album by Gigi D'Agostino
- Released: 24 July 2008
- Genre: Italodance; lento violento
- Label: NoiseMaker

Gigi D'Agostino chronology
La musica che pesta (2008)	Suono libero (2008)

Suono libero (transl. Free Sound) is a two-disc album released by Gigi D'Agostino in 2008. It contains many remixes of previous works, including "L'Amour toujours", "Another Way", "La Passion", "Bla Bla Bla" (titled "La danza del sole"), "The Riddle" and "L'uomo sapiente" (titled "L'uomo dei fenomeni").

The first disc is mostly Italodance while the second is mostly lento violento.

== Track listing ==
=== CD 1 ===
1. "L'Amour toujours" (Forte Forte)
2. "Casa Dag"
3. "Another Way" (Angeli in Festa)
4. "La Passion" (Angeli in Festa)
5. "La danza del sole"
6. "The Riddle" (Get Up)
7. "Inventi"
8. "A volte io mi perdo"
9. "Io vorrei non vorrei ma se vuoi"
10. "Pioggia e sole"
11. "Sertirsi così"
12. "Il trip del vagabondo" (by Mr. Dendo)
13. "Magic of Love" (Gigi D'Agostino & Luca Noise Sintesi Mix; by Luca Noise)
14. "Indiano Dag"
15. "Walking"
16. "Casa Dag" (Au-uon)
17. "Magia"

=== CD 2 ===
1. "Paese in festa"
2. "Narcotic"
3. Dottor Dag – "Evviva le nana"
4. Dottor Dag – "Intendo dire"
5. Dottor Dag – "Mi sono capito"
6. Dottor Dag – "L'uomo dei fenomeni"
7. Dottor Dag – "Paciocco"
8. Dottor Dag – "Save the Rap" (Impiccio Mix)
9. Dottor Dag – "Legnata distorta"
10. Dottor Dag – "Quoting" (Mani a Destra Mani a Sinistra Mix)
11. Dottor Dag – "Pomp"
12. Dottor Dag – "Però"
13. Dottor Dag – "Capocantiere"
14. Dottor Dag – "Comunitensa"
15. Dottor Dag – "La ninna nanna"
16. Dottor Dag – "Esercizio del braccio"
17. Dottor Dag – "Musicore"
18. Dottor Dag – "Believe"
19. Dottor Dag – "Materasso Dag"
20. Dottor Dag – "Grattino Dag"
21. Tarro Noise & Zarro Dag – "In to the Bam" (Settore Terziario)
22. Dottor Dag – "Mi sta sulla cassa"
23. Dottor Dag – "Distorsione Dag" (Lussazione Mix)

== Charts ==
Chart performance for Suono libero
Chart (2008)	Peak position
Austrian Albums (Ö3 Austria)	32
Italian Albums (FIMI)	10
