= Tanzen =

EP by Gigi D'Agostino
- Released: 1999 (Italy)
- Genre: Electronic
- Label: EMI / BXR

Gigi D'Agostino E.P. chronology
Gin Lemon (1997)	Tanzen (1999)	Tecno Fes (2000)

Tanzen is an extended play by Italian DJ Gigi D'Agostino, released in 1999 through EMI / BXR Noise Maker records.

== Track listing ==
1. "The Riddle" (Club Mix)
2. "Your Love"
3. "Passion"
4. "Coca & Avana"
5. "Bla Bla Bla" (Dark Remix)
6. "Star"
7. "Another Way"
8. "A.A.A."
9. "Acid"
10. "One Day"
11. "Movimento"
12. "The Riddle" (J&B Original Dub Mix)
13. "Bla Bla Bla" (Abbentenza in FM Mix)
