= Carlo Prevale =

Italian DJ

Prevale
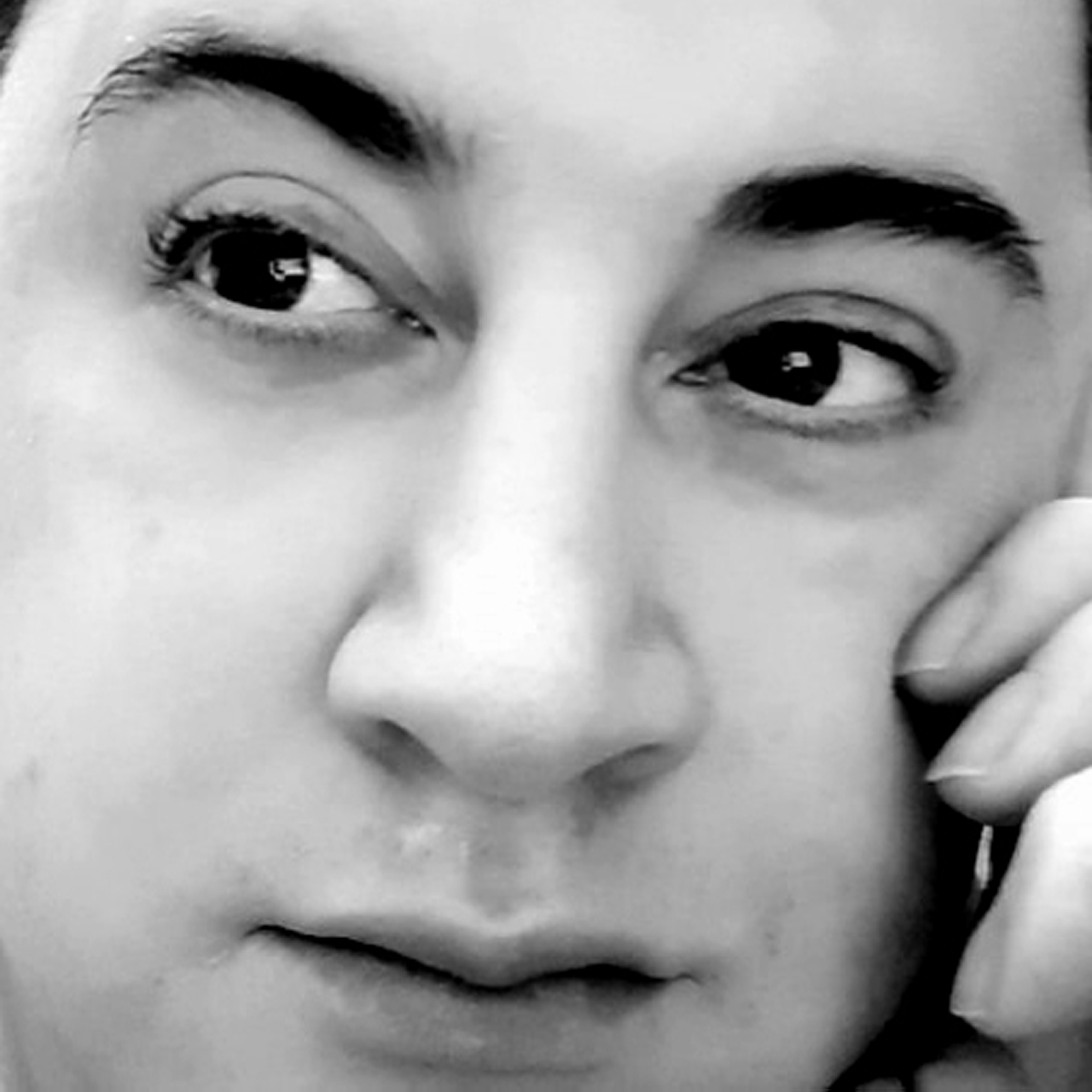
- Prevale in 2020

Background information
- Also known as: Carlo Web, Prevaloso
- Born: Carlo Prevale; 6 July 1983 (age 43); Subiaco, Italy
- Genres: Dance, Italodance, Eurodance, Lento Violento, Techno, Electronica
- Occupations: DJ, Record producer, Remixer, Radio Host
- Years active: 1999–present
- Labels: Dmn Records, Bit Records, Plast Records, Fluida Records, Believe Digital, Dieffe Publishing, Smilax Publishing, Disco Planet Records
- Website: prevale.net

Prevale, also known by full name Carlo Prevale (Italian: [ˈkarlo preˈvale], born 6 July 1983, in Subiaco), is an Italian disc jockey, record producer, remixer and radio host.

== Career ==
Prevale worked at Radio m2o for 15 years, directs Plast Records, and operates his recording studio Suono Strano, where he produces musical productions, compilations, jingles, music acronyms, radio-television formats and deals with advertising dubbing.

He is a former member of the dance music group Tarquini & Prevale; they had several collaborations in 2004 on the Roman radio station Radio Centro Suono, conducting programs such as Voglio Vederti Danzare and Mix Time Machine. Subsequently, for the m2o radio station, again with the same musical group, he conducted programs such as Kick off – m2o nel Pallone and Gamepad – La Consolle Virtuale, with the latter also mixed 2 compilations and created different record productions.

Prevale in 2005 abandoned the local radio presenting as author a new format to the artistic direction of the newly formed m2o, national broadcaster of dance music of the Gruppo Editoriale L'Espresso: Kick off – m2o nel Pallone, a mix of dance music and trance alternated in voice from news on the world of football that was broadcast every Sunday morning from 11.00 to 13.00.

In 2006, he is the presenter and author of another broadcast for the m2o station: Gamepad – La Consolle Virtuale. An italodance music container alternating in voice with news on the world of video games, created in collaboration with videogame console manufacturers such as: Sony, Microsoft, Nintendo, Activision, Ubisoft and Koch Media.

In the same year he started a recording project, producing his first single: In My Dreams, included in the Amoroso's Invasion compilation produced by the Perugia label Smilax Publishing, followed in 2007 by his second single: Sognami, version sung in Italian by In My Dreams.

Also in 2007 he selects and mixes Gamepad Compilation Vol. 1.0, a collection of italodance music linked to the homonymous program he broadcast on m2o, produced by the record label of Bit Records and distributed by Caymera S.r.l. of the Mondadori group; followed successively by the Gamepad Compilation Vol. 2.0, always produced by Bit Records and distributed by Self.

In 2009, for Fluida Records, Turin's record label, he produced the cover: Ritual Tibetan by Gigi D'Agostino and New Year's Day by U2, both of which were included in the Musica Maranza Vol. 6 compilation, followed the following year by the remix of I Gotta Feeling (Carlo Prevale Dance Concept) inserted in Musica Maranza Vol. 7.

In 2010, he left the management of Gamepad – La Consolle Virtuale to Tarquini and Mila, this ending all the radio and record activities of the group. Tarquini continues his work as a radio host until 2014, when he leaves his post to Mila and Fabio Amoroso.

In January of the same year, together with DJ and record producer Sanny J, Prevale released Once Again (in the Main Mix and Club Mix version) the Main Mix version was included, first in the DJ Player Vol. 9 compilation, then added in 2011, along with the Club Mix version in the DJ Player Collection 01, both produced by the record label Disco Planet Records and distributed throughout Italy from Self.

In 2011 he creates the following remixes: 2 Times (Prevaloso Tanz Remix) di Ann Lee, Adesso Balla (Prevale Remix) Tanz Vision di Daniele Meo, Le Canzoni Dell'Estate (Ti Batte Il Cuore Mix) di Emi, Il Più Grande Spettacolo Dopo Il Big Bang (Io e Te Mix) and Tensione Evolutiva (Pioggia e Vento Mix) di Jovanotti.

In 2013 Prevale resumed the radio activity returning to the air as author of Memories, a DJ set of electronic music alternating with aphorisms, of which it is the official voice, also producing the following remixes: Surrender (Discotecoso Mix) by The Soundlovers, Ah Yeah! by Will Sparks, Let It Be The Night by Kim Lukas, Ode To Oi by TJR and Discotek People by Molella. From 2013 to 2016 he directed, mixed and selected the radio broadcast on m2o I FedEly del Weekend, conducted by Il Fede, Federico Riesi and La Ely, Elisabetta Sacchi.

During 2014 he creates remixes: L'Amour Toujours (I'll Fly With You) by Sagi Rei, Like It (Boom Ba Da Da Mix) by 20 Fingers, #Selfie by The Chainsmokers and Five Hours (Don't Hold Me Back) by Deorro. In June he released an Extended Mix and Radio Edit version of the song Wanna Be Free, the 2014 single by Brazilian singer Regina, produced by the German record label Dmn Records and also included in various collections such as: Dance It up Vol. 6, DJ Remixmania Vol. 3, Ultimate Workout Music 2015 – Eurodance Hits, Step by Step – The Fitness Compilation Vol. 2, Maximum Eurodance, We Love Italo Dance Vol. 3, The Eurodance Evolution 2016.

Between 2015 and 2016 he released the following remixes: Alza Il Volume by Giorgio Prezioso and Fabri Fibra, Chissenefrega 'In Discoteca' by Club Dogo, The Bad Touch of the Bloodhound Gang, Un Angelo Blu from the Hotel Saint George, Lei Che Lo Vuole of Katerfrancers, Dieci Cento Mille of Brothers, Gangsta by Kat Dahlia, Loved Me Back to Life by Céline Dion.

In January 2016 he founded Plast Records, an Italian record label for electronic music of which he is A&R and executive record producer. In Plast Music Studio he composes and produces 2 singles of Lento Violento genre: Yo Oh Yeah! and Echi.

On 17 November 2016, his single Profondo Rosso comes out on Plast Records label.

On 21 March 2017 he released And the Waltz Goes On, album containing 3 different dance versions of the song, composed at the age of 19, by the famous American actor Sir Anthony Hopkins. On 22 May 2017 he produces and arranges L'Onore e il Rispetto, album containing 4 different dance versions that take the title from the soundtrack of the television fiction broadcast by Canale 5. For summer 2017 he remixed Occidentali's Karma, a song with which Francesco Gabbani wins the sixty-seventh edition of the Sanremo Festival.

In 2018 he creates the following remixes: Keep On Rising by Ian Carey feat. Michelle Shellers, Bambola of the Canadian singer Betta Lemme, Scooby Doo Pa Pa, viral single from the Chilean DJ and producer DJ Kass, Ah Yeah! by Will Sparks, Solo, from the British electronic music group Clean Bandit featuring Demi Lovato, Amore e Capoeira by Takagi & Ketra feat. Giusy Ferreri & Sean Kingston and Mayores, the international success of the American singer and actress Becky G featuring Bad Bunny.

On 18 October 2018 with Plast Records publishes Lambada (El Ritmo Caliente Prevaloso), initially published on 27 July 2012 by the Turin record label Fluida Records, but withdrawn from the market a month later, at the behest of Carlo Prevale, due to a disagreement with the publisher.

On 14 December 2018, on the occasion of Christmas and end of year festivities, for the record label Bit Records in Asti he made Happy Christmas 'War is Over', an album containing 8 audio tracks of which 4 different versions, available in Extended and Radio Mix, of the legendary song composed by John Lennon of The Beatles and Yoko Ono, revisited in a dance key and interpreted by the Salento singer Desi.

On 4 August 2019 he realizes So Much for Singing, EP composed of 6 tracks in 3 versions published by the record label Plast Records.

During 2019 and 2020 on his YouTube channel he releases a series of remixes: Gangsta, the debut single of rapper Kat Dahlia in the (Unz Element Vision), (Rap Element Vision) and (Lento Violento Vision) versions. Diggy Down 'Piano Deluxe' by Romanian singer Inna, Geht's Noch? by Roman Flugel in the versions (Tanzen Vision) and (Violent Vision), Blow It (Prevaloso Unz Element) by Federico Scavo, Memories (Ahi Ahi Ahi Mix) of the Italian musical group eurodance Netzwerk and Bando (Prevaloso Energy Remix), debut single by the Italian rapper Anna. Bad Guy in (Tanzen Vision), (Violent Vision) and (Quiet Vision) versions of the American singer-songwriter Billie Eilish, that of Someone You Loved in the versions: (Emotional Tanzen Mix), (Emotional Progress Mix), (Emotional Piano Mix) and (Emotional Violent Mix), planetary hit by the Scottish singer-songwriter and multi-instrumentalist Lewis Capaldi. The Woodchuck Song in (Prevale Edit) version of the Swedish DJ and producer AronChupa sung by his sister Little Sis Nora, Hollywood in the (Pure Movement), (Tanzen Movement) and (Violent Movement) versions of La Vision in collaboration with Gigi D'Agostino. The remix of Jerusalema, viral single by the South African record producer Master KG, made with the participation of the South African singer Nomcebo in 5 versions: (Prevaloso Tanzen Movement), (Prevaloso Harmonic Movement), (Prevaloso Alternative Movement), (Prevaloso Terzinato Movement) and (Prevaloso Wood Movement). Candlelight, in version (Prevaloso Concept), a piece by the German musical group Lizot. La Passion by Gigi D'Agostino based on Rectangle by French musician Jacno, realized in the version (Emotional Violent Creation), (Emotional Pure Creation), (Emotional Terzinato Creation), (Emotional Tanzen Creation) and (Emotional Quiet Creation). 7 Vizi Capitale, song created by rapper Piotta feat. Il Muro del Canto, as well as the theme song for Suburra, in versions: (Prevaloso Pure Mix), (Prevaloso Progress Mix), (Prevaloso Violent Mix) and (Prevaloso Tanzen Mix). Solo, the first solo single by Jennie, South Korean singer and rapper of the Blackpink musical group in 4 versions: (Rap Vision), (Progress Vision), (Tanzen Vision) and (Violent Vision). Wellfare by Gigi D'Agostino in the versions: (Emotional Piano Mix), (Emotional Quiet Mix), (Emotional Legna Mix), (Emotional Tanzen Mix) and (Emotional Terzinato Mix).

On 19 December 2020, published on all the main digital stores in the world by Plast Records, produces La Serenissima. EP consisting of 8 tracks in Extended and Radio Mix in 4 versions: (Prevaloso Pure Movement), (Prevaloso Progress Movement), (Prevaloso Tanzen Movement), (Prevaloso Violent Movement).

On 10 January 2021, on his YouTube channel he published 5 remix versions of Alza Il Volume by Giorgio Prezioso and Fabri Fibra: in (Pure Essence), (Progress Essence), (Tanzen Essence), (Terzinato Essence), and the (Violent Essence); 5 versions of Someone Like You by Adele: in (Pure Vision), (Soft Vision), (Progress Vision), (Tanzen Vision) and (Violent Vision). Finally an Edit of Hot Like A Megan 'Ha Ha Ha' by Alfons & B3nte.

In February 2021 he released the remix of Nesli's La Fine in 4 versions: (Emotional Slow Quiet), (Emotional Slow Progress), (Emotional Slow Violent), (Emotional Slow Tanzen); 5 versions of Your Loving Arms by Billie Ray Martin: (Legna Vision), (Progress Vision), (Quiet Vision), (Tanzen Vision) and (Terzinato Vision). On the occasion of 14 February, Valentine's Day, lovers party, he creates 6 versions of Ti Porto Via Con Me by Lorenzo Jovanotti: (Essential Main Mix), (Essential Legna Mix), (Essential Progress Mix), (Essential Quiet Mix), (Essential Tanzen Mix) and (Essential Terzinato Mix).

In March 2021 he published the remix of Here She Comes Again, a song by the Norwegian electropop duo Röyksopp in 4 versions: (Prevaloso Legna Mix), (Prevaloso Main Mix), (Prevaloso Quiet Mix) and (Prevaloso Tanzen Mix). He also makes 3 edits of the songs: Glitch, Cederick Digoi and Jamrock Land by the Swedish music producer Alfons.

In June 2021 he realizes and publishes on his social channels the remix of the song It's All About by Rooftime in the versions: (Prevaloso Break Mix), (Prevaloso Legna Mix), (Prevaloso Progress Mix), (Prevaloso Quiet Mix) and (Prevaloso Tanzen Mix). The remix of Discoteque in the versions: (Prevale Break Mix), (Prevale Legna Mix), (Prevale Progress Mix), (Prevale Quiet Mix) and (Prevale Tanzen Mix); single by the musical group The Roop which represented Lithuania at the Eurovision Song Contest 2020 reaching 8th place. The remix of Rave in the Grave by the Swedish brothers AronChupa and Little Sis Nora in the versions: (Prevale Break Edit), (Prevale Legna Edit), (Prevale Pure Edit) and (Prevale Tanzen Edit). The remix of MDMA, single by Little Sis Nora in the versions: (Prevale Break Mix), (Prevale Legna Mix), (Prevale Quiet Mix) and (Prevale Tanzen Mix).

Between September and December 2021 he remixed the song Svegliarsi la Mattina by Zero Assoluto in the versions: (Prevaloso Slow Progress Mix), (Prevaloso Slow Mena Mix), (Prevaloso Slow Corsetta Mix), (Prevaloso Slow Break Mix), (Prevaloso Slow Tanzen Mix) and (Prevaloso Slow Quiet Mix). The remix of Drippin 'in Milano, single by the Italian rapper Anna in the versions: (Prevaloso Tanzen Mix), (Prevaloso Quiet Mix), (Prevaloso Progress Mix), (Prevaloso Legna Mix), (Prevaloso Corsetta Mix) and (Prevaloso Break Mix). The remix of the song Dolce & Gabbana by Katerfrancers, member of the Italian musical group Power Francers in the versions: (Essential Fitness Mix), (Essential Mena Mix), (Essential Progress Mix), (Essential Quiet Mix), (Essential Terzinato Mix), (Essential Tanzen Mix) and (Essential Violent Mix). The remix of the single What If by Ne-Yo in the version: (Emotional Gym Vision), (Emotional Piano Vision), (Emotional Progress Vision), (Emotional Quiet Vision), (Emotional Tanzen Vision), (Emotional Terzinato Vision) and (Emotional Violent Vision). The remix of the single Easy on Me by the singer Adele in the versions: (Emotional Progress Mix), (Emotional Progress Mix), (Emotional Terzinato Mix), (Emotional Tanzen Mix), (Emotional Quiet Mix), (Emotional Mena Mix), (Emotional Gym Mix). The remix of Right Now 'Na Na Na' by the Senegalese singer Akon in the versions: (Prevaloso Fitness Mix), (Prevaloso Mena Mix), (Prevaloso Progress Mix), (Prevaloso Quiet Mix), (Prevaloso Tanzen Mix), (Prevaloso Terzinato Mix), (Prevaloso Violent Mix); finally the remix of the song Without You by the Australian singer The Kid Laroi, sung together with Miley Cyrus, in the versions: (Slow Violent Mix), (Slow Gym Mix), (Slow Mena Mix), (Slow Tanzen Mix), (Slow Progress Mix) and (Slow Quiet Mix).

Considered one of the best Italian disc jockeys, Prevale on Radio m2o until March 2019 conducted Memories – Il DJ Set Afortismatico, one of the most famous radio programs that helped bring the radio to the top of the listening charts in a short time. In addition, he conducted several episodes of m2o Selection, the official DJ set of the radio station's music programming.

== Radio ==
=== Regional radio broadcasts ===
- Voglio Vederti Danzare (Radio Centro Suono, 2004–2005)
- Mix Time Machine (Radio Centro Suono, 2004–2005)

=== National radio broadcasts ===
- Kick off – m2o nel Pallone (m2o, 2005–2006)
- Gamepad – La Consolle Virtuale (m2o, 2006–2014)
- I FedEly del Weekend (m2o, 2013–2016)
- Memories – Il DJ Set Aforismatico (m2o, 2013–2019)
- m2o Selection (m2o, 2013–2019)

== Discography ==
=== Albums ===
- 2007 – Never Meet / Sognami (Bit Records)
- 2014 – Wanna Be Free (Italian Remixes) (Dmn Records)
- 2017 – And The Waltz Goes On (Plast Records)
- 2017 – L'onore e il Rispetto (Plast Records)
- 2018 – Happy Christmas 'War is Over' (Bit Records)
- 2019 – So Much for Singing (Plast Records)
- 2020 – La Serenissima (Plast Records)

=== Compilations ===
- 2007 – Amoroso's Invasion (Smilax Publishing)
- 2008 – Italo Fresh Hits 2008 (ZYX Music)
- 2008 – Super Italia – Future Sounds Of Italo Dance Vol. 29 (Universal Music)
- 2009 – Musica Maranza Vol. 6 (Fluida Records)
- 2010 – Musica Maranza Vol. 7 (Fluida Records)
- 2010 – DJ Player Vol. 9 (Disco Planet Records)
- 2010 – Italo Mega Dance Vol. 18 (Buntspecht)
- 2011 – DJ Player Collection 01 (Disco Planet Records)
- 2012 – Rimini, a Night to Dance (Top Italian Floorfillers) (Believe Digital)
- 2013 – Summer Lambada Compilation 2013 (Dieffe Publishing)

=== Mixed compilations ===
- 2000 – Dimensione Musicale Compilation Vol. 1 (Track Production)
- 2002 – Dimensione Musicale Compilation Vol. 2 (Track Production)
- 2003 – Senti Come Muove Compilation (Track Production)
- 2003 – DNA Compilation (Track Production)
- 2004 – Unz & Tunz Compilation (Track Production)
- 2005 – DJ Prevale Compilation Vol. 1.0 (Track Production)
- 2005 – DJ Prevale Compilation Vol. 2.0 (Track Production)
- 2006 – La Discoteca Compilation (Track Production)
- 2007 – Gamepad Compilation Vol. 1.0 (Bit Records)
- 2009 – Gamepad Compilation Vol. 2.0 (Bit Records)

=== Singles / EPs ===
- 2000 - Carlo Web - Free Noise (Track Production)
- 2006 - Tarquini & Prevale ft. Mr J Carry - In My Dreams (Original Mix) (Smilax Publishing)
- 2007 - Tarquini & Prevale ft. Mr J Carry - Sognami (Original Mix) (Bit Records)
- 2007 - Tarquini & Prevale - Never Meet (Bit Records)
- 2009 - Tarquini & Prevale vs. Vodka - Gamepad (Main Mix) (Bit Records)
- 2009 - Tarquini & Prevale vs. AlMa - Ritual Tibetan (Fluida Records)
- 2009 - Prevale & Candiolo Hotel - Dolcenera (Track Production)
- 2009 - Prevale vs. AlMa - New Year's Day (Fluida Records)
- 2009 - Underworld ft. Sky - My Sunshine (Main Mix) (Bit Records)
- 2009 - Tarquini & Prevale Made In Italy - Lovetime (Bit Records)
- 2009 - Tarquini & Prevale ft. DJ Power - My Love Is In The Air (Bit Records)
- 2009 - Basic Position - Kiss Me (Bit Records)
- 2010 - DJ Sanny J & Prevale - Once Again (Disco Planet Records)
- 2012 - Prevale - Lambada (El Ritmo Caliente Prevaloso) (Fluida Records)
- 2016 - Prevale - Yo Oh Yeah! (Slow Style Mix) (Plast Records)
- 2016 - Prevale ft. Flare - Echi (Slow Style Mix) (Plast Records)
- 2016 - Prevale - Profondo Rosso (Plast Records)
- 2017 - Prevale - And The Waltz Goes On (Plast Records)
- 2017 - Prevale - L'Onore e il Rispetto (Plast Records)
- 2018 - Prevale - Lambada (El Ritmo Caliente Prevaloso) (Plast Records)
- 2018 - Prevale ft. Desi - Happy Christmas 'War is Over' (Bit Records)
- 2019 - Prevale - So Much for Singing (Plast Records)
- 2020 - Prevale - La Serenissima (Plast Records)

=== Remixes ===
- 2001 - Progetto Z - Sogno Ipnotico (Carlo Web Remix) (Track Production)
- 2006 - Tarquini & Prevale ft. Mr. J Carry - In My Dreams (Resonator Mix) (Bit Records)
- 2007 - Emi - Le Canzoni Dell'Estate (Tarquini & Prevale vs. Reddj Remix) (Radio m2o)
- 2007 - Elektra Forward - Love Delight (Tarquini & Prevale Vision) (Gateway Multimedia)
- 2007 - Bloodhound Gang - The Bad Touch (Tarquini & Prevale Made In Italy Remix) (Geffen Records)
- 2007 - Made In Italy - Never Meet (Tarquini & Prevale Italo Mix) (Bit Records)
- 2009 - Gianna Nannini - I Maschi (Prevale Remix) (BMG Ricordi)
- 2009 - Khrys ft. Pol Rossignani - Here (Tarquini & Prevale Mix) (Planeta Mix Records)
- 2010 - The Black Eyed Peas - I Gotta Feeling (Carlo Prevale Dance Concept) (Fluida Records)
- 2011 - Prevale vs. Ann Lee - 2 Times (Prevaloso Tanz Remix) (Energy Production)
- 2011 - Prevale vs. Daniele Meo - Adesso Balla (Prevaloso Tanz Remix) (Armonica Records)
- 2011 - Prevale ft. Emi - Le Canzoni Dell'Estate (Ti Batte Il Cuore Mix) (Radio m2o)
- 2011 - Prevale ft. Jovanotti - Il Più Grande Spettacolo Dopo Il Big Bang (Io e Te Mix) (Universal Music)
- 2012 - Prevale ft. Jovanotti - Tensione Evolutiva (Pioggia e Vento Mix) (Universal Music)
- 2013 - Prevale vs. The Soundlovers - Surrender (Discotecoso Mix) (Do It Yourself)
- 2013 - Will Sparks - Ah Yeah! (Prevale Edit) (House Of Fun)
- 2013 - Prevale & Kim Lukas - Let It Be The Night (Prevale Remix) (Zomba Records)
- 2013 - TJR (DJ) - Ode To Oi (Prevale Edit) (London Records)
- 2013 - Molella - Discotek People (Prevale Remix) (Liquid Sound)
- 2014 - Sagi Rei - L'Amour Toujours (I'll Fly With You) (Prevale Remix) (Media Records)
- 2014 - Regina & Rafael Lelis - Wanna Be Free (Prevale Remix) (Dmn Records)
- 2014 - Prevale vs. 20 Fingers ft. Roula - Like It (Boom Ba Da Da Mix) (ZYX Music)
- 2014 - The Chainsmokers - #Selfie (Prevale Edit) (Dim Mak Records)
- 2014 - Deorro ft. DyCy - Five Hours Don't Hold Me Back (Prevale Mix) (Armada Music)
- 2015 - Prezioso vs. Fabri Fibra - Alza Il Volume (Prevale Remix) (Time Records)
- 2016 - Club Dogo - Chissenefrega 'In Discoteca' (Prevale Remix) (Universal Music)
- 2016 - Bloodhound Gang - The Bad Touch (Prevale Remix) (Geffen Records)
- 2016 - Hotel Saint George - Un Angelo Blu (Prevale Remix) (Made in Etaly)
- 2016 - Katerfrancers - Lei Che Lo Vuole (Prevale Remix) (Flat Frog)
- 2016 - Brothers ft. Ranieri - Dieci Cento Mille (Prevale Remix) (Melodica)
- 2016 - Kat Dahlia - Gangsta (Prevale Remix) (Sony Music Entertainment)
- 2016 - Céline Dion - Loved Me Back To Life (Prevale Remix) (Sony Music Entertainment)
- 2017 - Francesco Gabbani - Occidentali's Karma (Prevale Remix) (BMG Rights Management)
- 2018 - Ian Carey ft. Michelle Shellers - Keep On Rising (Prevale Remix) (Spinnin' Records)
- 2018 - Betta Lemme - Bambola (Prevale Remix) (X-Energy Records)
- 2018 - DJ Kass - Scooby Doo Pa Pa (Prevale Remix) (Ultra Records)
- 2018 - Clean Bandit ft. Demi Lovato - Solo (Prevale Remix) (Atlantic Records UK)
- 2018 - Takagi & Ketra ft. Giusy Ferreri & Sean Kingston - Amore e Capoeira (Prevale Remix) (Sony Music Entertainment)
- 2018 - Becky G ft. Bad Bunny - Mayores (Prevale Remix) (Kemosabe Records)
- 2019 - Kat Dahlia - Gangsta (Prevale Remix) (Sony Music Entertainment)
- 2019 - Inna - Diggy Down 'Piano Deluxe' (Prevale Remix) (Global Records)
- 2019 - Roman Flugel - Geht's Noch (Prevale Remix) (Cocoon Music Event GMBH)
- 2019 - Federico Scavo - Blow It (Prevale Remix) [Prevaloso Unz Element] (d:vision - Energy Production)
- 2020 - Prevale vs. Netzwerk - Memories (Ahi Ahi Ahi Mix) (Robyx)
- 2020 - Prevale vs. Anna - Bando (Prevaloso Energy Remix) (Universal Music)
- 2020 - Billie Eilish - Bad Guy (Prevale Remix) (Darkroom/Interscope Records)
- 2020 - Lewis Capaldi - Someone You Loved (Prevale Remix) (Universal Music GMBH)
- 2020 - AronChupa & Little Sis Nora - The Woodchuck Song (Prevale Remix) (Sony Music Entertainment Sweden AB)
- 2020 - LA Vision & Gigi D'Agostino - Hollywood (Prevale Remix) (Time Records)
- 2020 - Master KG ft. Nomcebo - Jerusalema (Prevale Remix) (Warner Music France)
- 2020 - Prevale vs. Lizot - Candlelight (Prevaloso Concept) (Sony Music Entertainment Germany GmbH)
- 2020 - Prevale vs. Gigi D'Agostino - La Passion (ZYX Music GmbH)
- 2020 - Prevale vs. Piotta ft. Il Muro del Canto - 7 Vizi Capitale [Suburra] (La Grande Onda S.r.l.)
- 2020 - Jennie from Blackpink - Solo (Prevale Remix) (YG Entertainment Inc.)
- 2020 - Prevale vs. Gigi D'Agostino - Wellfare (Media Songs S.r.l.)
- 2021 - Prezioso vs. Fabri Fibra - Alza Il Volume (Prevale Mix) (Time Records)
- 2021 - Alfons & B3nte - Hot Like A Megan 'Ha Ha Ha' (Prevale Edit) (Amuse)
- 2021 - Adele - Someone Like You (Prevale Mix) (XL Recordings Ltd.)
- 2021 - Nesli - La Fine (Prevale Mix) (Carosello Records)
- 2021 - Billie Ray Martin - Your Loving Arms (Prevale Remix) (Warner Music)
- 2021 - Lorenzo Jovanotti - Ti Porto Via Con Me (Prevale Remix) (Universal Music)
- 2021 - Prevale vs. Röyksopp - Here She Comes Again (Warner Music)
- 2021 - Alfons - Glitch (Prevale Edit) (Amuse)
- 2021 - Alfons - Cederick Digoi (Prevale Edit) (Amuse)
- 2021 - Alfons - Jamrock Land (Prevale Edit) (Universal Music)
- 2021 - The Roop - Discoteque (Prevale Mix) (Warner Music)
- 2021 - Prevale vs. Rooftime - It's All About (Prevaloso Mix) (Austro Music)
- 2021 - AronChupa & Little Sis Nora - Rave in the Grave (Prevale Edit) (Sony Music Entertainment Sweden AB)
- 2021 - Little Sis Nora - MDMA (Prevale Mix) (Sony Music Entertainment Sweden AB)
- 2021 - Prevale vs. Zero Assoluto - Svegliarsi la Mattina (Universo)
- 2021 - Prevale vs. Anna - Drippin' in Milano (Universal Music)
- 2021 - Prevale vs. Katerfrancers - Dolce & Gabbana (Flat Frog)
- 2021 - Prevale vs. Ne-Yo - What If (Motown Records)
- 2021 - Prevale vs. Adele - Easy On Me (Columbia Records)
- 2021 - Prevale vs. Akon - Right Now ' Na Na Na ' (Universal Music)
- 2021 - Prevale vs. The Kid Laroi & Miley Cyrus - Without You (Columbia Records)
