= List of number-one hits of 2001 (Austria) =

This is a list of the Austrian Singles Chart number-one hits of 2001.

Issue date	Song	Artist
7 January	"La Passion"	Gigi D'Agostino
14 January	"La Passion"	Gigi D'Agostino
21 January	"Stan"	Eminem featuring Dido
28 January	"Stan"	Eminem featuring Dido
4 February	"Stan"	Eminem featuring Dido
11 February	"Stan"	Eminem featuring Dido
18 February	"Super"	Gigi D'Agostino & Albertino
25 February	"Super"	Gigi D'Agostino & Albertino
4 March	"Daylight in Your Eyes"	No Angels
11 March	"Daylight in Your Eyes"	No Angels
18 March	"Daylight in Your Eyes"	No Angels
25 March	"Daylight in Your Eyes"	No Angels
1 April	"Daylight in Your Eyes"	No Angels
8 April	"Butterfly"	Crazy Town
15 April	"Teenage Dirtbag"	Wheatus
22 April	"Teenage Dirtbag"	Wheatus
29 April	"Teenage Dirtbag"	Wheatus
6 May	"Teenage Dirtbag"	Wheatus
13 May	"Teenage Dirtbag"	Wheatus
20 May	"Whole Again"	Atomic Kitten
27 May	"Whole Again"	Atomic Kitten
3 June	"Whole Again"	Atomic Kitten
10 June	"Whole Again"	Atomic Kitten
17 June	"Angel"	Shaggy featuring Rayvon
24 June	"Angel"	Shaggy featuring Rayvon
1 July	"Angel"	Shaggy featuring Rayvon
8 July	"Angel"	Shaggy featuring Rayvon
15 July	"Angel"	Shaggy featuring Rayvon
22 July	"Angel"	Shaggy featuring Rayvon
29 July	"Angel"	Shaggy featuring Rayvon
5 August	"Angel"	Shaggy featuring Rayvon
12 August	"Follow Me"	Uncle Kracker
19 August	"Follow Me"	Uncle Kracker
26 August	"Oua Oua"	Max.Brothers. featuring Kanui & Lulu
2 September	"Oua Oua"	Max.Brothers. featuring Kanui & Lulu
9 September	"Oua Oua"	Max.Brothers. featuring Kanui & Lulu
16 September	"Oua Oua"	Max.Brothers. featuring Kanui & Lulu
23 September	"There Must Be an Angel"	No Angels
30 September	"There Must Be an Angel"	No Angels
7 October	"Can't Get You Out of My Head"	Kylie Minogue
14 October	"Can't Get You Out of My Head"	Kylie Minogue
21 October	"Can't Get You Out of My Head"	Kylie Minogue
28 October	"Can't Get You Out of My Head"	Kylie Minogue
4 November	"Can't Get You Out of My Head"	Kylie Minogue
11 November	"Can't Get You Out of My Head"	Kylie Minogue
18 November	"Can't Get You Out of My Head"	Kylie Minogue
25 November	"Can't Get You Out of My Head"	Kylie Minogue
2 December	"Because I Got High"	Afroman
9 December	"Because I Got High"	Afroman
16 December	"I Believe"	Bro'Sis
23 December	"I Believe"	Bro'Sis
30 December	"I Believe"	Bro'Sis

== See also ==
- 2001 in music
