= L'Amour toujours II =

Studio album by Gigi D'Agostino
- Released: 16 December 2004 (US)
- Genres: Pop; trance
- Label: Media Italy

Gigi D'Agostino chronology
L'Amour toujours (1999)	L'Amour toujours II (2004)	Lento Violento ...e altre storie (2007)

L'Amour toujours II is the third studio album by Italian DJ Gigi D'Agostino, released on 16 December 2004 through Media Italy Records. It is a sequel to his 1999 album L'Amour toujours.

== Track listing ==
=== Side one ===
1. "Welcome to Paradise (Gigi d'Agostino's Way)"
2. "Angel (Gigi d'Agostino's Way)"
3. "Total Care (Vision2)"
4. "Wellfare (Elettro Gigi Dag)"
5. "The Rain (Gigi d'Agostino's Way)"
6. "Together in a Dream (Elettro Gigi Dag)"
7. "Goodnight (Gigi d'Agostino's Way)"
8. "I Wonder Why (Vision 5)"
9. "Sonata (Gigi & Luca Trip)"
10. "Complex"
11. "Silence (To Comprehend the Conditioning)"
12. "Nothing Else"
13. "On Eagle's Wings"
14. "L'Amour toujours (I Wish Real Peace)"
15. "Another Way (In spiaggia al tramonto)"

=== Side two ===
1. "Canto Do Mar" (Gigi d'Agostino Pescatore Mix)
2. "Summer of Energy" (Viaggio Mix)
3. "Marcetta"
4. "Percorrendo (Gigi's Impression)"
5. "Gigi's Way (Andando altrove)"
6. "Tangology"
7. "Momento Contento"
8. "Dance 'n' Roll"
9. "Paura e nobiltà" (Ribadisco Mix)
10. "Bolero"
11. "Angel (Elettro Gigi Dag)"
12. "The Rain (Vision 3)"
13. "Total Care (Elettro Gigi Dag)"
14. "Imagine (Gigi d'Agostino's Way)"
15. "Toccando le Nuvole (Gigi's Impression)"

== Charts ==
Chart performance for L'Amour toujours II
Chart (2004–2005)	Peak position
Austrian Albums (Ö3 Austria)	6
German Albums (Offizielle Top 100)	65
