= Gin Lemon =

EP by Gigi D'Agostino
- Released: 1997 (Italy)
- Genre: Electronic
- Length: 1:13:29
- Label: BXR/Media
- Producer: Gigi D'Agostino

Gigi D'Agostino chronology
Le Voyage Estate (1996)	Gin Lemon (1996)	Tanzen (1999)

Gin Lemon is an EP by Italian DJ Gigi D'Agostino. It was released in 1997 through BXR/Media Records.

== Track listing ==
1. "Gin Lemon"
2. "Terapia"
3. "Tuttobene"
4. "Locomotive"
5. "Rumore Di Fondo"
6. "My Dimension"
7. "Bam"
8. "Gin Tonic"
9. "Psicadelica"
10. "All In One Night"
11. "Wondering Soul"
12. "Living in Freedom"
13. "Music (An Echo Deep Inside) RMX"
