= Nihilistic penguin =

Viral 2026 meme

In January 2026 a clip taken from a clip of Encounters at the End of the World was shared on various social media including Instagram, TikTok and X (formerly known as "Twitter") becoming a widespread meme which was dubbed as "nihilistic penguin". The meme later became a sort of anti-conformist symbol, and a version was shared on social media by the Second Trump Administration during the Greenland crisis.

== History ==
=== Background ===
At one point in Werner Herzog's 2007 documentary Encounters at the End of the World an Adélie penguin leaves its pack and, disoriented, starts to head towards a mountain that is approximately 70 km (43 mi) inland. The scene closes as the narrator, Herzog himself, remarks how this is a voyage towards certain death for the penguin.

The rise in popularity of the meme, according to the Daily Sabah, seems to be tied to a general sentiment that has already been portrayed by other forms of media such as movies, mythology and literary media.

== Popularity ==
The clip started to become viral in January 2026 when it was reposted under various different contexts on Instagram, TikTok and X (formerly known as Twitter). The clip became popular with people linking it to the act of "walking away from the noise" or "from the pack". This translated in people using the penguin as some kind of "philosophical token" to criticize real life problems and attitudes through parodic means, such as to criticize the fear of some humans to leave "their 9-5 jobs" or simply a generalized "rebellion" against society.

The penguin has also been used for promotional materials due to its popularity, for example by FC Barcelona.

The clip is usually shared with an organ version of Gigi D'Agostino's song "L'Amour toujours”.

== Use in politics ==
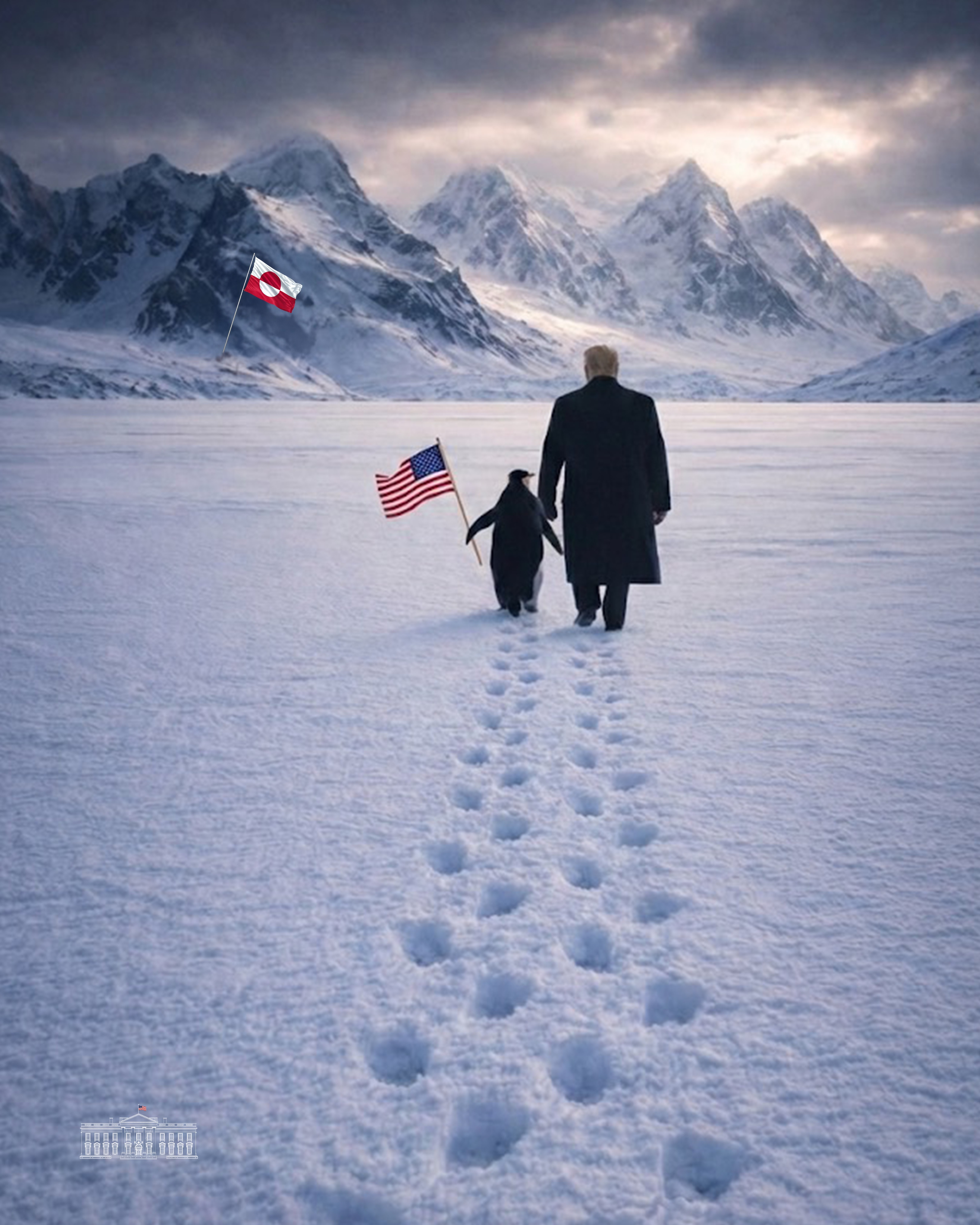
An image posted by the White House on 23 January 2026 during the Greenland crisis, showing Donald Trump walking along with a penguin carrying a US flag with a Greenlandic flag in the background. Penguins live in Antarctica, not in Greenland. The image seems to replicate the viral meme.

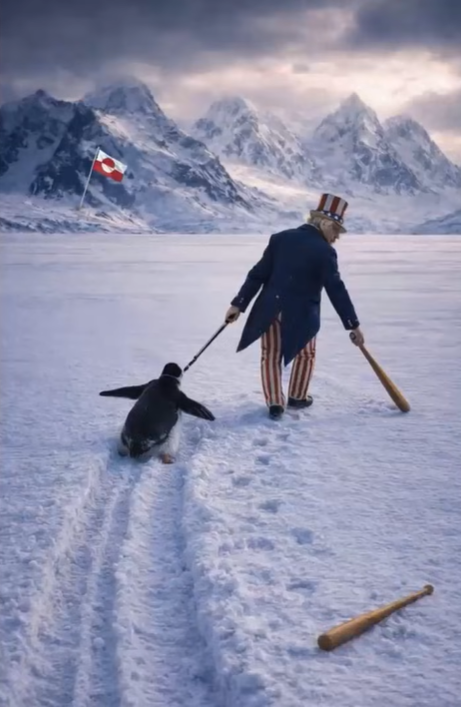
A screenshot of the video posted by Chinese journalists mocking the usage of the "nihilistic penguin" by the Trump Administration in regard to the Greenland crisis

On 23 January 2026, Donald J. Trump posted an AI generated image on Truth Social mimicking the viral meme, showing himself walking along with a penguin carrying a US flag with a Greenlandic flag in the background. The image was in the wider context of the Greenland crisis. The post gained much criticism online.

After the use of the meme by U.S. President Donald J. Trump, Xinhua, the official press of the People's Republic of China, openly mocked the AI image and the usage of the meme. The state-run news agency mocked the fact that Trump had included a penguin in an Arctic context, where it did not belong, and the political usage of the meme. As a response Chinese journalists posted and reposted an AI generated video of Trump, dressed as Uncle Sam, dragging by force an exhausted penguin on a leash.
