= Tecno Fes Vol. 2 =

EP by Gigi D'Agostino
- Released: 12 July 2000 (US)
- Genre: Electronica, dance
- Length: 77:10
- Label: Zyx

Gigi D'Agostino E.P. chronology
Tecno Fes (2000)	Tecno Fes Vol. 2 (2000)	Underconstruction 1: Silence (2003)

Professional ratings
Review scores
Source	Rating
AllMusic	3/5 stars

Tecno Fes Vol. 2 (labeled as just Tecno Fes on the spine) is an extended play by Italian DJ Gigi D'Agostino. It was released on Zyx Records in 2000.

== Track listing ==
Composed by D'Agostino, Jacno, Montagner, and Sandrini. Performed by D'Agostino and Rectangle.

1. "Amorelettronico" – 7:19
2. "La Passion" – 6:44 (medley with Rectangle)
3. "Un Giorno Credi" – 5:59
4. "Souvenir" – 8:00
5. "You Spin Me Round (Like a Record)" – 4:16
6. "Le Serpent" – 4:48
7. "Cada Vez" – 7:26 (only available in some countries)
8. "L'Amour Toujours" – 6:25
9. "Sottosopra" – 3:55
10. "Baci & Abbracci" – 4:49
11. "Tecno Fes" – 4:34
12. "Tanzen" – 3:37
13. "La Passion" – 6:00 (medley with Rectangle)

== Charts ==
=== Weekly charts ===
Chart (2000–2001)	Peak position
Austrian Albums (Ö3 Austria)	1
French Albums (SNEP)	40
German Albums (Offizielle Top 100)	95
Hungarian Albums (MAHASZ)	18
Italian Albums (FIMI)	14

=== Year-end charts ===
Chart (2001)	Position
Austrian Albums (Ö3 Austria)	25
