= M2o =

Italian electronic music radio station

Radiom2o

Programming
- Format: Electronic dance music

Ownership
- Owner: Gruppo Editoriale L'Espresso, EXOR (Agnelli)

Links
- Webcast: Windows Media
- Website: www.m2o.it

Radio m2o (stylized "radiom2o") is Italy's main 24-hour electronic music radio station, owned by the Gruppo Editoriale L'Espresso, ultimately owned by Exor (the Agnelli-family). It was founded in 2002. The station plays dance, EDM, trance, techno, house and sometimes urban music, among various others.

The station is broadcast free to air on Hot Bird and digital television channel 715.

== Speakers ==
- Albertino
- Ale Lippi
- Andrea Mattei
- Enrico Sisma
- Fargetta
- Filippo Grondona
- Giancarlo Cattaneo
- Molella
- Patrizia Prinzivalli
- Prezioso
- Shorty
- Wad
- Walter Pizzulli
- Marlen Pizzo
- Eradis

== Ex DJs ==
- Alberto Dandolo
- Andrea Bertolini
- Danijay
- David Guetta
- D Lewis
- DJ Manolo
- In Da House's Crew: (Marani e Montsaint, Christian Marras, Elio Milani, Sergio Matina, Francesco Farfa, Mattei e Omich)
- Emix
- Fabio Terry
- Big Fish
- Gabry Ponte
- Gigi D'Agostino
- Joe T Vannelli
- Joy Kitikonti
- Francesco Tarquini
- La Noche Escabrosa's Crew: (Alex Benedetti, Andreino, Angelino, Boosta, Fabrizio Gucciardi, Filippo Nardi, Giuliano Veronese, Luca Agnelli, Luckino, Paolo Martini, Pasta Boys, Ricky Montanari, Ciuffo, Frankie P, Gianni Coletti, Gianni Morri, Mauro Ferrucci, Stefano Gambarelli)
- Molella
- Onirika
- Orazio Fatman
- Paolo Prosperini
- Prevale
- Prezioso
- Saretta
- Simone LP
- Stefano Gamma
- The Stunned Guys
- The UMC Crew: (Victor Montsaint, Carlo Marani, Elio Milani, Jay-X, Sergio Matina, Splashfunk, Patrizio Mattei, Danny Omich, Christian Marras, Francesco Farfa, Francesco Zappalà, Marco Bonucci)
- Timo Maas
- Vanni G
- Wender

== Programs ==
- m2o Diabolika Paolo Bolognesi, D Lewis, Emix, Simone Lp, Emanuele Inglese)
- Amazing show (hosted by Promise Land) (since 2011)
- A qualcuno piace happy (hosted by Pippo Lorusso and Dj Osso) (since 2014)
- A qualcuno piace presto (hosted by Simone Girasole, Sabrina Ganzer, Federico Riesi, Elisabetta Sacchi, Pippo Lorusso, and La Fiore) (since 2011)
- A State of Trance (hosted by Armin Van Buuren) (since 2008)
- Bom dia m2o (hosted by Stefano Meloccaro e Sabrina Ganzer) (since 2014)
- Boulevard Robiony (hosted by Chiara Robiony) (since 2007)
- Controtendance (hosted by Dino Brown) (since 2014)
- Dual Core (hosted by Dino Brown) (since 2006)
- Elektrozone (hosted by Manuela Doriani) (since 2015)
- G.D.C.-Girls Dj Club (hosted by Chiara Robiony and Renée La Bulgara) (since 2006)
- Gamepad – La Consolle Virtuale (hosted by Tarquini & Prevale) (since 2010, currently hosted by Fabio Amoroso and Mila)
- Global (hosted by Carl Cox) (since 2010)
- Juno 106 (hosted by Motel Connection) (since 2011)
- Kunique (since 2009)
- m2o @ Ibiza (hosted by Leandro Da Silva) since 2014)
- m2o Club Chart (hosted by Molella) (since 2008), currently (hosted by Patrizia Prinzivalli)
- m2o in HD (hosted by Alex Nocera and Fabio De Vivo) (since 2011)
- m2o / musica allo stato puro (hosted by Luca Martinelli) (since 2009)
- m2o Party (hosted by Andrea Mattei, Renée La Bulgara and Fabio Amoroso) (since 2011)
- Main room (since Sarah Main) (since 2011)
- Mario & the city (hosted by Mariolina Simone) (since 2011)
- Memories - Il DJ Set Aforismatico (hosted by Prevale) (since 2013)
- Millybar (hosted by Milly De Mori) (since 2006)
- Music Zone (hosted by Provenzano DJ, Leandro Da Silva and Manuela Doriani) (since 2016)
- No Stress (hosted by Marcello Riotta) (since 2009)
- Real Trust (hosted by Roberto Molinaro) (since 2004)
- ReMemo (hosted by Datura and Principe Maurice) (since 2011)
- Slave to the Rhythm (hosted by Joe T Vannelli) (since 2011)
- Something for the weekend (hosted by Sabrina Ganzer and Micol Ronchi)
- Soul Cookin' (hosted by Massimiliano Troiani) (since 2009)
- Soundzrise (hosted by Andrea Rango) (since 2008)
- Stardust (hosted by Paolo Bolognesi) (since 2002)
- Sunday Morning (hosted by Chiara Robiony and Monsieur Marteaux) (since 2014)
- Supalova (hosted by Joe T Vannelli) (since 2011)
- The Bomb (hosted by Dj Ross) (since 2008)
- Tiesto's Club Life (hosted by Tiësto) (since 2008)
- To The Club (since 2009)
- Trance Evolution (hosted by Andrea Mazza) (since 2005)
- Urban Drop (hosted by Davide Borri) (since 2017)
- Vonyc Sessions (hosted by Paul van Dyk) (since 2009)

== Programs no longer transmitted ==
- Amoroso's Beach (hosted by Fabio Amoroso) (2006)
- Beatbox (2009)
- Bip! (2002–2007)
- Cnn da strada (hosted by Davide Borri) (2008–2014)
- Daylight (hosted by Renée La Bulgara)
- House Deelay (2009–2011)
- Chemical Area (2002–2008)
- Prezioso in action (hosted by Giorgio Prezioso (2007)
- Passworld (hosted by Henry Pass and Paolo Bolognesi) (2008)
- Provenzano Dj Show featuring Manuela Doriani (hosted by Provenzano DJ and Manuela Doriani) (2008)
- Dance and Love (hosted by Gabry Ponte) (2009–2010)
- Elektroset (2005–2010)
- Fuck Me! I'm Famous (hosted by David Guetta) (2009–2010)
- Gabry2o (hosted by Gabry Ponte) (2007–2010)
- Glo Glo Glo!! (hosted by Dino Brown and Alberto Remondini) (2012)
- Joynight (hosted by Henry Pass, Carlo Marani, Victor Monstsaint, Danny Omich, Patrizio Mattei) (2012)
- Joycafe (hosted by Henry Pass, Carlo Marani, Victor Monstsaint, Danny Omich, Patrizio Mattei) (2012)
- I FedEly del Weekend (hosted by Elisabetta Sacchi, Federico Riesi and Prevale) (2013)
- La fine del mondo (hosted by Fabio De Vivo and Selvaggia Lucarelli) (since 2013) renamed Stanza Selvaggia
- Glam (2009–2012)
- Gli Improponibili (2005–2006)
- Hashtag m2o (2015–2016)
- Il cammino di Gigi D'Agostino (hosted by Gigi D'Agostino) (2005–2009)
- I'm 2o (2010–2011)
- In Da House (2005–2008)
- Kick off - m2o nel Pallone (hosted by Tarquini & Prevale) (2005–2006)
- La Noche Escabrosa (2007–2010)
- Love 2 Love (2007)
- M To Go (2002–2010)
- m2 All Shock (2006–2008)
- m2o Diabolika (2003–2010)
- m2-Factory (2002–2003)
- m2o Clubwave (2002–2003)
- m2o Cube (2007–2008)
- m2on-line (2002–2009)
- m2o The Dance Night (2005)
- Mena Meno (con Fabio Amoroso, Dino Brown, Mariolina Simone) (2009–2011)
- Mib-Movie in Black (2005–2006)
- My Day (2008–2009)
- Mollybox (hosted by Molella) (2010–2015)
- Out of Mind Live|Out of Mind (hosted by Provenzano DJ) (2002–2008)
- Planet Perfecto (hosted by Paul Oakenfold) (2010–2011)
- Pop-Up (2008–2011)
- Pure Seduction (2002–2008)
- Quello che mi piace (hosted by Gigi D'Agostino) (2009)
- s2on (2007–2008)
- Showroom (2009–2010)
- Shut Up! (2002–2005)
- Song Selecta (2006–2010)
- Speed (2006–2007)
- Stardust Weekend (2002–2005)
- The Clash (hosted by Provenzano DJ and Promise Land) (since 2008–2011)
- The Switch (2007–2010)
- The Untouchbles (2008)
- Trance Around The World (hosted by Above & Beyond) (2008–2012)
- Tribe (2002–2009)
- Underground Music Club (2009–2010)
- Unique (2004–2006)
- Zero Db (hosted by Andrea Mazza) (2002–2015)
