= Prevale =

Prevale may refer to:

== Locations ==
- Prevale, Litija, a settlement in Municipality of Litija, Slovenia
- Prevale (Žalna), a hamlet of Žalna in the Municipality of Grosuplje, Slovenia
- Prevale, a valley south of Mount Lamovšek in Palčje in the Municipality of Pivka, Slovenia
- Prevale, a valley south of Kaludernik Hill in Kal in the Municipality of Pivka, Slovenia
- Prevale, a valley southwest of Jamno in the Municipality of Bednja, Varaždin County, Croatia

== People ==
- Prevale (DJ), Italian disc jockey, record producer, remixer, and radio host
