= Chartsengrafs =

Chartsengrafs may refer to:

- "Chartsengrafs", a song by Grandaddy from their 2000 album The Sophtware Slump
- "Chartsengrafs", a song by Gigi D'Agostino from his 2001 album Il grande viaggio di Gigi D'Agostino Vol. 1
