= Some Experiments =

Compilation album by Gigi D'Agostino
- Released: 27 March 2006
- Genre: Electronic / Dance
- Length: 2:38:00
- Label: NoiseMaker / Media Records

Gigi D'Agostino compilation chronology
Disco Tanz (2005)	Some Experiments (2006)	The Essential Gigi D'Agostino (2009)

Some Experiments is the ninth compilation album compiled and remixed by Italian DJ Gigi D'Agostino, released on 27 March 2006 through NoiseMaker records.

== Track listing ==
=== CD 1 ===
1. Dottor Dag – "Lo sbaglio" (Quaglio Mix) – 4:55
2. Lento Violento Man – "Gigi's Love" – 4:47
3. La tana del suono – "Raggatanz" – 3:26
4. Dottor Dag – "Luce (Risparmio Mix)" – 2:06
5. Gigi D'Agostino – "Con te partirò (Bozza Grezza)" – 5:28
6. Gigi D'Agostino – "Don't Cry Tonight" – 5:35
7. Il Folklorista – "The Final Countdown" – 5:43
8. Gigi D'Agostino – "Thank You For All" – 2:40
9. Gigi D'Agostino – "The Way (Gigi Live 2005)" – 4:54
10. Gigi D'Agostino – "La Passion (Gigi Live 2005)" – 4:21
11. Gigi D'Agostino – "Ancora insieme" – 4:21
12. Dance 'N' Roll – "Stay (Gigi Dag From Beyond)" – 6:17
13. Il Folklorista – "Those Were The Days (Su le mani)" – 5:23
14. Love Transistor – "Hold On" – 2:53
15. Tocco Scuro – "Cold Wind (Gigi D'Agostino Dark)" – 4:20
16. Gigi D'Agostino – "Again" – 2:53
17. Love Transistor – "Wherever" – 3:46
18. Noise Of Love – "The Only One" – 4:04

=== CD 2 ===
1. Gigi D'Agostino – "I Wonder Why (Non giochiamo FM)" – 2:58
2. Dottor Dag – "Lo sbaglio (Quaglio Tanz)" – 4:16
3. Lento Violento Man – "Rugiada" – 4:27
4. Officina Emotiva – "Natural (Solo musica)" – 2:54
5. Dottor Dag – "Luce (Spreco Mix)" – 3:12
6. Lento Violento Man – "Pigia pigia" – 3:36
7. Gigi D'Agostino – "Don't Cry Tonight (Gigi & Luca Tanz)" – 5:23
8. Orchestra Maldestra – "Tecno Uonz (Gigi Uonz)" – 3:46
9. Gigi D'Agostino – "Semplicemente (Legna Mix)" – 3:40
10. Lento Violento Man – "Tresca losca" – 4:20
11. Dottor Dag – "Non giochiamo" – 4:38
12. Lento Violento Man – "Manovella (Demo scemo)" – 4:09
13. Uomo Suono – "Unilaterale (Ambientale)" – 5:08
14. Uomo Suono – "Mas Fuerte" – 6:41
15. Orchestra Maldestra – "Tecno Uonz (Mondello & D'Agostino Tanz FM)" – 3:34
16. Gigi D'Agostino – "Pensando" – 3:25
17. Gigi D'Agostino – "Semplicemente (Non giochiamo)" – 4:35
18. Onironautti – "Raggi di sole" – 4:19
19. Onironautti – "Rodamon" – 2:54

=== Remixes ===
The album features remixes of a number of popular songs:

- "Con te partirò (Bozza Grezza)" is a cover of the Andrea Bocelli song "Con te partirò"
- "Don't Cry Tonight" is a cover of the Savage song of the same name
- "The Final Countdown" is a cover of the Europe song of the same name
- "The Way (Gigi Live 2005)" samples the Fastball song "The Way"
- "La Passion (Gigi Live 2005)" samples the Jacno song "Rectangle"
- "Those Were The Days (Su le mano)" is a cover of Mary Hopkin song "Those Were The Days"
- "The Only One" samples the Angels Never Cry song "Close Your Eyes"
- "Manovella (Demo scemo)" samples the Stefan Küchenmeister song "Guagua"

== Chart performance ==
Chart	Peak position	Source
Italian Albums Chart	19	
Austrian Albums Chart	45	
