= Tecno =

Tecno may refer to:

- Tecno brega, a form of music from Brazil
- Tecno Fes, extended play by electronica and dance music DJ Gigi D'Agostino
- Tecno (motorsport), Italian racing car constructor
- Tecno Mobile, a Chinese phone company

== See also ==
- Techno
