= Il programmino di Gigi D'agostino =

Compilation album by Gigi D'Agostino
- Released: September 2, 2003
- Genre: Dance
- Length: 157:10
- Label: NoiseMaker / Media Records

Gigi D'Agostino compilation chronology
Il grande viaggio di Gigi D'Agostino Vol. 1 (2001)	Il programmino di Gigi D'agostino (2003)	Benessere 1 (2004)

Il programmino di Gigi D'agostino (English: The Little Programme of Gigi D'Agostino) is the third compilation album by Italian DJ Gigi D'Agostino, released in 2003 through NoiseMaker / Media Records.

== Track listing ==
=== Disc one ===
1. Exch Pop True - "Discoteca" – 5:20
2. DeVision - "Drifting Sideways" – 3:53
3. Naommon - "I'm Not Ashamed" – 5:53
4. Soulkeeper - "Deeper" – 3:23
5. Jay-Jay Johanson - "On The Radio" – 6:12
6. Wolfsheim - "The Sparrows and the Nightingales" – 6:45
7. DeVision - "Digital Dream" – 5:47
8. Wolfsheim - "It's Not Too Late" – 6:13
9. The Twins - "Face To Face Re Recorded Version" – 5:03
10. Lio Amoureaux - "Solitaires" – 3:33
11. Ken Laszlo - "Inside My Music" – 5:28
12. Gigi D'Agostino - "Noi Adesso E Poi" – 7:43
13. Gigi D'Agostino - "Bla Bla Bla (Blando Mix)" – 6:13
14. Gianfranco Bortolotti & Gigi D'Agostino - "Forrest Gump Suite" – 6:19

=== Disc two ===
1. Gigi D'Agostino - "Hymn" – 6:58
2. Egiziano - "Clocks" – 6:39
3. Paul Van Dyk - "For an Angel" – 6:42
4. Gigi D'Agostino - "Taurus" – 4:06
5. Nebular B - "Liquid" – 6:39
6. Gigi D'Agostino - "Caffé" – 4:17
7. Brinton McKay - "1K Digit Disco" – 6:18
8. Gigi D'Agostino - "Passa" – 3:29
9. Gigi D'Agostino - "Troppo" – 5:34
10. Gigi D'Agostino - "Egiziano" – 3:46
11. Mr X & Mr Y - "New World Order" – 6:08
12. Gigi D'Agostino - "Fomento" – 9:39
13. Allure - "No More Tears" – 9:10
