= Ultratop 50 number-one hits of 2001 =

These hits topped the Ultratop 50 in 2001.

| Date | Artist | Title |
|---|---|---|
| January 6 | Big Brother De Bewoners & Walter Grootaers | "Een brief voor Kerstmis" |
| January 13 | Twarres | "Wêr bisto" |
| January 20 | Twarres | "Wêr bisto" |
| January 27 | Twarres | "Wêr bisto" |
| February 3 | LeAnn Rimes | "Can't Fight the Moonlight" |
| February 10 | LeAnn Rimes | "Can't Fight the Moonlight" |
| February 17 | Gigi d'Agostino | "La Passion" |
| February 24 | Gigi d'Agostino | "La Passion" |
| March 3 | Gigi d'Agostino | "La Passion" |
| March 10 | Gigi d'Agostino | "La Passion" |
| March 17 | Gigi d'Agostino | "La Passion" |
| March 24 | Shaggy & Rikrok | "It Wasn't Me" |
| March 31 | Shaggy & Rikrok | "It Wasn't Me" |
| April 7 | Shaggy & Rikrok | "It Wasn't Me" |
| April 14 | Shaggy & Rikrok | "It Wasn't Me" |
| April 21 | Wheatus | "Teenage Dirtbag" |
| April 28 | Wheatus | "Teenage Dirtbag" |
| May 5 | Wheatus | "Teenage Dirtbag" |
| May 12 | Vanda Vanda | "Sunshine After the Rain" |
| May 19 | Vanda Vanda | "Sunshine After the Rain" |
| May 26 | Vanda Vanda | "Sunshine After the Rain" |
| June 2 | Geri Halliwell | "It's Raining Men" |
| June 9 | Geri Halliwell | "It's Raining Men" |
| June 16 | Geri Halliwell | "It's Raining Men" |
| June 23 | Geri Halliwell | "It's Raining Men" |
| June 30 | Shaggy featuring Rayvon | "Angel" |
| July 7 | Shaggy featuring Rayvon | "Angel" |
| July 14 | Shaggy featuring Rayvon | "Angel" |
| July 21 | Shaggy featuring Rayvon | "Angel" |
| July 28 | K3 | "Tele-Romeo" / "Blub, ik ben een vis" |
| August 4 | K3 | "Tele-Romeo" / "Blub, ik ben een vis" |
| August 11 | K3 | "Tele-Romeo" / "Blub, ik ben een vis" |
| August 18 | K3 | "Tele-Romeo" / "Blub, ik ben een vis" |
| August 25 | K3 | "Tele-Romeo" / "Blub, ik ben een vis" |
| September 1 | K3 | "Tele-Romeo" / "Blub, ik ben een vis" |
| September 8 | Atomic Kitten | "Eternal Flame" |
| September 15 | Eve featuring Gwen Stefani | "Let Me Blow Ya Mind" |
| September 22 | Eve featuring Gwen Stefani | "Let Me Blow Ya Mind" |
| September 29 | Alicia Keys | "Fallin'" |
| October 6 | Kylie Minogue | "Can't Get You Out of My Head" |
| October 13 | Kylie Minogue | "Can't Get You Out of My Head" |
| October 20 | Kylie Minogue | "Can't Get You Out of My Head" |
| October 27 | Kylie Minogue | "Can't Get You Out of My Head" |
| November 3 | Kylie Minogue | "Can't Get You Out of My Head" |
| November 10 | Kylie Minogue | "Can't Get You Out of My Head" |
| November 17 | Afroman | "Because I Got High" |
| November 24 | Afroman | "Because I Got High" |
| December 1 | Afroman | "Because I Got High" |
| December 8 | Afroman | "Because I Got High" |
| December 15 | Afroman | "Because I Got High" |
| December 22 | Afroman | "Because I Got High" |
| December 29 | Kate Winslet | "What If" |

== See also ==
- 2001 in music
