= Lento Violento ...e altre storie =

Studio album by Gigi D'Agostino
- Released: 27 April 2007
- Genre: Electronic; dance; lento violento
- Label: NoiseMaker / Media Records

Gigi D'Agostino chronology
L'Amour toujours II (2004)	Lento Violento ...e altre storie (2007)	Lento Violento Man, Musica che pesta (2007)

Lento Violento ...e altre storie is a double CD album by Gigi D'Agostino, released on 27 April 2007.

== Track listing ==
=== CD 1 ===
1. "E Di Nuovo Cambio Casa"
2. "Impressioni Di Settembre (Bozza Grezza)"
3. "L'Uomo Sapiente"
4. "Gigi's Love (Volando)"
5. "Vorrei Fare Una Canzone (Gigi D'Agostino Tanz)" (with Magic Melodien)
6. "Ginnastica mentale F.M."
7. "Please Don't Cry (Gigi D'Agostino F.M. Tanz)" (with the Love Family)
8. "Passo Folk" (by Lento Violento Man)
9. "Lo Sbaglio (Orgoglio Mix)"
10. "Arcobaleno"
11. "Solo In Te (Gigi D'Agostino F.M. Trip)" (with Ludo Dream)
12. "Ho Fatto Un Sogno (F.M.)"
13. "Gioco Armonico"
14. "Viaggetto" (with the Love Family)
15. "Stand by Me (Gigi D'Agostino & Luca Noise Trip)" (with the Love Family)
16. "Il Cammino (Gigi D'Agostino F.M. Tanz)" (with Dimitri Mazza)
17. "Ginnastica Mentale"
18. "Un Mondo Migliore"
19. "Lo Sbaglio (Teatro Mix)"

=== CD 2 ===
1. "Ininterrottamente"
2. "Capatosta" (by Lento Violento Man)
3. "Pietanza" (by Lento Violento Man)
4. "Oscillazione Dag" (by Lento Violento Man)
5. "Passo Felino" (by Lento Violento Man)
6. "Endis" (by Lento Violento Man)
7. "Tira E Molla" (by La Tana del Suono)
8. "Raggi Uonz" (by Lento Violento Man)
9. "La Batteria Della Mente" (by Lento Violento Man)
10. "Passo Folk (Marcia Tesa)" (by Lento Violento Man)
11. "Legna Degna (F.M.)" (by Lento Violento Man)
12. "Tordo Sordo" (by Lento Violento Man)
13. "Please Don't Cry (Gigi D'Agostino Tanz)" (with the Love Family)
14. "Ho Fatto Un Sogno"
15. "Un Mondo Migliore (B Side)"
16. "Voyage" (Assaggio Mix)

== Charts ==
Chart performance for Lento Violento ...e altre storie
Chart (2007)	Peak position
Austrian Albums (Ö3 Austria)	56
Italian Albums (FIMI)	3
