= L'Amour toujours (album) =

Studio album by Gigi D'Agostino
- Released: 21 August 1999
- Genre: Eurodance; house; Italo dance
- Length: 125:36
- Label: Arista; NoiseMaker; ZYX (single-disc version only)

Gigi D'Agostino chronology
Gigi D'Agostino (1996)	L'Amour toujours (1999)	L'Amour toujours II (2004)

Singles from L'Amour toujours
- 1. "Elisir" Released: 1998; 2. "Cuba Libre" Released: 1998 - (as GG D'Ag); 3. "Movimento" Released: 1998 - (as Noise Maker); 4. "Bla Bla Bla" Released: 17 May 1999; 5. "Another Way" Released: 31 July 1999; 6. "The Riddle" Released: December 1999; 7. "La Passion" Released: 8 October 2000; 8. "L'Amour toujours (I'll Fly with You)" Released: July 2000

Professional ratings
Review scores
Source	Rating
AllMusic	2/5 stars

L'Amour toujours is the second studio album by Italian DJ Gigi D'Agostino, released in 1999. The album was released on two discs, titled "Chansons for the Heart" and "Beats for the Feet" respectively. The United States release only contains "Chansons for the Heart", with a slightly different track list. "Another Way", "L'Amour toujours (I'll Fly with You)", "The Riddle", "La Passion" and "Bla Bla Bla" were released as singles. "L'Amour toujours (I'll Fly with You)" reached number 78 on the US Billboard Hot 100 in September 2001. In addition, the album reached number nine on the Billboard Dance/Electronic Albums chart in 2001. A sequel titled L'Amour toujours II was released five years later.

== Track listing ==
=== CD 1 – Chansons for the Heart ===
1. "Another Way" – 6:02
2. "L'Amour toujours (I'll Fly with You)" – 6:56
3. "Elisir" – 5:33
4. "The Riddle" – 4:44 (originally by Nik Kershaw)
5. "La Passion" – 7:35
6. "The Way" – 6:42 (originally by Fastball)
7. "Star" – 5:23
8. "Bla Bla Bla" (Drammentenza Mix) – 6:32
9. "L'Amour" – 3:31
10. "Music" – 6:52
11. "Passion" – 4:59
12. "Bla Bla Bla" – 4:15

=== CD 2 – Beats for the Feet ===
1. "La Dance" – 4:53
2. "Movimento" – 4:53
3. "La Marche Electronique" – 5:16
4. "Cuba Libre" – 4:41
5. "My Dimension" – 6:36
6. "The Riddle" (Instrumental) – 4:05 (originally by Nik Kershaw)
7. "Tekno Jam" – 9:49
8. "Coca e Avana" – 3:18
9. "Bla Bla Bla" (Dark Mix) – 5:38
10. "Elektro Message" – 3:51
11. "Fly" – 5:15

=== CD 1 – Chansons for the Heart ===
1. "Another Way" – 6:02
2. "L'Amour toujours (I'll Fly with You)" – 6:56
3. "Elisir" – 5:33
4. "The Riddle" – 4:44 (originally by Nik Kershaw)
5. "La Passion" (Medley With Rectangle) – 7:35
6. "The Way" – 6:42 (originally by Fastball)
7. "Star" – 5:23
8. "Gin Lemon" (Extended Mix) – 5:48
9. "L'Amour" – 3:31
10. "Music" – 6:52
11. "Rectangle" – 4:59 (same track as "Passion")
12. "Bla Bla Bla" – 4:15

=== CD 2 – Beats for the Feet ===
1. "La Danse" – 4:53
2. "Movimento" – 4:53
3. "La Marche Electronique" – 5:16
4. "Cuba Libre" – 4:41
5. "My Dimension" – 6:36
6. "The Riddle" (Instrumental) – 4:05 (originally by Nik Kershaw)
7. "Tekno Jam" – 9:49
8. "Coca e Havana" – 3:18
9. "Bla Bla Bla" (Dark Mix) – 5:38
10. "Elektro Message" – 3:51
11. "Bla Bla Bla" (Drammentenza Mix) – 6:32

=== US release ===
1. "Another Way" – 6:02
2. "I'll Fly With You (L'Amour toujours)" – 6:56
3. "Elisir" – 5:33
4. "The Riddle" – 4:44 (originally by Nik Kershaw)
5. "La Passion" [Medley with Rectangle] – 7:35
6. "The Way" – 6:42 (originally by Fastball)
7. "Star" – 5:23
8. "L'Amour" – 3:31
9. "Music" – 6:52
10. "Rectangle" – 4:59 (same track as "Passion")
11. "Bla Bla Bla" – 4:15
12. "Bla Bla Bla" (Dark Mix) – 5:38

== Chart performance ==
=== Weekly charts ===
Chart (1999–2002)	Peak position
Austrian Albums (Ö3 Austria)	1
Belgian Albums (Ultratop Flanders)	16
Danish Albums (Hitlisten)	30
Dutch Albums (Album Top 100)	3
German Albums (Offizielle Top 100)	10
Hungarian Albums (MAHASZ)	18
Italian Albums (FIMI)	25
Swiss Albums (Schweizer Hitparade)	53

=== Year-end charts ===
Chart (2000)	Position
Austrian Albums (Ö3 Austria)	1
German Albums (Offizielle Top 100)	34

Chart (2001)	Position
Austrian Albums (Ö3 Austria)	15
German Albums (Offizielle Top 100)	97

Chart (2002)	Position
Belgian Albums (Ultratop Flanders)	59
Dutch Albums (Album Top 100)	25

=== Certifications ===
Region	Certification	Certified units/sales
Austria (IFPI Austria)	3× Platinum	150,000^{*}
Germany (BVMI)	Platinum	500,000^{^}
Italy (FIMI)	Platinum	100,000^{*}
Netherlands (NVPI)	Gold	50,000^{^}
Poland (ZPAV)	Gold	35,000^{*}
^{*} Sales figures based on certification alone.^{^} Shipments figures based on certification alone.
