= Laboratorio 1 =

Compilation album by Gigi D'Agostino
- Released: September 2004
- Genre: Dance
- Length: 72:58
- Label: NoiseMaker / Media

Gigi D'Agostino compilation chronology
Benessere 1 (2004)	Laboratorio 1 (2004)	Laboratorio 2 (2005)

Laboratorio 1 is the fifth compilation album by Italian DJ Gigi D'Agostino, released in September 2004 through NoiseMaker / Media Records.

== Track listing ==
1. Molto Folk - "Canto Do Mar" [Gigi D'Agostino Pescatore Mix]
2. Gigi D'Agostino - "Complex" [Breve Ma Intenso]
3. DJ Pandolfi - "Main Title/The Kiss" [Gigi D'Agostino & Pandolfi Mix]
4. Elettrogang - "Once Upon a Time"
5. Luca Noise - "Traffico" [Gigi D'Agostino & Luca Noise Mix]
6. Gigi D'Agostino - "The Rain" [Gigi D'Agostino & Pandolfi Mix]
7. Limmatstreet - "Precious Little Diamond"
8. Gigi D'Agostino - "Sonata" [Cantando Ballando]
9. La Tana Del Suono - "Nascendo"
10. Gigi D'Agostino - "Voyage"
11. Molto Folk - "Love"
