= Disco Tanz =

Compilation album by Gigi D'Agostino
- Released: 7 December 2005
- Genre: Electronic / Dance / Progressive house
- Length: 2:35:00
- Label: Noise Maker

Gigi D'Agostino compilation chronology
Laboratorio 3 (2005)	Disco Tanz (2005)	Some Experiments (2006)

Disco Tanz is the eighth compilation album compiled and remixed by Italian DJ Gigi D'Agostino, released in 2005 through Noise Maker records.

== Remixes ==
The album features remixes of a number of popular songs:

- "Memories" is based on the Kim Wilde song "Cambodia".
- "Like a Prayer" is a cover of the Madonna single of the same name.
- "Moonlight Shadow" is a remix of the Mike Oldfield single of the same name.
- "Parole Parole" is a cover of the Dalida and Alain Delon duet "Paroles, paroles".
- "Those Were the Days" is a cover of the Mary Hopkin UK number one single of the same name, lyrics originally by Eugene Raskin.
- "Natural" contains excerpts from Mozart's "Rondo Alla Turca".
- "Espana Cani" is a cover of "España cañí", a famous instrumental Spanish piece of paso doble music by Pascual Marquina Narro.
- "Cammino Contento" features a remix of the Russian folk song "Korobeiniki", widely known as the "Tetris Theme".
- "Fasten Your Seatbelt" features excerpts from the Pendulum single of the same name.

== Track listing ==
=== CD 1 ===
1. Dottor Dag - "Lo Sbaglio "(Groviglio Mix) - 5:49
2. Dos - "Memories" - 6:59
3. Federico Romanzi - "Luna Park" - 2:36
4. Orchestra Maldestra - "Tecno Uonz" - 4:26
5. Onironauti - "Tanzeria" - 5:54
6. Officina Emotiva - "Contaminando" (Uomo Suono Trip) - 3:44
7. Officina Emotiva - "Like a Prayer" (Gigi Dag & Luca Noise Trip) - 5:27
8. Dottor Dag - "Non Sono Un Santo" - 4:52
9. Luca Noise - "Moonlight Shadow" (Gigi Dag & Luca Noise Trip) - 4:20
10. Dance 'N' Roll - "Stay" (Tentando Mix) - 4:02
11. Double S vs 2 Daniels - "Parole Parole" (Gigi D'Agostino Tanz) - 5:11
12. Il Folklorista - "Those Were the Days" (Gigi Dag & Luca Noise) - 5:53
13. Gigi D'Agostino - "I Wonder Why" (Gigi Dag From Beyond) - 7:00
14. Dottor Dag - "Luce" (Raggio di Sole) - 4:00
15. La Tana Del Suono - "Marcia Lenta" - 5:20

=== CD 2 ===
1. Gigi D'Agostino - "I Wonder Why" (Non Giochiamo) - 6:02
2. Officina Emotiva - "Natural" (Gigi Dag & Luca Noise a Passeggio) - 6:01
3. Uomo Suono - "Monolitico" - 7:42
4. Woofer - "Fiesta Don't Stop" - 6:04
5. Il Folklorista - "Espana Cani" - 3:34
6. Uomo Suono - "Bilaterale" - 4:02
7. Orchestra Maldestra - "Carica Tremenda" (Gigi Dag & Luca Noise) - 5:08
8. Uomo Suono - "Cammino Contento" - 7:50
9. Orchestra Maldestra - "Fasten Your Seatbelt" (Gigi Dag & Luca Noise Trip) - 5:15
10. Gigi D'Agostino - "I Wonder Why" (Gigi Dag From Beyond F.M.) - 3:30
11. Orchestra Maldestra - "Carica tremenda" (Gigi Dag & Pandolfi) - 5:34
12. Gigi D'Agostino - "I Wonder Why" (Gigi Dag From Beyond....To Live) - 5:56
13. Luca Noise - "Trip Trance" - 5:43
14. Dj Pandolfi - "Movimento Quotidiano "(F.M.) - 3:15
15. Dj Pandolfi - "Movimento Quotidiano" - 4:04
