= Ola Onabule =

British-Nigerian singer-songwriter

Ola Onabulé
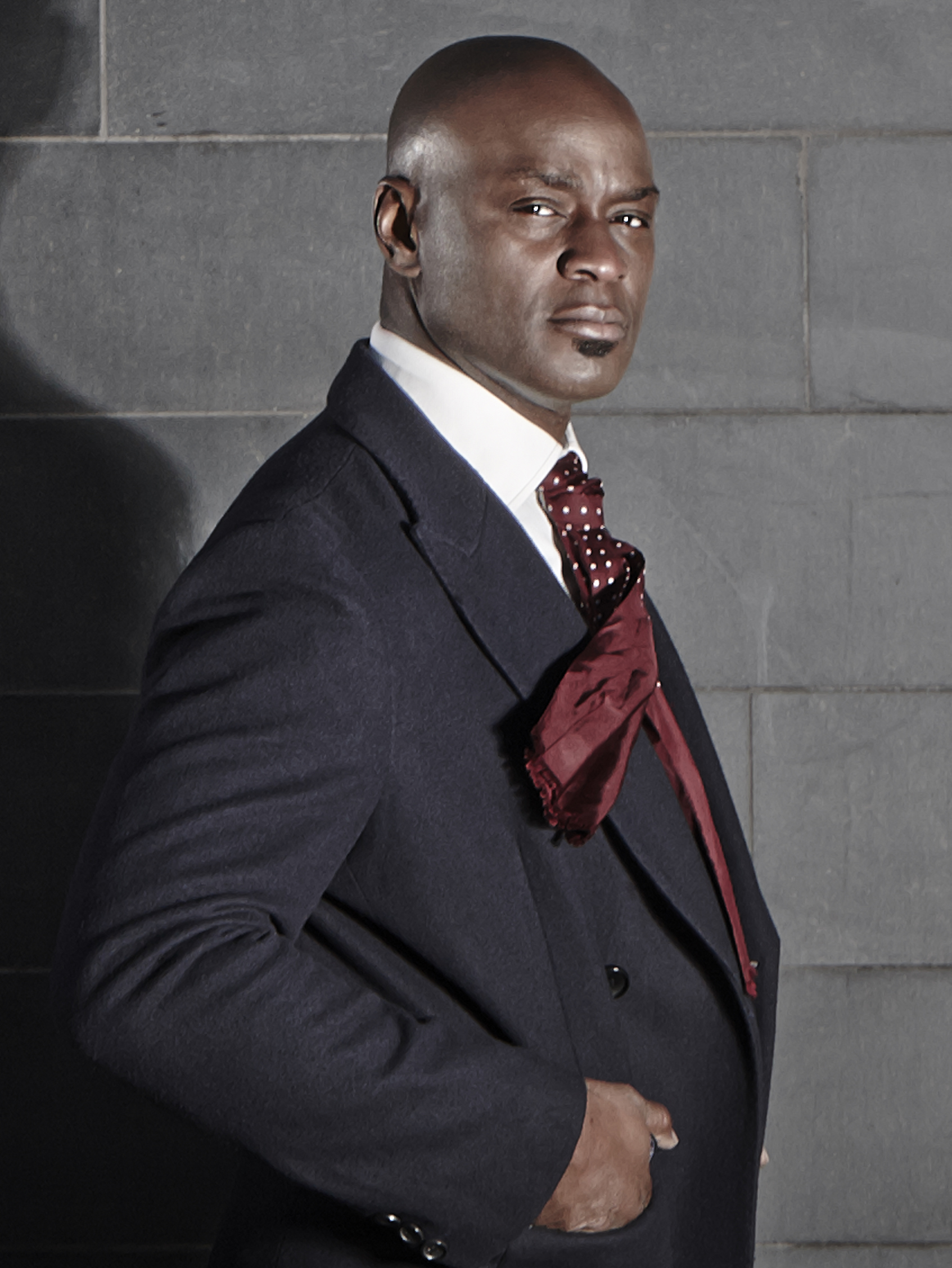

Background information
- Born: Islington, London, England
- Genres: Jazz, world, soul
- Occupations: Musician, singer, songwriter
- Label: Rugged Ram
- Website: ola-onabule.co.uk

Ola Onabulé is a British-Nigerian singer-songwriter.

== Background ==
Ola Onabulé was born in Islington, London. At the age of seven he moved to Lagos, Nigeria, where he spent the next ten years in school. At seventeen he returned to the UK to study at Millfield School. From there he attended law school, almost completing a three-year degree before deciding to enroll at Middlesex Polytechnic for an arts degree. While studying, he began to perform in London clubs and venues, writing and performing his own material.

== Music career ==
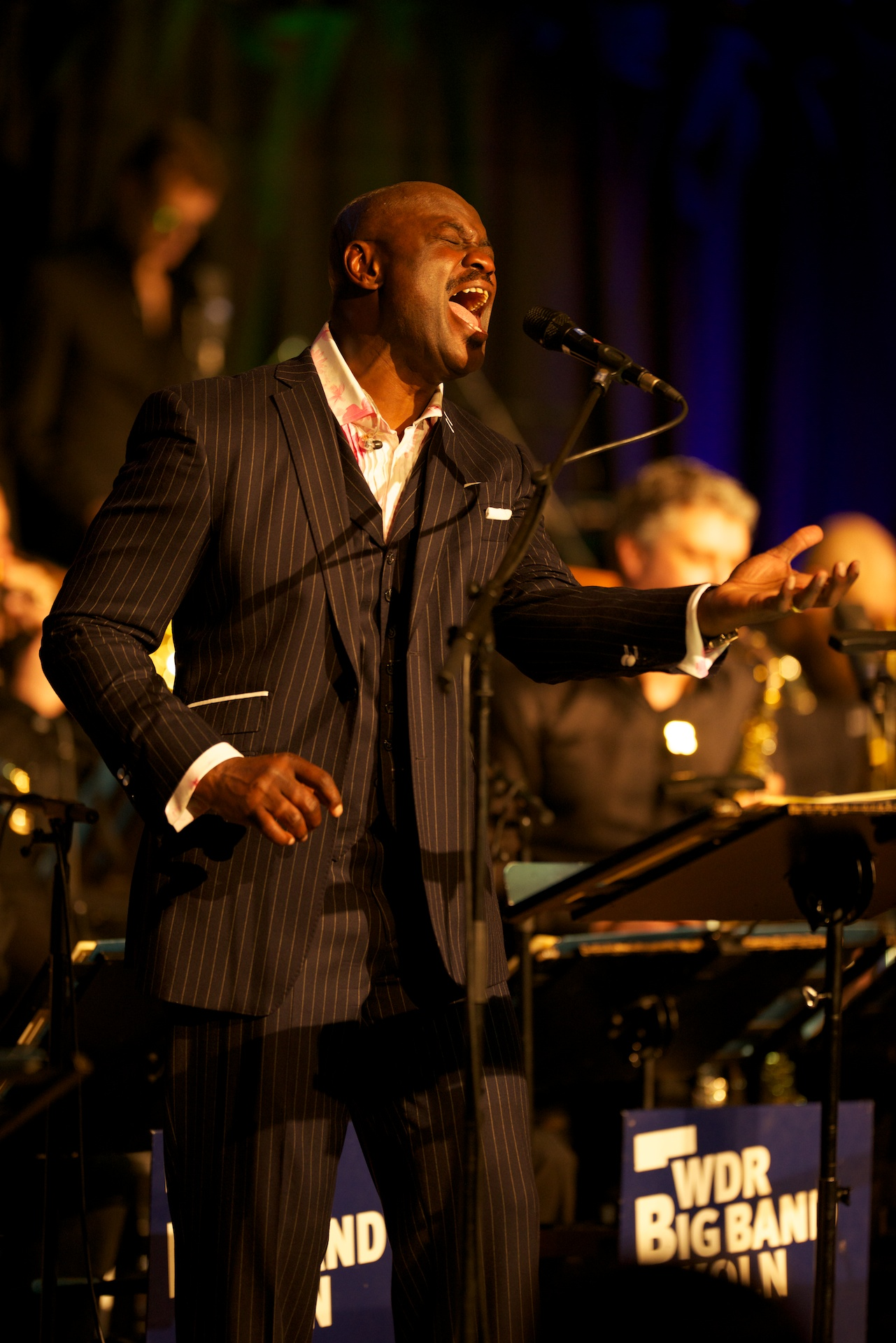
Ola Onabule with the WDR Big Band 2013

Onabule has had a career that spans almost two decades. He released much of his music on his own label, Rugged Ram Records, after recording for Elektra and Warner Bros. His first album, More Soul Than Sense, was released in 1995.

Onabulé is featured as the uncredited vocalist for Gigi D'Agostino's 1999 dance hit L'amour toujours.

Ola Onabulé has performed internationally at some of the world's most prestigious jazz festivals and concert halls. Since 2009, he has appeared with the German big bands WDR Big Band and the SWR Big Band. He appeared with the German Film Orchestra Babelsberg in Potsdam for a concert at the Nikolaisaal featuring arrangements of his material by Peter Hinderthür.

In July 2009, he appeared on the main stage of the Montreal Jazz Festival in 2009 and Vancouver Jazz Festival.

In December 2009, he co-headlined a series of dates with South African jazz singer, Sibongile Khumalo entitled Soul Noel. The show travelled around the UK leading up to Christmas. The shows featured a band with choir led by arranger and conductor Kevin Robinson. The series of shows came to the attention of the BBC and he was invited to be a guest on the BBC TV program Soul Noel, which also featured Beverley Knight.

In June 2010, Onabulé returned to Canada and performed at Victoria Jazz Festival on the main stage, Vancouver Jazz Festival at the Commodore Ballroom and the Edmonton Jazz Festival on the main stage as well as an appearance at the Citadel Theatre in Edmonton.

In summer 2012, Onabulé performed his first concerts in the Baltic region. He was invited to perform at Estonia's Muhu Future Music Festival and at the Saulkrasti Jazz Festival in Latvia. On this first visit to Estonia, he was introduced to the ETV Choir and performed a concert with them in a church in Saaremaa.

In December 2012 he returned for further concerts with saxophonist Villu Veski and the ETV Girls' Choir. He also performed a concert in the Charles' Church, Tallinn, which was produced and filmed by ETV. The concert was broadcast in December 2012 on ETV and in New York on 22 December 2013. In 2014 he performed a concert at the Queen Elizabeth Hall in London.

Onabulé returned to Latvia in 2013 for shows with the Mirage Jazz Orchestra. The performance at the Saulkrasti Jazz Festival was so well received that the promoters decided to bring him back in November 2013 for two shows at the Splendid Palace in Riga. In December 2013, he returned to perform for the third time with WDR Big Band Köln. The studio recording was filmed and broadcast via live streaming. The show featured the talents of German harmonica player Berthold Matschat. Two sold-out shows followed with a radio broadcast of the last show on WDR Radio.

In January 2014, Onabulé performed with the SWR Big Band for a one-hour TV special of his original material arranged by Klaus Wagenleiter. The program was filmed at the SWR Studios in Stuttgart. The first TV broadcast took place on 27 July on SWR TV 2014. In February 2014, Onabulé performed at Porgy & Bess, Vienna. On 30 April, he performed at Romania's International Jazz Day with Villu Veski and a youth jazz orchestra in Cluj Napoca. In May 2014, Onabulé performed three shows in Germany, including Sendesaal (previously home of Radio Bremen) and with a US band at the Cutting Room in New York with Lionel Cordew on drums, Jonathan Maron on bass, and Robin Macantagay on guitar. In June 2014, Onabulé appeared at the Muhu Future Music Festival with Jason Rebello on piano, Villu Veski on saxophone and Jukka Eskola on trumpet. In July 2014, Onabulé appeared at the Istanbul Jazz Festival with his six-piece band including Villu Veski and Guido May and drums.

In November 2014, Onabulé appeared in Mexico with the Orchestra of San Luis Potosí performing orchestral arrangements of his songs at the closing of Cinema Fest. Concha Buika opened the festival. He also appeared in Frankfurt with China Moses and the HR Big Band for a concert of 1920s songs which were originally performed with the WDR Big Band of Cologne. That same month Onabulé appeared at the Lagos Jazz Festival in Nigeria as the headline act. In December 2014, Onabulé appeared with his band for the first time in Nigeria at the Lagos Jazz Series mid series event at La Scala, the Muson Centre. The show elicited a great press response as well as TV and radio interviews. In December 2014, Onabulé appeared with the WDR Big Band of Cologne for a series of Christmas concerts of songs arranged for Ola Onabule by the US arranger Richard De Rosa.

On 30 April 2015, Onabulé headlined the Romania International Jazz Day closing their main event in Cluj Napoca. The tour also took in the following cities: Bucharest, Sibiu and Targu Mures. In May 2015, Onabulé song "Soul Town", from his album In Emergency, Brake Silence (2004) was given a remix. The tracks was released by DSG Music. In June 2015, Onabulé appeared with at the Imatra Jazz Festival with the Imatra Big Band inj Finland. In July that year, Onabulé appeared at the Museum Night Festival in Aschaffenburg, Germany. Also in July, Onabulé appeared Mundus Festival Casalgrande, Italy.

In September 2015, Onabulé's album It's the Peace That Deafens is released by Dot Time Records, a US label with offices in Europe. On 30 September and 1 October 2015, Onabulé was a guest artist with Diana Krall at the Royal Albert Hall. In January 2016, Onabulé appeared at Celtic Connections Festival in Glasgow. In February, Onabulé performed Concert in the Dark at Sendesaal Bremen, Germany. The concert was broadcast on Deutschland Radio Kultur.

In February 2016, Onabulé performed with the Danish Radio Big Band for the first time. He performed material from his latest album, It's The Peace That Deafens, with some songs arranged by Ed Partyka. The recording took place at the Danish Radio and Television studios in Copenhagen and was broadcast on Danish Radio. They concert was also performed in Svendbourg the following day.

In March 2016, Onabulé performed with the Big Band Jazz de Mexico at Radio at Imer Horizonte Radio Studios performing material from It's The Peace That Deafens and previous albums. He also performed with the Big Band Jazz de Mexico at Lunario d'Auditorium Nacional in Mexico City. Onabulé performed a select number of shows in the US which featured an appearance in Syracuse with CNY Jazz, Atlanta and Detroit. Onabulé also appeared at Syracuse and La Moyne University for special Lectures/interviews to present his global journey through the arts.

In April 2016, Onabulé was selected to appear at Jazz Ahead in Bremen in their main showcase event appearing with his German band featuring Patrick and Martin Scales. More German shows followed In May and June with appearances at Monchengladbach, Dorseten and Duren. On 9 July 2016 Onabulé appeared at the Arena Santa Giulliana (main stage) of Umbria Jazz Festival in Italy. The Arena stage also featured Diana Krall, Pat Metheny, Chick Corea, Ron Carter, and Brad Meldhau. In July 2016, he appeared at the Berlin Summer Jazz Series.

== Discography ==
Year	Title	Record label
1994	More Soul Than Sense	Rugged Ram
1997	From Meaning, Beyond Definition	Rugged Ram
1999	Precious Libations for Silent Gods	Rugged Ram
2001	Ambitions for Deeper Breath	Rugged Ram
2004	In Emergency, Brake Silence	Rugged Ram
2007	The Devoured Man	Rugged Ram
2011	Seven Shades Darker	Rugged Ram
2015	It's the Peace That Deafens	Dot Time
2019	PointLess	Rugged Ram
