= La musica che pesta =

Studio album by Lento Violento Man
- Released: 2007
- Genre: Electronic; dance; lento violento
- Label: NoiseMaker / Media Records

Lento Violento Man chronology
Lento Violento ...e altre storie (2007)	La musica che pesta (2007)	Suono libero (2008)

La musica che pesta (transl. The Crushing Music) is a double album by Italian DJ Gigi D'Agostino, released in 2007, under the alias "Lento Violento Man", through Media Records.

== Track listing ==
=== CD 1 ===
1. Gigi D'Agostino - "Mondo Dag 6"
2. Lento Violento Man - "The Maranza"
3. Lento Violento Man - "Quando dico"
4. Lento Violento Man - "Reparto presse"
5. Lento Violento Man - "Quoting"
6. Gigi D'Agostino - "Mondo Dag 7"
7. Lento Violento Man - "Danzaplano"
8. Lento Violento Man - "Distorsione Dag"
9. Lento Violento Man - "Vi racconto"
10. Lento Violento Man - "Dago 3"
11. Lento Violento Man"Consorzio agrario"
12. Lento Violento Man - "Costruendo"
13. Gigi D'Agostino - "Mondo Dag 5"
14. Lento Violento Man - "E la musica la pesta"
15. Lento Violento Man - "Carica lenta"
16. Lento Violento Man - "Picchia"
17. Lento Violento Man - "Puledrino"
18. Lento Violento Man - "Tempesta nella giungla"
19. Lento Violento Man - "Cicoria lessa"

=== CD 2 ===
1. Gigi D'Agostino - "Mondo Dag 9"
2. Lento Violento Man - "Zig Zag"
3. Moto Remoto - "Ascolta"
4. Lento Violento Man - "Attrezzi e accessori"
5. Mr Dendo - "Carpe Dream"
6. Lento Violento Man - "Tresca losca" (Ferramenta Mix)
7. Lento Violento Man - "Ok Man"
8. Gigi D'Agostino - "Mondo Dag 3"
9. Ultramax - "Trabacando"
10. Lento Violento Man - "Contenuto latente"
11. Lento Violento Man - "Scelta tetanica" (Una Scelta Di Vita Mix)
12. Lento Violento Man - "Zappa e aratro"
13. Moto Remoto - "Scusa"
14. Lento Violento - "Viaggio di maggio"
15. Lento Violento Man - "Batte forte"
16. Lento Violento - "Saldatrice tamarra"
17. DJ Pandolfi - "Hablando"
18. Lento Violento Man - "Ferro fetente"
19. Zeta Reticuli - "Taranza"

== Charts ==
Chart performance for La musica che pesta
Chart (2007)	Peak position
Italian Albums (FIMI)	21
