= Gigi D'Agostino (album) =

1996 studio album

Studio album by Gigi D'Agostino
- Released: 1996
- Genre: Electronic
- Length: 71:50

Gigi D'Agostino chronology
A Journey into Space (1994)	Gigi D'Agostino (1996)	L'Amour Toujours (1999)

Singles from Gigi D'Agostino
- 1. "Sweetly" Released: February 1996

Gigi D'Agostino is the debut studio album by Italian DJ Gigi D'Agostino. The album was released in 1996.

== Track listing ==
1. "Gigi D'Agostino"
2. "Emotions"
3. "Before"
4. "Angel's Symphony"
5. "Sweetly"
6. "Love & Melody"
7. "My Dream"
8. "Strange"
9. "Purezza"
10. "Fly"
11. "Elektro Message"
12. "Singin"
13. "Free"
14. "Gigi's Violin"
15. "Another Theme"
16. "Special Track"
17. "Melody Voyager"
18. "Harmonic"
19. "Song for My Future"

== Chart performance ==
The single "Sweetly" was released in February 1996 and was listed in the Dutch Singles Chart for six weeks, peaking at position 19.
