= Il grande viaggio di Gigi D'Agostino Vol. 1 =

Compilation album by Gigi D'Agostino
- Released: 17 December 2001 (Germany)
- Genre: Dance
- Length: 84:49
- Label: NoiseMaker / Media

Gigi D'Agostino compilations chronology
Le Voyage Estate (1996)	Il grande viaggio di Gigi D'Agostino Vol. 1 (2001)	Il programmino di Gigi D'agostino (2003)

Il grande viaggio di Gigi D'Agostino Vol. 1 (transl. The Great Journey of Gigi D'Agostino, Volume 1) is the second compilation album by Italian DJ Gigi D'Agostino, released on 17 December 2001 through NoiseMaker / Media Records.

== Track listing ==
1. "The House of God" – 1:58
2. "Name of the Game" – 2:51
3. "Cosmic Pop" – 4:02
4. "Rapture" – 2:32
5. "Zora" – 3:16
6. "Rheinkraft" – 2:16
7. "Heart Operation" - Free the Primitive – 2:31
8. "Control Freaq" – 2:01
9. "The 15Th" – 3:39
10. "Gigi D'agostino Natale" – 3:17
11. "Poney Part 2" – 4:06
12. "Sway (Mucho Mambo)" – 2:52
13. "Farilalililla" – 2:04
14. "Chartsengrafs" – 3:54
15. "Gigi Dag" – 3:43
16. "Raggattak" – 1:43
17. "Moscow Nights" – 4:09
18. "S.H.O.K.K. - Isn't It All a Little Strange" – 6:41
19. "Amorelettronico" – 2:59
20. "The Butterflies - The Butterfly" – 3:09
21. "Che cosa strana... Quasi arcana..." – 1:58
22. "Tammurriata nera" – 4:48
23. "Vitalic - You Prefer Cocaine" – 5:46
24. "Musikakeparla" – 4:12
