= Encounters at the End of the World =

2007 documentary film by Werner Herzog

- Theatrical release poster
- Directed by: Werner Herzog
- Written by: Werner Herzog
- Produced by: Henry Kaiser
- Narrated by: Werner Herzog
- Cinematography: Peter Zeitlinger
- Edited by: Joe Bini
- Music by: Henry Kaiser; David Lindley
- Production companies: Discovery Films; ThinkFilm; Image Entertainment
- Distributed by: ThinkFilm; Image Entertainment
- Release dates: September 1, 2007 (Telluride Film Festival); June 11, 2008 (United States); April 24, 2009 (United Kingdom)
- Running time: 99 minutes
- Country: United States
- Language: English
- Box office: $1.2 million

Encounters at the End of the World is a 2007 American documentary film by Werner Herzog about Antarctica and the people who choose to spend time there. It was released in North America on June 11, 2008, and distributed by ThinkFilm. At the 81st Academy Awards, the film was nominated for Best Documentary Feature.

== Synopsis ==
Filmmaker Werner Herzog and cinematographer Peter Zeitlinger travel to Antarctica to meet the people who live and work there and to capture footage of the continent's unique locations. In his narration, Herzog explains that this film will not be a typical Antarctica film about "fluffy penguins" but will instead explore the dreams of the people and the landscape.

Arriving at McMurdo Station, the two-man crew interview some maintenance and support workers and iceberg geologist Douglas MacAyeal. They travel to a nearby seal camp supervised by zoologist Olav Oftedal, then join the film's composer/producer, research diver Henry Kaiser, at a diving camp. The film then shows underwater footage shot by Kaiser. Cell biologist Samuel Bowser and zoologist Jan Pawlowski are interviewed, and after finishing their research, Kaiser and Bowser stage a rooftop guitar concert back at McMurdo.

Herzog and Zeitlinger visit Ernest Shackleton's nearby cabin, which has been preserved, unchanged, for almost a century. After some footage filmed at the South Pole, Herzog interviews penguin scientist David Ainley. He asks Ainley about penguin sexuality and mental illness. At the end of the documentary, Herzog captures a lone penguin that stops following its colony. Instead of heading to the sea to feed or returning to its group, the penguin turns and begins waddling toward the vast, mountainous interior of the continent facing certain death.

The filmmakers visit the active volcano Mount Erebus and interview volcanologists. As Herzog speculates about alien scientists visiting a post-human Earth, there is a sequence shot in tunnels carved deep into the ice below South Pole station, where various trinkets and mementos, including a can of Russian caviar and a whole frozen sturgeon, have been placed in carved-out shelves in the walls and preserved by the extreme cold and dry air. On the slope of Erebus, Herzog and Zeitlinger explore ice caves formed by fumaroles.

Continuing the progression into the metaphysical, the filmmakers visit the launch of a giant helium balloon used in a neutrino detection project (ANITA) and interview physicist Peter Gorham. The final word is given to a philosopher/maintenance worker at McMurdo, and the film ends with more footage from the fumarole ice caves and Kaiser's dives.

== Production ==
Herzog was drawn to Antarctica after viewing underwater footage filmed there by Henry Kaiser. He became aware of the footage when he happened to notice Kaiser showing it to a friend while working on the music for Herzog's Grizzly Man. Kaiser, a musician and diver, first went to Antarctica as part of the National Science Foundation's Antarctic Artists and Writers Program for his "Slide Guitar Around the World" project, and he returned on several scientific diving expeditions. Before Encounters at the End of the World, Herzog made prominent use of Kaiser's footage in the fiction film The Wild Blue Yonder (2005).

The film was shot in Antarctica as part of the same NSF Antarctic Artists and Writers Program that had first brought Kaiser to the continent. The entire film crew consisted of Herzog, who recorded all production sound, and cinematographer Peter Zeitlinger. The pair went to Antarctica without any opportunity to plan filming locations or interviews, and had just seven weeks to conceive the project and shoot their footage. The freewheeling nature of the time in Antarctica meant that Herzog often only met the interview subjects minutes before beginning to film them.

Filming in Antarctica is usually overseen by the NSF's media office, which approves and supervises all film productions. Because of Herzog's grant from the Artists and Writers Program, however, he was allowed to film without any minders or oversight from the NSF. This allowed him and Zeitlinger to film the "seal-bagging" footage, which is not typically deemed suitable for public release.

The audio recordings of the seals featured in the film were produced by Douglas Quin, a sound expert and professor at the S.I. Newhouse School of Public Communications at Syracuse University, and another recipient of the Antarctic Artists and Writers grant.

The film is dedicated to American film critic Roger Ebert, a supporter and friend of Herzog who had recently, in his protracted battle with cancer, lost the ability to speak.

== Release ==
The film was screened at the 2007 Telluride Film Festival, and, one week later, had its official premiere at the Toronto International Film Festival on September 10. In 2008, it was featured at the International Documentary Festival in Amsterdam, the Edinburgh International Film Festival, the Cambridge Film Festival, and the Melbourne International Film Festival. The film was shown at the Hong Kong Cultural Centre as part of the 2008 Hong Kong International Film Festival on March 28, and at the Minneapolis-St. Paul International Film Festival on April 30.

Revolver Entertainment released the film theatrically in the UK on April 24, 2009.

== Reception ==
Encounters at the End of the World received predominantly positive reviews from critics. On review aggregator website Rotten Tomatoes, it has an approval rating of 94%, based on 111 reviews, with an average rating of 7.70/10; the site's "critics consensus" reads: "Encounters at the End of the World offers a poignant study of the human psyche amid haunting landscapes." On Metacritic, the film has a weighted average score of 80 out of 100, based on reviews from 25 critics.

In early 2026, a scene from Encounters at the End of the World went viral. The scene features a penguin who leaves both the feeding and nesting grounds, and heads toward a distant mountain alone. Werner Herzog muses on the penguin's actions, and the subsequent audio of the quote became a widespread internet meme, featuring edits of the original documentary juxtaposed with other images representing themes such as resilience and nihilism.

=== Top ten lists ===
The film appeared on several critics' top ten lists of the best films of 2008, including the following:

- 1st - Carrie Rickey, The Philadelphia Inquirer
- 1st - Dennis Harvey, Variety
- 2nd - David Ansen, Newsweek
- 4th - Andrew O'Hehir, Salon
- 4th - Dana Stevens, Slate
- 4th - Peter Rainer, The Christian Science Monitor
- 8th - Manohla Dargis, The New York Times
- 9th - Michael Rechtshaffen, The Hollywood Reporter
- 10th - Andrea Gronvall, Chicago Reader
- 10th - Richard Corliss, Time magazine
- 10th - Sheri Linden, The Hollywood Reporter

== Awards ==
Encounters at the End of the World won the award for Best Documentary at the Edinburgh International Film Festival and the Special Prize at the Planet Doc Review Festival in Warsaw (both in 2008). It was nominated for Best Documentary Feature at the 81st Academy Awards, but lost the award to Man on Wire.
