= Le Voyage Estate =

Compilation album by Gigi D'Agostino
- Released: 1996 (Italy)
- Genre: Electronic
- Label: Virgin, BXR Noise Maker

Gigi D'Agostino compilations chronology
The Greatest Hits (1996)	Le Voyage Estate (1996)	Il grande viaggio di Gigi D'Agostino Vol. 1 (2001)

Le Voyage Estate is a compilation album by Italian DJ Gigi D'Agostino, released in 1996 through Virgin Records and BXR Noise Maker.

== Track listing ==
1. "Desert"
2. "Sunshine Dance"
3. "Psychic Harmonic"
4. "Ikeya Seki"
5. "Gigi's Violin"
6. "Purezza"
7. "Guitar"
8. "New Year's Day"
9. "Prophecy"
10. "Sweet Love"
11. "Elektro Message"
12. "Psicadelica"
13. "Before"
14. "Angel's Symphony"
15. "Acidismo"
16. "X-Moments Theme"
17. "Paradise"
18. "Harmosphere"
19. "Fromage Fraise"
