= Lento violento =

Style of electronic dance music

- Etymology: "Slow (and) violent"
- Other names: Lento
- Stylistic origins: Italo dance; techno; acid; hardcore; hardstyle; tribal house
- Cultural origins: Late 1990s, Italy
- Typical instruments: Synthesizer; keyboards; drum machine; sequencer; sampler

Regional scenes
- Mediterranean Sea

Local scenes
- Austria; Germany; Czech Republic; Netherlands; Spain

Lento violento, sometimes shortened to simply lento, is a style of electronic dance music that developed in Italy. Its name means slow (and) violent. Lento Violento is characterized by minimal, slow-feeling rhythmic structures and aggressive sound design, not by a fixed low BPM range. It consists of a hard kick, like the ones present in hardcore or hardstyle, but played at a very slow tempo, with vocal samples and dark and acid sounds or loops.

== Origins ==
The first tracks with the lento violento sound were "Anima Ladina" by Ottomix (1991), "Panic Mouse (stress mix)" by Gigi D'Agostino (1996), "Ibiza" by Ottomix (1998) and Alex Castelli's "Enjoy", that was co-produced by Ottomix. Although at that time, they were not called "lento violento" yet. These tracks were influenced by the more techno and trance-oriented tracks like Mauro Picotto's "Lizard", "Iguana", "Pulsar", "Tuttincoro" or "Raggattak" by Joman (Joy Kitikonti), all from the Italian BXR label.

While some individual tracks were popular in the clubs, the style itself was not established until DJ/producer Gigi D'Agostino started with a series of productions in 2003, like "Ripassa". Indeed, he coined the name for this style, and he releases most of his lento violento songs on his own label Noise Maker, using aliases like Dottor Dag, Lento Violento Man, Uomo Suono, Orchestra Maldestra, or La Tana Del Suono, to distinguish these songs from his Italo dance work.

Other artists started to create similar tracks after the success of this style. Also several compilation CDs are released with lento violento music, like the Movimentolento series.

=== Reemergence in hardstyle ===
Italian producer Technoboy, in his track "The Undersound" released in 2009, fused lento with modern hardstyle elements; while the track claims to christen the new genre "undersound", the term "lento" is still used occasionally to denominate hardstyle tracks. Technoboy himself has continued to use such motifs in his tracks like "Catfight", and the track "MF Point of Lento" by Brennan Heart and Headhunterz explicitly calls Technoboy the most prominent artist of the genre.

== See also ==
- Lento Violento Man - La Musica Che Pesta
- Lento Violento ...e altre storie
- Suono Libero
