= Super (1, 2, 3) =

Single by Gigi D'Agostino and Albertino
- B-side: "Remixes"
- Released: December 2000
- Genre: Dance music
- Length: 3:59
- Label: Arista
- Songwriters: Paolo Sandrini; Gigi D'Agostino
- Producer: Gigi D'Agostino

Gigi D'Agostino singles chronology
| "L'amour toujours" (2000) | "Super (1, 2, 3)" (2000) | "Silence" (2004) |

"Super (1, 2, 3)" is a song by Italian DJ Gigi D'Agostino in collaboration with DJ Albertino. It was released in December 2000 as a single.

== Track listing ==
1. "Super (1, 2, 3)" (Riscaldamento) - 3:59
2. "Super (1, 2, 3)" (Rassodante) - 8:11
3. "Super (1, 2, 3)" (Idratante) - 7:14
4. "Super (1, 2, 3)" (Rilassante) - 10:05

Name of song is Super (1, 2, 3), but it also known as "Une, Deux, Trois" and "Super (One, Two, Three)".

The remix song by Albertino also is in Gigi' Friends album (Riscaldamento version).

== Chart performance ==
The song reached number one in Austria, number 2 in Italy and number 4 in Belgium.

=== Weekly charts ===
| Chart (2000–2001) | Peak position |
|---|---|
| Austria (Ö3 Austria Top 40) | 1 |
| Belgium (Ultratop 50 Flanders) | 4 |
| Belgium (Ultratip Bubbling Under Wallonia) | 11 |
| France (SNEP) | 46 |
| Italy (FIMI) | 2 |
| Netherlands (Mega Top 100) | 34 |
| Poland Airplay (Music & Media) | 16 |
| Romania (Romanian Top 100) | 5 |
| Spain (AFYVE) | 3 |
| Switzerland (Schweizer Hitparade) | 55 |
