= L'Amour toujours =

2000 single by Gigi D'Agostino

Single by Gigi D'Agostino

from the album L'Amour toujours
- Released: July 2000 / October 2000
- Length: 8:45 / 6:54 (L'Amour Vision / Mixed Cut); 4:02 (Small mix)
- Label: NoiseMaker; Media
- Songwriters: Luigino Di Agostino; Carlo Montagner; Paolo Sandrini; Diego Leoni
- Producer: Gigi D'Agostino

Gigi D'Agostino singles chronology
"La Passion" (2000)	"L'Amour toujours" (2000)	"Super (1, 2, 3)" (2000)

Audio sample
- "I'll Fly with You" ("L'Amour toujours"): file; help

Music video
- Video on YouTube

"L'Amour toujours" (French: [lamuʁ tuʒuʁ]; transl. "Love Always"), also named "I'll Fly with You", is a song co-written and performed by the Italian DJ Gigi D'Agostino, with Ola Onabule singing vocals on all versions of the track. The song was released to American clubs and dance radio in July 2000. In Europe, the song was released as a single in October 2000. The song appears on D'Agostino's second studio album, L'Amour toujours (1999).

"L'Amour toujours" became an international success, topping the charts of Denmark, the Netherlands, and Romania and peaking within the top 10 in six other countries. In North America, it reached number 78 on the US Billboard Hot 100 and number 11 on the Canadian Singles Chart. The album version has a different mix, which was used as the single version in the United States and Canada, except with vocal samples from "Bla Bla Bla" added.

== Name ==
Despite the French title, the song is recorded entirely in English, and the title does not appear in the lyrics. The song's alternate title comes from its refrain.

== Music video ==
The music video for the song contains footage taken from live performances of D'Agostino performing throughout Europe at rave parties. The version used in the music video is known as the "Small Mix" and is an edit of the "L'Amour Vision" version.

== In popular culture ==
=== Usage in football ===
The track is frequently used by European football clubs as a goal celebration song. The Eredivisie club Heracles Almelo has used "L'amour toujours" as its official goaltune for several years. It is also a recurring fixture in the stadium playlists of clubs such as RSC Anderlecht, S.S. Lazio, Celtic F.C., and various teams in the Austrian and German lower leagues.

During UEFA Euro 2024, the song became a subject of significant controversy. Although originally part of the tournament's official playlist, it was pulled by UEFA and several host city organizers, including those for the Brandenburg Gate fan zone, following a viral incident on the island of Sylt. In that instance, individuals were filmed chanting xenophobic lyrics to the song's melody. To prevent the track from being used as a "background for extremist slogans," it was banned from being played over stadium speakers during matches involving the Austria national football team and the Germany national football team. Despite the ban, the melody was occasionally chanted by supporters in the stands throughout the tournament.

=== Political appropriation and reactions ===
As reported by several German media, since at least November 2023, the melody to "L'Amour toujours" has been co-opted by far-right groups in Germany, as various videos of people joining in public chants singing over the song's instrumental hook with a reprise of the anti-immigration slogan, "Ausländer raus, Ausländer raus, Deutschland den Deutschen, Ausländer raus" (Foreigners out, foreigners out, Germany for Germans, foreigners out) surfaced online. Members of the youth wing of far-right party Alternative for Germany were reportedly seen engaging in similar chants on several occasions, while the party's TikTok account started posting clips featuring the song's melody as a background theme. In response to the reports, in March 2024 German record label ZYX, who holds the copyright for "L'Amour toujours", filed a criminal complaint against unknown figures, with the charges involving hate speech and copyright infringement.

In May 2024, a retweeted video showing a group of people singing the aforementioned slogan over "L'Amour toujours" during a party at a club on Sylt, in which one man appeared to perform a Nazi salute, sparked widespread outrage; the regional police of Schleswig-Holstein opened an investigation about the case, while the clip's content was widely condemned by various political figures. D'Agostino condemned the use of his song by the far-right, and reiterated that his song is apolitical, stating that it is solely about "a wonderful, big and intense feeling that connects people," which he describes as "the power of love that inspires me to celebrate life." After the incident, the song re-entered the German singles chart at number 8.

In June 2024, Sweden Democrats politician David Lång was audiotaped by an Expressen journalist while singing "Ausländer raus, Ausländer raus" over "L'Amour toujours" during a post-electoral party for the 2024 European Parliament election in Sweden.

As a result of its use by right-wing extremist groups, the song was banned from being played at the Oktoberfest in Munich. The Austrian Football Association also decided to ban the song from being used as a stadium anthem, in order to avoid further incidents. In an interview with Kronen Zeitung, D'Agostino criticized bans of the song by radio stations and festivals, saying, "You can't stop racism by banning music."

On January 23, 2026, an organ remix of the song was used in videos posted by the United States Department of Homeland Security featuring ICE agents and the "Nihilist penguin" from Werner Herzog's Encounters at the End of the World.

=== In other media ===
The song is featured in the end credits of the 2019 film Uncut Gems, which received widespread critical acclaim. Co-director Josh Safdie explained that, over the 10-year process of making the film, "that's the song that's remained at the end since the very beginning."

== Track listing ==
Europe mixed CD maxi (2001)

1. "L'Amour toujours" (L'Amour Vision) – 6:56
2. "Un giorno credi" (gigidagostino.com) – 8:07
3. "L'Amour toujours" (gigidagostino.com) – 7:58
4. "Musikakeparla" – 6:55

== Charts ==
=== Weekly charts ===
2000–2002 weekly chart performance for "L'Amour toujours"
Chart (2000–2002)	Peak position
Austria (Ö3 Austria Top 40)	3
Belgium (Ultratop 50 Flanders)	2
Belgium (Ultratop 50 Wallonia)	27
Canada (Nielsen SoundScan)	11
Denmark (Tracklisten)	1
Europe (Eurochart Hot 100)	14
Germany (GfK)	3
Hungary (Rádiós Top 40)	7
Ireland (IRMA)	18
Italy (FIMI)	6
Netherlands (Dutch Top 40)	1
Netherlands (Single Top 100)	1
Romania (Romanian Top 100)	1
Spain (Promusicae)	7
Switzerland (Schweizer Hitparade)	25
US Billboard Hot 100	78
US Dance Club Songs (Billboard)	32
US Rhythmic Airplay (Billboard)	29

2024 weekly chart performance for "L'Amour toujours"
Chart (2024)	Peak position
Germany (GfK)	8

Weekly chart performance for "L'Amour toujours" (Tiësto edit)
Chart (2015–2016)	Peak position
Poland Airplay (ZPAV)	29
Poland (Polish Airplay New)	2
US Dance Airplay (Billboard)	4

=== Year-end charts ===
2001 year-end chart performance for "L'Amour toujours"
Chart (2001)	Position
Austria (Ö3 Austria Top 40)	29
Belgium (Ultratop 50 Flanders)	76
Canada (Nielsen SoundScan)	75
Germany (Media Control)	36
Netherlands (Single Top 100)	15
Romania (Romanian Top 100)	17

2002 year-end chart performance for "L'Amour toujours"
Chart (2002)	Position
Austria (Ö3 Austria Top 40)	49
Belgium (Ultratop 50 Flanders)	31
Canada (Nielsen SoundScan)	140
Ireland (IRMA)	93
Netherlands (Dutch Top 40)	26
Netherlands (Single Top 100)	6

Year-end chart performance for "L'Amour toujours" (Tiësto edit)
Chart (2016)	Position
US Dance/Mix Show Airplay (Billboard)	35

=== Decade-end charts ===
Decade-end chart performance for "L'Amour toujours"
Chart (2000–2009)	Position
Netherlands (Single Top 100)	8

== Certifications ==
Certifications and sales for "L'Amour toujours"
Region	Certification	Certified units/sales
Austria (IFPI Austria)	Gold	25,000^{*}
Belgium (BRMA)	Gold	25,000^{*}
Denmark (IFPI Danmark)	2× Platinum	180,000^{‡}
Germany (BVMI)	Gold	250,000^{^}
Italy (FIMI)	2× Platinum	100,000^{‡}
Netherlands (NVPI)	Platinum	60,000^{^}
Spain (Promusicae)	Gold	30,000^{‡}
Sweden (GLF) Tiësto edit	Gold	20,000^{‡}
United Kingdom (BPI)	Platinum	600,000^{‡}
^{*} Sales figures based on certification alone.^{^} Shipments figures based on certification alone.^{‡} Sales+streaming figures based on certification alone.

== Tiësto cover ==
In September 2015, Tiësto released a new edit of "L'Amour toujours" performed by Dzeko & Torres, featuring vocals by Delaney Jane.

== See also ==
- List of Romanian Top 100 number ones
