= Another Way (Gigi D'Agostino song) =

Single by Gigi D'Agostino

from the album L'Amour Toujours
- Released: 31 July 1999
- Genre: Italo dance, Eurodance
- Length: 6:03
- Label: ZYX, EMI, Arista, Noise Maker
- Songwriters: Diego Leoni; Paolo Sandrini; Gigi D'Agostino; Carlos Montagner
- Producer: Gigi D'Agostino

Gigi D'Agostino singles chronology
"Bla Bla Bla" (1999)	"Another Way" (1999)	"The Riddle" (1999)

"Another Way" is a song by Italian DJ Gigi D'Agostino. It was released in July 1999 as the fourth single from the album L'Amour Toujours. Ola Onabule is the uncredited vocalist on L'Amour Toujours.

== Music video ==
The music video was directed by Stephan Müller and Jörg Thommes, produced by company Vision Unlimited and filmed in September of 2000 at Voss Studios, in Düsseldorf, Germany. It features D'Agostino turning into a rubber faced character who looks similar to Max Headroom. He starts doing the robot dance, then tries to impress a robotic looking woman who appears. They dance together in a synchronized way, and the female robot kisses him at the end of the video. The video takes place in a 3D CGI world including designs that look like cards and machine gears.

== Formats and track lists ==
=== Germany ===
(B.I.G.; BIG 5064–12; Vinil, 12")

- Another Way (Tanzen Mix) - 7:38
- B Another Way (LP Mix) - 5:59

(Golden-Dance-Classics; GDC 2236–8; CD, Maxi-Single, Reissue)

1. Another Way (Radio Cut) - 3:30
2. Another Way (Tanzen Mix) - 7:42
3. Another Way (LP Mix) - 6:02

(ZYX Music; ZYX 9177–8; CD, Maxi-Single)

1. Another Way (Radio Cut) - 3:30
2. Another Way (Tanzen Mix) - 7:42
3. Another Way (LP Mix) - 6:02

=== France ===
(EMI Music France; 7243 8 88922 6 1; Vinyl, 12", 45 RPM, Maxi-Single)

- Another Way (Club Mix) - 7:41
- B Another Way (Radio Edit) - 3:45

(EMI Music France; 7243 8 88922 2 3; CD, Single, Cardboard Sleeve)

1. Another Way (Radio Edit) - 3:45
2. Another Way (Club Mix) - 7:41

=== Denmark ===
(Iceberg Records; ICE CDM 115; CD, Maxi-Single)

1. Another Way (Radio Cut) - 3:30
2. Another Way (Tanzen Mix) - 7:42
3. Another Way (LP Mix) - 6:02

== Charts ==
=== Weekly charts ===
Chart (2000)	Peak position
Austria (Ö3 Austria Top 40)	13
France (SNEP)	33
Germany (GfK)	16
Poland Airplay (Music & Media)	18
Switzerland (Schweizer Hitparade)	61

2025 weekly chart performance for "Another Way"
Chart (2025)	Peak position
Russia Streaming (TopHit)	95

=== Monthly charts ===
2025 monthly chart performance for "Another Way"
Chart (2025)	Peak position
Russia Streaming (TopHit)	99

=== Year-end charts ===
Chart (2000)	Position
Austria (Ö3 Austria Top 40)	26
Germany (Media Control)	79
