= Bla Bla Bla (Gigi D'Agostino song) =

1999 Single by Gigi D'Agostino

Single by Gigi D'Agostino

from the album L'Amour Toujours
- Released: 17 May 1999
- Genre: Italo house; Italo dance
- Length: 3:10 (video edit/German radio edit); 4:15 (album version)
- Label: ZYX; EMI; Arista; Noise Maker
- Songwriters: Gigi D'Agostino; Kirby Gregory
- Producer: Gigi D'Agostino

Gigi D'Agostino singles chronology
"Cuba Libre" (1999)	"Bla Bla Bla" (1999)	"Another Way" (1999)

Music video
- Video on YouTube

"Bla Bla Bla" is a song written and recorded by Italian DJ Gigi D'Agostino, released in May 1999 as the third single from his second album, L'Amour Toujours (1999). It reached number three in Austria and number 15 in France. The vocal samples are from the line "I've been thinking 'bout what you have done to me", from Stretch's 1975 single "Why Did You Do It".

== Music video ==
The song also featured a popular music video, which was directed by Andreas Hykade and Ged Haney at Studio Film Bilder GmbH, in the style of Italian animated series La Linea. The music video shows Baba, a boy with a floating head and no arms, walking toward what appears to be a fish/shark that multiplies itself and can change direction. This style was also used in "The Riddle", another song by Gigi D'Agostino, originally by British singer Nik Kershaw.

== Charts ==
=== Weekly charts ===
Weekly chart performance
Chart (1999–2002)	Peak position
Austria (Ö3 Austria Top 40)	3
Belgium (Ultratip Bubbling Under Flanders)	6
France (SNEP)	15
Germany (GfK)	4
Ireland (IRMA)	23
Netherlands (Single Top 100)	43
Scottish Singles Sales (Official Charts)	82
Switzerland (Schweizer Hitparade)	16
UK Singles (Official Charts)	87

=== Year-end charts ===
1999 weekly chart performance
Chart (1999)	Position
France (SNEP)	97

2000 weekly chart performance
Chart (2000)	Position
Austria (Ö3 Austria Top 40)	24
Europe (Eurochart Hot 100)	89
Germany (Media Control)	18

=== Decade-end charts ===
Chart (1990–1999)	Rank
Austria (Ö3 Austria Top 40)	5

== Certifications ==
Certifications and sales
Region	Certification	Certified units/sales
Austria (IFPI Austria)	Platinum	50,000^{*}
France (SNEP)	Silver	125,000^{*}
Germany (BVMI)	Gold	250,000^{^}
Italy (FIMI)	Platinum	70,000^{‡}
^{*} Sales figures based on certification alone.^{^} Shipments figures based on certification alone.^{‡} Sales+streaming figures based on certification alone.
