= La Passion =

Single by Gigi D'Agostino

from the album L'Amour Toujours
- B-side: "Remix"
- Released: 8 October 2000
- Genre: Euro-house, Italo dance
- Length: 3:00
- Label: ZYX, EMI, Arista, Noise Maker
- Songwriters: Gigi D'Agostino, Jacno
- Producer: Gigi D'Agostino

Gigi D'Agostino singles chronology
"The Riddle" (1999)	"La Passion" (2000)	"L'amour toujours" (2000)

"La Passion" is a song co-written and recorded by Italian DJ Gigi D'Agostino. It was released in October 2000 as the sixth single from his 1999 album L'Amour Toujours. It is a remix with some additional melodic variations of the song "Rectangle" by the French musician Jacno, which doesn't originally contain any vocals. Music producer and songwriter Carlo Montagner provides the vocals, which were heavily auto-tuned, as were many songs which followed Cher's trend during the early 2000s. D'Agostino has made various mixes for different albums. The song was a hit in Austria and Belgium, where it became a number 1 single.

== Music video ==
The music video was directed by Markus Stummer and begins with Gigi D'Agostino stealing a CD in a music store and running away. There are many extras in this video doing day-to-day tasks and going about their daily life. As the video progresses further, the viewpoint changes from one character to another. The video then goes into a flashback at the end that again shows D'Agostino in the music store, which means that the story continues in an infinite loop.

== Track listings ==
CD single

1. "La Passion" (medley with rectangle) (radio version) — 3:30
2. "La Passion" (medley with rectangle) (album version) — 7:35

CD maxi

1. "La Passion" (new radio cut) — 2:58
2. "La Passion" (radio cut) — 3:34
3. "L'Amour toujours" (LP mix) — 7:35
4. "Tecno fes" (E.P. II mix) — 7:04
5. "Tanzen" (E.P. mix) — 4:59

7" single

1. "La Passion" (tanzen vision) — 7:04
2. "La Passion" (medley with rectangle) — 7:35

CD maxi - Remixes

1. "La Passion" (new radio cut) — 2:58
2. "La Passion" (cielo mix) — 7:25
3. "La Passion" (radio cut) — 3:34
4. "La Passion" (l'amour toujours LP mix) — 7:35
5. "La Passion" (tecno fes E.P. mix) — 7:04
6. "La Passion" (tanzen E.P. mix) — 4:59

== Personnel ==
- Written by Gigi D'Agostino and Jacno
- Arranged and mixed by Gigi D'Agostino and Paolo Sandrini
- Executive producer: Gianfranco Bortolotti
- Produced by Gigi D'Agostino
- Vocals (uncredited) by Carlo Montagner

== Charts ==
=== Weekly charts ===
Chart (2000–2002)	Peak position
Austria (Ö3 Austria Top 40)	1
Belgium (Ultratop 50 Flanders)	1
Belgium (Ultratop 50 Wallonia)	16
France (SNEP)	18
Germany (GfK)	2
Hungary (Mahasz)	1
Ireland (IRMA)	2
Netherlands (Dutch Top 40)	13
Netherlands (Single Top 100)	12
Poland Airplay (Music & Media)	18
Romania (Romanian Top 100)	2
Spain (Promusicae)	15
Sweden (Sverigetopplistan)	49
Switzerland (Schweizer Hitparade)	13

=== Year-end charts ===
Chart (2000)	Position
Austria (Ö3 Austria Top 40)	7
Germany (Media Control)	54

Chart (2001)	Position
Austria (Ö3 Austria Top 40)	12
Belgium (Ultratop 50 Flanders)	7
Belgium (Ultratop 50 Wallonia)	63
Europe (Eurochart Hot 100)	37
Germany (Media Control)	24
Netherlands (Dutch Top 40)	27
Netherlands (Single Top 100)	70
Switzerland (Schweizer Hitparade)	78

Chart (2002)	Position
Ireland (IRMA)	10

=== Decade-end charts ===
(2000–2009)	Position
Austria (Ö3 Austria Top 40)	6
Germany (Media Control GfK)	71

== Certifications ==
Region	Certification	Certified units/sales
Austria (IFPI Austria)	Platinum	50,000^{*}
Belgium (BRMA)	Gold	25,000^{*}
Germany (BVMI)	Gold	250,000^{^}
^{*} Sales figures based on certification alone.^{^} Shipments figures based on certification alone.

== See also ==
- List of number-one hits of 2000 (Austria)
- Ultratop 50 number-one hits of 2001
