= Gigi D'Agostino =

Italian DJ (born 1967)

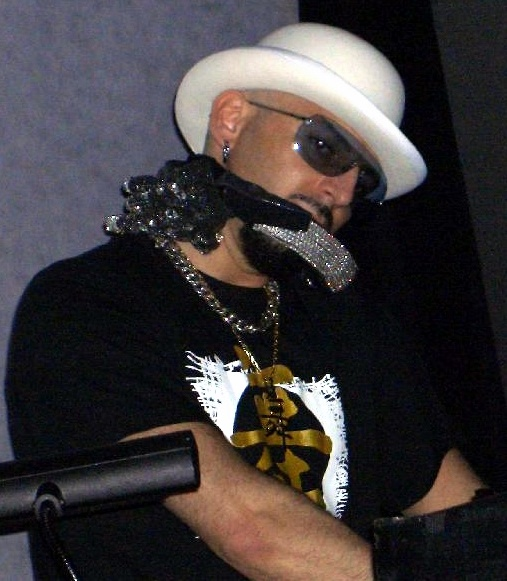
- D'Agostino performing in 2005

Background information
- Also known as: Gigi Dag; Lento Violento; Dottor Dag; Il Folklorista; Lento Violento Man; Orchestra Maldestra; Scialadance; Uomo Suono; Zarro Dag
- Born: Luigino Celestino Di Agostino; 17 December 1967 (age 58); Turin, Italy
- Genres: Italo dance; progressive trance; lento violento; house
- Occupations: DJ; producer; remixer
- Years active: 1986–present
- Labels: BXR; NoiseMaker; Popron Music; Arista; Iceberg Records; Media Records; Le Club; EMI France; Vale Music; Popron Traxx; Gigi D'Agostino Planet; Discomagic Records; Building Records; Umbrella Records; Ariola; Warner Music Group; BMG Dance; Avex Trax; ZYX
- Website: gigidagostino.com

Luigino Celestino Di Agostino (Italian pronunciation: [luiˈdʒiːno tʃeleˈstiːno di aɡoˈstiːno]; born 17 December 1967), known professionally as Gigi D'Agostino (pronounced [ˈdʒiːdʒi daɡoˈstiːno]), is an Italian DJ and music producer. In 1986, he started his career as a DJ spinning Italo disco. His biggest chart successes include "Bla Bla Bla", "Another Way", a cover of Nik Kershaw's "The Riddle", "La Passion", "Super" and "L'Amour toujours", all in the years 1999 and 2000. The hookline of "L'Amour toujours" was also used for the 2018 hit game remix/mashup "In My Mind".

== Early life and education ==
Born in Turin, Italy, on 17 December 1967, to parents from Salerno, Campania, D'Agostino spent his childhood between Turin and Brescia, where the Media Records studios are located. As a child, D'Agostino wanted to be someone in the world of disco music. Starting out by working as a stonemason and a fitter, he began his musical career as a DJ by organizing parties in clubs. His debut was in a club near Turin called "Woodstock". He also worked in a small club called Palladio in Cascinette d'Ivrea (30 km north of Turin) from 1987 until around 1992 and in a club called Le Palace in the Valentino Castle Garden in Turin. He was a resident DJ of the Italian disco Ultimo Impero from 1993 to 1998.

== Career ==
=== 1990s ===
D'Agostino's first release was Noise Maker Theme, a double-A-sided record with a track by Daniele Gas on the other side, which launched the Noise Maker label, under the direction of Italo house producer Gianfranco Bortolotti. D'Agostino would continue working with Gas, as well as Mauro Picotto's production team in the following years. As a DJ, D'Agostino is known as one of the "pioneers of Mediterranean Progressive Dance", consisting of minimalistic sounds and Latin and Mediterranean melodies. As a record producer, D'Agostino uses the pseudonym "Gigi Dag"; he transforms a piece, originally destined for the discos, into a success for the mainstream public.

After successes like the track "Sweetly", he joined the team of Bortolotti, the general manager of Media Records and suddenly reached the top of the hit parades. His single "FLY", published in 1996 with BXR Noise Maker, the label created by Media Records for Mediterranean progressive house, reached the top of the sales in Italy. This was followed by his single "Gigi's Violin".

Subsequently, D'Agostino released the song "Angel's Symphony" with R.A.F. by Mauro Picotto, a friend from Media Records. His biggest project was the self-titled debut album Gigi D'Agostino, consisting of 19 tracks, which sold over 60,000 copies.

After his rise to success, D'Agostino's musical style changed, with his sound becoming more melodic, at midway between house and progressive, with more energetic and melodious sonorities and less obsessive rhythms, also known as Italo dance.

In 1997, he released the single "Gin Lemon", followed by "Your Love (Elisir)" (1998), "Cuba Libre" (1998), and "Bla Bla Bla" (1999). He later released the album Eurodance Compilation, which contained five unpublished tracks. With this compilation, he earned a platinum disc and was awarded "Best Producer in 1999" at the Italian Dance Awards. In October, D'Agostino released another hit single, entitled "Another Way".

In 1999, his album L'Amour toujours (released in 2001 in the United States) included 23 tracks on two CDs, with the hit song "L'Amour toujours" bringing him to the 10th position in the sales parade in Italy; as a result, he earned another Platinum Disc. His 1999 single "Bla Bla Bla" became a major hit in Europe. He described the single as "a piece I wrote thinking of all the people who talk and talk without saying anything!"

=== 2000s ===
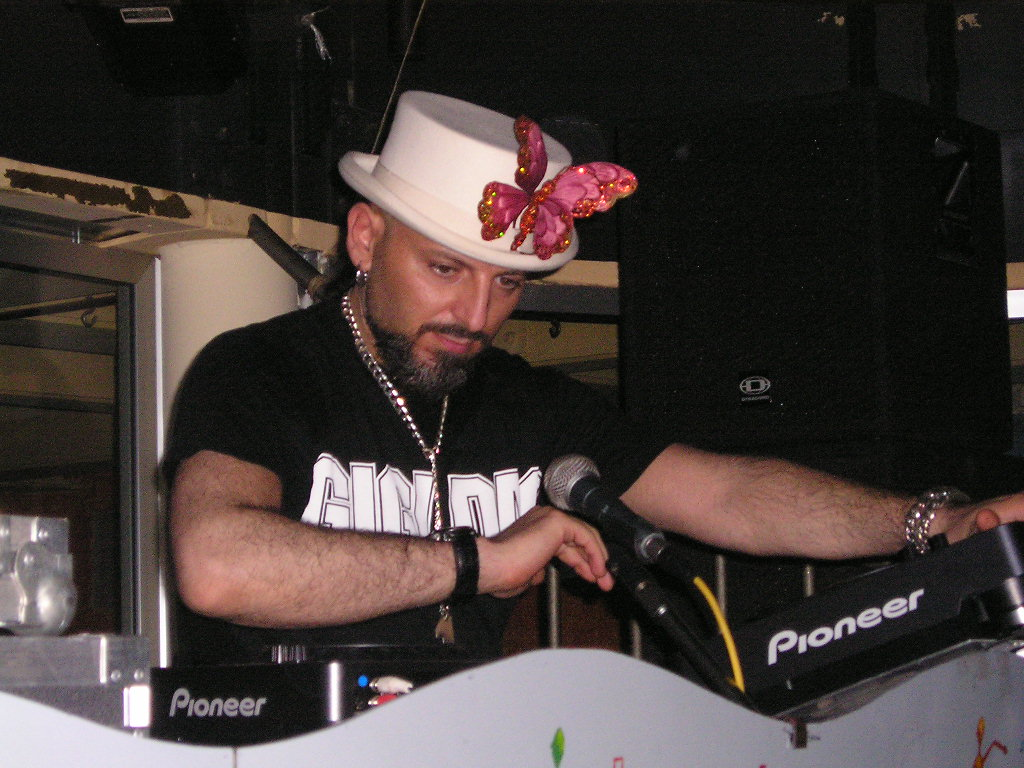
D'Agostino performing in 2007

In 2000, his remake of the Nik Kershaw song "The Riddle" sold 1,000,000 copies in Germany and 200,000 copies in France. He also released the albums Tecno Fes (August 2000) and Tecno Fes - EP, Vol. 2 (December 2000).

In 2001, he released L'Amour toujours EP, consisting of three songs: two new versions of "L'amour Toujours" and "Un giorno credi", a single made in collaboration with Edoardo Bennato. "Un giorno credi" reached the top of the parades in Italy and became one of the most played songs in the national and international music networks. He was also awarded "Best DJ-Producer of the Year" at the "Red Bull Awards" in Italy.

In 2001, he also released the hit "Super", as a result of a collaboration with Albertino (an Italian music artist), which won him the awards "Best Dance Producer" at the PIM (Italian Music Award) and "Public Award" at the Danish DJs Award in Copenhagen, Denmark. In December of that year, he released Il grande viaggio, a compilation of his favourite songs, including old electronic pieces and new rhythms and melodies. As a result, he was awarded "Best Dance Producer" at the Italian Dance Awards.

In 2003, he released the song "Ripassa" in the EP Underconstruction 1: Silence, a hit which is very important for his next productions. This song helped influence Lento Violento, a subgenre that had yet to be distinguished.

On 15 July 2004, his compilation "Euro Dance" won Platinum certification with 120,000 copies sold in just a few weeks.

In December 2004, D'Agostino released his fourth studio album, L'Amour toujours II.

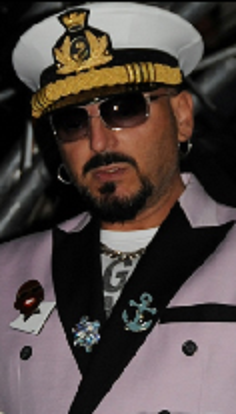
D'Agostino in 2011

D'Agostino has played in some well-known clubs throughout Europe, including in Italy, Spain, France, the Netherlands, the Czech Republic, Germany, Switzerland, and England (in 1996, he played at the Ministry of Sound in London with Mauro Picotto).

In 2006, he created his own new record label called "Noisemaker Hard" to differentiate the style of music released under his older record label, "Noisemaker".

In 2007, D'Agostino released Lento Violento ...e altre storie, a compilation which contains two CDs and his new 35 Lento Violento songs. Most important "hits" of the album are "Cammino" (a collaboration with Dimitri Mazza) and "Vorrei Fare una Canzone" (a collaboration with Gerolamo Sacco) according to YouTube views.

After some months, he released the compilation La musica che pesta under the name "Lento Violento Man", which contains two CDs for a total of 38 unmixed tracks.

From 2005 until January 2010, he had radio programmes on the Italian Radio m2o Musica allo Stato Puro (in English: "Music at the Pure State"), called "Il Cammino di Gigi D'Agostino" and "Quello che mi piace ". They consist of DJ sets played by Gigi, featuring new remixes of his songs and songs by Italian and international artists.

=== 2010s ===
In August 2011, he released the digital single "Stay With Me". This was released a few months after he postponed the release of his upcoming album Mondo Reale.

In May 2017, CBC News reported that his music is popular in the remote Canadian Inuit community of Arviat, where D'Agostino's "slicing, bass-heavy beats have a lot in common with the music of traditional Inuit drum-dancing."

In 2018, along with Dynoro, Gigi released "In My Mind", which became an international hit.

== Logo ==

Starting with his 1999 release "Bla Bla Bla", many of D'Agostino's album covers have featured a logo consisting of the Japanese Kanji 舞 meaning "dance". He has also used forms of his name written in katakana, [ジージーダグ] (Jījī Dagu) and [ジージーダゴスティーノ] (Jījī Dagosutīno), on several album covers.

== Discography ==
=== Studio albums ===
Title	Year	Peak chart positions							Certifications
Title	Year	ITA	AUT	BEL	DEN	GER	NLD	SWI	Certifications
Gigi D'Agostino	1996	—	—	—	—	—	—	—	
L'Amour toujours	1999	25	1	16	30	10	3	53	IFPI AUT: 3× Platinum; BVMI: Platinum; ITA: Platinum; NVPI: Gold
L'Amour toujours II	2004	—	6	—	—	65	—	—	
"―" denotes a release that did not chart.

=== Extended plays ===
Title	Year	Peak chart positions			
Title	Year	ITA	AUT	FRA	GER
Gin Lemon	1997	—	—	—	—
Tanzen	1999	—	—	40	—
Tecno Fes EP	2000	—	7	—	69
Tecno Fes Vol. 2	2000	14	1	40	95
L'Amour toujours EP	2001	—	—	—	—
Underconstruction 1: Silence	2003	—	—	—	—
Underconstruction 2: Silence Remix	2004	—	—	—	—
Underconstruction 3: Remix	2004	—	—	—	—
"—" denotes an extended play that did not chart or was not released.

=== Compilations ===
- A Journey into Space (1996)
- Le Voyage Estate (1996)
- The Greatest Hits (1996) (best-of album)
- Progressiva (1996)
- Progressiva Hyperspace (1997)
- Il grande viaggio di Gigi D'Agostino Vol. 1 (2001)
- Il programmino di Gigi D'agostino (2003)
- Live at Altromondo (2003)
- Benessere 1 (2004)
- At Altromondo Part II (2004)
- Laboratorio 1 (2004)
- Movimenti incoerenti Vol. 1 (2005)
- Movimenti incoerenti Vol. 2 (2005)
- Movimenti incoerenti Vol. 3 (2005)
- Laboratorio 2 (2005)
- Laboratorio 3 (2005)
- Disco Tanz (2005)
- Some Experiments (2006)
- Lento Violento ...e altre storie (2007)
- La musica che pesta (as Lento Violento Man) (2007)
- Suono libero (2008)
- The Essential Gigi D'Agostino (2009) (Austria and Germany only) (best-of album)
- Ieri & oggi mix Vol. 1 (2010)
- Ieri & oggi mix Vol. 2 (2010)
- Gigi D'Agostino Collection Vol. 1 (2019)
- Gigi D'Agostino Collection Vol. 2 (2019)

=== Singles ===
Year	Title	Peak chart positions										Certifications (sales thresholds)	Album
Year	Title	ITA	AUT	BEL	CAN	FRA	GER	NLD	SPA	UK	US	Certifications (sales thresholds)	Album
1995	"Sweetly"	—	—	—	—	—	—	19	—	—	—		Gigi D'Agostino
1995	"New Year's Day"	12	—	—	—	—	—	—	—	—	—		Gigi D'Agostino
1995	"Gigi's Violin"	4	—	—	—	—	—	—	—	—	—		Gigi D'Agostino
1995	"Angel's Symphony"	9	—	—	—	—	—	—	—	—	—		Gigi D'Agostino
1996	"Elektro Message"	22	—	—	—	—	—	—	—	—	—		Gigi D'Agostino
1997	"Music (An Echo Deep Inside)"	24	—	—	—	—	—	—	—	—	—		Gin Lemon
1997	"Gin Lemon"	—	—	—	—	—	—	—	—	—	—		Gin Lemon
1998	"Your Love Elisir"	5	—	—	—	73	—	—	—	—	—		L'Amour toujours
1998	"Cuba Libre"	15	—	—	—	—	—	—	—	—	—		L'Amour toujours
1999	"Bla Bla Bla"	6	3	56	—	15	4	43	—	87	—	FRA: Silver; GER: Gold	L'Amour toujours
1999	"Another Way"	—	13	—	—	33	16	—	—	—	—		L'Amour toujours
1999	"The Riddle"	21	14	4	8	7	4	4	—	—	—	FRA: Silver; GER: Gold	L'Amour toujours
2000	"La Passion"	—	1	1	—	18	2	12	15	—	—	AUT: Platinum; GER: Gold	L'Amour toujours
2000	"Super (1, 2, 3)" (with Albertino)	2	1	4	—	46	—	34	3	—	—		Non-album single
2001	"L'Amour toujours"	6	3	2	11	—	3	1	7	—	78	BPI: Platinum; IFPI AUT: Gold; NVPI: Platinum; GER: Gold	L'Amour toujours
2004	"Silence"	23	10	37	—	—	20	21	—	—	—		L'Amour toujours II
2004	"Underconstruction 2: Silence"	—	39	—	—	—	—	—	—	—	—		Undercontruction 2: Silence
2004	"Gigi's Goodnight" (with Pandolfi)	—	17	—	—	—	81	—	—	—	—		L'Amour toujours II
2004	"Summer of Energy"	17	26	—	—	—	77	—	—	—	—		L'Amour toujours II
2005	"Wellfare"	14	28	—	—	—	41	—	12	—	—		L'Amour toujours II
2006	"I Wonder Why"	14	20	—	—	—	81	—	—	—	—		L'Amour toujours II
2011	"Stay with Me"	—	—	—	—	—	—	—	—	—	—		Ieri & Oggi Mix Vol. 1
2012	"L'Amour toujours 2012" (featuring Robbie Miraux)	—	—	—	—	—	—	—	—	—	—		Non-album singles
2018	"In My Mind" (with Dynoro)	11	1	2	50	7	1	3	45	5	—	FIMI: Gold; BPI: 2× Platinum; BVMI: 7× Gold; IFPI AUT: 2× Platinum; IFPI SWI: 2× Platinum; SNEP: Diamond; NVPI: Platinum	Non-album singles
2020	"Hollywood" (with LA Vision)	32	2	—	—	—	10	—	—	—	—	IFPI AUT: 3× Platinum; FIMI: Gold; GER: Gold	Non-album singles
2021	"Never Be Lonely" (with Vize and Emotik)	—	—	—	—	—	—	—	—	—	—		Non-album singles
2021	"Beautiful" (with Luca Noise)	—	—	—	—	—	—	—	—	—	—		Non-album singles
2021	"One More Dance" (with Marnik and Luca Noise)	—	—	—	—	—	—	—	—	—	—		Non-album singles
"—" denotes releases that did not chart.

== DJ Magazine Top 100 DJs ==
Year	Position	Notes	Ref.
2001	98	New Entry	
Hiatus
2005	98	Re Entry	
2006	165	Exit (Down 67)	
2007	162	Exit (Up 3)	
