= List of number-one songs of the 2020s (Czech Republic) =

Rádio Top 100 Oficiální is the official chart of the top ranking songs as based on airplay in the Czech Republic, compiled and published weekly by IFPI Czech Republic.

Below is the list of songs that have reached number one on the Rádio Top 100 Oficiální during the 2020s.

== Number-one songs ==
Issue date	Song	Artist	Weeks at number one
2020
December 23, 2019	"Dance Monkey"	Tones and I	3
January 13	"Only Human"	Jonas Brothers	1
January 20	"Ride It"	Regard	2
February 3	"Hvězdáři"	Kryštof featuring Simona Martausová	1
February 10	"Ride It"	Regard	2
February 24	"Hvězdáři"	Kryštof featuring Simona Martausová	1
March 2	"Ride It"	Regard	1
March 9	"Hvězdáři"	Kryštof featuring Simona Martausová	1
March 16	"Before You Go"	Lewis Capaldi	8
May 11	"Blinding Lights"	The Weeknd	2
May 25	"Hned teď (pojď být světlometem)"	Kryštof	2
June 8	"Blinding Lights"	The Weeknd	8
August 3	"Kings & Queens"	Ava Max	7
September 21	"In Your Eyes"	The Weeknd	1
September 28	"Be Kind"	Marshmello & Halsey	1
October 5	"Breaking Me"	Topic and A7S	3
October 26	"Head & Heart"	Joel Corry and MNEK	1
November 2	"In Your Eyes"	The Weeknd	1
November 9	"Breaking Me"	Topic and A7S	1
November 16	"Head & Heart"	Joel Corry and MNEK	1
November 23	"I přes to všechno"	Mirai	4
December 21	"Vánoční"	Kryštof and Karel Gott	1
December 28	"I přes to všechno"	Mirai	11
2021
March 15	"All We Got"	Robin Schulz featuring Kiddo	1
March 22	"I přes to všechno"	Mirai	2
April 5	"I Need You to Hate Me"	JC Stewart	5
May 10	"Your Love (9PM)"	ATB, Topic and A7S	1
May 17	"Follow You"	Imagine Dragons	1
May 24	"I Need You to Hate Me"	JC Stewart	1
May 31	"Your Love (9PM)"	ATB, Topic and A7S	2
June 14	"Follow You"	Imagine Dragons	3
July 5	"Higher Power"	Coldplay	2
July 19	"Angels like You"	Miley Cyrus	1
July 26	"Higher Power"	Coldplay	1
August 2	"Angels like You"	Miley Cyrus	1
August 9	"Higher Power"	Coldplay	1
August 16	"Bad Habits"	Ed Sheeran	11
November 1	"Love Again"	Dua Lipa	2
November 15	"Rampampam"	Minelli	1
November 22	"Love Again"	Dua Lipa	2
December 6	"Easy on Me"	Adele	9
2022
February 7	"Bad Habits"	Ed Sheeran	4
March 7	"Cold Heart"	Elton John and Dua Lipa	1
March 14	"Most People"	R3hab and Lukas Graham	1
March 21	"Cold Heart"	Elton John and Dua Lipa	1
March 28	"Overpass Graffiti"	Ed Sheeran	1
April 4	"Thunder"	Gabry Ponte, Lum!x and Prezioso	1
April 11	"Nejsi sám"	Miro Žbirka featuring David Žbirka	1
April 18	"The Motto"	Tiësto and Ava Max	1
April 25	"Thunder"	Gabry Ponte, Lum!x and Prezioso	2
May 9	"Cold Heart"	Elton John and Dua Lipa	1
May 16	"Thunder"	Gabry Ponte, Lum!x and Prezioso	1
May 23	"Vedle tebe usínám"	Mirai	3
June 13	"As It Was"	Harry Styles	6
July 25	"Vedle tebe usínám"	Mirai	1
August 1	"Run"	Becky Hill and Galantis	1
August 8	"When You're Gone"	Shawn Mendes	1
August 15	"Vedle tebe usínám"	Mirai	1
August 22	"Originál"	Marek Ztracený	3
September 12	"Vedle tebe usínám"	Mirai	4
October 10	"2Step"	Ed Sheeran	2
October 24	"Irrelevant"	Pink	1
October 31	"Bad Memories"	Meduza and James Carter featuring Elley Duhé and Fast Boy	1
November 7	"Měl bych si boty zout"	Chinaski	2
November 21	"Forget Me"	Lewis Capaldi	1
November 28	"Měl bych si boty zout"	Chinaski	1
December 5	"Forget Me"	Lewis Capaldi	1
December 12	"Vánoce na míru"	Ewa Farna	2
December 26	"Numb"	Marshmello and Khalid	2
2023
January 9	"Forget Me"	Lewis Capaldi	5
February 13	"Flowers"	Miley Cyrus	25
August 7	"Waterfall"	Michael Schulte and R3HAB	1
August 14	"Chemical"	Post Malone	1
August 21	"Crying on the Dancefloor"	Endless Summer and Violet Days	1
August 28	"Waterfall"	Michael Schulte and R3HAB	1
September 4	"React"	Switch Disco and Ella Henderson	2
September 18	"Waterfall"	Michael Schulte and R3HAB	1
September 25	"Dance the Night"	Dua Lipa	3
October 16	"Waterfall"	Michael Schulte and R3HAB	5
November 20	"Runaway"	Pink	1
November 27	"The Feeling"	Lost Frequencies	3
December 18	"Runaway"	Pink	5
2024
January 22	"Houdini"	Dua Lipa	5
February 26	"Overdrive"	Ofenbach featuring Norma Jean Martine	1
March 4	"Houdini"	Dua Lipa	5
April 8	"Overdrive"	Ofenbach featuring Norma Jean Martine	2
April 22	"Houdini"	Dua Lipa	2
May 6	"Waterfall"	Michael Schulte and R3HAB	1
May 13	"Lose Control"	Teddy Swims	2
May 27	"Alibi"	Ella Henderson featuring Rudimental	2
June 10	"Blindside"	James Arthur	1
June 17	"Houdini"	Dua Lipa	1
June 24	"Alibi"	Ella Henderson featuring Rudimental	2
July 8	"I tak to za to stojí"	O5 A RadeČek and Elly	2
July 22	"Beautiful Things"	Benson Boone	1
July 29	"I Like the Way You Kiss Me"	Artemas	1
August 5	"Stumblin' In"	Cyril	1
August 12	"I Like the Way You Kiss Me"	Artemas	1
August 19	"Out of Love"	Oliver Heldens and Weibird	3
September 9	"Stumblin' In"	Cyril	1
September 16	"I Like the Way You Kiss Me"	Artemas	1
September 23	"Feelslikeimfallinginlove"	Coldplay	4
October 21	"Stargazing"	Myles Smith	5
November 25	"The Emptiness Machine"	Linkin Park	6
2025
January 6	"Die with a Smile"	Lady Gaga and Bruno Mars	2
January 20	"Too Sweet"	Hozier	4
February 17	"Wave"	Fast Boy and Raf	1
February 24	"Forever Young"	David Guetta, Alphaville and Ava Max	1
March 3	"Nice to Meet You"	Myles Smith	2
March 17	"Born with a Broken Heart"	Damiano David	1
March 24	"APT."	Rosé and Bruno Mars	3
April 14	"Born with a Broken Heart"	Damiano David	5
May 19	"That's So True"	Gracie Abrams	1
May 26	"Abracadabra"	Lady Gaga	5
June 30	"End of the World"	Miley Cyrus	1
July 7	"Ordinary"	Alex Warren	1
July 14	"End of the World"	Miley Cyrus	2
July 28	"Ordinary"	Alex Warren	1
August 4	"It's Not Right but It's Okay"	Felix Jaehn and Whitney Houston	1
August 11	"End of the World"	Miley Cyrus	3
September 1	"Dokola"	Mirai & Tribbs	3
September 22	"Undressed"	Sombr	2
October 6	"Be Mine"	Kamrad	1
October 13	"Pubert'ák"	Xindl X	3
3 November	"Be Mine"	Kamrad	1
10 November	"Pubert'ák"	Xindl X	2
24 November	"Lo Que Pasó, Pasó"	Álvaro Soler and Marta Santos	3
15 December	"Gone Gone Gone"	David Guetta, Teddy Swims and Tones and I	3
2026
January 5	"The Fate of Ophelia"	Taylor Swift	4
February 2	"Gone Gone Gone"	David Guetta, Teddy Swims and Tones and I	5
March 9	"In My Head"	R3hab	1
March 16	"The Fate of Ophelia"	Taylor Swift	14
June 22	"Vzpomeneš si?"	Ewa Farna and Mirai	4
July 20	"Don't Wanna Go Home"	Meduza and Henry Camamile	1
July 27	"Vzpomeneš si?"	Ewa Farna and Mirai	2
August 10	"Neříkej, co má se stát"	Ewa Farna	1
August 17	"The Fate of Ophelia"	Taylor Swift	1
August 24	"Neříkej, co má se stát"	Ewa Farna	6
October 5	"Sad Girls"	Bebe Rexha and David Guetta	1
October 12	"Neříkej, co má se stát"	Ewa Farna	1
October 19	"Sad Girls"	Bebe Rexha and David Guetta	1
October 26	"Bass Persuades"	Miley Cyrus	2
November 9	"Neříkej, co má se stát"	Ewa Farna	1
November 16	"Bass Persuades"	Miley Cyrus	1

== See also ==
- 2020s in music
