= Austria in the Eurovision Song Contest 2022 =

- Eurovision Song Contest 2022
- Participating broadcaster: Österreichischer Rundfunk (ORF)
- Country: Austria
- Selection process: Internal selection
- Announcement date: Artist: 8 February 2022; Song: 11 March 2022

Competing entry
- Song: "Halo"
- Artist: Lumix feat. Pia Maria
- Songwriters: Anders Nilsen; Gabriele Ponte; Luca Michlmayr; Rasmus Flyckt; Sophie Alexandra Tweed-Simmons

Placement
- Semi-final result: Failed to qualify (15th)

Participation chronology

Austria was represented at the Eurovision Song Contest 2022 with the song "Halo", written by Anders Nilsen, Gabriele Ponte, Luca Michlmayr, Rasmus Flyckt, and Sophie Alexandra Tweed-Simmons, and performed by Michlmayr himself under his stage name Lumix, featuring Pia Maria. The Austrian participating broadcaster, Österreichischer Rundfunk (ORF), announced on 8 February 2022 that it had internally selected Lumix and Pia Maria to compete at the contest, while "Halo" was presented to the public on 11 March 2022.

Austria was drawn to compete in the first semi-final of the Eurovision Song Contest which took place on 10 May 2022. Performing during the show in position 13, "Halo" was not announced among the top 10 entries of the first semi-final and therefore did not qualify to compete in the final. It was later revealed that Austria placed 15th out of the 17 participating countries in the semi-final with 42 points.

== Background ==
Prior to the 2022 contest, Österreichischer Rundfunk (ORF) had participated in the Eurovision Song Contest representing Austria fifty-three times since its first entry in 1957. It has won the contest on two occasions: in 1966 with the song "Merci, Chérie" performed by Udo Jürgens and in 2014 with the song "Rise Like a Phoenix" performed by Conchita Wurst. Following the introduction of semi-finals for the 2004 contest, it has featured in only seven finals. Austria's least successful result has been last place, achieved on eight occasions, most recently in 2012. It has also received nul points on four occasions; in 1962, 1988, 1991, and 2015.

As part of its duties as participating broadcaster, ORF organises the selection of its entry in the Eurovision Song Contest and broadcasts the event in the country. The broadcaster confirmed its intentions to participate at the 2022 contest on 20 October 2021. From 2011 to 2013 as well as in 2015 and 2016, ORF set up national finals with several artists to choose both the song and performer to compete at Eurovision for Austria, with both the public and a panel of jury members involved in the selection. In 2014 and since 2017, ORF has held an internal selection to choose its artist and song.

== Before Eurovision ==
=== Internal selection ===
Artists were nominated by the ORF Eurovision Song Contest Team, which collaborated with music expert Eberhard Forcher who worked on the selection of the Austrian entries since 2016, to submit songs to the broadcaster. On 9 November 2021, Forcher revealed that four entries had been shortlisted with a final decision to be made in late January 2022, however, this was later delayed to late January 2022. The four shortlisted artists (marked in bold the table below) were revealed by ESC Kompakt on 13 January 2022.

On 8 February 2022, "Halo" performed by Lumix featuring Pia Maria was announced by ORF as the Austrian entry for the Eurovision Song Contest 2022 during the radio show Ö3-Wecker, aired on Ö3. "Halo" was written by Lumix himself together with Anders Nilsen, Gabriele Ponte, Rasmus Flyckt and Sophie Alexandra Tweed-Simmons, and was selected from two entries reported to have ultimately been considered: "Das Meer" performed by Anger and "Halo" performed by Lumix and Maria. The presentation of the song took place on 11 March 2022 during Ö3-Wecker.

Competing artists
- **Anger**
- Benny König
- **Candlelight Ficus**
- Christl
- **DelaDap**
- Der traurige Gärtner
- Diego Federico
- Fred Owusu
- Freude
- Gary Lux
- **Lumix**
- Matthias Nebel
- Max the Sax
- Miblu
- Popmaché
- Poxrucker Sisters
- Rian
- Rydell
- Selina Maria (Sålina)
- Serenity
- Sladek
- Slomo
- Teodora Špirić
- Visions of Atlantis

=== Promotion ===
During the promotional pre-parties for Eurovision, Pia Maria received criticism for vocal issues in the live performances of "Halo". It was later confirmed that her vocal struggles were due to long COVID, as well as the vocalist's inexperience with in-ear monitors. The Austrian delegation hired a vocal coach to work with Pia Maria to prepare for the contest, and the backing track for "Halo" was transposed into a lower key for future pre-parties.

== At Eurovision ==
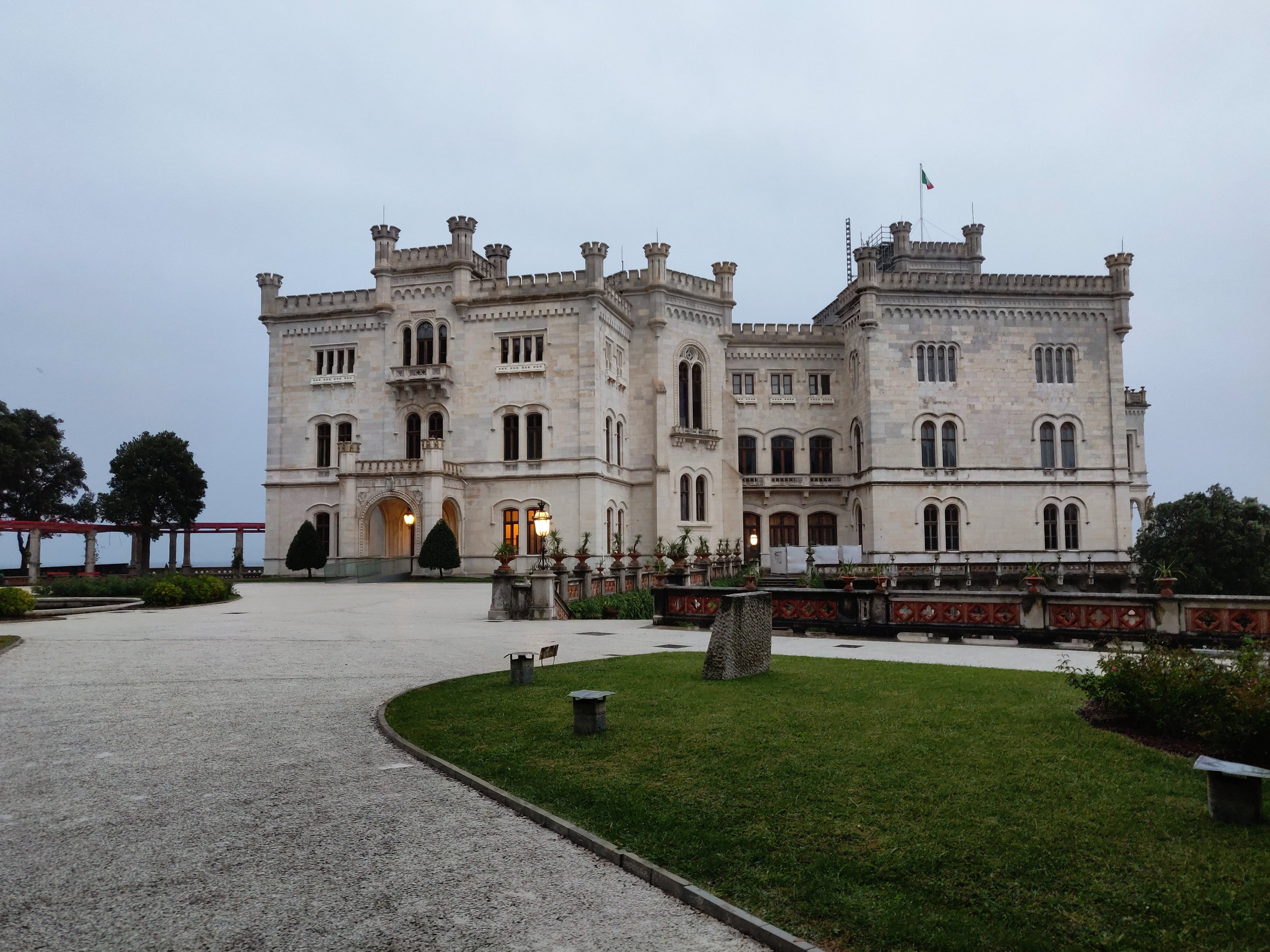
A video postcard introduced Lumix and Pia Maria's performance in the first semi-final of the Eurovision Song Contest 2022. The postcard was filmed at the Miramare Castle in Trieste and featured virtual projections of the duo across the location.

According to Eurovision rules, all nations with the exceptions of the host country and the "Big Five" (France, Germany, Italy, Spain and the United Kingdom) are required to qualify from one of two semi-finals in order to compete for the final; the top ten countries from each semi-final progress to the final. The European Broadcasting Union (EBU) split up the competing countries into six different pots based on voting patterns from previous contests, with countries with favourable voting histories put into the same pot. On 25 January 2022, an allocation draw was held which placed each country into one of the two semi-finals, as well as which half of the show they would perform in. Austria was placed into the first semi-final, which was held on 10 May 2022, and was scheduled to perform in the second half of the show.

Once all the competing songs for the 2022 contest had been released, the running order for the semi-finals was decided by the shows' producers rather than through another draw, so that similar songs were not placed next to each other. Austria was set to perform in position 13, following the entry from Denmark and before the entry from Iceland.

In Austria, all shows were broadcast on ORF 1, with commentary by Andi Knoll and on FM4, with commentary by Kurdwin Ayub, Florian Alexander, Hannes Duscher and Roland Gratzer. The Austrian spokesperson, who announced the top 12-point score awarded by the Austrian jury during the final, was Philipp Hansa, who previously also announced the points for Austria in 2021 and 2019.

=== Semi-final ===
Lumix and Pia Maria took part in technical rehearsals on 1 and 5 May, followed by dress rehearsals on 9 and 10 May. This included the jury show on 9 May where the professional juries of each country watched and voted on the competing entries.

The Austrian performance featured the duo on stage with a giant circular keyboard along with a DJ set. The predominant colour in the Austrian performance was red with jets of pyrotechnics towards the end of the performance. For the contest, Pia Maria performed the song one key lower in order to attain easier vocal results.

At the end of the show, Austria was not announced among the top 10 entries in the first semi-final and therefore failed to qualify to compete in the final. This was Austria's third consecutive non-qualification to the grand final having last appeared in 2018. It was later revealed that Austria placed fifteenth in the semi-final, receiving a total of 42 points: 36 points from the televoting and 6 points from the juries.

=== Voting ===
Below is a breakdown of points awarded to Austria during the first semi-final. Voting during the three shows involved each country awarding two sets of points from 1-8, 10 and 12: one from their professional jury and the other from televoting. The exact composition of the professional jury, and the results of each country's jury and televoting were released after the final; the individual results from each jury member were also released in an anonymised form. The Austrian jury consisted of Die Mayerin, Simone, Tina Naderer, Wolfgang Lindner, and Thorsteinn Einarsson. In the first semi-final, Austria finished in fifteenth place out of seventeen entries, marking the country's third consecutive non-qualification from the semi-finals. Over the course of the contest, Austria awarded its 12 points to Armenia (jury) and Ukraine (televote) in the first semi-final and to the United Kingdom (jury) and Ukraine (televote) in the final.

==== Points awarded to Austria ====
Points awarded to Austria (Semi-final 1)
Score	Televote	Jury
12 points		
10 points		
8 points		
7 points		
6 points		
5 points	Armenia	
4 points	Albania; Croatia; Iceland; Switzerland	
3 points	Norway; Ukraine	Italy
2 points	Denmark; Greece; Italy; Moldova	Greece
1 point	Latvia	France

==== Points awarded by Austria ====
Points awarded by Austria (Semi-final 1)
Score	Televote	Jury
12 points	Ukraine	Armenia
10 points	Moldova	Portugal
8 points	Armenia	Netherlands
7 points	Norway	Switzerland
6 points	Croatia	Greece
5 points	Netherlands	Denmark
4 points	Lithuania	Norway
3 points	Switzerland	Croatia
2 points	Albania	Iceland
1 point	Portugal	Latvia

Points awarded by Austria (Final)
Score	Televote	Jury
12 points	Ukraine	United Kingdom
10 points	Serbia	Portugal
8 points	United Kingdom	Netherlands
7 points	Moldova	Sweden
6 points	Sweden	Armenia
5 points	Norway	Norway
4 points	Poland	Greece
3 points	Italy	Italy
2 points	Germany	Spain
1 point	Spain	Switzerland

==== Detailed voting results ====
The following members comprised the Austrian jury:

- Die Mayerin – Singer-songwriter, psychologist
- Simone – Musician, songwriter, represented Austria in the Eurovision Song Contest 1990
- Tina Naderer – Singer, producer
- Wolfgang Lindner – Drummer, composer, songwriter
- Thorsteinn Einarsson – Musician, singer-songwriter

Detailed voting results from Austria (Semi-final 1)
R/O	Country	Jury							Televote	
R/O	Country	Juror A	Juror B	Juror C	Juror D	Juror E	Rank	Points	Rank	Points
01	Albania	16	16	16	16	15	16		9	2
02	Latvia	14	14	7	3	13	10	1	16	
03	Lithuania	6	15	13	11	9	12		7	4
04	Switzerland	9	8	4	2	4	4	7	8	3
05	Slovenia	13	13	14	15	12	15		12	
06	Ukraine	7	5	11	14	11	11		1	12
07	Bulgaria	11	12	10	13	14	13		15	
08	Netherlands	8	1	3	7	2	3	8	6	5
09	Moldova	12	11	15	12	16	14		2	10
10	Portugal	2	9	5	1	1	2	10	10	1
11	Croatia	4	6	6	10	7	8	3	5	6
12	Denmark	5	7	2	6	10	6	5	14	
13	Austria									
14	Iceland	10	10	12	4	8	9	2	11	
15	Greece	3	3	8	9	6	5	6	13	
16	Norway	15	2	9	5	5	7	4	4	7
17	Armenia	1	4	1	8	3	1	12	3	8

Detailed voting results from Austria (Final)
R/O	Country	Jury							Televote	
R/O	Country	Juror 1	Juror 2	Juror 3	Juror 4	Juror 5	Rank	Points	Rank	Points
01	Czech Republic	15	10	11	17	21	15		21	
02	Romania	23	18	24	24	22	25		11	
03	Portugal	2	9	1	4	1	2	10	19	
04	Finland	16	19	23	21	20	22		13	
05	Switzerland	9	15	9	7	11	10	1	16	
06	France	17	24	22	25	24	24		14	
07	Norway	8	4	12	6	5	6	5	6	5
08	Armenia	3	7	3	8	8	5	6	15	
09	Italy	18	12	4	3	9	8	3	8	3
10	Spain	10	5	8	10	13	9	2	10	1
11	Netherlands	5	3	5	5	2	3	8	12	
12	Ukraine	7	14	21	22	17	14		1	12
13	Germany	22	17	16	12	4	11		9	2
14	Lithuania	11	20	20	14	15	17		18	
15	Azerbaijan	21	25	10	23	10	16		25	
16	Belgium	25	23	14	13	16	20		23	
17	Greece	6	6	7	9	6	7	4	22	
18	Iceland	14	16	13	11	7	12		24	
19	Moldova	13	22	19	20	23	21		4	7
20	Sweden	4	2	6	1	14	4	7	5	6
21	Australia	19	13	17	15	19	18		20	
22	United Kingdom	1	1	2	2	3	1	12	3	8
23	Poland	24	11	18	18	18	19		7	4
24	Serbia	20	21	25	19	25	23		2	10
25	Estonia	12	8	15	16	12	13		17	
