= Woodcock (surname) =

Woodcock is an English-language surname. It is derived from the bird of the same name (Middle English: wodecok; Old English: wuducocc). It may have been an occupational surname given to people who bought or sold woodcocks, or as a nickname for a person who was gullible like the bird, which was easy to catch. It may also be a variant of the toponymic surname Woodcott (from the Old English: wudu 'wood' + cot 'cottage', 'shelter'; referring to places such as Woodcote, Oxfordshire, England) created by confusion between the Middle English -cock and -cot. Notable people with the surname include:

- Ashley Woodcock (born 1947), Australian cricketer
- Bill Woodcock (born 1971), American computer scientist
- Bruce Woodcock (boxer) (1921–1997), English boxer
- Bruce Woodcock (computer games analyst) (born 1970), American computer games analyst
- Carla Woodcock (born 1998), English actress
- Chandler Woodcock (fl. 2000s), American politician from Maine
- Charles Woodcock (1850–1923), lover of King Karl of Württemberg
- George Woodcock (1912–1995), Canadian writer and historian
- George Woodcock (cricketer) (1894–1968), batsman
- George Woodcock (trade unionist) (1904–1979), English trade unionist
- Janet Woodcock (born 1948), American physician, acting Commissioner of the FDA
- Jim Woodcock, British computer scientist
- John A. Woodcock Jr. (born 1950), United States federal judge
- John Woodcock (American football) (1954–1998), American football player
- John Woodcock (cricket writer) (1926–2021), British cricket writer and journalist
- John Woodcock (magistrate) (born 1967), Italian prosecutor
- John Woodcock (martyr) (1603–1646), English Franciscan martyr
- John Woodcock (politician) (born 1978), British politician, also known as Lord Walney
- Jonathan Woodcock (born 1962), Royal Navy officer
- Kim Joanne Woodcock Lukas (born 1977), British-Italian pop singer known as Kim Lukas
- Joseph C. Woodcock (1925–1997), American politician from New Jersey
- Leonard F. Woodcock (1911–2001), trade union leader, American diplomat
- Leslie V. Woodcock (born 1945), chemistry professor at the University of Manchester
- Luke Woodcock (born 1982), New Zealand cricketer
- Patrick Woodcock (born 1968), Canadian writer and poet
- Peter Woodcock (1939–2010), Canadian serial killer, rapist, and necrophile
- Richard Woodcock (1928–2024), developed Woodcock–Johnson tests of cognitive abilities
- Steven Woodcock (born 1964), British actor
- Thomas Woodcock (officer of arms) (born 1951), British Officer of Arms
- Thomas Woodcock (VC) (1888–1918), a British recipient of the Victoria Cross
- Tommy Woodcock (1905–1985), Australian strapper of champion horse Phar Lap
- Tony Woodcock (footballer) (born 1955), English (soccer) football player
- Tony Woodcock (rugby player) (born 1981), New Zealand rugby player
- William John Woodcock (c. 1808–1868), Anglican priest in South Australia
- Victor Hulme Woodcock (computer builder born 1966 Tyldesley)
