= All I Really Want =

All I Really Want may refer to:

- "All I Really Want", a 1982 song by Cheap Trick, originally the B-side of the single "She's Tight", also titled "All I Really Want to Do"
- "All I Really Want" (Alanis Morissette song), 1995
- "All I Really Want" (Kim Lukas song), 1999
- "All I Really Want", a song from the 2000 album TP-2.com by R. Kelly
- "All I Really Want", a song from the 2002 album Amazed by Lincoln Brewster
- "All I Really Want", a song from the 2005 All I Really Want for Christmas, by Steven Curtis Chapman
- "All I Really Want", a single from the 2009 album Deeper Than Rap by Rick Ross
- "All I Really Want", a song from the 2009 album Where's Our Revolution by Matt Brouwer
- "All I Really Want", a song from the 2012 album The Rescue (Adam Cappa album)

== See also ==
- "All I Really Want To Do", song by Bob Dylan, best known as cover version hits for The Byrds and Cher
