= Halo (Lumix song) =

2022 song by Lumix

Single by Lumix featuring Pia Maria
- Language: English
- Released: 11 March 2022
- Genre: Dance-pop
- Label: Spinnin'
- Songwriters: Anders Nilsen; Gabriele Ponte; Luca Michlmayr; Rasmus Flyckt; Sophie Alexandra Tweed-Simmons

Music video
- "Halo" on YouTube

Eurovision Song Contest 2022 entry
- Country: Austria
- Artist: Lumix featuring Pia Maria
- Language: English
- Composers: Anders Nilsen; Gabriele Ponte; Luca Michlmayr; Rasmus Flyckt; Sophie Alexandra Tweed-Simmons
- Lyricists: Anders Nilsen; Gabriele Ponte; Luca Michlmayr; Rasmus Flyckt; Sophie Alexandra Tweed-Simmons

Finals performance
- Semi-final result: 15th
- Semi-final points: 42

Entry chronology
- ◄ "Amen" (2021)
- "Who the Hell Is Edgar?" (2023) ►

"Halo" is a song by Austrian DJ Lumix and singer Pia Maria. The song represented Austria in the Eurovision Song Contest 2022 in Turin, Italy after being selected by ORF, Austria's broadcaster for the Eurovision Song Contest. The song peaked at number six in Austria.

== Release ==
The song was officially released on 11 March 2022. However, on 3 March 2022, a snippet and the artwork cover of the song were leaked on Beatport.

== Eurovision Song Contest ==
=== Selection ===
On 9 November 2021, Eberhard Forcher, in charge of the selection for ORF, announced that four out of the over twenty artists who had been taken into consideration had been shortlisted, with the final decision expected to take place in December 2021.

Forcher later announced that these four had been narrowed down to three, and the decision provisionally moved to the end of January 2022. It was then reported that the field had been further narrowed down to only two artists, namely DJ Lumix and electronic duo Anger, and that the chosen artist would be announced the first week of February. Prior to the announcement of the selected entrant, Forcher revealed the names of all the submitting artists. These were: Anger, Benny König, Candlelight Ficus, Christl, DelaDap, Der traurige Gärtner, Diego Federico, Fred Owusu, Freude, Gary Lux, Lumix, Matthias Nebel, Max the Sax, Miblu, Popmaché, Poxrucker Sisters, Rian, Rydell, Selina Maria (Sålina), Serenity, Sladek, Slomo, Teodora Spirić, and Visions of Atlantis.

On 8 February 2022, Lumix was announced as the Austrian representative, along with Pia Maria.

=== At Eurovision ===
According to Eurovision rules, all nations with the exceptions of the host country and the "Big Five" (France, Germany, Italy, Spain and the United Kingdom) are required to qualify from one of two semi-finals in order to compete for the final; the top ten countries from each semi-final progress to the final. The European Broadcasting Union (EBU) split up the competing countries into six different pots based on voting patterns from previous contests, with countries with favourable voting histories put into the same pot. On 25 January 2022, an allocation draw was held which placed each country into one of the two semi-finals, as well as which half of the show they would perform in. Austria was placed into the first semi-final, held on 10 May 2022, and performed in the second half of the show.

== Charts ==
=== Weekly charts ===
Weekly chart performance for "Halo"
| Chart (2022) | Peak position |
|---|---|
| Austria (Ö3 Austria Top 40) | 6 |
| Iceland (Tónlistinn) | 19 |
| Lithuania (AGATA) | 31 |
| Poland (Polish Airplay Top 100) | 35 |

=== Year-end charts ===
2022 year-end chart performance for "Halo"
| Chart (2022) | Position |
|---|---|
| Austria (Ö3 Austria Top 40) | 60 |

== Certifications ==
Certifications for "Halo"
| Region | Certification | Certified units/sales |
|---|---|---|
| Austria (IFPI Austria) | Platinum | 30,000^{‡} |
^{‡} Sales+streaming figures based on certification alone.

== Awards and nominations ==
Awards and nominations for "Halo"
| Year | Organization | Award | Result | Ref. |
|---|---|---|---|---|
| 2023 | Amadeus Austrian Music Awards | Song of the Year | Won | |
| 2023 | Amadeus Austrian Music Awards | Electronic / Dance | Won | |
