= Anders Nilsen (musician) =

Norwegian comedian and musician

Anders Nilsen (born 23 June 1988) is a Norwegian songwriter and music producer from Stavanger, who has written and produced for R3HAB, Timmy Trumpet, Matoma, IVE and W&W, and currently has eight #1 singles in his home country Norway. He has also released music under the stage name DJ MøMø.

In 2013 he got a large following on the "Vine" app where he made 6 second songs, which later resulted in him being cast for a SNL like TV-show called "Torsdag Kveld Fra Nydalen". It was however with his hit "Salsa Tequila", an attempt to write a song in Spanish without actually knowing Spanish (No hablo Español, as he says in the single's lyrics) that he gained fame and an international dance hit that has charted in Norway, Netherlands and Belgium. Since January 2014, he worked on various TV shows as a writer-performer like Tabu med Abu, Torsdag Kveld Fra Nydalen and Senkveld Med Thomas & Harald. From May 2017 he started focusing full time on writing and producing for other artists.

In 2022, he represented Austria as a songwriter and producer in the Eurovision Song Contest 2022, alongside Gabry Ponte, with the song "Halo", which was performed by Lumix and Pia Maria. He also produced and co-wrote the lead single on IVE's single album After Like. The album recorded the highest sales of its own. According to Hanteo Chart, the largest album sales site in Korea, reported that "After Like" sold 466,690 copies on the first day of its release. This broke the group's previous sales for Love Dive on Hanteo Chart. After one week the single managed to sell over 924,000 physical copies through Hanteo. The single also debuted at the top of Circle Chart with over 1 million copies. After Like peaked at #20 on Global 200 (Billboard), #3 at US World Digital Song Sales (Billboard) and #1 at Top 50 Spotify and the official charts in South Korea.

== Selected discography ==
=== Producer-co-writer ===
2022:

- IVE - "After Like"
- Lumix feat. Pia Maria - "Halo"
- Now United - Holiday
- Class:y - "Tick Tick Boom"
- Tungevaag - "Not The One"

2021

- R3HAB, Timmy Trumpet, W&W - "Distant Memory"
- Breathe Carolina - "23"

2020

- Matoma - "Embrace Your Life"
- Brandon Beal - "Highs & Lows"
- Maria Mena - "Lies (they never leave their wives)"

2018:

- Morgan Sulele featuring Black O - "Noora"
- ZadeKing - "Kumbaya"
- Ezzari - "Ikke ring meg, jeg ringer deg"
- Ezzari - "Casablanca"
- Ezzari and Kald Flamme - "Isbjørn"
- Kald Flamme and Ezzari - "Jaja (oui oui si si eywa)"
- Alexandra Joner - "Chico"
- Serlina - "Digger deg"
- eMMa - "Fått deg på hjernen"
- Mads Hansen - "Sommerkroppen" (Peaked at #1 on VG-lista for 8 consecutive weeks)
- Elly Ekko - "Ring meg etter midnatt"

2017:

- Ezzari - "Dør for deg"
- Staysman & Lazz - "Om 100 år er allting glemt"
- Katastrofe - "Olav Thon"
- Pete Mello - "Kom med Mig"
- Pete Mello - "Side om Side"
- Zadeking and SnowBoyz - "Ingen er bedre enn meg"
- Sandra Lyng and Vidar Villa - "Når julen kommer"

=== Singles ===
| Year | Song | Artist | Peak position | | | | | | | Certification |
| Year | Song | Artist | NOR | BEL (Vl) | FIN | GER | NED Dutch Top 40 | NED Single Top 100 | SWE | Certification |
|---|---|---|---|---|---|---|---|---|---|---|
| 2013 | "20.000" | | – | – | – | – | – | – | – | |
| 2013 | "Abuanders" | | – | – | – | – | – | – | – | |
| 2014 | "Salsa Tequila" | | 1 | 29 | 18 | 72 | 1 | 2 | 52 | |
| 2014 | "EDM (Educational Dance Music)" | | – | – | – | – | – | – | – | |
