= Tell Me Why (Prezioso & Marvin song) =

1999 single by Prezioso & Marvin

Single by Prezioso & Marvin

from the album Back to Life
- Released: 20 April 1999
- Recorded: 1999
- Genre: Italo dance
- Length: 3:17
- Label: BMG Ariola
- Producers: Giorgio Prezioso; Andrea Prezioso; Alessandro Moschini

Prezioso & Marvin singles chronology
"Tell Me Why" (1999)	"Let Me Stay" (2000)

"Tell Me Why" is the debut single by Italian dance group Prezioso & Marvin. Released in April 1999, it became an international hit, reaching the top ten in Italy and other countries in Europe and America. It is one of the songs which popularized the Italo dance genre.

The song was written by Diego Leoni, Paolo Sandrini, Giorgio Prezioso, Andrea Prezioso and Alessandro Moschini, and produced by the members of the group. It samples Mike Oldfield's 1982 song "Family Man".

With this song, Prezioso & Marvin participated in the 1999 edition of Italian summer music festival Festivalbar. It was included in their 2000 debut album Back to Life.

"Tell Me Why" was certified gold in Austria.

== Track listing ==
1. "Tell Me Why" (Radio Mix) - 3:17
2. "Tell Me Why" (Radio Edit Mix) - 4:31
3. "Tell Me Why" (Extended Mix) - 5:10

== Charts ==
Weekly chart performance for "Tell Me Why"
Chart (1999–2000)	Peak position
Austria	2
El Salvador	7
France	53
Germany	10
Hungary	16
Italy	4
Switzerland	9

Annual chart rankings for "Tell Me Why"
Chart (2000)	Rank
European Airplay (Border Breakers)	64
