= Mystery (of Love) =

Single by Mephisto
- B-side: "Remix"
- Released: 1997
- Studio: Sisma Sound Studio
- Genre: Eurodance; house; Italodance
- Length: 4:05
- Label: Airplay Records; Jive; ZYX Music
- Songwriter: Maurizio D'Ambrosio
- Producer: Mephisto

Mephisto singles chronology
"Voices" (1996)	"Mystery (of Love)" (1997)	"Waitin' For Love" (1998)

Music video
- "Mystery (of Love)" on YouTube

"Mystery (of Love)" is a song by Italian DJ and producer Maurizio D'Ambrosio, released in 1997 under the moniker Mephisto. It features vocals by Italian singer Simona Lazzarini and was a European club hit. A moderate hit on the charts, it peaked at number 18 in Denmark, number 21 in France and number 29 in Sweden. On the Eurochart Hot 100, "Mystery (of Love)" reached number 68 in July 1997.

== Track listing ==
12" single, Italy (1997)
No.	Title	Length
1.	"Mystery (of Love)" (Hard Mix)	6:15
2.	"Mystery (of Love)" (Italian Mix)	7:00
3.	"Mystery (of Love)" (Mystery Instrumental Mix)	6:20
4.	"Mystery (of Love)" (Mystery Mix)	6:32
5.	"Mystery (of Love)" (Club Mix)	6:50

CD single, France (1997)
No.	Title	Length
1.	"Mystery (of Love)" (Radio Mix)	4:05
2.	"Mystery (of Love)" (Italian Progressive Mix)	7:05

CD maxi, Europe (1997)
No.	Title	Length
1.	"Mystery (of Love)" (Radio Edit)	4:05
2.	"Mystery (of Love)" (Mystery Mix)	6:28
3.	"Mystery (of Love)" (Club Mix)	6:50
4.	"Mystery (of Love)" (Mystery Instrumental Mix)	6:30
5.	"Mystery (of Love)" (Italian Mix)	7:02
6.	"Mystery (of Love)" (Hard Mix)	6:20

CD maxi, France (1997)
No.	Title	Length
1.	"Mystery (of Love)" (Radio Mix)	4:05
2.	"Mystery (of Love)" (Club Mix)	6:58
3.	"Mystery (of Love)" (Italian Progressive Mix)	7:05

== Charts ==
Chart (1997)	Peak position
Denmark (IFPI)	18
Europe (Eurochart Hot 100)	68
France (SNEP)	21
France Airplay (SNEP)	30
Sweden (Sverigetopplistan)	29
