= Gabry Ponte =

Italian musician, DJ and producer (born 1973)

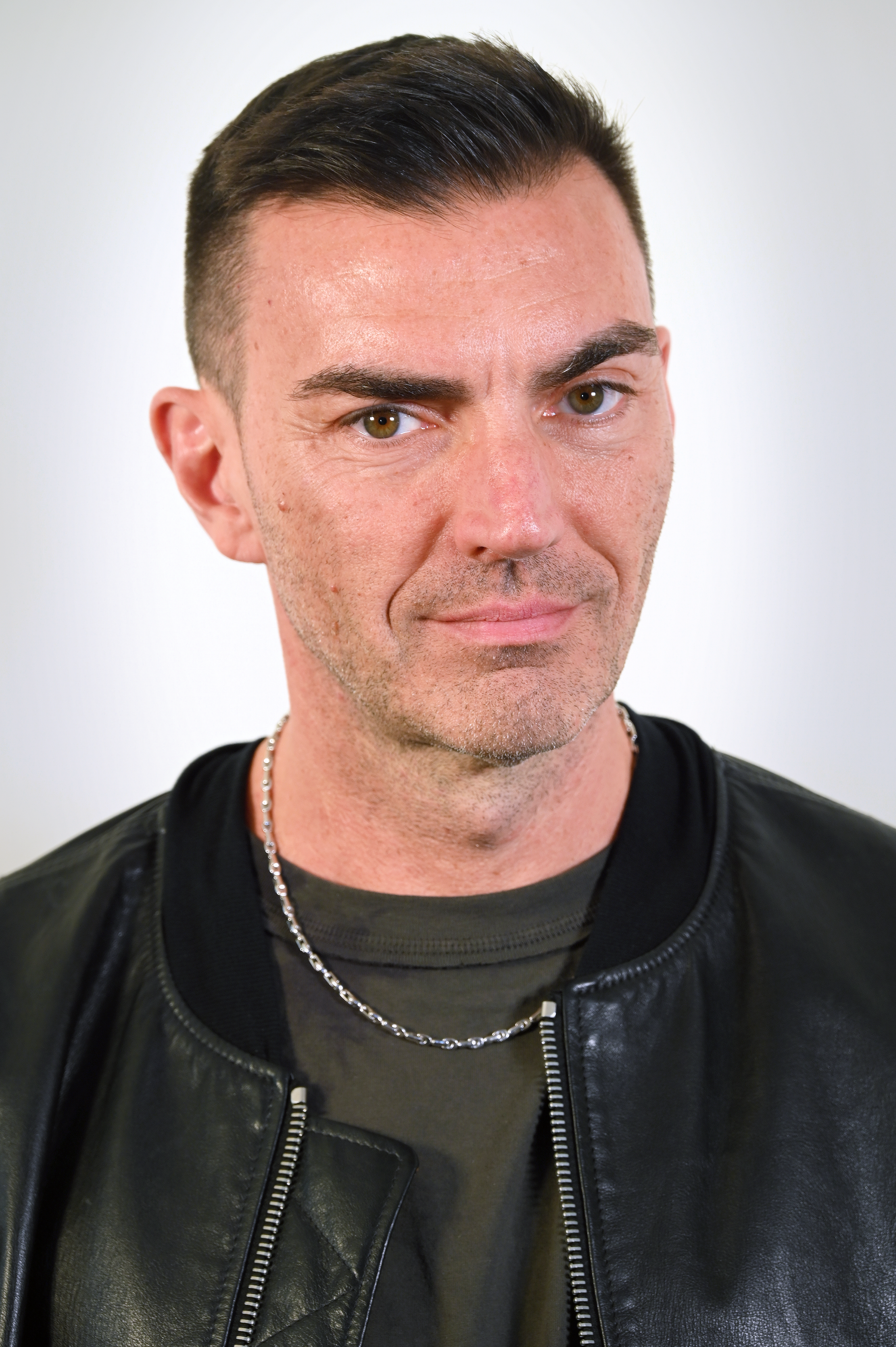
- Ponte in 2025

Background information
- Born: Gabriele Ponte; 20 April 1973 (age 53); Turin, Piedmont, Italy
- Genres: Italo dance; dance; electro house
- Occupations: Musician; DJ; record producer; remixer
- Years active: 1993–present
- Labels: Ultra Records; Dance and Love; Bliss Corporation; Spinnin' Records; Sony Music; Cr2 Records; Armada; GEKAI; Warner Music
- Formerly of: Eiffel 65
- Website: www.gabryponte.com

Gabriele "Gabry" Ponte (Italian pronunciation: [ɡabriˈɛːle ˈɡaːbri ˈponte]; born 20 April 1973) is an Italian musician, DJ and producer, best known as a member of Eiffel 65.

With Eiffel 65's rise to fame in the late 1990s, he later went on to produce the Italian hit singles "Geordie", "Time to Rock", "Got to Get", and "La Danza delle Streghe", along with a number of remixes of popular songs. In 2005, Ponte announced he would be separating from Eiffel 65 to pursue solo work. In 2006, he founded and still manages record label Dance and Love. He also produced the 2012 international hit "Tacata'" by dance music trio Tacabro, and released his singles "Beat on My Drum" (featuring Pitbull and Sophia del Carmen) and "Buonanotte Giorno". He represented San Marino in the Eurovision Song Contest 2025 with his song "Tutta l'Italia", in which he qualified for the Grand Final and placed 26th (last) with 27 points.

He entered the Top 100 DJs list from DJ Mag as of 2014.

== Career ==
=== 1997–2003 ===
In 1997 he formed the group Eiffel 65 with Jeffrey Jey and Maurizio Lobina. The group's debut single, "Blue (Da Ba Dee)", was released the following year and topped the worldwide charts and sold over 8 million copies; their first album Europop sold another 4 million copies. In the year 2000, they won the European Music Award as the "Best Italian Artist In The World".

He later went on to produce the 2001 Italian hit single "Geordie" (a cover of Fabrizio De André's song by the same name, sung by Italian vocalist Stefania Piovesan), which was rewarded with gold record for selling over 25,000 copies, as well as the 2001 hit "Got to Get", the 2002 hit "Time to Rock", and the 2003 hit "La Danza delle Streghe" (English: "The Dance of the Witches"). Also to his credit are a number of remixes of popular songs such as the 2003 singles for Gianni Togni's "Giulia" and O-Zone's "Dragostea Din Tei", among others.

=== 2005–2009 ===
In 2005, Ponte announced he would be separating from Eiffel 65 to pursue solo work. In 2006, he founded and still manages record label Dance and Love, nowadays one of the most important Italian dance independent labels. He would release a song called "Vivi Nell'Aria" featuring Miani to Zooland Records. The song samples "The Moon" by ItaloBrothers.

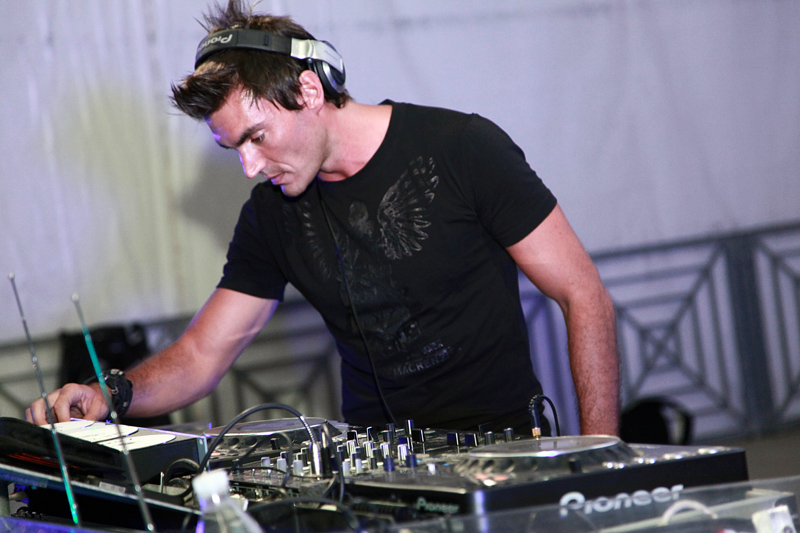
Gabry Ponte in 2011

=== 2012–2014 ===
In 2012, Ponte released his single "Beat on My Drum" featuring Pitbull and Sophia del Carmen, which peaked at No. 11 on the US Hot Dance Club Songs. In January 2012, he also produced the international hit "Tacata'" by dance music trio Tacabro.

Meanwhile, Ponte started his solo projects, and his first singles and remixes stormed the European charts. In 2014, his single "Buonanotte Giorno" became a summer hit in Italy, reaching the top 10 in the country. In the same year, he entered the Top 100 DJs chart from DJ Mag at No. 61, also as the highest-ranked Italian.

=== 2021–present ===
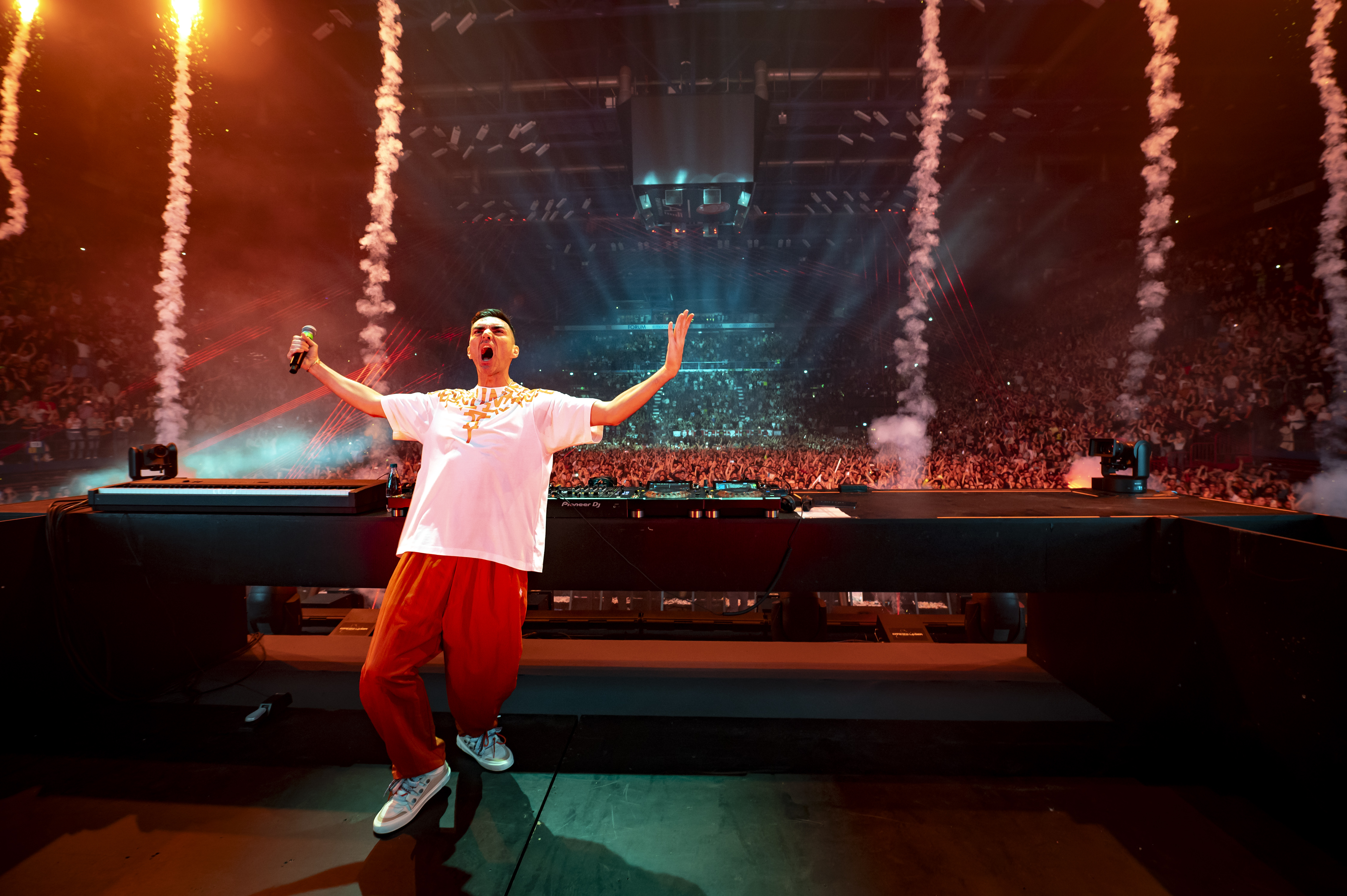
Ponte in 2024

His most successful collaborations include the 2021 singles "Thunder" with LUM!X and Prezioso and "Can't Get Over You" with Aloe Blacc. The 2022 singles "Call Me" with Timmy Trumpet and R3HAB, "The Finger" with Georgia Ku, and the summer hit "We Could Be Together" together with LUM!X and Daddy DJ, already GOLD record in Italy, The Netherlands, Belgium and France.

In 2022, he represented Austria in the Eurovision Song Contest 2022 as a co-writer and producer of the song "Halo", performed by Lumix and Pia Maria. Among the last club releases were collaborations with artists such a Blasterjaxx, Justus, DJs From Mars, Vini Vici and official remixes for Sigala, Sam Feldt and David Guetta with his global hit "I'm Good".

On 6 December, Ponte released a dedicated song to Spotify Wrapped 2023: "Losing You – Spotify Singles", celebrating the Police track "Every Breath You Take" 40 years since its release. From a live perspective, in 2023, Ponte performed 90 shows in 11 countries, in front of over 700,000 people dancing.

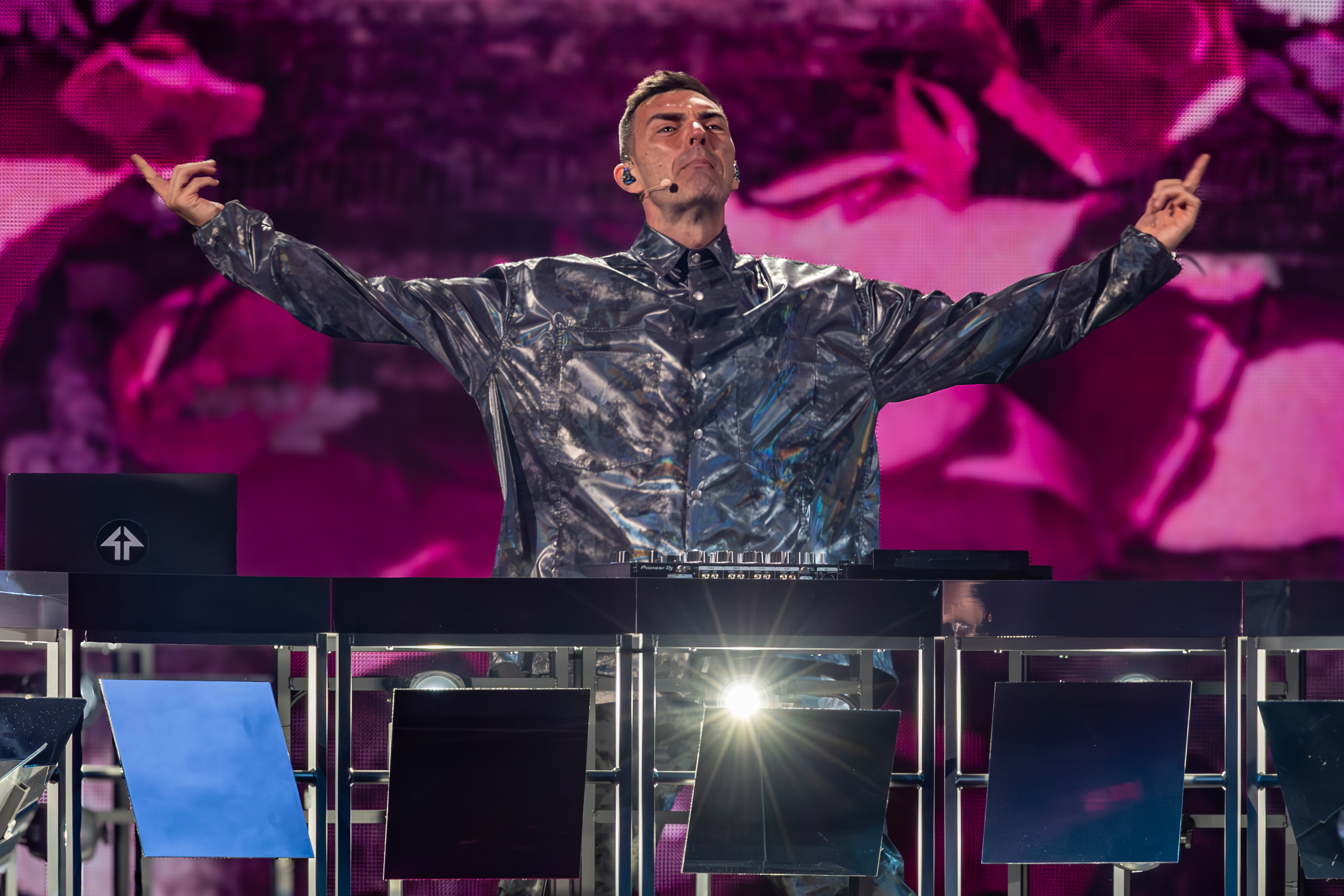
Ponte performing at the Eurovision 2025

In 2025, Ponte won the right to represent San Marino in the Eurovision Song Contest 2025 with the song "Tutta l'Italia", which had previously been composed as the theme for that year's Sanremo Music Festival. He was driving his daughter to the park when he played the song for her. When the song ended, she said, "Daddy, play it again." On 13 May 2025, Ponte performed in the first semifinal, where he qualified to the grand final, becoming the fourth representative of San Marino to do so. Ponte placed 26th with 27 points.

He was the DJ for the closing ceremony of the 2026 Winter Olympics.

== Discography ==
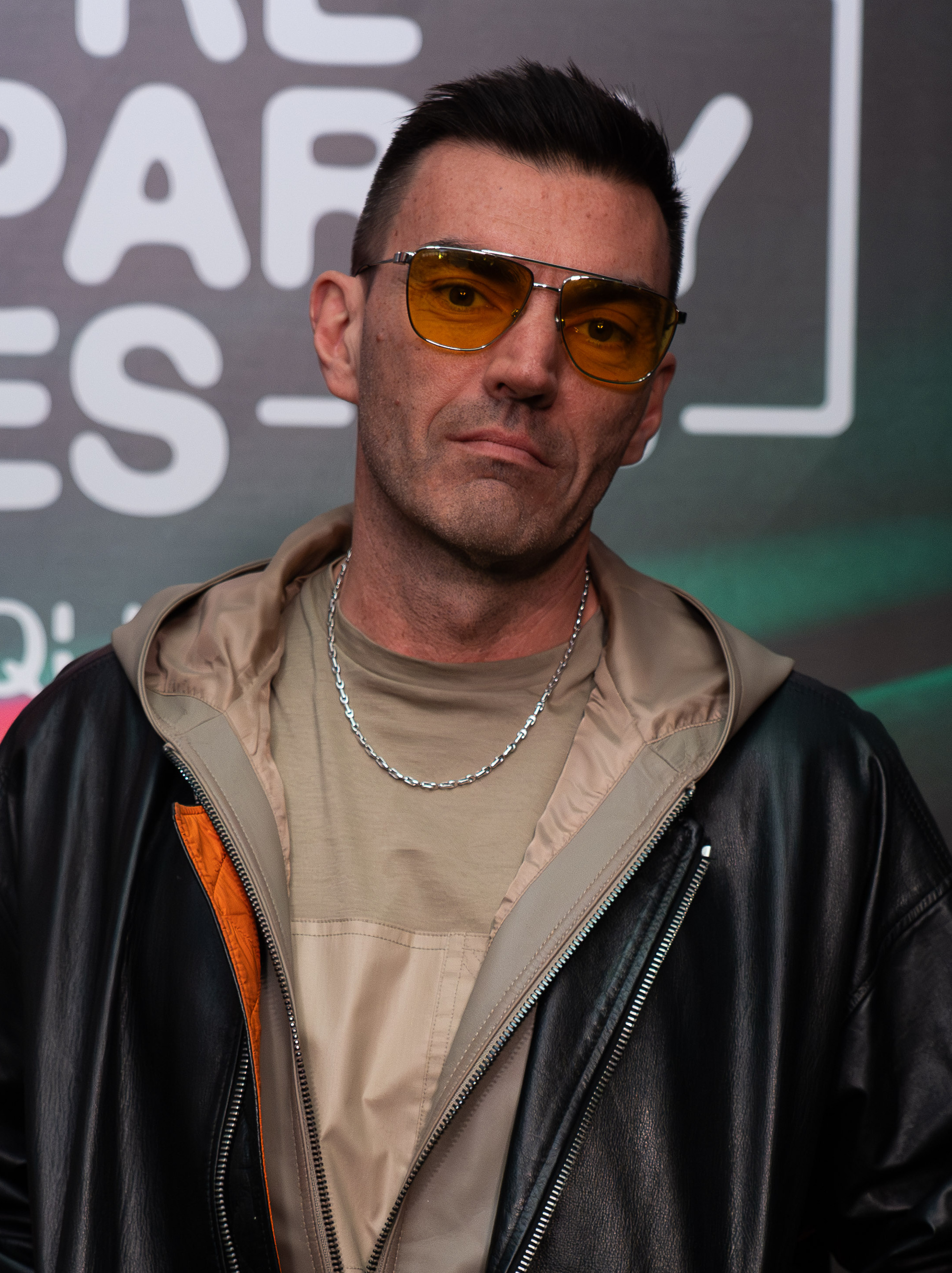
Ponte in 2025

=== Albums ===
List of studio albums, with selected chart positions
Title	Year	Peak chart positions
Title	Year	ITA
Gabry Ponte	2002	16
Dr. Jekyll and Mr. DJ	2004	17
Gabry2o	2008	34

Other albums

- Modern Tech Noises According to Gabry Ponte (2007)
- Love Songs in the Digital Age According to Gabry Ponte (2007)
- Tunes from Planet Earth According to Gabry Ponte (2007)
- Gabry Ponte – Gabry2o Vol. 2 (2009)
- Dance & Love albums series:
  - Gabry Ponte pres. Dance & Love Selection Vol. 1 (2010)
  - Gabry Ponte pres. Dance & Love Selection Vol. 2 (2010)
  - Gabry Ponte pres. Dance & Love Selection Vol. 3 (2010)
  - Gabry Ponte pres. Dance & Love Selection Vol. 4 (2011)

=== Extended plays ===
- 2006: Modern Tech Noises According to Gabry Ponte
- 2007: Love Songs in the Digital Age according to Gabry Ponte Containing: "Now & Forever" / "The Point of No Return" / "The Point of No Return (Bufalo & D-Deck Remix)" / "La Libertà" (Hard Love Remix) / "Geordie" (Eurotrance Remix)
- 2007: Tunes from Planet Earth According to Gabry Ponte
- 2018: Dance Lab

=== Singles ===
List of singles, with selected chart positions and certifications
Title	Year	Peak chart positions										Certifications	Album
Title	Year	ITA	AUT	BEL (Wa)	FRA	GER	LTU	NLD	NOR	SWE	SWI	Certifications	Album
"Time to Rock"	2002	33	—	—	—	—	—	—	—	—	—		Gabry Ponte
"Geordie"	2002	9	—	—	—	—	—	—	—	—	—		Gabry Ponte
"De musica tonante"	2003	13	—	—	—	—	—	—	—	—	—		Gabry Ponte
"Music" (with Fargetta)	2003	75	—	—	—	—	—	—	—	—	—		Gabry Ponte
"The Man in the Moon"	2003	30	—	—	—	—	—	—	—	—	—		Gabry Ponte
"Giulia" (with DJ Lhasa)	2003	16	—	—	—	—	—	—	—	—	—		Non-album single
"La danza delle streghe"	2003	7	—	—	—	—	—	—	—	—	—	FIMI: Gold	Dr. Jekyll & Mister DJ
"Figli di Pitagora" (featuring Little Tony)	2004	13	—	—	66	—	—	—	—	—	—		Dr. Jekyll & Mister DJ
"Sin pararse" (with Ye Man)	2004	20	—	—	—	—	—	—	—	—	—		Non-album single
"Depends on You"	2005	13	—	—	—	—	—	—	—	—	—		Dr. Jekyll & Mister DJ
"Sono già solo (Remix)"	2010	51	—	—	—	—	—	—	—	—	—		Dance and Love – The Selection Vol. 3
"Beat on My Drum" (featuring Pitbull and Sophia Del Carmen)	2012	85	—	—	—	—	—	—	—	—	—		Non-album singles
"La fine del mondo" (featuring Two Fingerz)	2014	7	—	—	—	—	—	—	—	—	—		Non-album singles
"Buonanotte giorno"	2014	7	—	—	—	—	—	—	—	—	—		Non-album singles
"Che ne sanno i 2000" (featuring Danti)	2016	22	—	—	—	—	—	—	—	—	—	FIMI: 2× Platinum	Non-album singles
"Tu sei" (featuring Danti)	2017	45	—	—	—	—	—	—	—	—	—	FIMI: Gold	Non-album singles
"Monster" (with Lum!x)	2019	—	52	37	41	20	—	—	—	— (Note: "Monster" did not enter the Swedish Singellista Chart, but peaked at number nine on the Swedish Heatseeker Chart.)	55	FIMI: Gold; BVMI: 2× Platinum; IFPI AUT: 3× Platinum; SNEP: Diamond	Non-album singles
"The Passenger (LaLaLa)" (with Lum!x and Mokaby and D.T.E)	2020	—	47	—	128	58	—	—	—	—	—	BVMI: Gold; IFPI AUT: Platinum	Non-album singles
"Lonely" (with Jerome)	2020	—	—	—	—	77	—	—	—	—	—		Non-album singles
"Golden" (with Blasterjaxx featuring Riell)	2021	—	—	—	—	—	—	—	—	—	—		Non-album singles
"Oh La La" (with Moti featuring Mougleta)	2021	—	—	—	—	—	—	—	—	—	—		Non-album singles
"Going Down" (with Lucky Luke and Kevin Palms)	2021	—	—	—	—	—	—	—	—	—	—		Non-album singles
"Thunder" (with Lum!x and Prezioso)	2021	42	36	5	18	79	—	14	5	7	20	FIMI: 2× Platinum; BVMI: Gold; IFPI AUT: Platinum; IFPI NOR: 3× Platinum; SNEP: Diamond	Non-album singles
"The Portrait (Ooh La La)" (with R3hab)	2021	—	—	—	—	—	—	—	—	—	—		Non-album singles
"Superman" (with Roberto Molinaro)	2021	—	—	—	—	—	—	—	—	—			Non-album singles
"The Feeling" (with Henri PFR)	2021	—	—	40	—	—	—	—	—	—	—		Non-album singles
"Can't Get Over You" (featuring Aloe Blacc)	2021	—	—	—	—	—	—	—	—	—	—		Non-album singles
"Call Me" (with R3hab and Timmy Trumpet)	2022	—	—	—	—	—	—	80	—	—	—		Non-album singles
"Hasta La Vista" (with Blasterjaxx)	2022	—	—	—	—	—	—	—	—	—	—		Non-album singles
"We Could Be Together" (with Lum!x and Daddy DJ)	2022	93	—	—	96	—	—	34	—	—	—	FIMI: Gold; SNEP: Gold	Non-album singles
"Rely on Me" (with Sigala and Alex Gaudino)	2022	—	—	—	—	—	—	—	—	—	—		Every Cloud – Silver Linings
"Dance Dance" (with Alessandra)	2023	—	—	—	—	—	—	—	—	—	—		Non-album singles
"Let You Down" (with Dvbbs featuring Sofiloud)	2024	—	—	—	—	—	—	—	—	—	—		Non-album singles
"Born to Love Ya" (with Sean Paul and Natti Natasha)	2024	—	—	—	—	—	—	76	—	—	—		Non-album singles
"Tutta l'Italia"	2025	14	—	—	—	—	32	—	—	91	—	FIMI: Platinum	Non-album singles
"Exotica"	2025	—	—	—	94	—	—	—	—	—	—	SNEP: Gold	Non-album singles
"Brokenhearted" (with Train)	2025	—	—	—	—	—	—	—	—	—	—		Non-album singles
"Rave Music" (with Nicky Romero)	2025	—	—	—	—	—	—	—	—	—	—		Non-album singles
"Pretty Woman (All Around the World)" (with Azteck and Pitbull)	2025	—	—	—	—	—	—	—	—	—	—		Non-album singles
"I Don't Know" (with Erika)	2025	—	—	—	—	—	—	—	—	—	—		Non-album singles
"Tik Tak" (with Salmo)	2026	—	—	—	—	—	—	—	—	—	—		Non-album singles
"—" denotes a recording that did not chart or was not released.

Other releases

- 2009: "U.N.D.E.R.G.R.O.U.N.D."
- 2009: "Electro Muzik is Back"
- 2010: "Sexy DJ (In da Club)" (featuring Maya Days)
- 2020: "Opera" (with La Diva)
- 2020: "Rockin' Around the Christmas Tree" (Gabry Ponte edit) (by Harris & Ford)

In 2022, Ponte released "Friendships (Lost My Love) ft. Leony", a remix of "Friendships (Lost My Love) ft. Leony" from Pascal Letoublon, itself a remix of Letoublon's 2017 instrumental release "Friendships".

== Awards and nominations ==
Year	Award	Category	Nominee(s)	Result	Ref.
2025	Eurovision Awards	Certified Banger	Himself	Nominated	

== Notes ==
Awards and achievements
Preceded by Megara with "11:11"	San Marino in the Eurovision Song Contest; 2025	Succeeded by Senhit & Boy George with "Superstar"
