= Paps'n'Skar =

Italian dance music group

- Also known as: Sally Can Dance
- Origin: Italy
- Genres: Italo dance; EDM; dance-pop
- Years active: 1997–2017
- Labels: Time; Warner Music; p'n's
- Members: Emanuele Cozzi; Davide Scarpulla
- Website: www.papsnskar.com

Paps'n'Skar was an Italian dance music group.
It was initially called Sally Can Dance, a name that the band also used later.

The group was formed in 1994 by former schoolmates Emanuele Cozzi ("Paps") and Davide Scarpulla ("Skar"). Their first single, "Because I'm Free", was released in 1997. Following this they released several further singles; the 2005 single "Vieni con me" hit #2 in Italy. The band released their first and only studio album, Uno, in 2005.

== Singles ==
List of singles as lead artist, with selected chart positions, showing year released and album name
Title	Year	Peak chart positions					Album
Title	Year	IT	AUT	DEN	FRA	GER	Album
"Because I'm Free"	1998	–	–	–	–	–	
"You Want My Love (Din Don Da Da)"	1999	–	–	–	–	–	
"Turn Around"	2000	–	–	–	–	–	
"Get It On"	2001	31	–	10	47	–	
"Loving You"	2002	33	–	–	–	–	
"Love Is Love"	2003	–	–	–	–	–	
"Che Vuoto Che C'è"	2003	37	–	–	–	–	
"Mon Amour"	2003	–	–	–	–	–	
"Mirage (stasera la luna)"	2004	20	46	–	–	87	Uno
"Vieni con me"	2005	2	–	–	–	–	Uno
"Balla (come sei bella)"	2006	15	–	–	–	–	
"Ti ricordi quella volta"	2007	28	–	–	–	–	
"Bambina"	2008	–	–	–	–	–	
"La Dance"	2009	–	–	–	–	–	
"Spazio Fratto Tempo"	2010	–	–	–	–	–	
"La Cicala Greca"	2011	–	–	–	–	–	
"Twilight Of Love"	2012	–	–	–	–	–	
"Wake Up" (feat. Mario Romano)	2013	–	–	–	–	–	
