= George Woodcock (cricketer) =

English cricketer (1894–1968)

Personal information
- Full name: George Woodcock
- Born: 21 April 1894; Warrington, Lancashire, England
- Died: 22 February 1968 (aged 73); Bruton, Somerset, England
- Batting: Right-handed
- Bowling: Right-arm medium pace

Domestic team information
- Years: Team
- 1921: Somerset

Career statistics
Competition	FC
Matches	1
Runs scored	68
Batting average	34.00
100s/50s	0/1
Top score	63
Balls bowled	228
Wickets	4
Bowling average	29.75
5 wickets in innings	0
10 wickets in match	0
Best bowling	4/119
Catches/stumpings	0/–
- Source: CricketArchive, 22 December 2015

George Woodcock (21 April 1894 – 22 February 1968) played first-class cricket in one match for Somerset in 1921. He was born at Warrington, then in Lancashire, and died at Bruton, Somerset.

Woodcock was a right-handed lower-order batsman and a right-arm medium-pace bowler. His single first-class cricket appearance was as a member of what was, according to Wisden Cricketers' Almanack, "a very weak Somerset team" in the match against Cambridge University at Cambridge in May 1921. Somerset were beaten by an innings within two days, but Woodcock's own contribution was not insubstantial. In the first innings, he made only five, but his medium pace bowling took four of the seven Cambridge wickets to fall. Then, when Somerset fell to 84 for eight wickets in the second innings, requiring 301 to make Cambridge bat again and with Cuthbert Fairbanks-Smith unable to bat, Woodcock and Edward Baker, a pre-First World War Cambridge cricketer also playing his only match for Somerset, put on 128 for the ninth (and last) wicket, each of them making 63.

Despite this personal success, Woodcock never played first-class cricket again.
