= Tacata' =

2012 single by Romano & Sapienza feat. Rodríguez

- Cover of Italian single

Single by Romano & Sapienza featuring Rodríguez
- Released: 5 January 2012 (Italy); April 2012 (Switzerland)
- Recorded: 2011
- Genre: House; dance-pop
- Length: 3:30
- Composers: Mario Romano; Salvatore Sapienza
- Lyricist: Raúl Rodríguez Martínez
- Producers: Gabry Ponte; Mario Romano; Salvatore Sapienza

Music video
- "Tacata'" by Romano & Sapienza featuring Rodriguez on YouTube

"Tacata'"
- Cover of French single

Single by Tacabro
- Released: 23 April 2012 (France); April 2012 (Switzerland)
- Recorded: 2012
- Genre: Pop
- Length: 3:30
- Label: 541 / N.E.W.S. (Italy, France, Sweden); Sony Music (Denmark); Catchy Tunes (Sweden); Ultra Records (U.S.)
- Composers: Mario Romano; Salvatore Sapienza
- Lyricist: Raúl Rodríguez Martínez
- Producers: Gabry Ponte; Mario Romano; Salvatore Sapienza

Music video
- "Tacata'" by Tacabro on YouTube

"Tacata'" (alternatively spelled "Tacatà" or "Tacatá") is an international hit released in 2012 by Italian duo Tacabro (then known as Romano & Sapienza) featuring vocals by Cuban singer Ruly MC (then known as Martínez Rodríguez). The music was composed by the Italian DJs, while the lyrics by the Cuban rapper. It was released through 541 / N.E.W.S. labels in Italy, France and Sweden, and through Sony Music in Denmark.

"Tacata'" was originally a hit in Italy and was credited to "Romano & Sapienza featuring Rodríguez" reaching #4 on the Italian Singles Chart. The same name was used for the initial Swiss record. Releases on other European charts were credited to the act name "Tacabro" and charted as such in France, Denmark and Sweden. The song has gained recognition in North America, reaching #83 in Canada where it was the most popular outside Europe.

== Music video ==
Two separate music videos were released for "Tacata'" produced by "DanceandLove", the first in January 2012 and the second in February 2012. The videos are directed by Alex Bufalo and DOP by Francesco Fracchionio. The music videos show Martínez Rodríguez singing and dancing in front of a banner reading Tacabro or through visual effects in the background. With Rodríguez dancing to "Tacata'", there is also vocal as well as music accompaniment and mixing by Mario Romano and Salvatore Sapienza. In other scenes from the music video, Martínez Rodríguez is joined in by other girls dancing with him.

== Cover versions, remixes and samples ==
DJ Adam released his own remixed version entitled "Tacata" on 23 April 2012 on "Beat Factory" label that appeared at #187 in the French Singles Top 200 and rising to #133 during May 2012.

Mr. Takatà released a cover version as "Tacatà". This version charted in the French Singles Top 200 for one week reaching number 114. It also charted in Austrian Singles Chart for two weeks reaching number 57.

Japanese pop group MAX sampled the song under the same title for their comeback in 2013.

== Releases ==
=== Singles ===
Tacata' (by Tacabro)

1. "Tacata'" (4:49)

Tacata' (by Tacabro feat. Rodriguez)

1. "Tacata'" (Radio edit) (3:30)
2. "Tacata'" (Extended mix) (4:44)

=== EPs ===
Tacata' Remixes

1. "Tacata'" (Radio Edit) (3:30)
2. "Tacata'" (Extended) (4:44)
3. "Tacata'" (Stylus Josh, Eros Remix) (5:34)
4. "Tacata'" (Marco Branky Radio Remix) (3:34)
5. "Tacata'" (Marco Branky Remix) (5:02)
6. "Tacata'" (Karmin Shiff Remix) (6:09)
7. "Tacata'" (DJ Willy Remix) (5:31)
8. "Tacata'" (Dany Lorence Remix) (4:50)
9. "Tacata'" (El Berna Jam) (3:31)
10. "Tacata'" Video (3:46)
11. "Tacata'" (Whoami Remix By Victote and Usra) (3:19)
12. "Tacata'" (TOMER G & Gilad M Stadium Remake) (3:38)
13. "Tacata'" (TOMER G & Marko Stadium Remix Extended) (5:30)

=== Appearances ===
"Tacatà" Radio edit version credited to "Tacabro featuring Rodríguez" appears as title track in the compilation albums Tacatà Compilation and Latino - Greatest Hits 2012 Vol. 2.

== Charts ==
Originally released in Italy on 5 January 2012, it became a hit in Italy, and in many dance venues all over Europe. The song reached number 4 on the Italian Singles Chart and number one on the Danish Singles Chart for three consecutive weeks in April and May 2012.

In France for the initial three weeks, two versions were in the French SNEP charts. On 21 April 2012, the two versions appeared at #98 and #134 simultaneously in first week of release. On chart dated 28 April they both appeared at numbers 50 and 65 and for chart dated 5 May 2012 at numbers 33 and 42 simultaneously. But SNEP coupled both listing into one for chart dated 12 May 2012, with the single rising to number 6 in the French chart.

=== Romano & Sapienza feat. Rodríguez version ===
Chart (2012)	Peak position
Italy (FIMI)	4
Poland Dance (ZPAV)	1
Switzerland (Schweizer Hitparade)	67

=== Tacabro version ===
Chart (2012–2013)	Peak position
Argentina (Argentina Top 20)	1
Austria (Ö3 Austria Top 75)	1
Belgium (Ultratop 50 Flanders)	5
Belgium (Ultratop 40 Wallonia)	5
Canada (Canadian Hot 100)	83
Denmark (Tracklisten)	1
Finland (Suomen virallinen lista)	2
France (SNEP)	1
Germany (Media Control AG)	4
Hungary (Dance Top 40)	1
Hungary (Editors' Choice Top 40)	13
Israel (Media Forest)	1
Luxembourg Digital Songs (Billboard)	1
Netherlands (Dutch Top 40)	3
Netherlands (Single Top 100)	4
Norway (VG-lista)	4
Poland Dance (ZPAV)	2
Russia Airplay (TopHit)	13
Spain (PROMUSICAE)	1
Sweden (Sverigetopplistan)	14
Switzerland (Schweizer Hitparade)	1
Ukraine Airplay (TopHit)	30
US Hot Latin Songs (Billboard)	19

=== Year-end charts ===
Chart (2012)	Position
Austria (Ö3 Austria Top 40)	11
Belgium (Ultratop Flanders)	28
Belgium (Ultratop Wallonia)	18
Germany (Media Control AG)	18
Hungary (Dance Top 40)	5
Netherlands (Dutch Top 40)	47
Netherlands (Single Top 100)	44
Spain (PROMUSICAE)	7
Sweden (Sverigetopplistan)	58
Switzerland (Schweizer Hitparade)	11
Ukraine Airplay (TopHit)	95

== Certifications ==
Region	Certification	Certified units/sales
Belgium (BRMA)	Gold	15,000^{*}
Denmark (IFPI Danmark)	Gold	15,000^{^}
Germany (BVMI)	Platinum	300,000^{^}
Italy (FIMI)	2× Platinum	60,000^{*}
Netherlands (NVPI)	Gold	10,000^{^}
Spain (Promusicae)	Platinum	40,000^{*}
Sweden (GLF)	Platinum	40,000^{‡}
Switzerland (IFPI Switzerland)	2× Platinum	60,000^{^}
Streaming
Denmark (IFPI Danmark)	2× Platinum	3,600,000^{†}
^{*} Sales figures based on certification alone.^{^} Shipments figures based on certification alone.^{‡} Sales+streaming figures based on certification alone.^{†} Streaming-only figures based on certification alone.
