= Lumix (DJ) =

Austrian-Italian DJ and producer (born 2002)

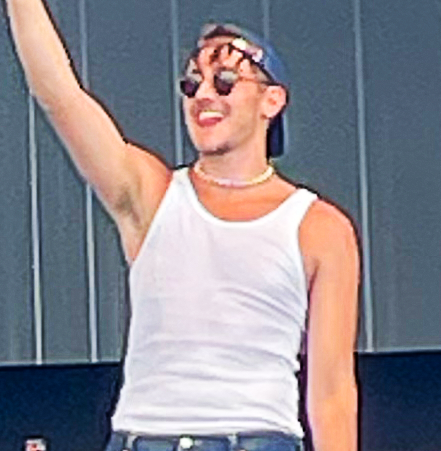
- Lumix in 2023

Background information
- Born: Luca Michlmayr; 23 July 2002 (age 24); Rohrbach-Berg, Austria
- Genres: Dance; Melbourne bounce
- Label: Spinnin'

Luca Michlmayr (born 23 July 2002), known by the stage name Lumix (stylized as LUM!X or Lum!x), is an Austrian-Italian DJ and music producer based in Italy. He is best-known for the hits "Monster" (with Gabry Ponte), "The Passenger" (with Ponte & D.T.E. feat. Mokaby), and "Thunder" (with Ponte and Prezioso). He represented Austria in the Eurovision Song Contest 2022 with the song "Halo", alongside fellow Austrian vocalist Pia Maria.

== Biography ==
Born Luca Michlmayr to an Italian mother, he moved to Turin in 2020 at the age of 18. Lumix began producing his music at the age of 11 and was noticed by the Swedish independent label and network Bounce United, who signed him.

After his bootleg of the song "Monster" by Meg & Dia became a viral hit on YouTube, he remixed it with Italian musician Gabry Ponte and released the new version as a single through Spinnin' Records. With over 70 weeks in the German singles chart, "Monster" is also one of the songs with the longest time in the German singles chart.

== Discography ==
=== Singles ===
List of singles as lead artist, with selected chart positions, showing year released and album name
| Title | Year | Peak chart positions | | | | | | | | | | Certifications |
| Title | Year | AUT | BEL (WA) | DEN | FRA | GER | ITA | NLD | POL | SWE | SWI | Certifications |
|---|---|---|---|---|---|---|---|---|---|---|---|---|
| "Elements" | 2017 | — | — | — | — | — | — | — | — | — | — | |
| "Bounce United (700K)" | 2018 | — | — | — | — | — | — | — | — | — | — | |
| "Bounce United (1 Million)" (with Helion and Mike Emilio) | 2018 | — | — | — | — | — | — | — | — | — | — | |
| "Underground" (with MOHA) | 2018 | — | — | — | — | — | — | — | — | — | — | |
| "Jägermeister" | 2019 | — | — | — | — | — | — | — | — | — | — | |
| "Waiting for Me" (with MOHA) | 2019 | — | — | — | — | — | — | — | — | — | — | |
| "Monster" (with Gabry Ponte) | 2019 | 52 | 37 | — | 41 | 20 | — | — | 80 | — | 55 | IFPI AUT: 3× Platinum; BVMI: 2× Platinum; FIMI: Gold; IFPI DEN: Gold; IFPI SWI: Gold; SNEP: Diamond; ZPAV: 2× Platinum |
| "The Passenger (LaLaLa)" (with Gabry Ponte & D.T.E., featuring Mokaby) | 2020 | 47 | — (Note: "The Passenger (LaLaLa)" did not enter the Ultratop Walloon 50 Singles chart, but peaked at No. 30 on the Walloon Ultratip Bubbling Under 50 chart.) | — | 128 | 58 | — | — | 10 | — | — | IFPI AUT: Platinum; BVMI: Gold; ZPAV: Platinum |
| "Scare Me" (with KSHMR & Gabry Ponte, featuring Karra) | 2020 | — | — | — | — | — | — | — | 25 | — | — | ZPAV: Gold |
| "Major Tom" (with Hyperclap, featuring Peter Schilling) | 2021 | — | — | — | — | — | — | — | — | — | — | |
| "Annie Are You Ok" (with Nick Strand and Mio) | 2021 | — | — | — | — | — | — | — | — | — | — | |
| "Secrets" (with Solo) | 2021 | — | — | — | — | — | — | — | — | — | — | |
| "Thunder" (with Gabry Ponte and Prezioso) | 2021 | 36 | 5 | 18 | 18 | 79 | 42 | 14 | 24 | 7 | 20 | IFPI AUT: Gold; BVMI: Gold; FIMI: 2× Platinum; IFPI DEN: Gold; IFPI SWE: Gold; SNEP: Diamond |
| "Champion (Summer 2021 LEC Playoffs Anthem)" (with Orange INC and Séb Mont) | 2021 | — | — | — | — | — | — | — | — | — | — | |
| "Trick or Treat" (with Molow) | 2021 | — | — | — | — | — | — | — | — | — | — | |
| "Low" (with DJ Fire House and MOTi) | 2021 | — | — | — | — | — | — | — | — | — | — | |
| "Halo" (with Pia Maria) | 2022 | 6 | — | — | — | — | — | — | 35 | — | — | IFPI AUT: Gold |
| "We Could Be Together" (with Gabry Ponte and Daddy DJ) | 2022 | — | — | — | 96 | — | 93 | 34 | — | — | — | SNEP: Gold |
| "Where Do We Go" (with Dvbbs) | 2022 | — | — | — | — | — | — | — | — | — | — | |
| "Forget You" (with Gabry Ponte and Alida) | 2023 | — | — | — | — | — | — | — | — | — | — | |
| "Take Me Higher" (with Des3tt and Georgia Meek) | 2023 | — | — | — | — | — | — | — | — | — | — | |
| "Electric Love" (with Lawrent) | 2023 | — | — | — | — | — | — | — | — | — | — | |
| "Burn" (featuring Seb Mont) | 2023 | — | — | — | — | — | — | — | — | — | — | |
| "Techno Sound" | 2023 | — | — | — | — | — | — | — | — | — | — | |
| "Kids Like Us" (featuring Lucid and Friends) | 2023 | — | — | — | — | — | — | — | — | — | — | |
| "Fireflies" (with Jordan Rys) | 2023 | — | — | — | — | — | — | — | — | — | — | |
| "Troublemaker" (with Michael Schulte and Paradigm) | 2024 | — | — | — | — | — | — | — | — | — | — | |
| "Can't Forget You" (with Lucas & Steve) | 2024 | — | — | — | — | — | — | — | — | — | — | |
| "Gonna Dance with Somebody" (with Alle Farben and Noel Holler) | 2024 | — | — | — | — | — | — | — | — | — | — | |
| "Even God" (with Jayover) | 2025 | — | — | — | — | — | — | — | — | — | — | |
| "Illusion" | 2025 | — | — | — | — | — | — | — | — | — | — | |
| "Stronger" (with Luca-Dante Spadafora and Justin Jesso) | 2025 | — | — | — | — | — | — | — | — | — | — | |
| "I Don't Even Like You" | 2026 | — | — | — | — | — | — | — | — | — | — | |
"—" denotes a single that did not chart or was not released in that territory.

== Awards and nominations ==
| Year | Ceremony | Category | Work | Result | Ref. |
|---|---|---|---|---|---|
| 2023 | Amadeus Austrian Music Awards | Song of the Year | "Halo" | Won | |
| 2023 | Amadeus Austrian Music Awards | Electronic/Dance | "Halo" | Won | |
| 2020 | French Fun Radio DJ Awards | Meilleure révélation (Best revelation) | Himself | Won | |
| 2021 | Amadeus Austrian Music Awards | Electronic/Dance | Himself | Nominated | |

== Notes ==
| Preceded by Vincent Bueno with "Amen" | Austria in the Eurovision Song Contest (with Pia Maria); 2022 | Succeeded by Teya and Salena with "Who the Hell Is Edgar?" |
