= Thunder (Gabry Ponte, Lumix and Prezioso song) =

2021 song by Gabry Ponte, Lumix and Prezioso

Single by Gabry Ponte, Lumix and Prezioso
- Released: 7 May 2021
- Recorded: April 2019
- Genre: Psychedelic trance
- Length: 2:40
- Label: Spinnin'
- Songwriters: Alessandro Hueber; Andrea Di Gregorio; Cristiano Cesario; Fatin Shady Cherkaoui; Gabriele Ponte; Giorgio Prezioso; Lorenzo Ohler; Marco Quisisana
- Producers: Andrea Di Gregorio; Cristiano Cesario; Gabry Ponte; Lumix; Marco Quisisana; Prezioso

Gabry Ponte singles chronology
"Going Down" (2021)	"Thunder" (2021)	"The Portrait (Ooh La La)" (2021)

Dance video
- "Thunder" on YouTube

"Thunder" is a song by Italian DJs Gabry Ponte and Prezioso (a member of dance trio Prezioso & Marvin) and Austrian DJ Lumix. It was released as a single on 7 May 2021 via Spinnin' Records. The song reached the top 10 in Belgium, the Netherlands, Norway and Sweden.

== Composition ==
According to a press release, the song contains "dramatic percussion and uptempo female vocals" and "the beat is dropped in characteristic triplet style" (effectively quadruple compound time). It is written in the key of B-flat minor, with a tempo of 135 beats per minute.

== Track listing ==
Digital download and streaming
No.	Title	Length
1.	"Thunder"	2:40

Digital download and streaming – Extended mix
No.	Title	Length
1.	"Thunder" (Extended mix)	3:37

== Credits and personnel ==
Credits adapted from Tidal.

- Andrea Di Gregorio – producer, writer
- Cristiano Cesario – producer, writer
- Gabry Ponte – producer, writer, programmer
- Lumix – producer, programmer
- Marco Quisisana – producer, writer
- Prezioso – producer, writer, programmer
- Daniele Mattiuzzi – mastering, mixer
- Shibui – vocals
- Alessandro Hueber – writer
- Fatin Shady Cherkaoui – writer
- Lorenzo Ohler – writer

== Charts ==
=== Weekly charts ===
Weekly chart performance for "Thunder"
Chart (2021–2022)	Peak position
Austria (Ö3 Austria Top 40)	36
Belgium (Ultratop 50 Flanders)	4
Belgium (Ultratop 50 Wallonia)	5
Czech Republic Airplay (ČNS IFPI)	1
Czech Republic Singles Digital (ČNS IFPI)	36
Denmark (Tracklisten)	18
France (SNEP)	18
Germany (GfK)	79
Hungary (Single Top 40)	29
Italy (FIMI)	42
Luxembourg (Billboard)	17
Netherlands (Dutch Top 40)	8
Netherlands (Single Top 100)	14
Norway (VG-lista)	5
Poland Airplay (ZPAV)	24
Slovakia (Singles Digitál Top 100)	100
Sweden (Sverigetopplistan)	7
Switzerland (Schweizer Hitparade)	20

=== Year-end charts ===
2021 year-end chart performance for "Thunder"
Chart (2021)	Position
Netherlands (Dutch Top 40)	57
Netherlands (Single Top 100)	84
Norway (VG-lista)	17
Sweden (Sverigetopplistan)	33
Switzerland (Schweizer Hitparade)	68

2022 year-end chart performance for "Thunder"
Chart (2022)	Position
Austria (Ö3 Austria Top 40)	52
Belgium (Ultratop 50 Flanders)	16
Belgium (Ultratop 50 Wallonia)	28
Netherlands (Dutch Top 40)	91
Netherlands (Single Top 100)	81
Sweden (Sverigetopplistan)	60
Switzerland (Schweizer Hitparade)	26

== Certifications ==
Certifications for "Thunder"
Region	Certification	Certified units/sales
Austria (IFPI Austria)	Platinum	30,000^{‡}
Denmark (IFPI Danmark)	Platinum	90,000^{‡}
France (SNEP)	Diamond	333,333^{‡}
Germany (BVMI)	Gold	200,000^{‡}
Italy (FIMI)	2× Platinum	200,000^{‡}
New Zealand (RMNZ)	Gold	15,000^{‡}
Norway (IFPI Norway)	3× Platinum	180,000^{‡}
Poland (ZPAV)	2× Platinum	100,000^{‡}
Spain (Promusicae)	Platinum	60,000^{‡}
United Kingdom (BPI)	Silver	200,000^{‡}
^{‡} Sales+streaming figures based on certification alone.
