= Salsa Tequila =

Single by Anders Nilsen
- Released: June 23, 2014
- Recorded: 2014
- Genre: Dance-pop
- Length: 3:19
- Label: Sony Music
- Songwriter: Anders Nilsen
- Producer: Anders Nilsen

Music video
- "Salsa Tequila" on YouTube

"Salsa Tequila" is a novelty song by Norwegian comedian Anders Nilsen in Spanish. He does not speak Spanish, as he admits in the song by saying "No hablo español" (I do not speak Spanish). To make the song catchy, he uses accordion and saxophone mixes, noting that their usage had become prevalent in many recent hits. The song is written and produced by Nilsen and was released in 2014 on Sony Music. It was a huge commercial success in Norway and the Netherlands and has charted in Belgium. The lyric music video is directed by Galvan Mehidi.

== Lyrics ==
Nilsen collected various habitual greetings and words and phrases in Spanish (e.g., muy bueno, sí, hola, dale, Santa María, sombrero, muchas gracias, mi amigo, corazón, desperado, arriba, uno, dos, tres, cuatro, porque, machete, cuanto cuesta, señorita, fútbol), some popular Spanish destinations (Madrid, Mallorca etc.), various traditional Hispanic foods and drinks (as in title salsa and tequila, but also burrito, taco, nachos, mojito, Old El Paso, Tex-Mex, guacamole, jalapeño, enchilada, bacalao, cortado, chorizo, cerveza), some Spanish, Portuguese and Hispanic celebrities (Eva Mendes, Shakira, Adelén, Salma Hayek, Ricky Martin, Antonio Banderas, Las Ketchup, Carlos Santana, Selena Gomez, Ronaldo) and a few Spanish language international hits ("Macarena", "Livin' la Vida Loca", "La Bamba", "Bailando", "Chihuahua", "Gasolina"). The song sometimes repeats and mixes these phrases. For example, the term "tequila" appears in the song title, chorus and bridge. A Spanish count-off appears twice in the song, in the second verse (Uno, dos, tres, cuatro, Tony Montana) and in the bridge (Uno, dos, tres, ¡tequila!).

The song is a parody of club songs (former 'summer hits'), with the message that a song could become a hit even if the lyrics do not make any sense.

== Track list ==
1. "Salsa Tequila" (3:19)

== Charts ==
=== Weekly charts ===
| Chart (2014) | Peak position |
|---|---|
| Belgium (Ultratop 50 Flanders) | 29 |
| Finland (Suomen virallinen lista) | 18 |
| Germany (GfK) | 72 |
| Netherlands (Dutch Top 40) | 1 |
| Netherlands (Single Top 100) | 2 |
| Norway (VG-lista) | 1 |
| Sweden (Sverigetopplistan) | 52 |

=== Year-end charts ===
| Chart (2014) | Position |
|---|---|
| Netherlands (Dutch Top 40) | 36 |
| Netherlands (Single Top 100) | 27 |

== See also ==
- The Manual
- Nonsense verse
- Prisencolinensinainciusol
