= Beat on My Drum =

Single by Gabry Ponte and Sophia Del Carmen featuring Pitbull
- Released: May 8, 2012
- Recorded: 2011
- Genre: Latin pop; electro house
- Length: 3:44
- Label: Exit 8 Media Group; Dance & Love; Mr. 305 Inc.
- Songwriters: Armando Perez; Gabriele Ponte; Jose Perroni; Noel Fischer; Sofia Redondo
- Producer: Gabry Ponte

Pitbull singles chronology
"There She Goes" (2012)	"Beat on My Drum" (2012)	"Get It Started" (2012)

"Beat on My Drum" is a song by Italian DJ Gabry Ponte, released as a single on May 8, 2012. The song features vocals from Sophia Del Carmen and American rapper Pitbull.

== Track listing ==
- Digital download
1. "Beat on My Drum" (featuring Pitbull and Sophia Del Carmen) – 3:44
- CD single
1. "Beat on My Drum" (Original US Radio Spanish) – 3:44
2. "Beat on My Drum" (Original US Radio English)" – 3:44
- Remixes - EP
1. "Beat on My Drum" (Eu Radio Edit) - 3:47
2. "Beat on My Drum" (Eu Extended Spanish) - 4:43
3. "Beat on My Drum" (Gabry Ponte Club Mix Radio Spanish) - 3:02
4. "Beat on My Drum" (Gabry Ponte Club Mix Extended Spanish) - 5:16
5. "Beat on My Drum" (DJs from Mars Remix Radio) - 3:03
6. "Beat on My Drum" (DJs from Mars Remix Extended) - 6:06

== Credits and personnel ==
- Lead vocals – Pitbull and Sophia Del Carmen
- Producers – Gabry Ponte
- Lyrics – Armando Perez, Gabriele Ponte, Jose Perroni, Noel Fischer and Sofia Redondo
- Label – Exit 8 Media Group, Dance & Love Recorder

== Charts ==
Chart (2012)	Peak position
Israel International Airplay (Media Forest)	3
US Hot Dance Club Songs (Billboard)	11

== Release history ==
Region	Date	Format	Label
United States	May 8, 2012	Digital Download	Exit 8 Media Group, Dance & Love
