= Thorsteinn Einarsson =

Austrian–Icelandic musician

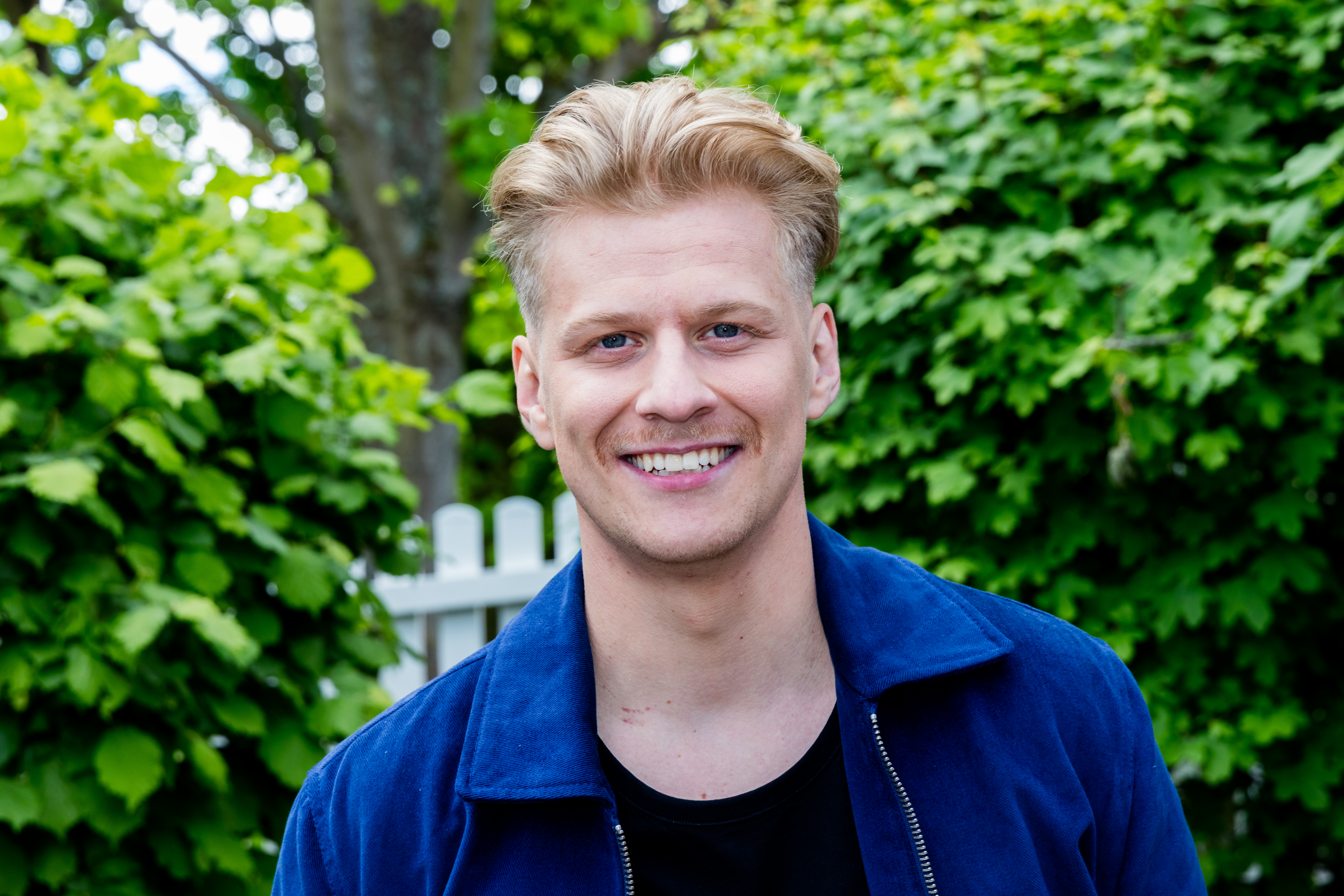
- Einarsson in 2025

Background information
- Birth name: Thorsteinn Ingi Einarsson
- Born: 19 March 1996 (age 29); Reykjavík, Iceland
- Origin: Salzburg, Austria
- Instrument: Vocals
- Years active: 2014–present
- Labels: Columbia

Thorsteinn Einarsson (born 19 March 1996 in Reykjavík, Iceland) is an Austrian–Icelandic musician who became known through the Austrian talent show Die große Chance.

== Biography ==
Einarsson was born to an Icelandic father and an Austrian mother. He moved to Salzburg for the first time at the age of five, where his father studied singing. After three years, his parents separated and he moved with his mother back to Reykjavík. At age eleven, he founded his first band. At 14, he moved back to Salzburg, where his father worked as an opera singer. After his education, he began a cookery apprenticeship. In 2014, he took part in the talent show Die große Chance where he placed fourth. At the 2015 Amadeus Awards he was awarded in the category Songwriter of the Year.

== Discography ==
=== Albums ===
Title	Details	Peak chart positions
Title	Details	AUT
1	Released: 22 April 2016; Label: Columbia; Format: Digital download, CD	6
IngI	Released: 24 May 2019; Label: Columbia; Format: Digital download, CD	4
Einarsson.	Released: 25 March 2022; Label: Columbia; Format: Digital download, CD	7
Teardrops & Confettiguns	Released: 21 March 2025; Label: Columbia; Format: Digital download, CD	2

=== Singles ===
Title	Year	Peak chart positions	Album
Title	Year	AUT	Album
"Aurora"	2014	26	1
"Leya"	2014	7	1
"Kryptonite"	2016	37	1
"Galaxy"	2018	—	Non-album singles
"Hotel Heartache"	2024	—	Non-album singles
