= Prezioso =

Prezioso is an Italian surname. Notable people with the surname include:

- Giovanni Prezioso (1957–2023), American lawyer
- Mario Prezioso (born 1996), Italian footballer
- Roman Prezioso (born 1949), American politician

== See also ==
- Prezioso & Marvin
