= Kim Lukas =

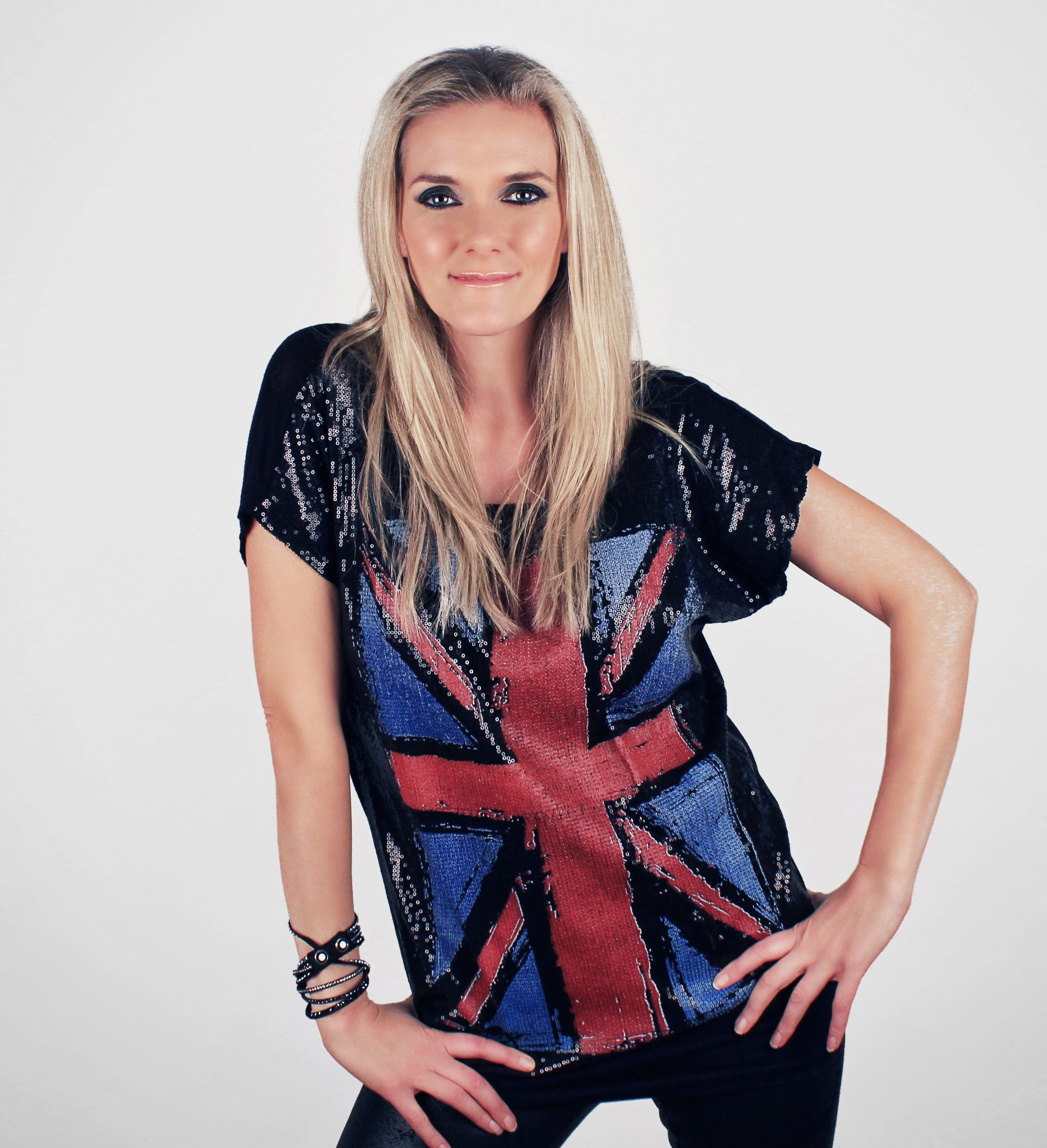
- Shown in 2015

Background information
- Born: Kim Joanne Woodcock Lukas; 16 March 1977 (age 49); Surrey, England
- Genres: Italo dance
- Occupation: Singer
- Years active: 1999–present

Kim Lukas (born Kim Joanne Woodcock Lukas; 16 March 1977) is an English pop singer, dancer and theatrical actress based in Italy, known for the song "All I Really Want" charting in several European countries.

== Early life ==
Lukas spent her first 13 years with her family in Surrey, England.

== Theatre ==
She had an early interest in art, and was involved in Drama Clubs for two years at the Morris Dancer. She studied for 2 years at a performing arts college, where she earned a BTEC Extended Diploma. She went on to study a further three years at Academy of Live and Recorded Arts in London. After some initial theatrical experience, she would interpret Puck in a production of A Midsummer Night's Dream by the English Shakespeare Company.

== Musical career ==
Lukas's father was very passionate about music and that would inspire her to listen to musical bands like The Beatles and artists such as Bob Dylan. She also loves pop music, and her favourite groups and artists were Duran Duran, Madonna and Five Star. The time she was 12 years old would be her first time performing in a television broadcast of the show Blue Peter, where she sang Hark the Herald Angels Sing.

Lukas met Dbone music through her producer, Roberto Turatti, in which her first single, "All I Really Want", would be sent to the company. Kim Lukas states on the lyrics of the song, "Most of my lyrics are based on general situations that people experience but also some of my own personal experiences." The song was a commercial success, reaching the top 10 in Austria, Canada, Denmark, and Italy, and Kim considered the success of the song to be "a dream at the time".

Lukas has also written lyrics for numerous dance acts including Sagei Rei, and Hard in Tango.

In 2002, Lukas presented on Gay TV's European Top 20.

In 1999, Lukas met with singer Nathalie, who would together often meet up at radio festivals for work. They were also with Neja as part of the project Girls Party. Producer Massimo Perini suggested a duet for the two as they both wanted to work together. The song was titled Change The World and it was released by Ritmica Records in 2007. Another collaboration with the two was titled Breathe Again and released by Inner Records on 12 July 2011.

Lukas continued to perform her shows in Italy and often in Spain, too.

== Personal life ==
Lukas has an interest in reading books, especially biographies, and attend concerts, festivals and various kinds of musical performances to buy a lot of music. She has an older brother, Luke, who currently lives in Málaga, Spain.

== Discography ==
=== Studio albums ===
- With a K (2000)

=== Singles ===
Year	Single	Peak chart positions										Album
Year	Single	IT (FIMI)	ITA (M&D)	AUS	AUT	BEL (Fl)	CAN	DEN	NLD	SWE	SWI	Album
1999	"All I Really Want"	—	8	62	9	26	2	3	17	17	50	With a K
2000	"Let It Be the Night"	—	18	55	28	— (Note: "Let It Be the Night" failed to enter any Ultratop 50 chart, but reached number 17 on the Flanders Ultratip chart, an extension of the Ultratop 50.)	—	—	—	54	99	With a K
2000	"To Be You"	38	22	—	—	—	—	—	—	—	—	With a K
2001	"Cloud 9"	—	—	—	—	—	—	—	—	—	—	With a K
2003	"Fiesta Fever" (Bonus Track)	—	—	—	—	—	—	—	—	—	—	With a K
2007	"Change the World"	—	—	—	—	—	—	—	—	—	—	
2011	"Breathe Again"	—	—	—	—	—	—	—	—	—	—	
"—" denotes releases that did not chart

== As featured artist ==
- 2011: "One More Day" with Simon de Jano
