= Italo dance =

Music genre

- Other names: Italodance
- Stylistic origins: Eurodance; Italo disco; Italo house
- Cultural origins: Mid-1990s, Italy
- Derivative forms: Lento violento

Italo dance (also written Italodance) is a genre of electronic dance music that originated in the mid-1990s in Italy as a regional development of eurodance; its sound subsequently evolved into a distinct yet closely related form.

The genre had its peak of popularity from the late 1990s to the mid-2000s, chiefly in Italy and San Marino, but it also enjoyed great success in the rest of Europe and in the Americas.

The genre's most successful acts include Eiffel 65, Gabry Ponte, Paps'n'Skar, Kim Lukas, Neja, Corona, Prezioso & Marvin and Gigi D'Agostino.

== Sound ==
=== Influences ===
The sound of the genre evolved directly from Eurodance. Italo dance displays a great influence from Italo disco, a genre which was very popular in Italy during the 1980s. Italo disco was a direct continuation of disco music (which would never experience a rejection wave in Italy), incorporating the new sounds that had begun to emerge from the late 1970s. Another main influence comes from Italo house, an Italian-based form of house music also influenced by Italo disco.

=== Characteristics ===
The sound of Italo dance usually tends to be positive and uplifting. Lyrics are mainly about love, partying, dancing and expressing feelings, and are generally sung in English or Italian.
The genre is characterized by the extensive use of synthesizers, piano-based melodies and simple, catchy choruses. Other typical elements are a 'metallic' bassline and the use of the four to the floor rhythmic pattern; vocals often employ vocoder and pitch correction.

== History ==
Through the 1990s, several dance artists from Italy enjoyed huge international success: amongst them Alexia, Black Box, Corona, DJ Dado, Gala, Robert Miles, the Tamperer featuring Maya, Double You and Whigfield. They became known outside Italy, in countries such as France, Spain, Germany, the United Kingdom and the United States. Albums like Best of Italo Dance Vol. 14 managed to make their way to the charts of some countries, as it happened in Sweden. In November 1994, WEA Italy launched the IDM (Italian Dance Machine) label, aiming to popularize Italo dance on a global scale.

In the meantime, from the mid-1990s, the sound of some artists began to evolve and become gradually distinct from "general" Eurodance; this new sonority broke through from the end of the decade.
During 1999, several Italo dance artists dominated the international music charts, in particular dance group Eiffel 65, but also Ann Lee, Gigi D'Agostino, Neja, Kim Lukas and Prezioso & Marvin.
Eiffel 65's first single, "Blue (Da Ba Dee)", was released in late 1998 and became an international hit in the following year, peaking at #1 on the music charts in several countries, including Italy, France, Germany, Austria, Belgium, the Netherlands, Australia and Canada. In the United States, the single reached #6 on the Billboard Hot 100, while the album Europop peaked at #4 on the Billboard 200. Amongst other successful singles from the album, "Too Much of Heaven" and "Move Your Body" (both 1999).
In summer 1999, Gigi D'Agostino released his hit single "Bla Bla Bla", mixing Italo house and Italo dance: the song reached #3 in Austria and #4 in Germany. In 2000, he repeated the success with his signature single "L'amour toujours".
Also in summer 1999, Italy-based English singer Kim Lukas released her hit single "All I Really Want": the song entered the top 10 in Italy, Canada (peaking at #2), Denmark and Austria. Prezioso & Marvin released their single "Tell Me Why", also entering the top 10 in various countries.

These successes paved the way for the new genre: in 2002, Eiffel 65 DJ Gabry Ponte started a parallele solo project, releasing hit singles such as "Geordie" (a remake of the eponymous song by Fabrizio De André, based on a traditional English ballad) in the same year, and "Figli di Pitagora" in 2004, featuring Sammarinese pop-rock legend Little Tony. In 2003, Eiffel 65 participated in the Sanremo Festival with the song "Quelli che non hanno età"; they also released successful singles in the Italo dance style, such as "Viaggia insieme a me" (2003). In 2005, group Paps'n'Skar released their best-known song, "Vieni con me".
Since the beginning of the new millennium, other artists began to release new material inspired in the Italo dance sound, even outside Italy: as an example, German group ItaloBrothers can be quoted.

After the mid-2000s, however, Italo dance's popularity began to decrease, as other genres were rising to prominence: amongst these, the electro house pioneered by Italian DJ Benny Benassi with his 2002 single "Satisfaction", and the music of EDM producers like Bob Sinclar and David Guetta.

Nowadays, Italo dance is still cultivated by fans, and songs in the genre are sometimes aired by radios all over the world. The genre is also usually present in retrospective music festivals, such as Arena Suzuki (Arena di Verona, Italy).

In 2022, the genre experienced a revival thanks to Dargen D'Amico's hit "Dove si balla", heavily inspired in Italo dance sound and atmospheres.

== Bibliography ==
- James Arena, Stars of 21st Century Dance Pop and EDM : 33 DJs, Producers and Singers Discuss Their Careers, McFarland & Company, 2017 ISBN 978-1-4766-2894-3, online preview at Google Books
- Riccardo Sada, EDM, E Dio Mixa: Guida polifonica all'Electronic Dance Music, Nobook, 2017 ISBN 978-88-98591-30-5, online preview at Google Books (in Italian)
- Andrew Whittaker, Italy: Be Fluent in Italian Life and Culture, Thorogood Publishing, 2010 ISBN 978-1-85418-628-7, online preview at Google Books
