= Tacabro =

Italian dance music trio

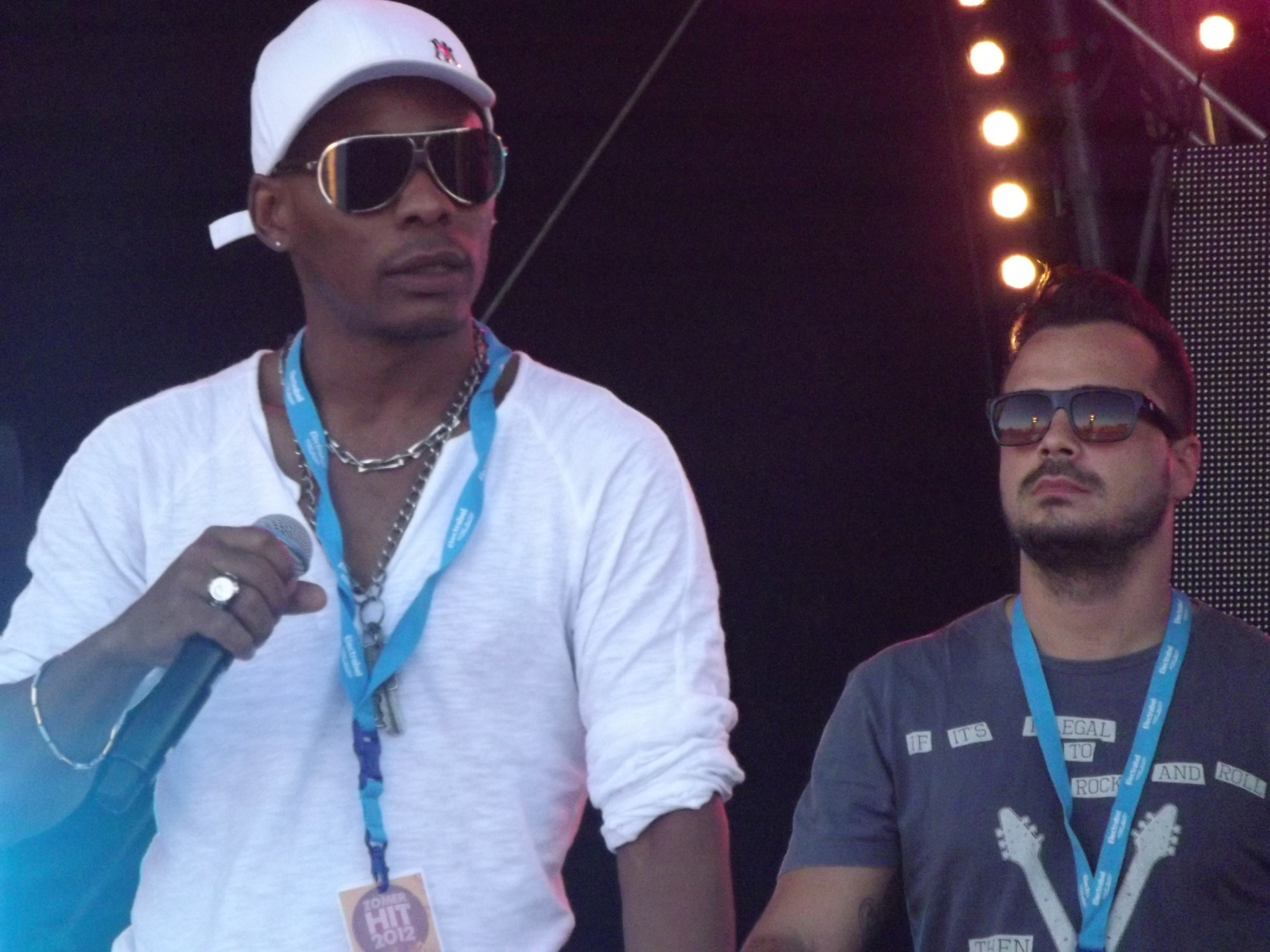
- Ruly MC and Mario Romano in 2012

Background information
- Origin: Catania, Sicily, Italy
- Genres: Electro-pop; tribal
- Years active: 2008–present
- Label: Hollister Records
- Members: Mario Romano; Salvatore "Salvo" Sapienza
- Past members: Ruly MC
- Website: tacabro.com

Tacabro is an Italian dance music trio from Catania, Sicily, initially made up of Italian DJs and record producers Mario Romano (born 28 November 1984) and Salvatore "Salvo" Sapienza (born 21 February 1986), and later also of Cuban singer Martínez Rodríguez (born 27 March 1978) – better known as Ruly MC.

Mario Romano and Salvo Sapienza started working in Italian nightclubs as DJs, and in the spring of 2008 they formed the duo known as Romano & Sapienza, playing mostly electro/tribal sounds. Their first break as Romano & Sapienza was with their first single "Judas Brass", released that year for "Hollister Records".

However they are best known for the hit "Tacata'", released in 2011 in Italy and credited to "Romano & Sapienza featuring Rodríguez", the latter being the aforementioned Ruly MC. Based on this success, the single was released the next year with a new music video under the name "Tacabro", becoming a hit in Denmark where it reached #1, in France where it reached #6, and in Sweden.

According to PROMUSICAE, the publisher of the Official Spanish Singles and Albums Charts, "Rayos de Sol" was the seventh biggest selling single in Spain in 2012.

In 2015, Mario Romano collaborated with American singer-songwriter Liza Fox and DJ "Jus Grata" on the single "Unlimited".

== Discography ==
=== Singles ===
List of singles, with selected chart positions
Year	Title	Peak chart positions													Certifications	Album
Year	Title	ITA	AUT	BEL Vl	BEL Wa	DEN	FIN	FRA	GER	NED	NOR	SPA	SWE	SWI	Certifications	Album
2008	"Judas Brass" (Romano & Sapienza)	—	—	—	—	—	—	—	—	—	—	—	—	—		Singles only
2011	"Mujeres" (Romano & Sapienza feat. Ruly MC)	—	—	—	—	—	—	—	—	—	—	—	—	—		Singles only
2011	"I Like Reggaeton" (Romano & Sapienza feat. Ruly MC)	—	—	—	—	—	—	—	—	—	—	—	—	—		Singles only
2011 / 2012	"Tacata'" (Romano & Sapienza feat. Rodríguez)	4	—	—	—	—	—	—	—	—	—	—	—	67		Singles only
2012	"Tacata'" (Tacabro)	—	1	5	5	1	2	1	4	3	4	1	14	1	BEL: Gold; DEN: Gold; GER: Gold; ITA: 2× Platinum; SPA: Gold; SWE: Platinum; SUI: Platinum	Singles only
2012	"Asi Asi" (Tacabro)	—	—	—	—	—	—	—	—	—	—	—	—	—		Singles only
2013	"Tic Tic Tac" (Tacabro feat. Prado Grau vs Orchestra Bagutti)	—	—	—	—	—	—	—	—	—	—	—	—	—		Singles only
2014	"I Love Girls" (Tacabro vs. DJ Matrix feat. Kenny Ray)	—	—	—	—	—	—	—	—	—	—	—	—	—		Singles only
