= All I Really Want (Kim Lukas song) =

1999 single by Kim Lukas

Single by Kim Lukas

from the album With a K
- Released: 15 June 1999
- Genre: Italo dance
- Length: 3:45
- Label: Jive
- Songwriters: Roberto Turatti; Silvio Melloni; G. Boretti; K. Woodcock; G. Zandonà
- Producers: Roberto Turatti; Silvio Melloni; G. Zandonà

Kim Lukas singles chronology
"All I Really Want" (1999)	"Let It Be the Night" (2000)

Music video
- "All I Really Want" on YouTube

"All I Really Want" is a song by English Italy-based singer Kim Lukas. The song was released in June 1999 as the lead single from Lukas's debut album, With a K. The song reached the top 10 in Austria, Canada, Denmark, and Italy.

== Background ==
"All I Really Want" is an Italo dance song played in 128.4 beats per measure and in an E minor key. Lukas had the song sent to Dbone music through her producer, Roberto Turatti. Kim Lukas states on the lyrics of the song, "Most of my lyrics are based on general situations that people experience but also some of my own personal experiences". Kim also said she was incredible with the song's chart performance: "It seemed like a dream at the time." The song's music video was made by BlissCo Media and released by BMG and Jive.

== Track listings ==
CD maxi – Europe (1999)

1. "All I Really Want" (Eiffel 65 radio edit) – 3:45
2. "All I Really Want" (Shaft Club radio edit) – 3:25
3. "All I Really Want" (Shaft Club) – 4:58
4. "All I Really Want" (original mix) – 5:08
5. "All I Really Want" (Eiffel 65 remix) – 5:31
6. "All I Really Want" (Shaft Club mix) – 4:45

== Charts ==
=== Weekly charts ===
Weekly chart performance for "All I Really Want"
Chart (1999–2000)	Peak position
Australia (ARIA)	62
Austria (Ö3 Austria Top 40)	9
Belgium (Ultratop 50 Flanders)	26
Canada Top Singles (RPM)	4
Canada Dance/Urban (RPM)	2
Denmark (IFPI)	3
Europe (Eurochart Hot 100)	45
France (SNEP)	34
Iceland (Íslenski Listinn Topp 40)	34
Italy (Musica e dischi)	8
Italy Airplay (Music & Media)	5
Netherlands (Dutch Top 40)	17
Netherlands (Single Top 100)	21
Norway (VG-lista)	16
Spain (Promusicae)	18
Sweden (Sverigetopplistan)	17
Switzerland (Schweizer Hitparade)	50

=== Year-end charts ===
1999 year-end chart performance for "All I Really Want"
Chart (1999)	Position
Netherlands (Dutch Top 40)	153

2000 year-end chart performance for "All I Really Want"
Chart (2000)	Position
Netherlands (Dutch Top 40)	125
