= Cuthbert Fairbanks-Smith =

English cricketer

Personal information
- Full name: Cuthbert Fairbanks-Smith
- Born: 18 March 1885; Lee, London, England
- Died: 25 May 1948 (aged 63); Middleton, Sussex, England

Domestic team information
- Years: Team
- 1921: Somerset

Career statistics
Competition	FC
Matches	2
Runs scored	6
Batting average	3.00
100s/50s	0/0
Top score	6
Catches/stumpings	1/–
- Source: CricketArchive, 22 December 2015

Cuthbert Fairbanks-Smith (18 March 1885 – 25 May 1948) played first-class cricket for Somerset in two matches in 1921. He was born at Lee, London and died at Middleton-on-Sea, Sussex.

In his two cricket appearances, Fairbanks-Smith was identified as "Major Fairbanks-Smith" and by 1921 he had been an army officer for 18 years. He joined a Militia battalion of the Royal Berkshire Regiment in January 1903 as a second lieutenant. The following year, 1904, he transferred to full-time employment with the regular army as a second lieutenant in the Middlesex Regiment, and in 1906 he was promoted to full lieutenant. In 1909 it was reported in the London Gazette that he had been seconded, but there are no details of where. By 1915, when he next appears in the Gazette listings, he was being transferred from Princess Patricia's Canadian Light Infantry to the Durham Light Infantry with the rank of major.

Fairbanks-Smith's cricket career was brief and undistinguished. Somerset played the two university sides, first Oxford and then Cambridge in consecutive matches in a single week in mid-May. According to Wisden Cricketers' Almanack, Somerset started the week at Oxford in some disarray: "Somerset were in such a plight that they had to complete their side by including four Oxford men," it said. Three of the four were certainly Kenneth Blaikie, Louis Wharton and John Frazer – the first two went on to play other matches for Somerset, but Frazer's county cricket was otherwise for Sussex. It is not clear who the fourth was, but as all the other players in the Oxford match had played before for Somerset, Wisden could have meant Fairbanks-Smith. Either way, he batted at No 10, made 0 and 6, took one catch and did not bowl. Alone of the four Oxford conscripts, Fairbanks-Smith accompanied the Somerset side on to Cambridge, where he was 0 not out at the end of the Somerset first innings and then "absent" in the second innings. He did not appear in first-class cricket afterwards.
