= Pia Maria =

Austrian singer (born 2003)

Pia Maria Außerlechner
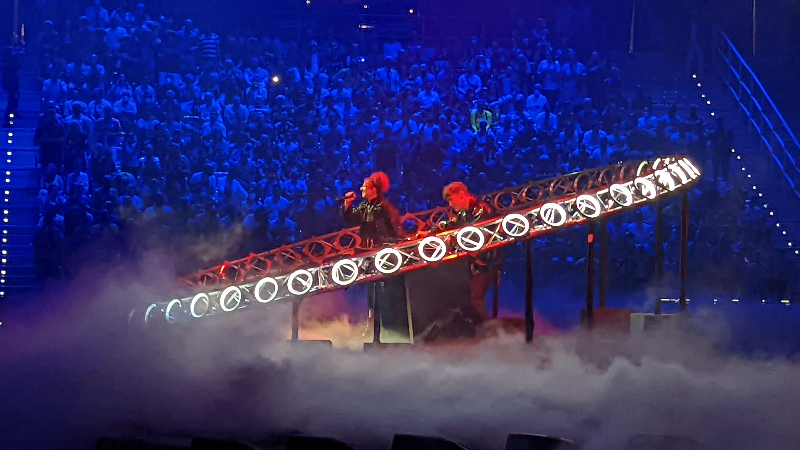
- Pia Maria (left) at the Eurovision Song Contest 2022

Background information
- Born: 21 May 2003 (age 23); Tyrol, Austria
- Occupation: Singer
- Instruments: Vocals

Pia Maria Außerlechner (born 21 May 2003), who performs as Pia Maria, is an Austrian singer. She represented Austria at the Eurovision Song Contest 2022 alongside DJ Lumix.

== Early life ==
Pia Maria is from the Austrian region of Tyrol. She is a trained make-up artist and works at the Tyrolean State Theatre in Innsbruck. She has been writing her own songs since she was 16.

== Career ==
Pia Maria represented Austria at the Eurovision Song Contest 2022 in Turin, Italy, performing the song "Halo" by DJ Lumix.

During the promotional pre-parties for Eurovision, Pia Maria received criticism for vocal issues during the live performances of "Halo". It was later confirmed that her vocal struggles were due to long COVID, as well as the vocalist's inexperience with in-ear monitors. The Austrian delegation hired a vocal coach to work with Pia Maria to prepare for the contest, and the backing track for "Halo" was transposed into a lower key for future pre-parties.

== Discography ==
=== Singles ===
List of singles as lead artist, with selected chart positions
Title	Year	Peak chart positions		Certifications	Album or EP
Title	Year	AUT	LTU	Certifications	Album or EP
"Halo" (with LUM!X)	2022	6	68	IFPI AUT: Gold	Non-album singles
"I Know U Know"	2022	—	—		Non-album singles
"White Noise"	2022	—	—		Non-album singles
"Love Is a Circus"	2023	—	—		Non-album singles
"Reckless Heart"	2023	—	—		Non-album singles
"Mess With Me"	2024	—	—		Non-album singles
"Locked Feelings"	2024	—	—		Non-album singles
"—" denotes a single that did not chart or was not released.

== Awards and nominations ==
Year	Award	Category	Work	Result
2023	Amadeus Austrian Music Awards	Song of the Year	"Halo"	Won
2023	Amadeus Austrian Music Awards	Electronic / Dance	"Halo"	Won

Preceded by Vincent Bueno with "Amen"	Austria in the Eurovision Song Contest (with Lumix); 2022	Succeeded by Teya and Salena with "Who the Hell Is Edgar?"
