= Amadeus Austrian Music Awards =

Austrian music awards show

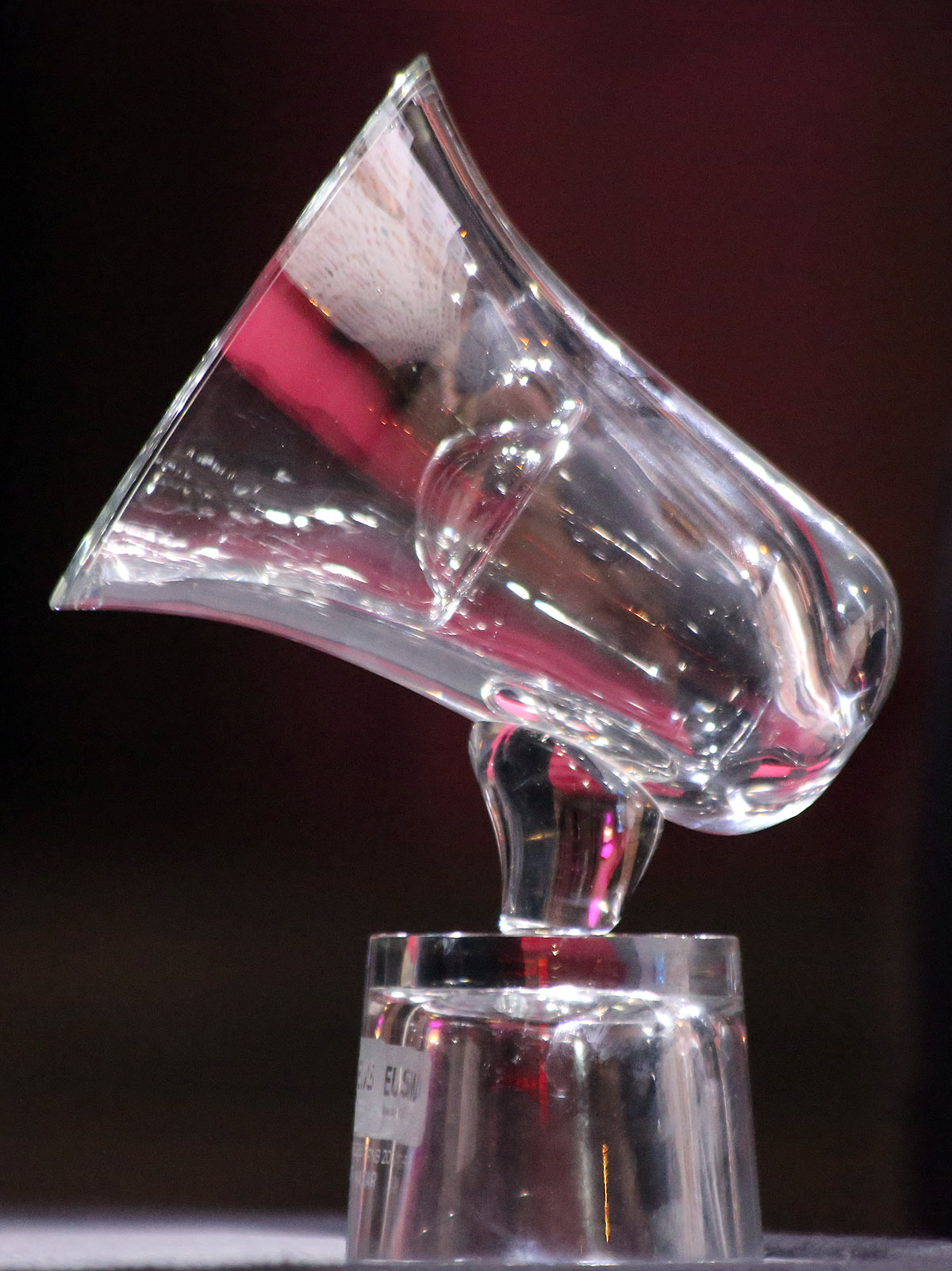
- Awarded for: Outstanding achievements in the Austrian music industry
- Country: Austria
- Presented by: IFPI Austria
- First award: 2000; 26 years ago
- Website: aama.at

Television/radio coverage
- Network: ORF (2000–2007, 2017–present); Puls 4 and ProSiebenSat.1 Media (2008–2014); ATV (2015–2016)

The Amadeus Austrian Music Awards is the annual awards ceremony for excellence in the Austrian music industry. It has been awarded to the most successful Austrian musicians since 2000, and has been held in the Volkstheater in Vienna each March since 2012. It is the Austrian equivalent to the Grammys.

== History ==
The awards ceremony was founded by IFPI Austria in 2000, and was broadcast by the Austrian national broadcaster Österreichischer Rundfunk (ORF). Andi Knoll hosted the show. In 2008, the broadcasters Puls 4 and ProSiebenSat.1 Media began hosting the ceremony together. Michael Ostrowski hosted the show from 2008 until 2010, and Manuel Rubey began hosting in 2012. Since 2012, the ceremony has been held in Volkstheater, after previously being held in Gasometer B, Kunsthalle Wien, and Wiener Stadthalle. The 2011 ceremony was canceled and later rescheduled as the 2012 event.

== Awards ==
Awards can be awarded to any musician with Austrian citizenship or who have established their career in Austria. As of 2023, there are 14 categories.

=== General ===
- Album of the Year
- Song of the Year
- Live Act of the Year
- Songwriter of the Year
- FM4 Award
- Lifetime Achievement
- Best Sound

=== Genre ===
- Alternative
- Hard & Heavy
- HipHop / Urban
- Jazz / World / Blues
- Electronic / Dance
- Pop / Rock
- Schlager / Folk music
