= Prezioso & Marvin =

Italian musical group

Prezioso & Marvin (Prezioso feat. Marvin)
- Origin: Rome, Italy
- Genres: Italo dance
- Years active: 1993–1999: Prezioso; 1999–present
- Members: Andrea Prezioso; Giorgio Prezioso; Alessandro Moschini (as Marvin)

Prezioso & Marvin is an Italo dance trio group founded in 1999 and made up of brothers Andrea and Giorgio Prezioso (known as Prezioso) in addition to Alessandro Moschini, known as Marvin. Prior to 1999, and starting from 1993, the brothers Andrea and Giorgio Prezioso were known as the duo Prezioso [pretˈtsjoːzo]. With Giorgio Prezioso taking a hiatus in 2007 to move to his own project Giorgio Prezioso & Libex (with DJ Libex), Prezioso & Marvin became a duo. But Giorgio returned to the formation in 2009.

Both albums Back to Life (2000) and We Rule the Danza (2002) as well as earlier hits from 1999 to 2003 (including "Tell Me Why", "Rock the Discothek", "Emergency 911", "Let's Talk About a Man" and "Voglio Vederti Danzare") were all credited to Prezioso featuring Marvin. But from 2004, the name was changed to Prezioso & Marvin. G. Maiolini was the record producer of the group. They were signed to Bang Records with hit singles in countries including Italy, Spain, the United Kingdom and Germany.The duo's 2000 song "Emergency 911", a remix of Gloria Estefan's 1984 song "Dr. Beat" went viral on social media in 2024, becoming popular on video-sharing platforms like TikTok and Instagram and was remixed again by Dj Johnrey as "Emergency Budots" in 2024, this time going viral as a dance trend.

The brothers have also released records as solo artists and as part of other ensembles and in various collaborations.

== Members ==
=== Andrea Prezioso ===
Andrea Prezioso (born 31 October 1967) is a keyboard player in the trio.

In addition, he was part of the musical projects Game Boys, a duo with Eugenio Passalacqua (1991–1993), collaborated with the Dutch Electronic/Techno act Trauma. In 1991–1992, Andrea Prezioso and David Calzamatta formed the Precious X Project. Andrea Prezioso also collaborated in 1992 with Eugenio Passalacqua and Alessandro Moschini as Illegal. In 1993, he formed a short living duo with Eugenio Passalacqua as P.D.P. In 1993–1994, with Giorgio Prezioso and Eugenio Passalacqua was part of Corporation of Three. In 1996, Andrea Prezioso collaborated with Eugenio Passalacqua and Alessandro Moschini under the projects K.S. and Omega and Ramset.

In 1998, Andrea Prezioso, Giorgio Prezioso and Alessandro Moschini recorded as the act Stop Talking. In 2000, he was part of the project Quik with Alessandro Moschini, Giorgio Prezioso and Ricky Romanini.

Since 2012, he has been in the formation Re-Tide, an Italian project that revisits the underground music scene of the early 1970s and 1980s for the club music lovers. Re-Tide is a trio that also includes Danny Omich and Patrizio Mattei.

=== Giorgio Prezioso ===
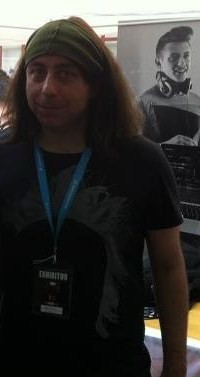
Giorgio Prezioso in 2012

Giorgio Prezioso (born 23 February 1971) is the DJ of the band. At various times, he has used the Precious George and the mononym Prezioso.

His musical career began in 1987 at the age of 16, helped by his brother Andrea, about 4 years older and with whom he had produced various experimental pieces. He collaborated with Jovanotti at the Veleno disco club in Rome. In 1991, after winning the Walky Cup (a DJ competition).

In 1993–1994, Giorgio Prezioso was part of what was known as Corporation of Three with his brother Andrea Prezioso and with Eugenio Passalacqua, the latter he had collaborated with from 1991 to 1993 under the act Game Boys. In 2000, he was part of the project Quik with Alessandro Moschini, Andrea Prezioso and Ricky Romanini.

In 1996, Giorgio Prezioso collaborated with Federico Franchi and Mario Di Giacomo in an Italian Hard Trance project as The Alternative Creators.

In 1998, Giorgio Prezioso, Andrea Prezioso and Alessandro Moschini recorded as the act Stop Talking. In 1998, he was also in a duo act with Mauro Picotto under the name Tom Cat.

In 2006, Giorgio Prezioso took a hiatus from the band to work with Libero Bovolenta (known as DJ Libex). Tracks were released under Net's Work International. The collaboration was named Giorgio Prezioso & Libex. Giorgio Prezioso continues as a solo act.

Giorgio Prezioso is also famous for his radio work since 1996. His participation as a technician and co-host with Mario Fargetta of the two flagship programs of the afternoon time slot of Radio Deejay, with the projects The Deejay Time and the Deejay Parade, led by Albertino, again for Radio DeeJay curating and remixing the various compilations together with Mario Fargetta. Since 2007 he has been conducting also the m2o radio the programme Prezioso in Action and on Radio DeeJay the show Disco Ball. During 2008 he collaborated on the television program "Blister - Pillole dal web" broadcast on All Music television channel.

In 2014, a new project was launched by EDM DJ and producer Antonino Angemi with Giorgio Prezioso. The act, called Angemi & Prezioso, has included collaborations with Mike Candys and Tom Ferro. The act is signed with Revealed Recordings, which also includes the Dutch DJ Hardwell. The single Giorgio Prezioso also continues as a solo act.

=== Alessandro Moschini ===
Alessandro Moschini (born 2 August 1972) known by the alias Marvin in tribute to the renowned American boxer Marvelous Marvin Hagler.

He is the lead singer since 1999. In 1996, Alessandro Moschini had already collaborated with Andrea Prezioso and Eugenio Passalacqua under the projects K.S. and Omega and Ramset. In 1998, he recorded with Andrea Prezioso and Giorgio Prezioso as the act Stop Talking and in 2000, in the short-lived music project Quik with Andrea and Giorgio Prezioso and with Ricky Romanini. In 2004 to 2006, the same trio returned as 84 King Street and in 2008 the trio recorded as Noize Freakz.

== Associated acts ==
Besides the main act, various members have been involved in a number of short-lasting musical projects. Of those we can mention:

=== Game Boys ===
In his early days in 1991–1993, Andrea Prezioso formed a group with Eugenio Passalacqua and David Calzamatta under the name Game Boys with various track releases like:

- 1992: "Tetris"
- 1993: "Phantom"
- 1993: "Move"

=== Precious X Project ===
In 1991–1992, Andrea Prezioso and David Calzamatta formed the acid techno electronic project Precious X Project.

- 1991: A New Kind Of Sound Generated From Our Nevrotic Mind Vol. 1
- 1992: "Dukkha"

=== Illegal ===
In 1992, Andrea Prezioso and Eugenio Passalacqua collaborated with Alessandro Moschini in the project Illegal, releasing the album In The Name of the Law.

- 1992: In The Name of the Law (studio album)
- 1996: "Moments in Love" (cover of song originally by the Art of Noise)

=== Corporation of Three ===
In 1993–1994, Andrea Prezioso, Giorgio Prezioso and Eugenio Passalacqua launched yet another project they named Corporation of Three releasing two tracks:

- 1993: "The Bear"
- 1994: "Body Strong"

=== P.D.P. ===
Also in 1993, Andrea Prezioso and Eugenio Passalacqua recorded under a duo named P.D.P.

- 1993: "Try Jah Love" (credited to P.D.P. featuring Tony Esposito & Glenn White

=== K.S. ===
In 1996, Andrea Prezioso, Eugenio Passalacqua and Alessandro Moschini collaborated under the music project K.S. The trio had two releases:

- 1993: "Phaedra/Jim Is Back"
- 1996: "The Spice Must Flow/Fellini's Circus" (Note: Fellini's Circus is a Progressive trance remix of Ithaka Darin Pappas's 1992 song So Get Up

=== Omega ===
In 1996, Andrea Prezioso, Alessandro Moschini and Eugenio Passalacqua recorded also under the name Omega releasing:

- 1996: Omega EP (with tracks "Genesi"/"Charlie")

=== Ramset ===
In 1996, Andrea Prezioso, Alessandro Moschini and Eugenio Passalacqua also recorded under the name Ramset.

- 1996: "Spirits"

=== The Alternative Creators ===
In 1996, Giorgio Prezioso collaborated with Federico Franchi and Mario Di Giacomo in an Italian Hard Trance project as The Alternative Creators.

- 1996: Sound Creation EP
- 1996: The Beats EP
- 1998: "Rave Invention" (as Alternative Creators III)

=== It's Deejay Time ===
It's Deejay Time was an Italian musical project started by Albertino and his radio crew, based on the starting theme of his radio programme "DeeJay Time" on Radio DeeJay. It's Deejay Time consisted of Alberto Di Molfetta, Fargetta, Giorgio Prezioso and Maurizio Molella. Twenty years later, in 2016, the project Deejay Time was reactivated for remixes of dance hits of 1990s.

- 1996: It's Deejay Time EP
- 2016: "Uh La La La" (credited to Deejay Time & Alexia)
- 2016: "The Real Thing" (credited to Deejay Time & Tony Di Bart)

=== Stop Talking ===
In 1998, Andrea Prezioso, Giorgio Prezioso and Alessandro Moschini recorded as the act Stop Talking.

- 1998: "Burning Like Fire" / "The Pinzel"

=== Tom Cat ===
In 1998, Giorgio Prezioso collaborated with Mauro Picotto recording as Tom Cat.

- 1998: "Hardcat"

=== Quik ===
In 2000, there was a short-lived music project Quik made up of Andrea Prezioso, Giorgio Prezioso, Alessandro Moschini and Ricky Romanini.

- 2000: "Need You Tonite (La La La)" (featuring Charlotte)

=== 84 King Street ===
In the period 2004–2006, Andrea Prezioso, Giorgio Prezioso and Alessandro Moschini launched yet another Italian electro house project called 84 King Street. Releases included:

- 2004: So Many Men, So Little Time
- 2006: Are You Lovin' Somebody

=== Giorgio Prezioso & Libex ===
In 2006, Giorgio Prezioso took a hiatus from the band to work with Libero Bovolenta (known as Libex). Tracks were released under Net's Work International. The collaboration was named Giorgio Prezioso & Libex, and continued until 2009. Releases Giorgio Prezioso & Libex included:

- 2006: "Xperimental Scratch"
- 2006: "Pongo"
- 2007: "Intelligence"
- 2008: "Apista"
- 2008: "Uniz"
- 2009: "Get Up"
- 2009: "Apista (Remix)"

=== Noize Freakz ===
In 2008, Alessandro Moschini, Andrea Prezioso and Giorgio Prezioso also recorded as Noize Freakz. Releases included:

- 2008: "Believe"

=== Re-Tide ===
Since 2012, Andrea Prezioso has been in the formation Re-Tide, an Italian project that revisits the underground music scene of the early 1970s and 1980s for the club music lovers. Re-Tide is a trio that also includes Danny Omich and Patrizio Mattei. Releases include:

- 2012: Menergy EP
- 2012: "Luther"/"Sylvia"
- 2013: "Social Narcotics"
- 2013: "From The Block"
- 2016: "The Big Question"

=== Angemi & Prezioso ===
In 2014, a new project was launched by Italian EDM DJ and producer Antonino Angemi and Giorgio Prezioso. The act, called Angemi & Prezioso, has included collaborations with Mike Candys and Tom Ferro.

- 2014: "Brakeless"
- 2014: "Dragon"
- 2015: "Sextape" (credited to Mike Candys vs Angemi & Prezioso)
- 2015: "Friendzone" (credited to Tom Ferro vs. Angemi & Prezioso)
- 2015: "Wet"

== Discography: Prezioso ==
=== Albums ===
- 2001: Back to Life

=== Singles and EPs ===
- 1993: "Get On Up"
- 1994: "Anybody, Anyway" (feat. Daphnes)
- 1995: "Don't Stop"
- 1995: "Feel the Rhythm"
- 1997: "Raise Your Power"
- 1997: Megamix EP (credited to Prezioso vs. N-Trance)
- 1998: "I Wanna Rock"

== Discography: Prezioso & Marvin ==
=== Albums ===
(credited as Prezioso featuring Marvin)

Year	Album	Peak chart positions			
Year	Album	AUT	GER	ITA	SUI
2000	Back to Life	34	98		53
2002	We Rule the Danza	52	–		–

Compilation album

- 2003: Voglio Vederti Danzare (2 CDs)

=== EPs ===
- 2000: Emergency E.P.
- 2001: Bonjour
- 2009: The Riddle

==== Singles ====
Year	Single	Peak chart positions					Album
Year	Single	AUT	FRA	GER	ITA	SUI	Album
Credited as Prezioso featuring Marvin
1999	"Tell Me Why"	2	53	10	9	9	Back to Life
2000	"Voices"	34	—	81	—	—	Back to Life
2000	"Let Me Stay"	10	—	32	21	32	Back to Life
2001	"Rock the Discothek"	7	—	29	—	—	Back to Life
2001	"Emergency 911"	5	—	70	20	—	Back to Life
2001	"Let's Talk About a Man"	14	—	30	29	—	We Rule the Danza
2002	"Somebody"	43	—	55	—	—	We Rule the Danza
2002	"We Rule the Danza"	—	—	—	21	—	We Rule the Danza
2002	"In My Mind"	—	—	—	28	—	We Rule the Danza
2002	"Bonjour"	31	—	—	31	—	We Rule the Danza
2003	"Voglio Vederti Danzare"	32	—	94	6	—	Voglio Vederti Danzare
Credited as Prezioso & Marvin
2004	"Le Louvre"	—	—	—	10	—	Singles only
2005	"Rockin' Deejays"	—	—	—	43	—	Singles only
2006	"Survival"	—	—	—	—	—	Singles only
2007	"Touch Me"	—	—	—	—	—	Singles only
2009	"I Believe"	—	—	—	—	—	Singles only
2009	"Happy Flight"	—	—	—	—	—	Singles only
2009	"The Riddle"	—	—	—	—	—	Singles only
2011	"Alone"	—	—	—	—	—	Singles only
"—" denotes releases that did not chart

== Discography: Various productions and collaborations ==
1987

- Andrea & Giorgio Prezioso - Gino Latino - "Bootleg"

1988

- Andrea & Giorgio Prezioso - Much More Posse - "Hip Style Melody"

1991

- Andrea Prezioso - GPA - "I'm Gonna Win"
- Andrea Prezioso - Stressness - "Adrenalin"

1992

- Andrea & Giorgio Prezioso - Interactive - "Elevator Up And Down (Prezioso Remix)"
- Andrea Prezioso - Quark

1993

- Andrea & Giorgio Prezioso - 883 - "Come Mai (Prezioso Remix)"
- Andrea & Giorgio Prezioso - Turin Terminators - "The New (Precious Mix)"

1995

- Andrea Prezioso & Marvin - Format - "Take A Ride in the Sky"

1996

- Andrea Prezioso, Giorgio Prezioso & Marvin - 808 State - "Pacific"
- Andrea Prezioso & Marvin - Ike Therry - "C'est La Ouate"
- Andrea Prezioso & Marvin - J Smooth - "Promised Land" (Team In Town Remix)
- Andrea Prezioso & Marvin - J Smooth - "Fall Into a Trance" (Team In Town Remix)

1998

- Andrea Prezioso - Max'N'Precious - "My One Temptation"

2011

- Giorgio Prezioso & Marvin - Jovanotti - "Tutto l'amore che ho" (Giorgio Prezioso & Marvin Remix)
