= Austria in the Eurovision Song Contest =

- Eurovision Song Contest
- Participating broadcaster: Österreichischer Rundfunk (ORF)

Participation summary
- Appearances: 58 (51 finals)
- First appearance: 1957
- Highest placement: 1st: 1966, 2014, 2025
- Host: 1967, 2015, 2026
- Participation history: 1957; 1958; 1959; 1960; 1961; 1962; 1963; 1964; 1965; 1966; 1967; 1968; 1969; 1970; 1971; 1972; 1973; 1974; 1975; 1976; 1977; 1978; 1979; 1980; 1981; 1982; 1983; 1984; 1985; 1986; 1987; 1988; 1989; 1990; 1991; 1992; 1993; 1994; 1995; 1996; 1997; 1998; 1999; 2000; 2001; 2002; 2003; 2004; 2005; 2006; 2007; 2008; 2009; 2010; 2011; 2012; 2013; 2014; 2015; 2016; 2017; 2018; 2019; ~~2020~~; 2021; 2022; 2023; 2024; 2025; 2026

External links
- ORF official homepage
- Austria's page at Eurovision.com
- For the most recent participation see Austria in the Eurovision Song Contest 2026

Austria has been represented at the Eurovision Song Contest 58 times since its debut in 1957. The country has won three times, in 1966, 2014 and 2025. The Austrian participating broadcaster in the contest is Österreichischer Rundfunk (ORF). Vienna was the host city on all three occasions the contest has been held in Austria, in 1967, 2015, and 2026.

Austria has finished last in the contest final seven times (1957, 1961, 1962, 1979, 1984, 1988, and 1991) and finished last in the semi-final in 2012. "Nobody but You" by Cesár Sampson achieved Austria's eighth top five result and third-best result of the 21st century at the 2018 contest, finishing third.

Having finished sixth at the 1964 contest and fourth in 1965, Udo Jürgens, one of few Eurovision performers to have competed in three consecutive contests, won at his third attempt in 1966 with the song "Merci, Chérie". This was Austria's only top three result of the 20th century, as well as its first win. Austria won for a second time in 2014, with "Rise Like a Phoenix" by Conchita Wurst, setting a then-record for longest gap between winning entries at 48 years. The country would go on to win most recently in 2025, with "Wasted Love" by JJ.

== Participation ==
Österreichischer Rundfunk (ORF) is a full member of the European Broadcasting Union (EBU), thus eligible to participate in the Eurovision Song Contest representing Austria.

== History ==
ORF finished last at its debut in the contest in 1957, before Liane Augustin gave the country the first of its eight top five results in 1958, with fifth. Having finished sixth in 1964 and fourth in 1965, Udo Jürgens won the contest at his third attempt in 1966. This would be Austria's only top three result of 20th century. The country's best result over the next 46 years (1967–2013) would be fifth place, which it achieved with The Milestones in 1972, Waterloo and Robinson in 1976 and Thomas Forstner in 1989. Austria has finished last in the final a total of seven times, in 1957, 1961, 1962, 1979, 1984, 1988, 1991. The country also finished last in the semi-final in 2012. Austria's best result of the 1990s was four tenth-place finishes, in 1990, 1992, 1996 and 1999. Austria's best result of the 2000s was Alf Poier's sixth-place in 2003, which was Austria's best placement since 1989.

After a three-year absence, ORF announced on 28 July 2010 that Austria would return to the contest in 2011, where the country reached the final for the first time since 2004, finishing 18th.

Austria achieved its second victory in the contest at the 2014 contest, with Conchita Wurst winning with 290 points. In a complete reversal of fortunes in 2015, following a tie-break rule Austria was placed 26th and scored nul points along with Germany (27th), it became the first country since the United Kingdom in 2003 to score no points at the final. Because of this, Austria became the first host country to receive nul points. Austria qualified for the final for the next three years, finishing 13th in 2016, 16th in 2017, and in 2018, when "Nobody but You" by Cesár Sampson finished third. Three more non-qualifications followed in 2019, 2021, and 2022. Teya and Salena returned Austria to the final in 2023, finishing 15th, followed by Kaleen finishing 24th in 2024, before JJ achieved Austria's third contest win in 2025.

== Absences ==
Austria has opted out of participation in several contests. The first of these was the 1969 contest, which was staged in Madrid. As Spain was ruled at that time by Francisco Franco, Austria chose to boycott the contest.

The following year, Austria was again absent. This was due to the unprecedented result in 1969 in which four songs tied for first place, a result which prompted several other countries to opt out as well.

From 1973 to 1975, Austria stayed away as well. The exact reason for this is unclear, however the scoring system in use at one of these contests, which allowed all entrants a guaranteed number of points, may have been a factor.

The country was ineligible to compete in 1998 and 2001, as it had not achieved sufficiently high placings in the five previous years.

Prior to the 2006 contest, Austria announced that it would not enter a performer in protest at their poor results in previous years, arguing that the musical talent of the performers was no longer the determining factor in success at the event. The country returned for the 2007 contest in Helsinki, but came second to last in the semi-final. National broadcaster ORF cited the 2007 result, as well as declining interest in the contest among Austrian viewers, as the reason Austria would not return to the contest in 2008. ORF programme director Wolfgang Lorenz also hinted that Austria may withdraw from the contest indefinitely, stating "ORF has no desire to send more talent out of Austria to a competition where they have no chances...Should the situation change, we'll be happy to take part again". Despite withdrawing, the final of the 2008 contest was shown on ORF.

In 2008, the EBU introduced two semi-finals to the contest, hoping that spreading countries out by random draw would prevent the kind of bloc voting that had warded Austria off. Additionally, juries were reintroduced to determine 50% of each country's result in 2009 (albeit not in the semi-finals, in which all but one of the qualifiers were decided entirely by televote). However, Edgar Böhm, director of entertainment for ORF, said that the semi-final format "still incorporates a mix of countries who will be politically favoured in the voting process" and "that, unless a clear guideline as to how the semifinals are organised is made by the EBU, Austria will not be taking part in Moscow 2009". ORF decided not to participate in the 2009 contest, but did broadcast the final as in 2008. The EBU announced that they would work harder to bring Austria back to the contest in 2010, along with former participants Monaco and Italy. It was, however, confirmed that Austria would not participate in the 2010 contest in Oslo. In July 2010, the chairman of ORF, Alexander Wrabetz, stated that Austria would return for the 2011 contest, due to it being held in its neighbour Germany. In 2011, Austria reached the final for the first time since 2004.

== Participation overview ==
Table key
1	First place
2	Second place
3	Third place
◁	Last place
◇	Entry selected but did not compete
†	Upcoming event

Year	Artist	Song	Language	Final	Points	Semi	Points
1957	Bob Martin	"Wohin, kleines Pony?"	German	10 ◁	3	No semi-finals	
1958	Liane Augustin	"Die ganze Welt braucht Liebe"	German	5	8	No semi-finals	
1959	Ferry Graf	"Der K. und K. Kalypso aus Wien"	German	9	4	No semi-finals	
1960	Harry Winter	"Du hast mich so fasziniert"	German	7	6	No semi-finals	
1961	Jimmy Makulis	"Sehnsucht"	German	15 ◁	1	No semi-finals	
1962	Eleonore Schwarz	"Nur in der Wiener Luft"	German	13 ◁	0	No semi-finals	
1963	Carmela Corren	"Vielleicht geschieht ein Wunder"	German, English	7	16	No semi-finals	
1964	Udo Jürgens	"Warum nur, warum?"	German	6	11	No semi-finals	
1965	Udo Jürgens	"Sag ihr, ich lass sie grüßen"	German	4	16	No semi-finals	
1966	Udo Jürgens	"Merci, Chérie"	German	1	31	No semi-finals	
1967	Peter Horten	"Warum es hunderttausend Sterne gibt"	German	14	2	No semi-finals	
1968	Karel Gott	"Tausend Fenster"	German	13	2	No semi-finals	
1971	Marianne Mendt	"Musik"	German (Note: Specifically Viennese German)	16	66	No semi-finals	
1972	The Milestones	"Falter im Wind"	German	5	100	No semi-finals	
1976	Waterloo and Robinson	"My Little World"	English	5	80	No semi-finals	
1977	Schmetterlinge	"Boom Boom Boomerang"	German, English	17	11	No semi-finals	
1978	Springtime	"Mrs. Caroline Robinson"	German	15	14	No semi-finals	
1979	Christina Simon	"Heute in Jerusalem"	German	18 ◁	5	No semi-finals	
1980	Blue Danube	"Du bist Musik"	German	8	64	No semi-finals	
1981	Marty Brem	"Wenn du da bist"	German	17	20	No semi-finals	
1982	Mess	"Sonntag"	German	9	57	No semi-finals	
1983	Westend	"Hurricane"	German	9	53	No semi-finals	
1984	Anita	"Einfach weg"	German	19 ◁	5	No semi-finals	
1985	Gary Lux	"Kinder dieser Welt"	German	8	60	No semi-finals	
1986	Timna Brauer	"Die Zeit ist einsam"	German	18	12	No semi-finals	
1987	Gary Lux	"Nur noch Gefühl"	German	20	8	No semi-finals	
1988	Wilfried	"Lisa Mona Lisa"	German	21 ◁	0	No semi-finals	
1989	Thomas Forstner	"Nur ein Lied"	German	5	97	No semi-finals	
1990	Simone	"Keine Mauern mehr"	German	10	58	No semi-finals	
1991	Thomas Forstner	"Venedig im Regen"	German	22 ◁	0	No semi-finals	
1992	Tony Wegas	"Zusammen geh'n"	German	10	63	No semi-finals	
1993	Tony Wegas	"Maria Magdalena"	German	14	32	Kvalifikacija za Millstreet	
1994	Petra Frey	"Für den Frieden der Welt"	German	17	19	No semi-finals	
1995	Stella Jones	"Die Welt dreht sich verkehrt"	German	13	67	No semi-finals	
1996	George Nussbaumer	"Weil's dr guat got"	German (Note: Specifically Vorarlbergisch, a High Alemannic dialect)	10	68	6	80
1997	Bettina Soriat	"One Step"	German	21	12	No semi-finals	
1999	Bobbie Singer	"Reflection"	English	10	65	No semi-finals	
2000	The Rounder Girls	"All to You"	English	14	34	No semi-finals	
2002	Manuel Ortega	"Say a Word"	English	18	26	No semi-finals	
2003	Alf Poier	"Weil der Mensch zählt"	German (Note: Specifically Styrian, a Southern Bavarian dialect)	6	101	No semi-finals	
2004	Tie Break	"Du bist"	German	21	9	Top 11 in 2003 contest (Note: According to the then-Eurovision rules, the top ten non-Big Four countries from the previous year along with the Big Four automatically qualified for the Grand Final without having to compete in semi-finals. For example, if Germany and France placed inside the top ten, the 11th and 12th spots were advanced to next year's Grand Final along with all countries ranked in the top ten.)	
2005	Global.Kryner	"Y así"	English, Spanish	Failed to qualify		21	30
2007	Eric Papilaya	"Get a Life – Get Alive"	English	Failed to qualify		27	4
2011	Nadine Beiler	"The Secret Is Love"	English	18	64	7	69
2012	Trackshittaz	"Woki mit deim Popo"	German (Note: Specifically Mühlviertlerisch, a Central Bavarian dialect spoken in Upper Austria)	Failed to qualify		18 ◁	8
2013	Natália Kelly	"Shine"	English	Failed to qualify		14	27
2014	Conchita Wurst	"Rise Like a Phoenix"	English	1	290	1	169
2015	The Makemakes	"I Am Yours"	English	26	0	Host country	
2016	Zoë	"Loin d'ici"	French	13	151	7	170
2017	Nathan Trent	"Running on Air"	English	16	93	7	147
2018	Cesár Sampson	"Nobody but You"	English	3	342	4	231
2019	Paenda	"Limits"	English	Failed to qualify		17	21
2020	Vincent Bueno ◇	"Alive" ◇	English ◇	Contest cancelled (Note: The 2020 contest was cancelled due to the COVID-19 pandemic.)			
2021	Vincent Bueno	"Amen"	English	Failed to qualify		12	66
2022	Lumix feat. Pia Maria	"Halo"	English	Failed to qualify		15	42
2023	Teya and Salena	"Who the Hell Is Edgar?"	English	15	120	2	137
2024	Kaleen	"We Will Rave"	English	24	24	9	46
2025	JJ	"Wasted Love"	English	1	436	5	104
2026	Cosmó	"Tanzschein"	German	24	6	Host country	
2027	Confirmed intention to participate †						

== Hostings ==
Year	Location	Venue	Presenter
1967	Vienna	Großer Festsaal der Wiener Hofburg	Erica Vaal
2015	Vienna	Wiener Stadthalle	Arabella Kiesbauer, Alice Tumler, Mirjam Weichselbraun and Conchita Wurst
2026	Vienna	Wiener Stadthalle	Victoria Swarovski and Michael Ostrowski

== Awards ==
=== Marcel Bezençon Awards ===
Year	Category	Song	Performer(s)	Composer(s)	Host city	Ref.
2014	Press Award	"Rise Like a Phoenix"	Conchita Wurst	Charley Mason, Joey Patulka, Ali Zuckowski, Julian Maas	(Denmark) Copenhagen	

== Related involvement ==
=== Conductors ===
Year	Conductor (Note: All conductors are of Austrian nationality unless otherwise noted.)	Musical Director	Notes	Ref.
1957	Carl de Groof	N/A		
1958	Willy Fantel	N/A		
1959	(France) Franck Pourcel	N/A	(Note: Host conductor)	
1960	Robert Stolz	N/A		
1961	(France) Franck Pourcel	N/A	(Note: Host conductor)	
1962	Bruno Uher	N/A		
1963	Erwin Halletz	N/A		
1964	Johannes Fehring	N/A		
1965	(Italy) Gianni Ferrio	N/A	(Note: Host conductor)	
1966	Hans Hammerschmid	N/A		
1967	Johannes Fehring			
1968	Robert Opratko	N/A		
1971	Robert Opratko	N/A		
1972	Erich Kleinschuster	N/A		
1976	Erich Kleinschuster	N/A		
1977	Christian Kolonovits	N/A		
1978	Richard Oesterreicher	N/A		
1979	Richard Oesterreicher	N/A		
1980	Richard Oesterreicher	N/A		
1981	Richard Oesterreicher	N/A		
1982	Richard Oesterreicher	N/A		
1983	Richard Oesterreicher	N/A		
1984	Richard Oesterreicher	N/A		
1985	Richard Oesterreicher	N/A		
1986	Richard Oesterreicher	N/A		
1987	Richard Oesterreicher	N/A		
1988	Harald Neuwirth	N/A		
1989	No conductor	N/A		
1990	Richard Oesterreicher	N/A		
1991	Richard Oesterreicher	N/A		
1992	Leon Ives	N/A		
1993	Christian Kolonovits	N/A		
1994	(Germany) Hermann Weindorf	N/A		
1995	Michael F. Kienzl	N/A		
1996	Mischa W. Krausz	N/A		
1997	No conductor	N/A		

=== Heads of delegation ===
Year	Head of delegation	Refs.
2019–2024	Stefan Zechner	

=== Commentators and spokespersons ===
Between the 1970 and 1998 contests, every contest was commentated by Austrian radio journalist and actor Ernst Grissemann, with the exception of the 1979 and 1990 contests. Grissemann admitted to future German commentator Peter Urban in 1995 that he only stayed for the dress rehearsal and then provided the Austrian commentary live from the ORF studios. After 1998 Grissemann stepped down from the commentary and was replaced by Andi Knoll. Austria has also broadcast the contests which it did not compete in, except for the 2010 contest.

Television and radio commentators and spokespersons
Year	Television		Radio		Spokesperson	Ref.
Year	Channel	Commentator(s)	Channel	Commentator(s)	Spokesperson	Ref.
1956	ORF	Unknown	No radio broadcast		Did not participate	
1957	ORF	Unknown	No radio broadcast		Unknown	
1958	ORF	Unknown	No radio broadcast		Unknown	
1959	ORF	Unknown	No radio broadcast		Unknown	
1960	ORF	Unknown	No radio broadcast		Unknown	
1961	ORF	Unknown	No radio broadcast		Unknown	
1962	ORF	Unknown	No radio broadcast		Unknown	
1963	ORF	Hanns Joachim Friedrichs	No radio broadcast		Unknown	
1964	ORF	Unknown	No radio broadcast		Unknown	
1965	ORF	Unknown	No radio broadcast		Unknown	
1966	ORF	Hans-Joachim Rauschenbach	No radio broadcast		Unknown	
1967	FS1	Emil Kollpacher	No radio broadcast		Unknown	
1968	FS1	Unknown	No radio broadcast		Unknown	
1969	FS1	Unknown	No radio broadcast		Did not participate	
1970	FS1	Ernst Grissemann	No radio broadcast		Did not participate	
1971	FS1	Ernst Grissemann	No radio broadcast		No spokesperson	
1972	FS2	Ernst Grissemann	No radio broadcast		No spokesperson	
1973	FS2	Ernst Grissemann	No radio broadcast		Did not participate	
1974	FS2	Ernst Grissemann	No radio broadcast		Did not participate	
1975	FS2	Ernst Grissemann	No radio broadcast		Did not participate	
1976	FS2	Ernst Grissemann	No radio broadcast		Unknown	
1977	FS1	Ernst Grissemann	No radio broadcast		Unknown	
1978	FS2	Ernst Grissemann	No radio broadcast		Unknown	
1979	FS1	Max Schautzer	No radio broadcast		Unknown	
1980	FS2	Ernst Grissemann	No radio broadcast		Unknown	
1981	FS2	Ernst Grissemann	No radio broadcast		Unknown	
1982	FS2	Ernst Grissemann	No radio broadcast		Unknown	
1983	FS2	Ernst Grissemann	No radio broadcast		Unknown	
1984	FS2	Ernst Grissemann	No radio broadcast		Unknown	
1985	FS1	Ernst Grissemann	No radio broadcast		Unknown	
1986	FS1	Ernst Grissemann	No radio broadcast		Unknown	
1987	FS1	Ernst Grissemann	No radio broadcast		Unknown	
1988	FS1	Ernst Grissemann	No radio broadcast		Unknown	
1989	FS1	Ernst Grissemann	No radio broadcast		Unknown	
1990	FS1	Barbara Stöckl	No radio broadcast		Unknown	
1991	FS1	Unknown	No radio broadcast		Unknown	
1992	FS1	Ernst Grissemann	No radio broadcast		Unknown	
1993	ORF 1	Ernst Grissemann	No radio broadcast		Unknown	
1994	ORF 1	Ernst Grissemann	No radio broadcast		Tilia Herold	
1995	ORF 1	Ernst Grissemann	FM4	Stermann & Grissemann	Tilia Herold	
1996	ORF 1	Ernst Grissemann	FM4	Stermann & Grissemann	Martina Rupp	
1997	ORF 1	Ernst Grissemann	FM4	Stermann & Grissemann	Adriana Zartl	
1998	ORF 1	Ernst Grissemann	FM4	Stermann & Grissemann	Did not participate	
1999	ORF 1	Andi Knoll	FM4	Stermann & Grissemann	Dodo Roscic	
2000	ORF 1	Andi Knoll	FM4	Stermann & Grissemann	Dodo Roscic	
2001	ORF 1	Andi Knoll	FM4	Stermann & Grissemann	Did not participate	
2002	ORF 1	Andi Knoll	FM4	Stermann & Grissemann	Dodo Roscic	
2003	ORF 1	Andi Knoll	No radio broadcast		Dodo Roscic	
2004	ORF 1	Andi Knoll	No radio broadcast		Dodo Roscic	
2005	ORF 1	Andi Knoll	No radio broadcast		Dodo Roscic	
2006	ORF 1 (Final)	Andi Knoll	No radio broadcast		Did not participate	
2007	ORF 1	Andi Knoll	No radio broadcast		Eva Pölzl	
2008	ORF 1 (Final)	Andi Knoll	No radio broadcast		Did not participate	
2009	ORF 1	Benny Hörtnagl	No radio broadcast		Did not participate	
2010	No broadcast				Did not participate	
2011	ORF eins	Andi Knoll	Hitradio Ö3	Martin Blumenau (All shows); Benny Hörtnagl (Final)	Kati Bellowitsch	
2012	ORF eins	Andi Knoll (All shows); Stermann and Grissemann and Lukas Plöchl (Final)	No radio broadcast		Kati Bellowitsch	
2013	ORF eins	Andi Knoll	No radio broadcast		Kati Bellowitsch	
2014	ORF eins	Andi Knoll	No radio broadcast		Kati Bellowitsch	
2015	ORF eins	Andi Knoll	No radio broadcast		Kati Bellowitsch	
2016	ORF eins	Andi Knoll	No radio broadcast		Kati Bellowitsch	
2017	ORF eins	Andi Knoll	No radio broadcast		Kristina Inhof	
2018	ORF eins	Andi Knoll	No radio broadcast		Kati Bellowitsch	
2019	ORF eins	Andi Knoll	No radio broadcast		Philipp Hansa	
2020	~~ORF 1~~	Not announced before cancellation				
2021	ORF 1	Andi Knoll	No radio broadcast		Philipp Hansa	
2022	ORF 1	Andi Knoll	FM4 (final)	Kurdwin Ayub, Florian Alexander, Hannes Duscher and Roland Gratzer	Philipp Hansa	
2023	ORF 1	Andi Knoll	FM4 (final)	Jan Böhmermann and Olli Schulz	Philipp Hansa	
2024	ORF 1	Andi Knoll	FM4 (final)	Jan Böhmermann and Olli Schulz	Philipp Hansa	
2025	ORF 1	Andi Knoll	FM4 (final)	Jan Böhmermann and Olli Schulz	Philipp Hansa	
2026	ORF 1	Andi Knoll	FM4 (final)	Jan Böhmermann and Olli Schulz	Philipp Hansa	

== Photo gallery ==
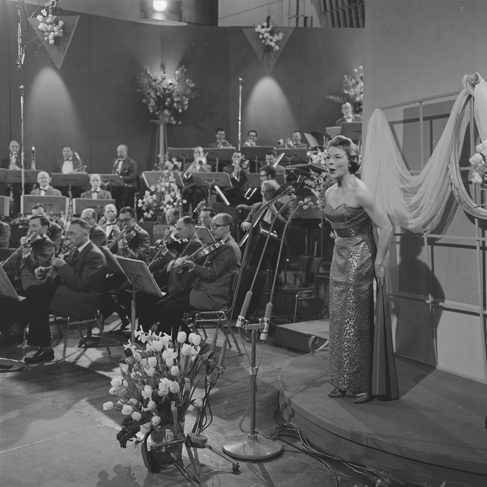
Liane Augustin performing "Die ganze Welt braucht Liebe" in Hilversum (1958)

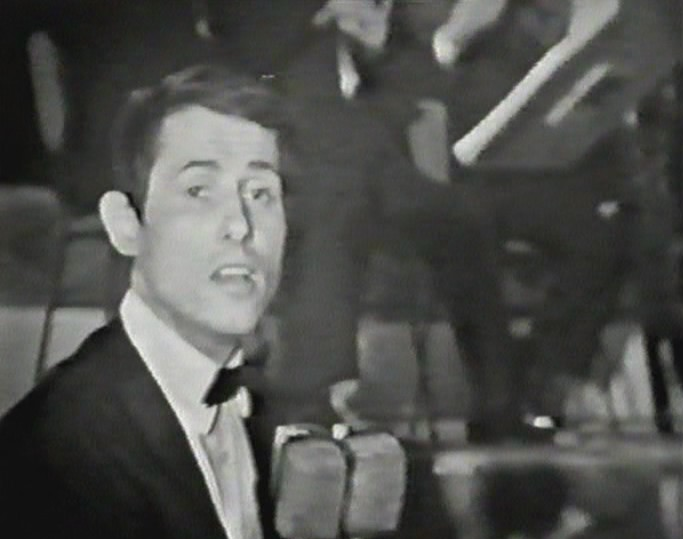
Udo Jürgens performing "Sag ihr, ich lass sie grüßen" in Naples (1965)

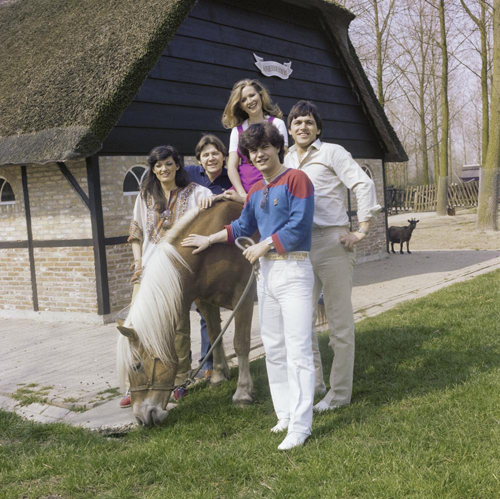
Postcard for Blue Danube in The Hague (1980)

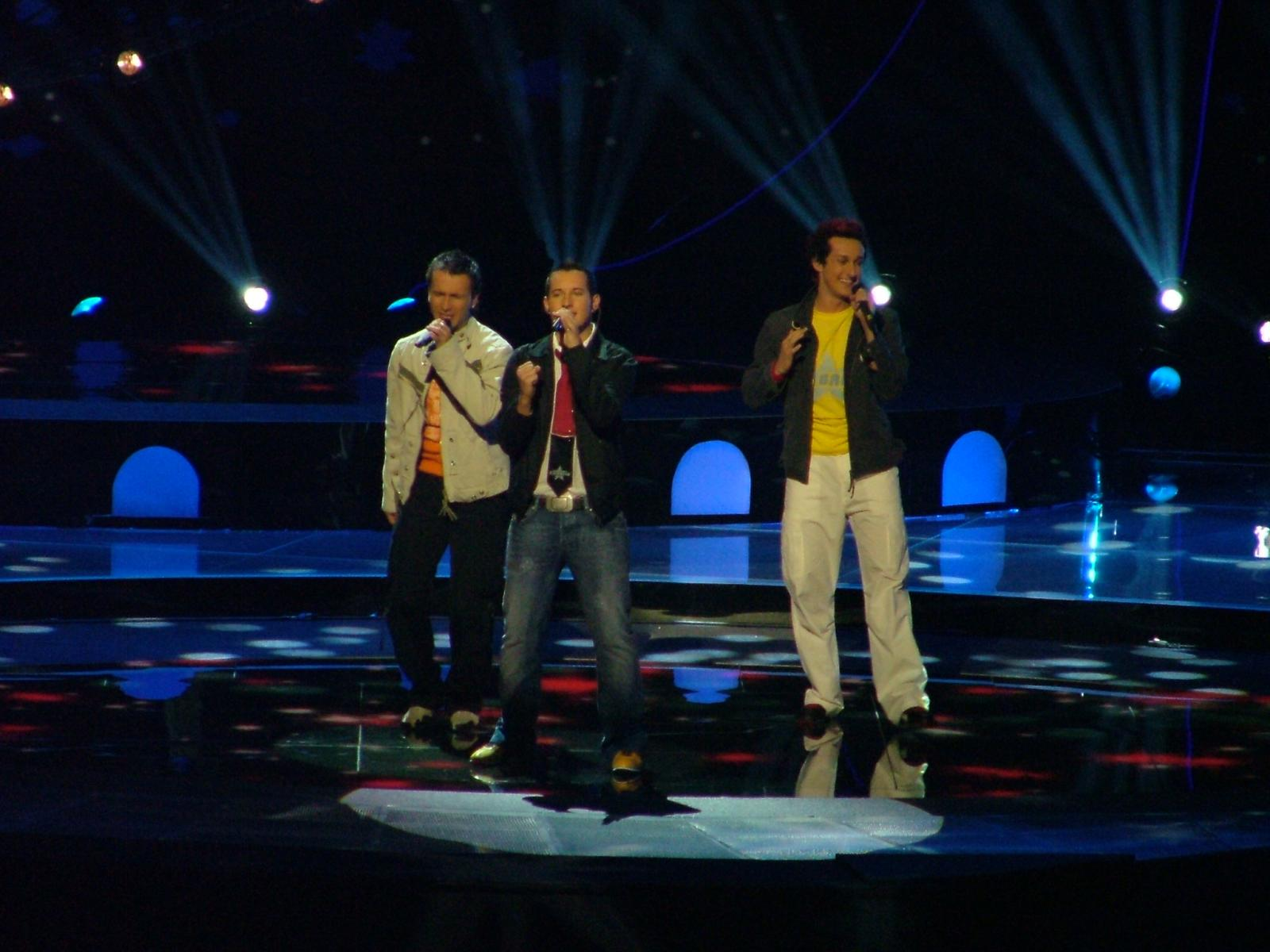
Tie Break performing "Du bist" in Istanbul (2004)

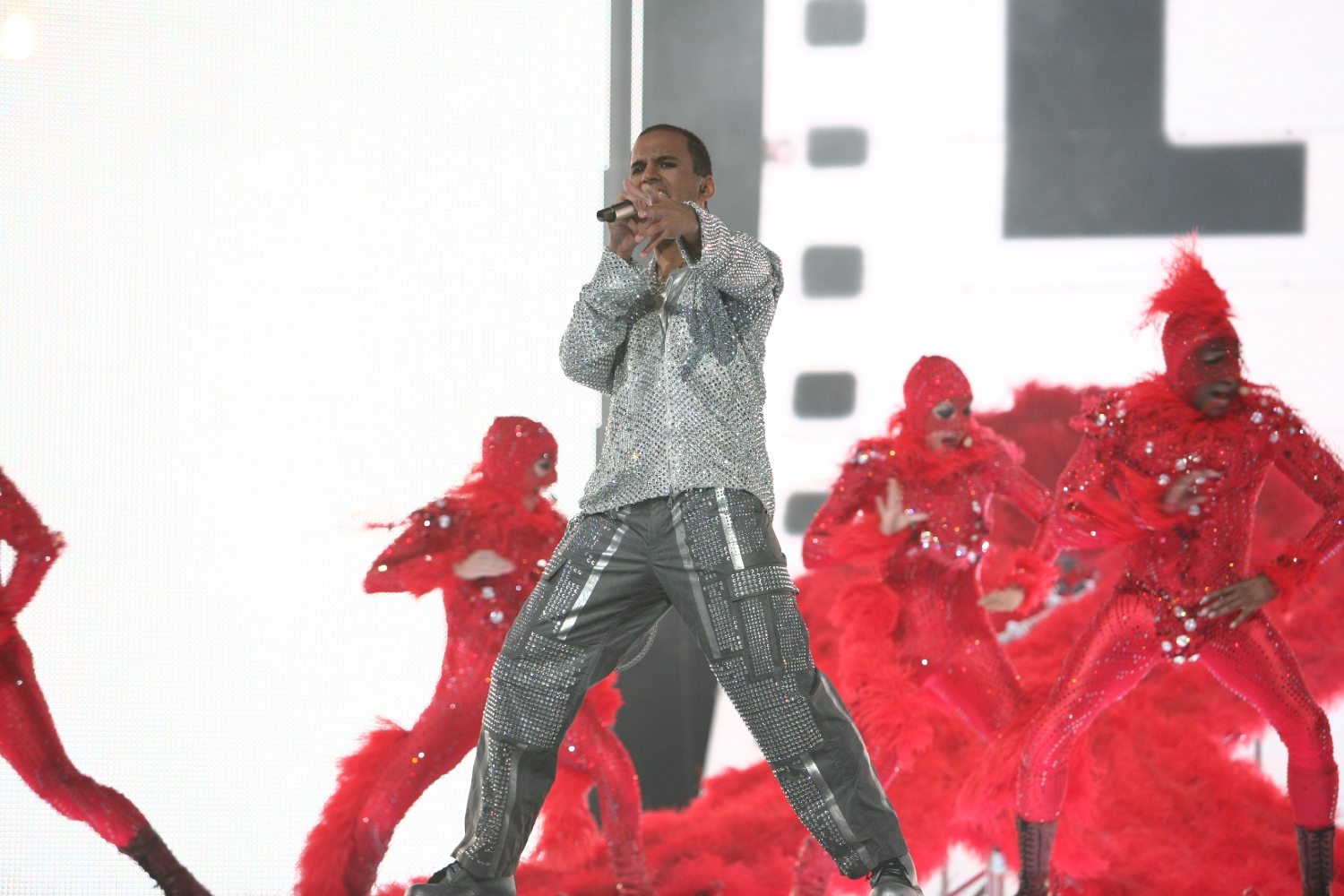
Eric Papilaya performing "Get a Life – Get Alive" in Helsinki (2007)

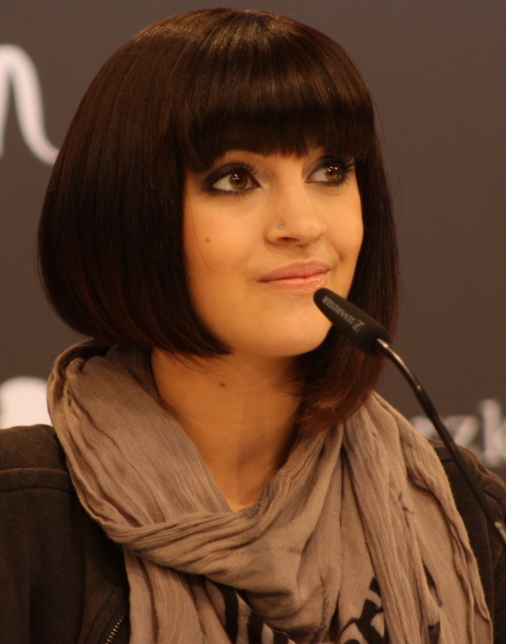
Nadine Beiler in Düsseldorf (2011)

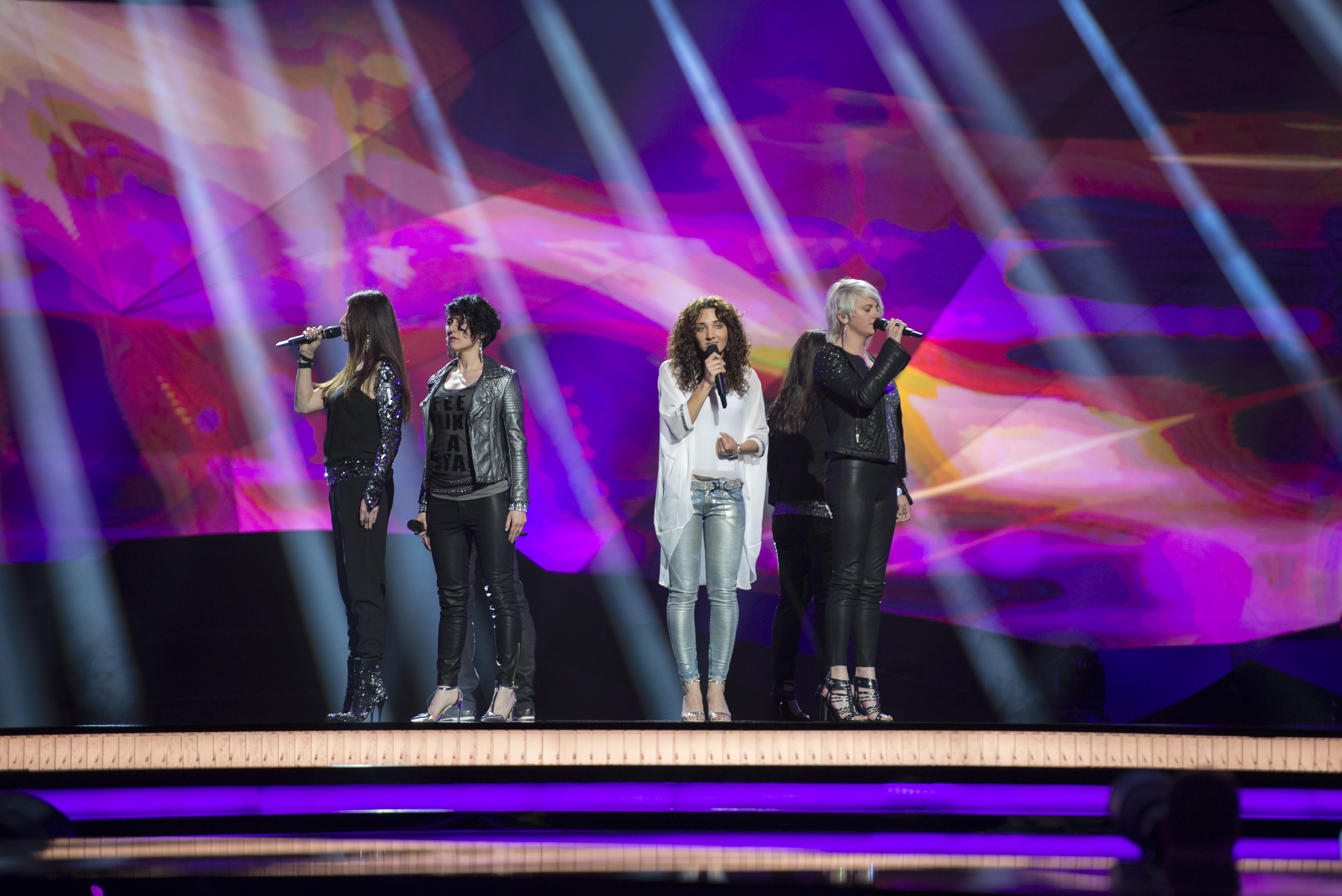
Natália Kelly performing "Shine" in Malmö (2013)

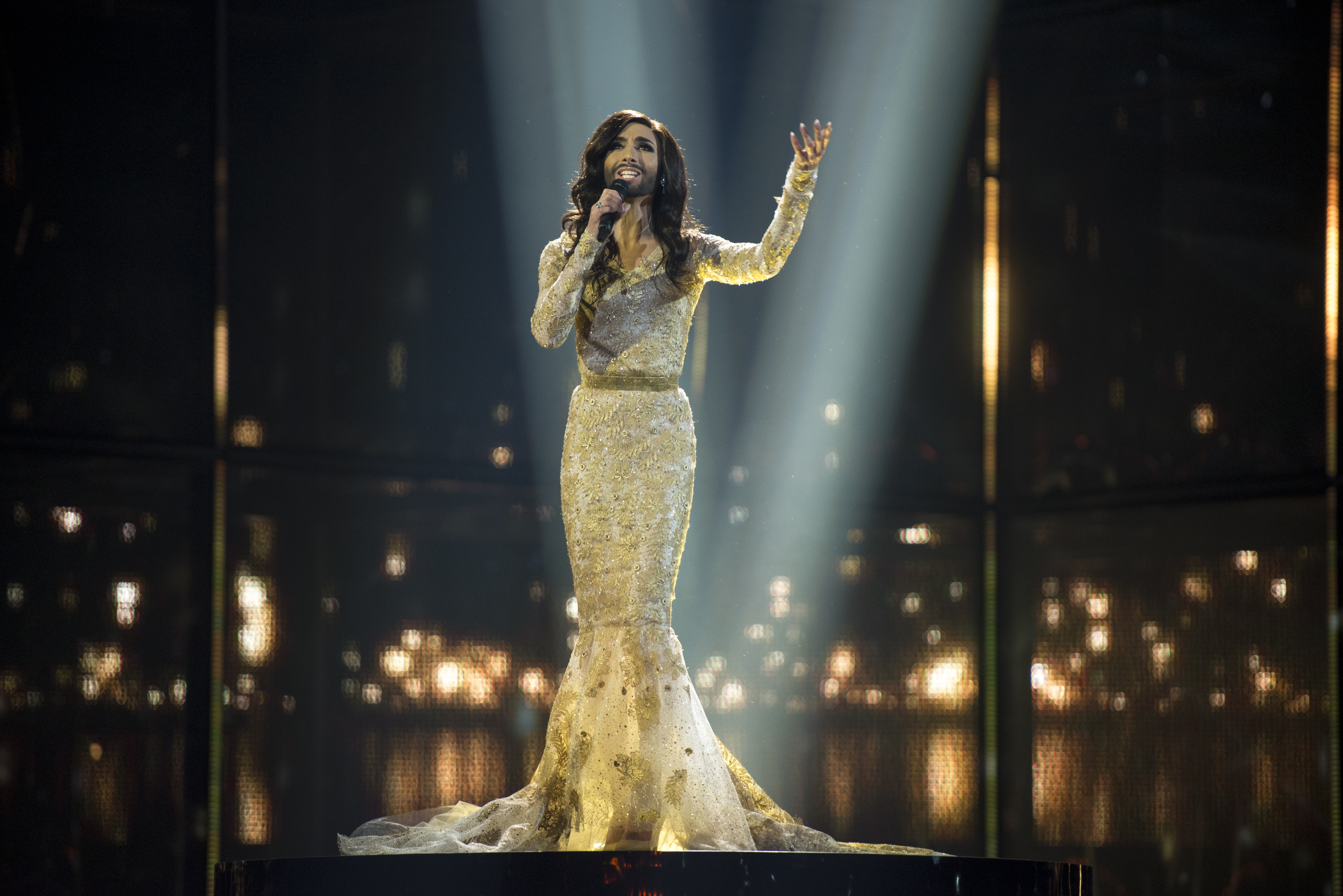
Conchita Wurst performing "Rise Like a Phoenix" in Copenhagen (2014)

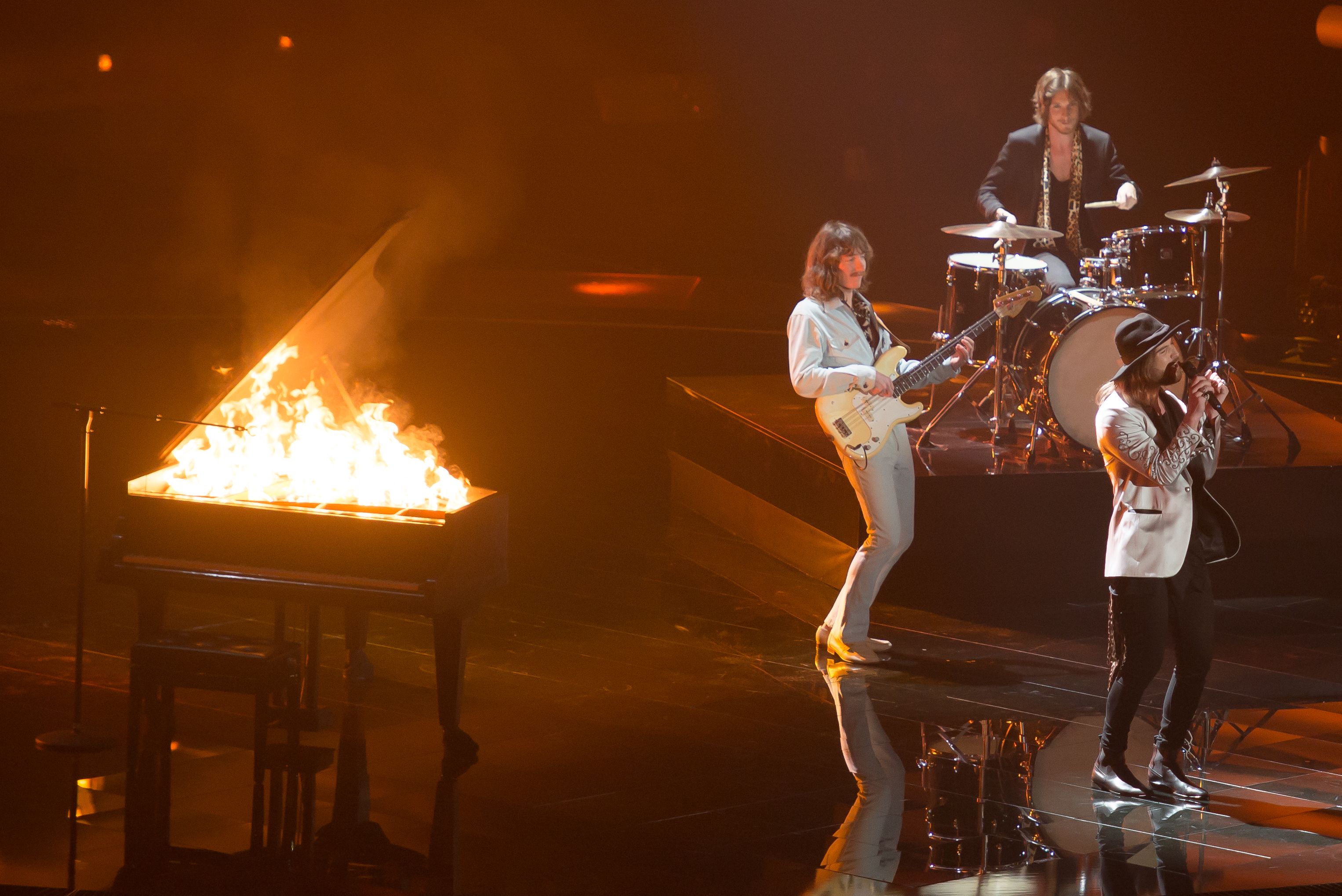
The Makemakes performing "I Am Yours" in Vienna (2015)

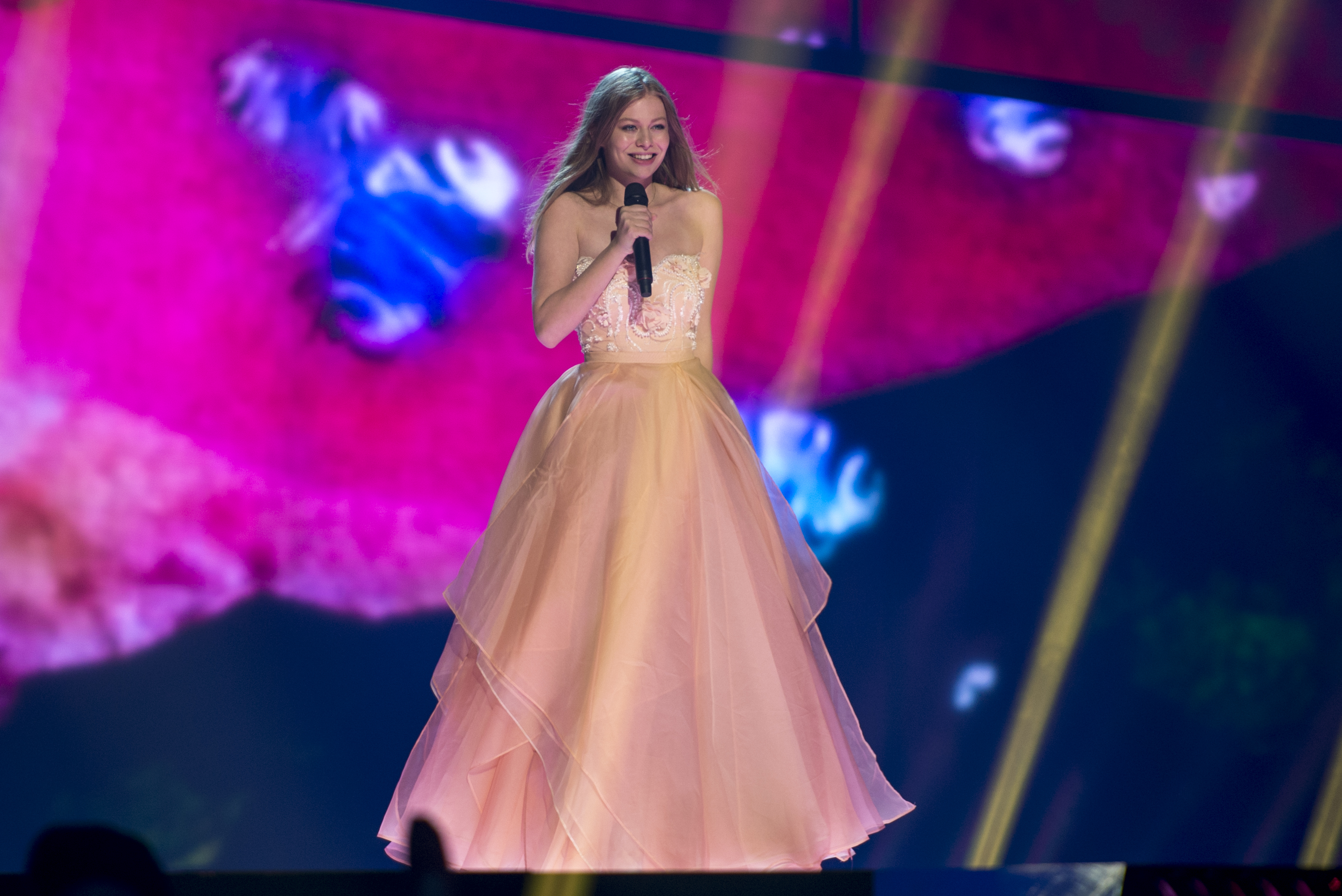
Zoë performing "Loin d'ici" in Stockholm (2016)

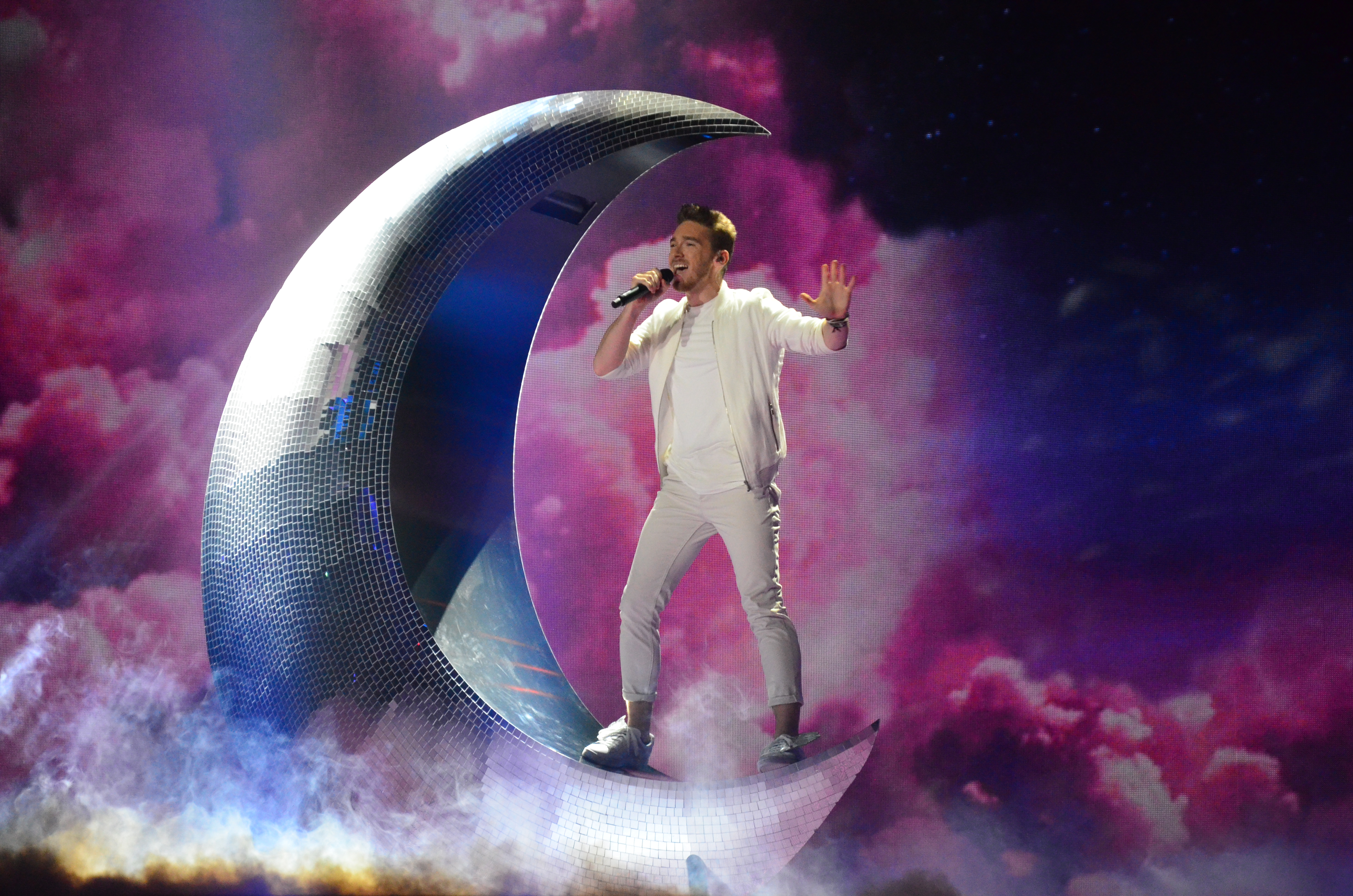
Nathan Trent performing "Running on Air" in Kyiv (2017)

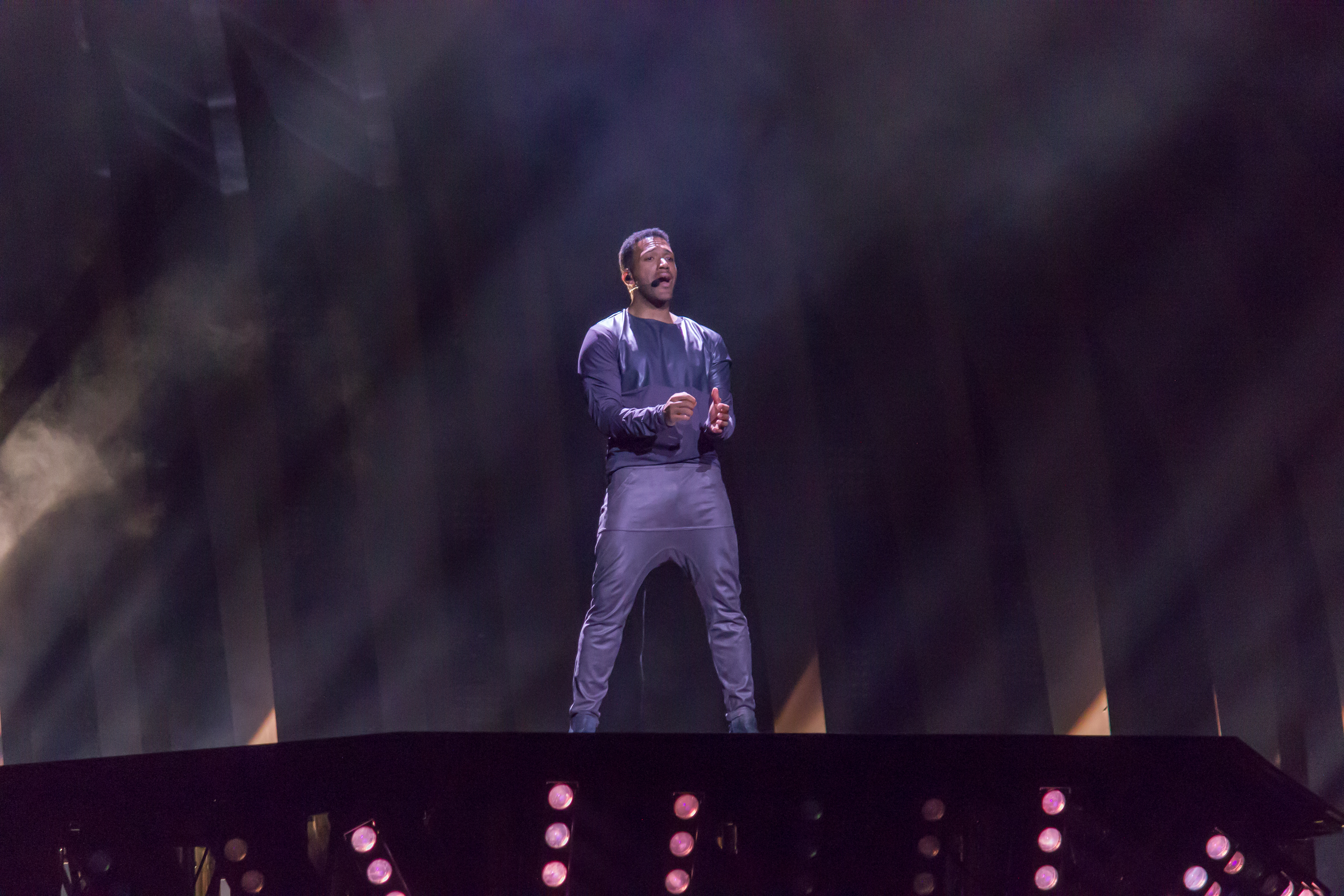
Cesár Sampson performing "Nobody but You" in Lisbon (2018)

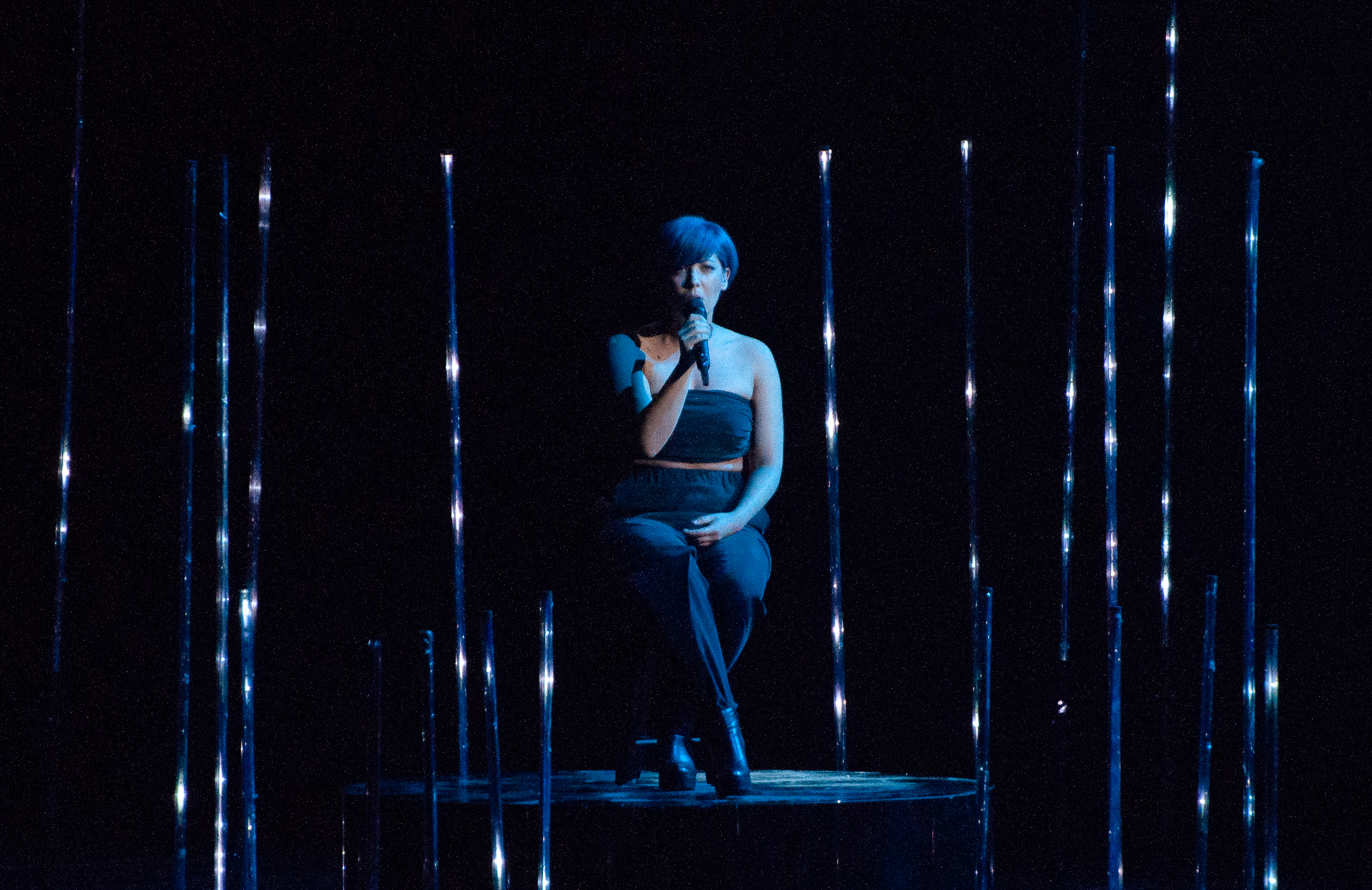
Paenda performing "Limits" in Tel Aviv (2019)

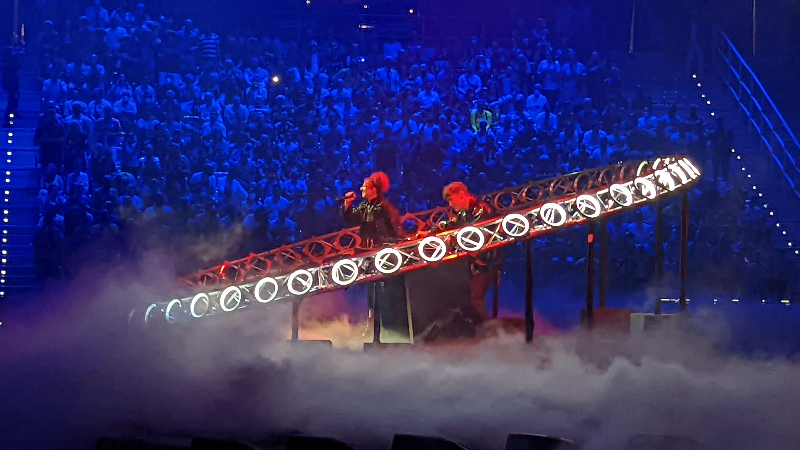
Lumix and Pia Maria performing "Halo" in Turin (2022)

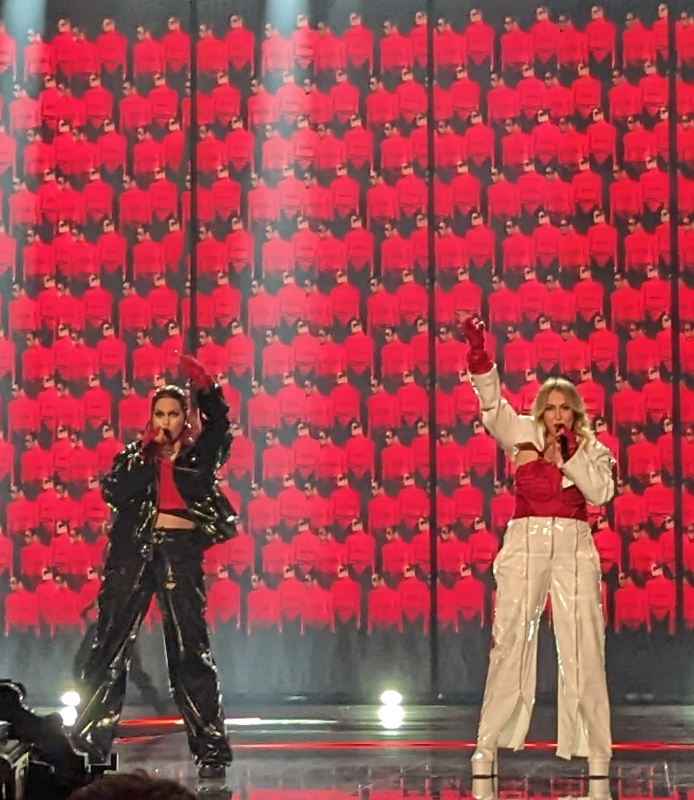
Teya and Salena performing "Who the Hell Is Edgar?" in Liverpool (2023)

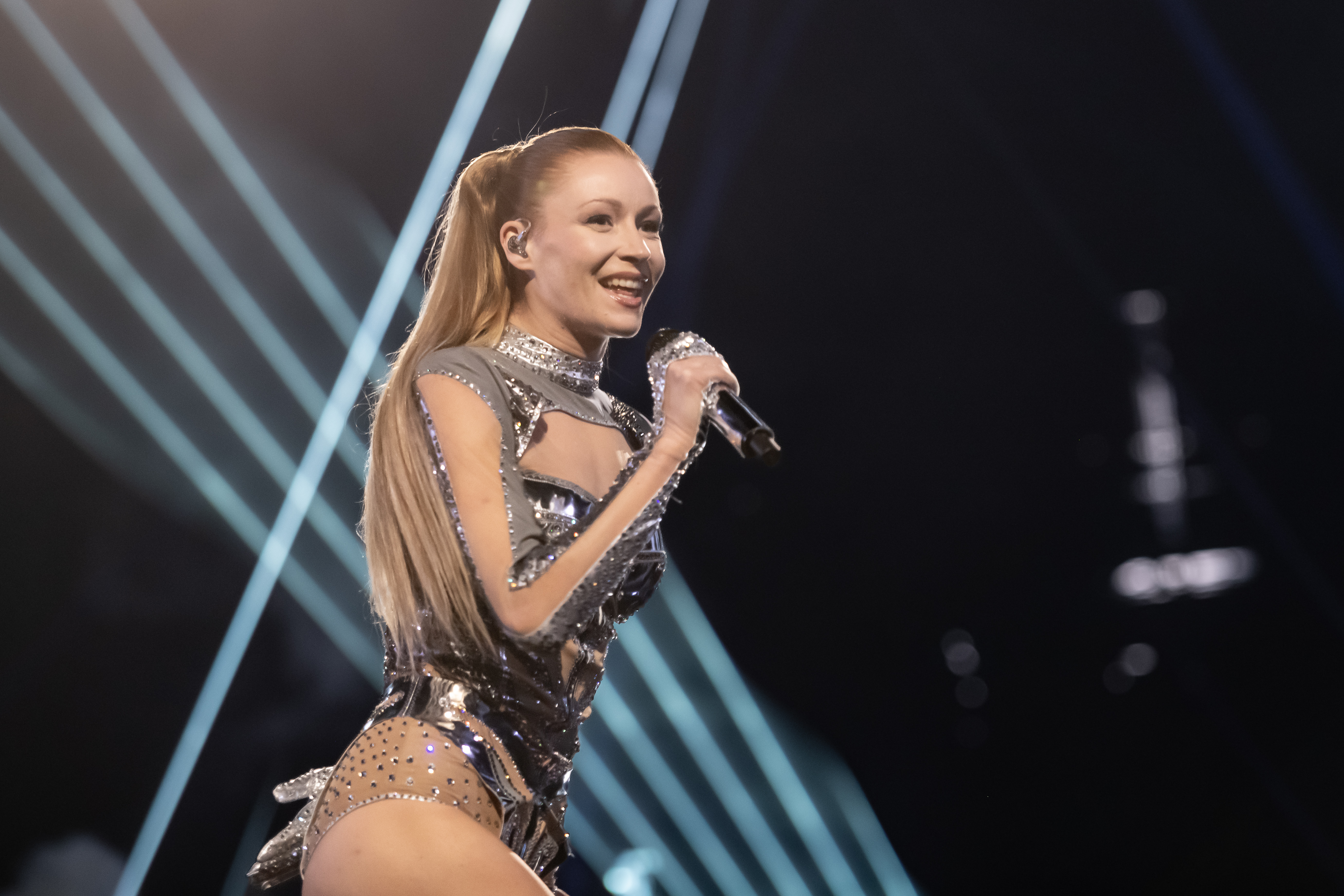
Kaleen performing "We Will Rave" in Malmö (2024)

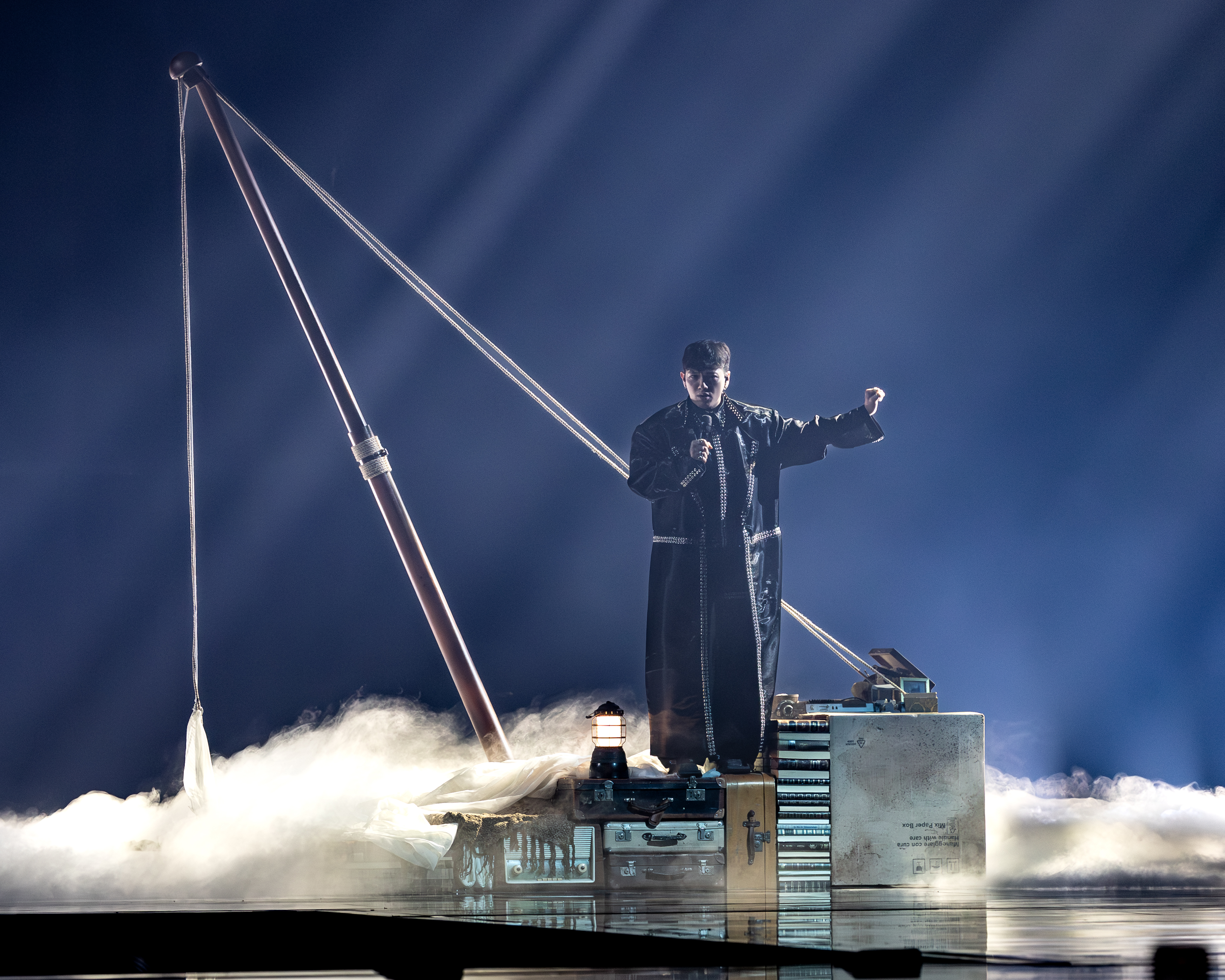
JJ performing "Wasted Love" in Basel (2025)

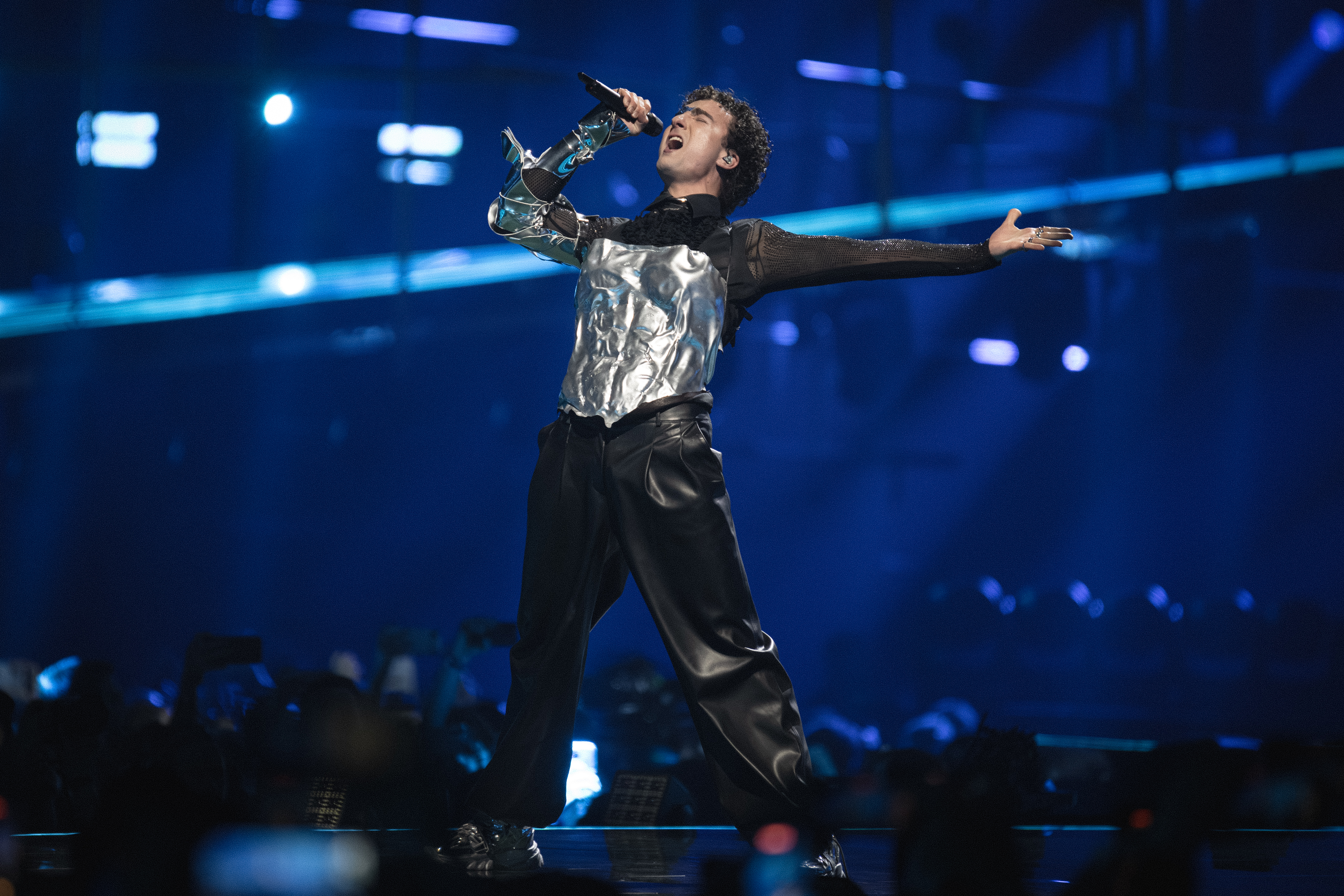
Cosmó performing "Tanzschein" in Vienna (2026)

== Notes and references ==
=== Works cited ===
- O'Connor, John Kennedy (2010). The Eurovision Song Contest: The Official History (2nd ed.). London: Carlton Books. ISBN 978-1-84732-521-1.
- Roxburgh, Gordon (2020). Songs for Europe: The United Kingdom at the Eurovision Song Contest. Vol. Four: The 1990s. Prestatyn: Telos Publishing. ISBN 978-1-84583-163-9.
