= Kaleen (singer) =

Austrian dancer and singer

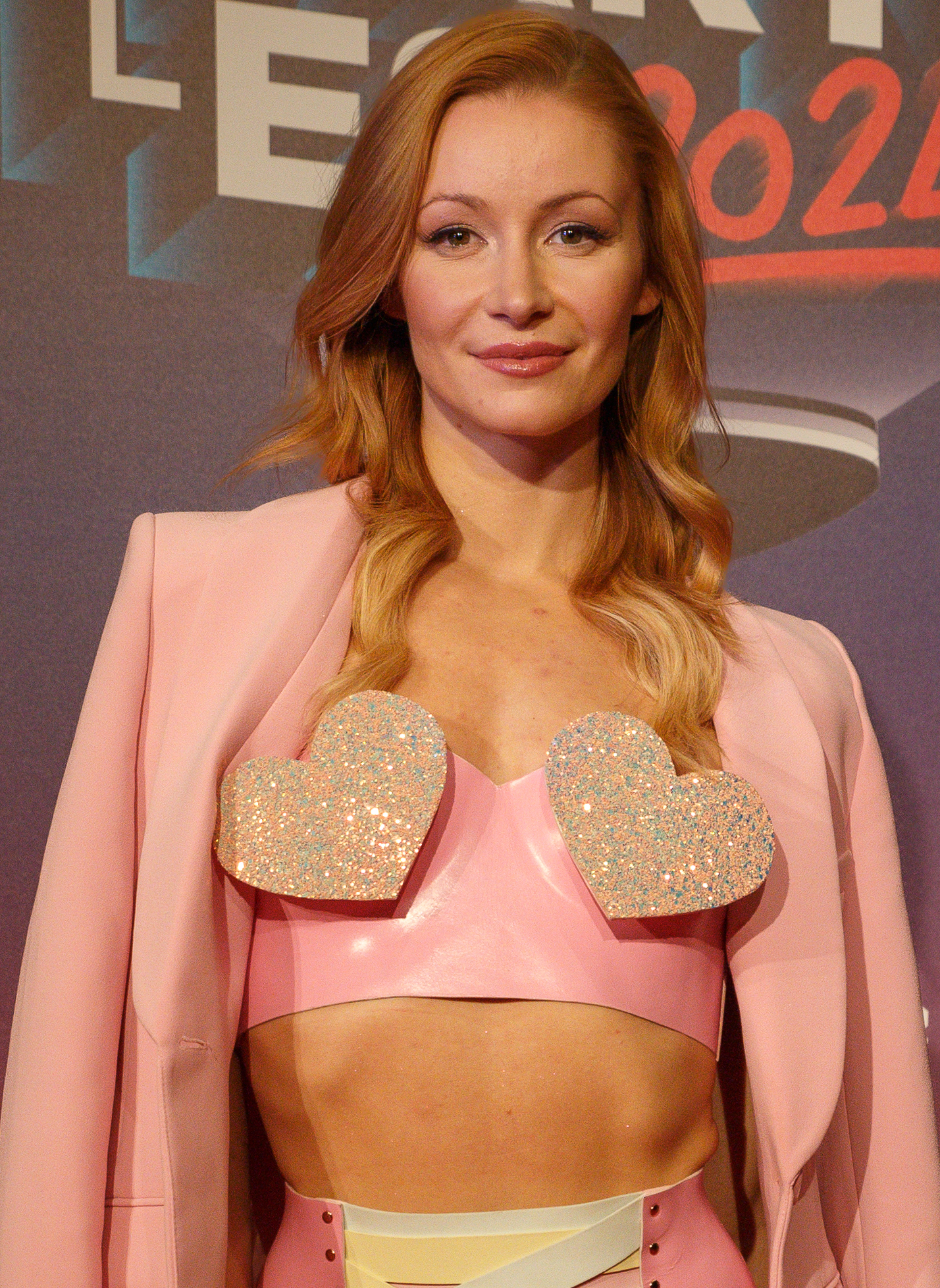
- Kaleen in 2024

Background information
- Born: Marie-Sophie Kreissl; 12 November 1994 (age 31); Wels, Austria
- Genres: Pop
- Years active: 2014–present
- Label: Wifi Records

Marie-Sophie Kreissl (born 12 November 1994), also known professionally as Kaleen, is an Austrian singer, dancer and choreographer. She represented Austria at the Eurovision Song Contest 2024 with the song "We Will Rave".

== Early life ==
Kaleen was raised in Ried im Traunkreis in Upper Austria. She is the granddaughter of Hanneliese Kreißl-Wurth, a composer, lyricist and producer in the hit and folk music genres. She took ballet lessons for the first time at the age of two. At the age of seven, she won her first Austrian championship title.

== Career ==
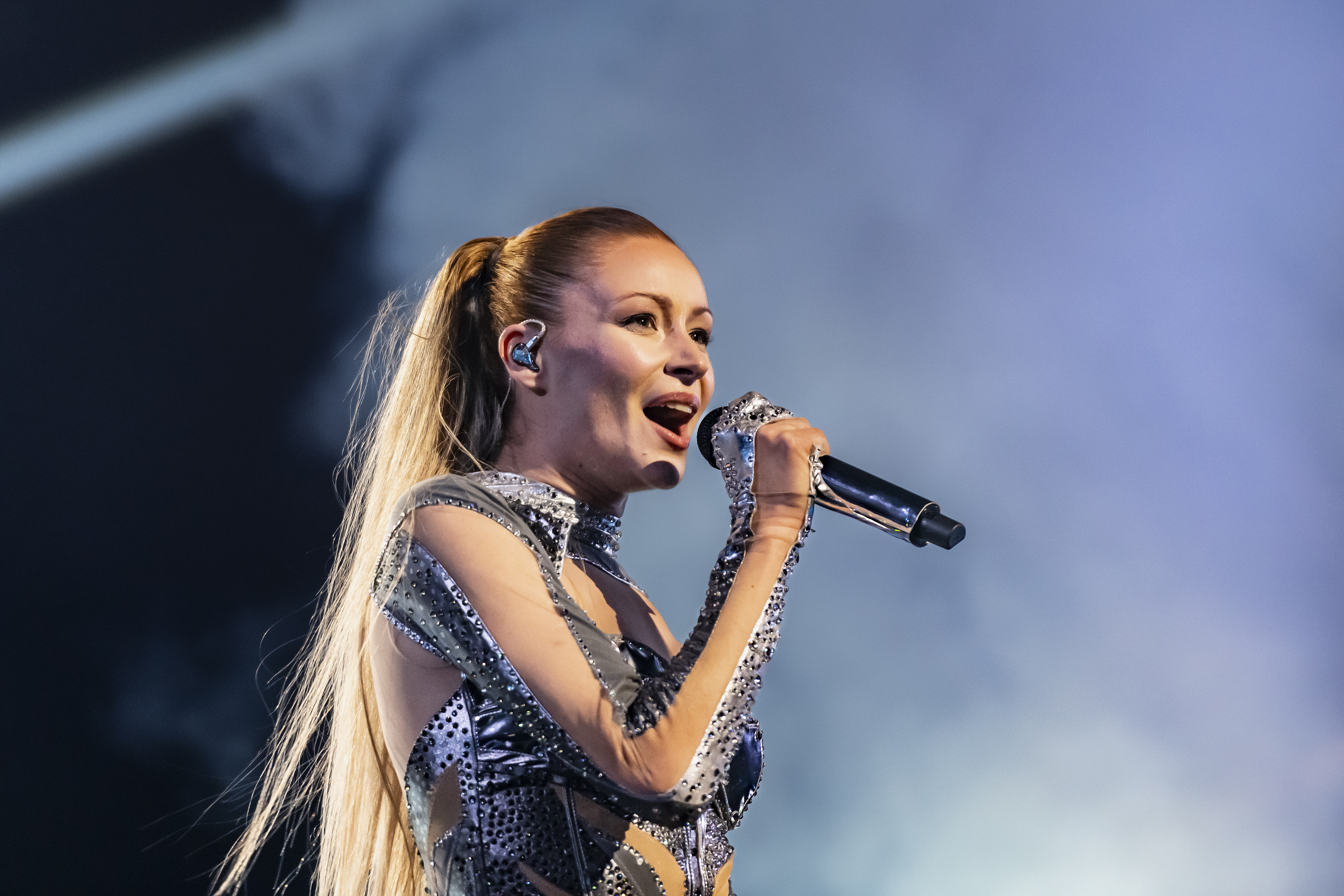
Kaleen performing in Malmö during Eurovision 2024 rehearsal

Kaleen cites Dua Lipa, Little Mix, Ariana Grande, Beyoncé and Zara Larsson as her musical influences.

=== Career beginnings ===
In 2014, she took part in the German version of the dance competition Got to Dance and reached the final together with her dance partner Paulo Albert. Since 2020, she has been working as a choreographer and director for ORF, including for the show Starmania. In 2021, she founded her own record label, Wifi Records. Her first album, Stripping Feelings, was released in September 2023.

=== Eurovision Song Contest ===
Since 2018, she has also been involved with the Eurovision Song Contest and the Junior Eurovision Song Contest in various positions: as a stand-in singer for the rehearsals; as a dancer and choreographer for the interval acts in the 2018 contest; as a creative director for Spain and Bulgaria in the 2021 junior contest; as creative director for Spain and overall stage director in the 2022 contest; and she helped creating the stage performances for Austria, Armenia, Germany, and Georgia in the 2023 contest. She also had competed to represent Austria in the Eurovision Song Contest 2023 with her song "Owe You Pretty", but lost to Teya & Salena's song "Who the Hell Is Edgar?".

==== Competing in 2024 ====
On 16 January 2024, it was announced that Kaleen had been internally selected as Austria's representative at the Eurovision Song Contest 2024, to be held in Malmö, Sweden. The song, titled "We Will Rave", was described as dance-pop and inspired by techno. It was released on 1 March 2024. Kaleen qualified from the second semi-final at Eurovision on 9 May 2024. In the final, the song finished 24th of the 25 competing finalists, with 24 points overall. Following the final, "We Will Rave" reached the Top 20 of the Ö3 Austria Top 40 chart for the first time, peaking at number 18.

=== Post-Eurovision ===
Since the Eurovision Song Contest in May 2024, Kaleen has released a cover version of Sonique’s global hit "It Feels So Good". In February 2025, she released her first out of 5 singles “Knocking on Heaven’s Door.” Shortly after, she followed up with her second single, “Heart in Stereo".

== Discography ==
=== Studio albums ===
List of studio albums, with selected details
| Title | Details |
|---|---|
| Stripping Feelings | Released: 22 September 2023; Label: Wifi Records; Formats: Digital download, streaming |

=== Extended plays ===
List of extended plays, with selected details
| Title | Details |
|---|---|
| Mine | Released: 1 October 2025; Label: Wifi Records; Format: Digital download, streaming |

=== Singles ===
| Title | Year | Peak chart positions | | | | Album |
| Title | Year | AUT | LTU | SWE Heat. | SWI | Album |
|---|---|---|---|---|---|---|
| "Too Good to Not" | 2021 | — | — | — | — | Non-album singles |
| "Don't Wanna Leave You Now" | 2021 | — | — | — | — | Non-album singles |
| "Games" | 2022 | — | — | — | — | Non-album singles |
| "Put You Down" | 2022 | — | — | — | — | Non-album singles |
| "What It Feels Like" | 2023 | — | — | — | — | Stripping Feelings |
| "Stripping Feelings" | 2023 | — | — | — | — | Stripping Feelings |
| "Taking Chances" | 2023 | — | — | — | — | Stripping Feelings |
| "We Will Rave" | 2024 | 18 | 30 | 3 | 75 | Non-album singles |
| "It Feels So Good" | 2024 | — | — | — | — | Non-album singles |
| "Knocking on Heaven’s Door" | 2025 | — | — | — | — | Mine |
| "Heart in Stereo" | 2025 | — | — | — | — | Mine |
| “Pretend We Can Fly" | 2025 | — | — | — | — | Mine |
| “Only U" | 2025 | — | — | — | — | Mine |
| "Replaceable" | 2025 | — | — | — | — | Mine |
"—" denotes a recording that did not chart or was not released in that territory.

Awards and achievements
| Preceded by Teya and Salena with "Who the Hell Is Edgar?" | Austria in the Eurovision Song Contest; 2024 | Succeeded by JJ with "Wasted Love" |
