= Salena (singer) =

Austrian singer (born 1998)

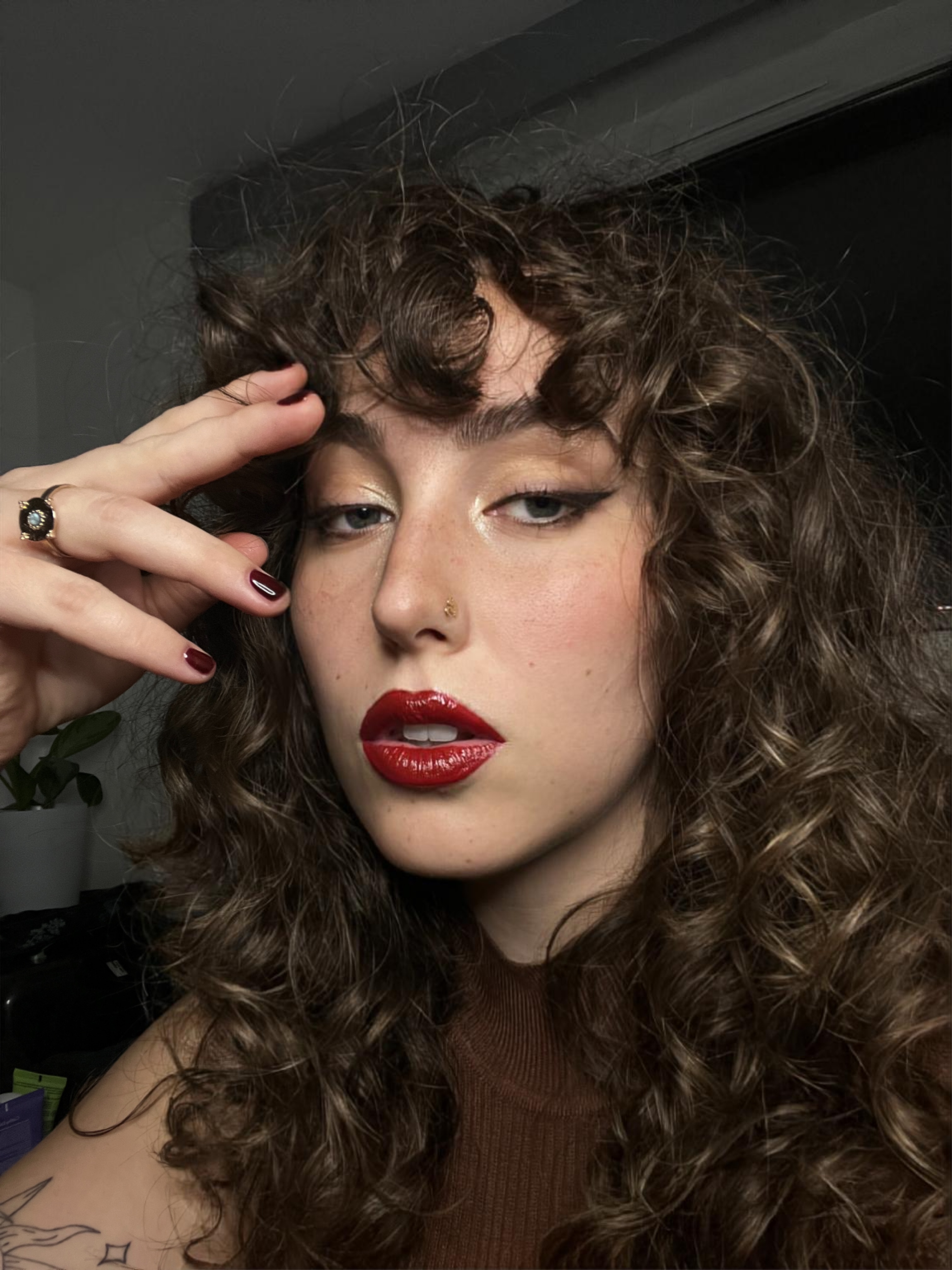
- Salena in 2024

Background information
- Born: Selina-Maria Edbauer; 11 March 1998 (age 28); Leoben, Styria, Austria
- Genre: Pop
- Occupations: Singer; songwriter
- Years active: 2017–present

Selina-Maria Edbauer (born 11 March 1998), known professionally as Salena, is an Austrian singer and songwriter. She represented Austria in the Eurovision Song Contest 2023 alongside Teya with the song "Who the Hell Is Edgar?", finishing in 15th place.

== Biography ==
Selina-Maria Edbauer grew up in Kammern im Liesingtal, Styria. Born and raised in Styria, Selina began singing at the age of seven and later taught herself guitar. She first emerged in the music scene through The Voice of Germany in 2017, where she advanced to the sing-off rounds under the mentorship of Samu Haber. In 2019 she submitted a song titled "Behind The Waterfall" written by Andy Vitolo and John King, for Austria's Eurovision selection, but wasn't chosen. In 2021, she competed in the Austrian talent show Starmania, where she reached the top 32 and also met her duo partner "TEYA" which she represented Austria with at the Eurovision Song Contest 2023 in Liverpool, after applying every year since 2019.

On 31 January 2023, it was announced that Salena had been selected to represent Austria in the Eurovision Song Contest 2023 together with Teya, whom she met during her participation in Starmania. Their entry, named "Who the Hell Is Edgar?", was written at a songwriting camp in the Czech Republic and was released on 8 March 2023. The song qualified from the second semi final on 11 May for the grand final, in which it placed 15th.

== Discography ==
=== Extended plays ===
Title	Details
Growth	Released: 1 May 2026; Label: Self-released; Formats: Digital download, streaming

=== Singles ===
==== As lead artist ====
List of singles as lead artist, with selected chart positions
Title	Year	Peak chart positions							Album or EP
Title	Year	AUT	FIN	ICE	IRE	LTU	SWE	UK	Album or EP
"Pretty Imperfection"	2019	—	—	—	—	—	—	—	Non-album single
"Who the Hell Is Edgar?" (with Teya)	2023	4	20	39	67	10	79	48	Ho Ho Ho
"Bye Bye Bye" (with Teya)	2023	—	—	—	—	—	—	—	Ho Ho Ho
"Ho Ho Ho" (with Teya)	2023	—	—	—	—	—	—	—	Ho Ho Ho
"Picky Promise"	2024	—	—	—	—	—	—	—	Non-album singles
"Vacation"	2024	—	—	—	—	—	—	—	Non-album singles
"Love That's Made to Die For"	2025	—	—	—	—	—	—	—	Growth
"Velvet Gloves"	2025	—	—	—	—	—	—	—	Growth
"I Would Do It Again" (with Daniel Hopes)	2025	—	—	—	—	—	—	—	Non-album single
"Love Is More Than Sex"	2025	—	—	—	—	—	—	—	Growth
"—" denotes a recording that did not chart or was not released in that territory.

==== As featured artist ====
Title	Year	Album
"Lying Still" (J.K. featuring Salena)	2020	Non-album singles
"Walking On Clouds" (7YFN featuring Salena)	2021	Non-album singles
"Castle of Glass" (Yohan Gerber, Paul Keen, Bastize featuring Salena)	2022	Non-album singles

Awards and achievements
Preceded by Lumix feat. Pia Maria with "Halo"	Austria in the Eurovision Song Contest; 2023; With: Teya	Succeeded by Kaleen with "We Will Rave"
