= Teya (musician) =

Austrian singer (born 2000)

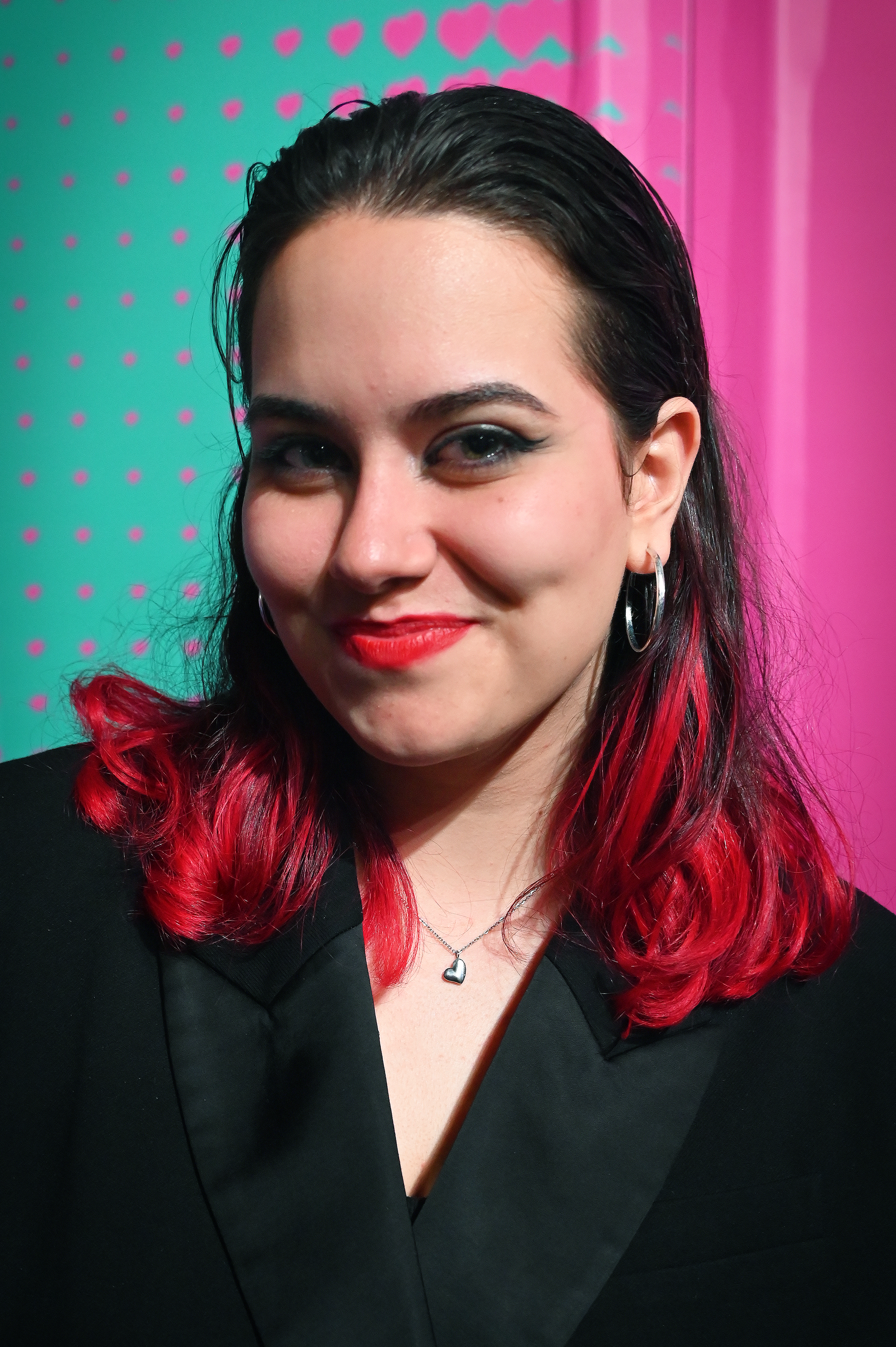
- Teya in 2025

Background information
- Also known as: Teya
- Born: Teodora Špirić; 12 April 2000 (age 26); Vienna, Austria
- Genre: Pop
- Occupations: Singer; songwriter
- Years active: 2017–present
- Website: www.teyamusic.com

Teodora Špirić (Serbian Cyrillic: Теодора Шпирић; born 12 April 2000), known professionally as Teya (stylised in all caps) and formerly as Thea Devy, is an Austrian singer and songwriter. She represented Austria in the Eurovision Song Contest 2023 alongside Salena with the song "Who the Hell Is Edgar?", finishing in 15th place at the grand final. She later co-wrote the winning song of the Eurovision Song Contest 2025 for Austria, "Wasted Love" performed by JJ.

== Biography ==
Teodora Špirić was born on 12 April 2000 in Vienna, Austria to Serbian parents. She spent part of her childhood in Kladovo, Serbia, but later returned to Vienna with her family. She has cited Adele and Amy Winehouse as her main artistic influences.

In 2018, Špirić released her debut single "Waiting For". At the end of 2019, she applied to represent Austria in the Eurovision Song Contest 2020 with the song "Judgement Day". She was among the three shortlisted acts, but was not selected as the Austrian representative. She subsequently submitted the song to Beovizija 2020, the Serbian national selection for the Eurovision Song Contest, under the title "Sudnji dan". The song had been translated into Serbian by Špirić's parents. On 9 January 2020, it was announced that she was selected to participate in the competition. She qualified for the final, where she finished in tenth place with 4 points.

In 2021, Špirić was a participant in the fifth season of the Austrian talent show Starmania. She made it to the top eight contestants, but was eliminated before the final. Later that year, she released the single "Runaway (Stay)" with Croatian singer Ninski, using the stage name Teya.

On 31 January 2023, it was announced that Špirić had been selected to represent Austria in the Eurovision Song Contest 2023 together with Salena, whom she met during her participation in Starmania. Their entry, named "Who the Hell Is Edgar?", was written at a songwriting camp in the Czech Republic and was released on 8 March 2023. The song qualified from the second semi final on 11 May for the grand final, in which it placed 15th.

She co-wrote the song "Wasted Love" with Johannes Pietsch, under his stage name JJ, which went on to win the Eurovision Song Contest 2025 for Austria. She also co-wrote two songs that competed in national selections for different countries that year: "Heaven Sent" performed by Kristy Spiteri, which came second in the Malta's national selection, and "Hold the Light" performed by Dominik Dudek, which came third in the Polish national final.

Špirić provided vocals on the song "Bite Marks" for the video game League of Legends, released on 7 January 2025 in conjunction with the game's first thematical season of 2025. The song was written by Alex Seaver of Mako and Sebastien Najand. She performed the song at the 2025 League of Legends World Championship final on 9 November in Chengdu, China.

== Discography ==
=== EPs ===
Title	Details
Grandma on the Dancefloor	Released: 30 August 2024; Label: CloudKid, Manifester Music; Format: Digital download, streaming
Corporate Composer	Released: 28 November 2025; Label: Manifester; Format: Digital download, streaming

=== Singles ===
==== As lead artist ====
List of singles as lead artist, with selected chart positions
Title	Year	Peak chart positions							Album or EP
Title	Year	AUT	FIN	ICE	IRE	LTU	SWE	UK	Album or EP
"Waiting For"	2018	—	—	—	—	—	—	—	Non-album singles
"What Christmas Is About"	2018	—	—	—	—	—	—	—	Non-album singles
"Collide"	2018	—	—	—	—	—	—	—	Non-album singles
"Sudnji dan"	2020	—	—	—	—	—	—	—	Non-album singles
"Runaway (Stay)" (featuring Ninski)	2021	—	—	—	—	—	—	—	Non-album singles
"Ex Me"	2022	—	—	—	—	—	—	—	Non-album singles
"Mirror Mirror" (with Truu)	2022	—	—	—	—	—	—	—	Non-album singles
"Criminal" (with Bermuda and DJ Spicy)	2022	—	—	—	—	—	—	—	Non-album singles
"Who the Hell Is Edgar?" (with Salena)	2023	4	20	39	67	10	79	48	Ho Ho Ho
"Making Grown Men Cry" (with Truu)	2023	—	—	—	—	—	—	—	Non-album single
"Bye Bye Bye" (with Salena)	2023	—	—	—	—	—	—	—	Ho Ho Ho
"Ho Ho Ho" (with Salena)	2023	—	—	—	—	—	—	—	Ho Ho Ho
"Behind The Scenes"	2024	—	—	—	—	—	—	—	Grandma on the Dancefloor
"Hunger" (with Aiko)	2024	—	—	—	—	—	—	—	Aikonic
"Not Scared of Growing Old"	2024	—	—	—	—	—	—	—	Grandma on the Dancefloor
"To-Do List"	2024	—	—	—	—	—	—	—	Grandma on the Dancefloor
"Jail"	2024	—	—	—	—	—	—	—	Grandma on the Dancefloor
"Immigrant Child"	2024	—	—	—	—	—	—	—	Grandma on the Dancefloor
"Talk That Talk"	2025	—	—	—	—	—	—	—	Corporate Composer
"Bourgeoisie"	2025	—	—	—	—	—	—	—	Corporate Composer
"Girls Like Girls"	2025	—	—	—	—	—	—	—	Corporate Composer
"My Religion" (with Goldielocks)	2025	—	— (Note: "My Religion" did not enter the Suomen virallinen lista, but peaked at number 42 on the Suomen virallinen radiosoittolista, which is a Finnish Airplay chart.)	—	—	— (Note: "My Religion" did not enter the AGATA Singlų Top 100, but peaked at number 50 on the TopHit Lithuanian Airplay.)	—	—	Two of a Kind
"—" denotes a recording that did not chart or was not released in that territory.

=== Other appearances ===
Title	Year	Other artist(s)	Album
"Bite Marks"	2025	—N/a	Welcome to Noxus (Original Soundtrack from League of Legends)

== Notes ==
Awards and achievements
Preceded by Lumix feat. Pia Maria with "Halo"	Austria in the Eurovision Song Contest; 2023; With: Salena	Succeeded by Kaleen with "We Will Rave"
