= Goldielocks =

Finnish and Berlin-based singer and songwriter

- Born: Ella Mäntynen; 14 March 2001 (age 25); Joensuu, Finland
- Genre: Indie pop
- Occupations: Singer; songwriter
- Instrument: Vocals
- Years active: 2020–present
- Label: Sony

Ella Mäntynen (born 14 March 2001), known professionally as Goldielocks and Ella Bine, is a Finnish singer and songwriter. Beginning her musical career in 2020, signing a publishing deal with M-Eazy Music, later signing a recording deal with Sony Music Finland in 2022, Goldielocks released her debut single "Electrifying" in 2023. She first received mainstream recognition with in 2025, after her song "Made Of" competed in Uuden Musiikin Kilpailu 2025, Finland's national selection for the Eurovision Song Contest 2025, where it placed second.

== Early life ==
Goldielocks was born on 14 March 2001 to a family of individuals deeply engaged in music. She began her musical pursuit at an early age, singing and playing the piano as a child. Growing up in Joensuu in the eastern part of Finland, she attended a music-focused school. She also participated in theatre and acting, saying it influenced how she performs her music on stage.

== Career ==
=== 2020–2024: Career beginnings ===
In 2020, Goldielocks signed a publishing deal with Finnish company M-Eazy Music. During this period, she helped write songs for Finnish artists including Gasellit, Isac Elliot, Abreu, and Sara Siipola. A year later in 2021, Goldielocks signed a marketing contract with Comusic Management, allowing her to gain more exposure and recognition for her works.

In 2022, Goldielocks signed a record deal with Sony Music Finland. She continued to help write songs for other artists during this period. In late April 2023, Goldielocks released her debut single "Electrifying". Seven months later, in November 2023, she released her first non-single record, and EP titled "East to South". The record contained five songs and received radio play in Finland and Baltic countries. She performed in Iceland, Italy, and Germany, and also performed at several music festivals in Finland.

=== 2025–present: Uuden Musiikin Kilpailu 2025 and "Made Of" ===
On January 8, 2025, Goldielocks was announced as one of seven (later six due to One Morning Left's disqualification from the competition) finalists for Uuden Musiikin Kilpailu (UMK) 2025, the winner of which would go on to represent Finland at the Eurovision Song Contest 2025. On January 16, Goldielocks's entry "Made Of" was officially released. The song featured lyrics about self-reflection and staying true to one's self.

On February 8, 2025, Goldielocks performed in the final at Nokia Arena in Tampere. Unable to perform live vocals due to a vocal strain, as advised by a doctor, she went on perform her set live using pre-recorded vocals from her rehearsals. Goldielocks would go on to win the jury vote (UMK uses a 25/75 international jury/audience split) with 74 points, but place second in the audience vote with 229 points. She ultimately placed second (with a grand total of 303 points) to Erika Vikman's "Ich Komme", who garnered 430 points.

== Discography ==
=== Studio albums ===
Title	Details	Peak chart positions
Title	Details	FIN
Two of a Kind	Released: 24 October 2025; Label: Sony Music Finland; Format: Vinyl, Digital download, streaming	5

=== EPs ===
Title	Details
East to South	Released: 24 October 2023; Label: Sony Music Finland; Format: Digital download, streaming

=== Singles ===
List of singles, with selected chart positions
Title	Year	Peak chart positions			Album
Title	Year	FIN	FIN Air.	LTU Air.	Album
"Electrifying"	2023	—	—	—	East to South
"Angeline"	2023	—	—	—	East to South
"American Wedding" (featuring Svegliaginevra)	2023	—	—	—	East to South
"Live Again"	2024	—	—	—	Two of a Kind
"Mercy"	2024	—	—	—	Two of a Kind
"Provocateur"	2024	—	—	—	Two of a Kind
"Made Of"	2025	6	2	—	Two of a Kind
"Push Back My Alarm"	2025	—	12	—	Two of a Kind
"Favorite Girl"	2025	—	—	—	Two of a Kind
"My Religion" (with Teya)	2025	—	42	50	Two of a Kind
"Rush"	2026	—	84	—	TBA
"Don't Let It Get to You"	2026	—	—	—	TBA
"—" denotes a recording that did not chart or was not released in that territory.

==== As featured artist ====
Title	Year	Album
"Out of Time" (BbyBites featuring Goldielocks)	2025	Bby's Corner
