= Who the Hell Is Edgar? =

2023 song by Teya & Salena

Single by Teya and Salena
- Language: English, Italian
- Released: 8 March 2023
- Genre: Pop; dance-pop; electropop; eurodisco; dance; synth-pop
- Length: 2:39
- Label: Warner Music Germany
- Songwriters: Teodora Špirić; Selina-Maria Edbauer; Ronald Janeček; Pele Loriano
- Producers: Ronald Janeček; Pele Loriano

Teya and Salena singles chronology
"Who the Hell Is Edgar?" (2023)	"Bye Bye Bye" (2023)

Music video
- "Who the Hell Is Edgar?" on YouTube

Eurovision Song Contest 2023 entry
- Country: Austria
- Artists: Teya & Salena
- Language: English
- Composers: Teodora Špirić; Selina-Maria Edbauer; Ronald Janeček; Pele Loriano
- Lyricists: Teodora Špirić; Selina-Maria Edbauer; Ronald Janeček; Pele Loriano

Finals performance
- Semi-final result: 2nd
- Semi-final points: 137
- Final result: 15th
- Final points: 120

Entry chronology
- ◄ "Halo" (2022)
- "We Will Rave" (2024) ►

Official performance video
- "Who the Hell Is Edgar?" (Second Semi-Final) on YouTube "Who the Hell Is Edgar?" (Grand Final) on YouTube

"Who the Hell Is Edgar?" is a song by Austrian singers Teya and Salena. It was written by both vocalists of the song along with Ronald Janeček and Pele Loriano, and was released on 8 March 2023 through Warner Music Germany. The song represented Austria in the Eurovision Song Contest 2023, where it finished in 15th at the final with 120 points.

"Who the Hell is Edgar?" is described as a satire of the music industry, with it addressing measly wages per stream on online platforms and gender discrimination in the industry against women, connecting it to the recognition of American writer Edgar Allan Poe's work during his lifespan. It was well received by Eurovision and international media critics, praising the song's message and its musical composition. The song drew commercial success, peaking within the top five in the Netherlands along with its native country of Austria.

== Background and composition ==
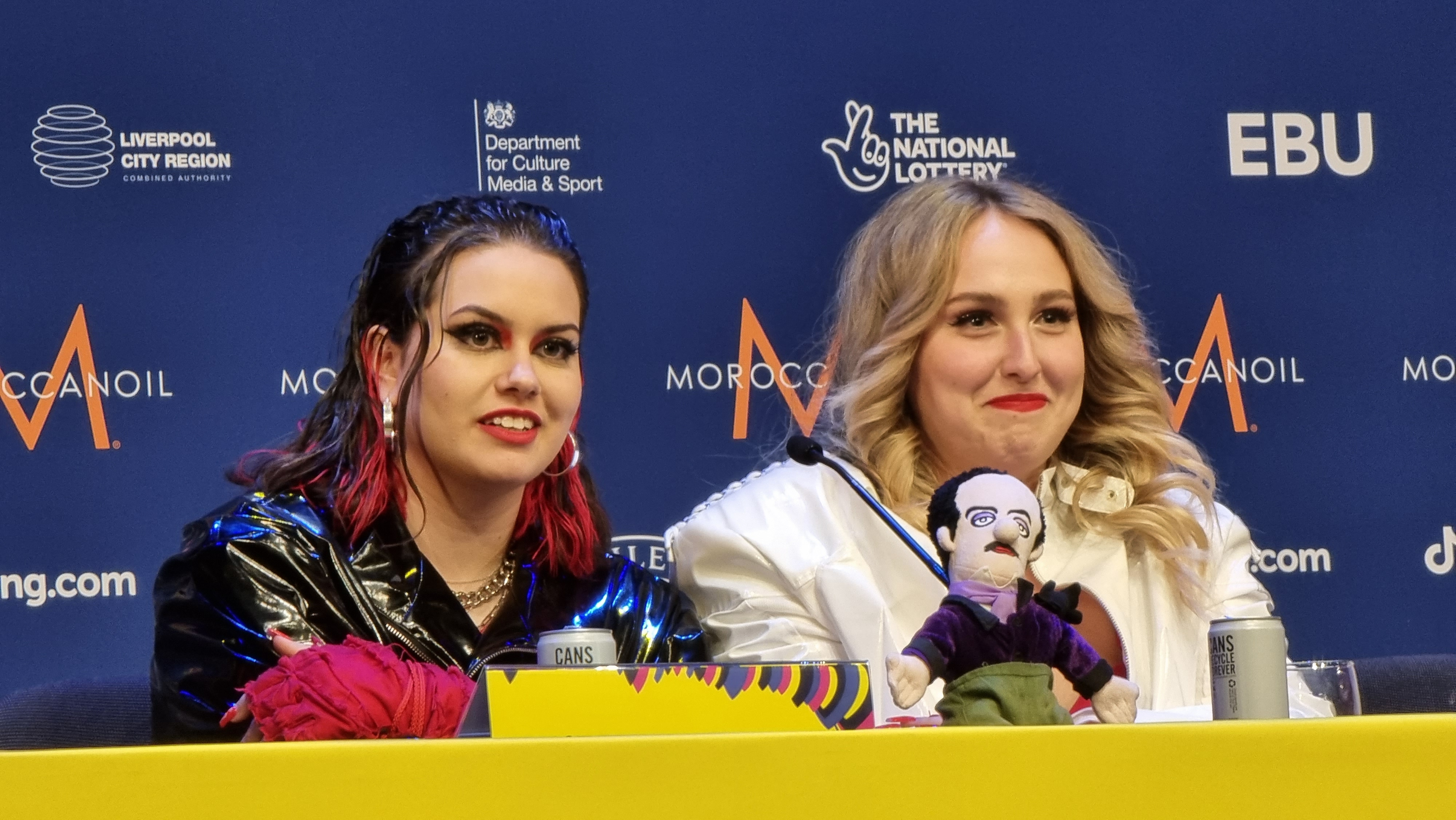
Teya and Salena in 2023.

"Who the Hell Is Edgar?" was written by Teodora Špirić (known professionally as Teya), Selina–Maria Edbauer (known professionally as Salena), Ronald Janeček, and Pele Loriano. Teya and Salena met each other during the production of Austrian television talent show Starmania, 18 months prior to writing "Who the Hell Is Edgar?". The song was composed at a songwriting camp in the Czech Republic in 2022 to write a song for Salena to enter into the Eurovision Song Contest, with the initial version of the song including swear words in the song's first verses. The swears were removed as the writers thought the word hell "translate[d] the message more". Writing for "Who the Hell Is Edgar?" started with an hour left in the camp, and was chosen because it was "the best song of the day" according to Teya. The duo chose to reference American writer Edgar Allan Poe because of an experience a personal friend of theirs, Norwegian singer Elsie Bay, went through the night before writing the song. Teya described the experience as "when you write a really good song... and it doesn't feel like your work." Salena later stated in a press conference that it represented "a snapshot of the fun we had writing it... Sometimes creativity rushes through you like you're possessed by a ghost."

The song is regarded as a satire of the music industry and is inspired by experiences both Teya and Salena have faced as women in the music industry. Inspiration also came from the phenomenon of groups of female poetry writers from the 1850s and 1860s who wrote poems that attempted to emulate Poe's writings, believing that the spirit of Poe had possessed them. Within the song's lyrics, it mocks aspects of the music industry. The duo, who within "Who the Hell is Edgar?" write a song which they believe will make them rich, end up ghostwriting it using the alias of Edgar Allan Poe to poke fun at the idea that "he's a man. We, as female songwriters, can't make it without a man doing it for us." References to the payout of $0.003 per stream via music streaming services are mentioned, displaying a songwriter's lack of stable income. Eventually realising their total payout even if the song became a hit would be minimal, they resign to the fact that they can only afford "gas station champagne", stating that "Edgar can not pay rent for me". The lyrics bear a resemblance to Poe's life, who despite achieving literary success, earned little from his work and died impoverished, with Poe's works being plagiarised by others.

== Release and promotion ==
Over a month before its official release, a Twitter account named Crystal Ball ESC leaked a 15-second snippet of the song. The duo said they were left distraught and crying due to the low sound quality of the snippet, which they compared to "someone recording [the snippet] on a toaster." The song was officially released on 8 March 2023, premiering on Ö3 radio show Ö3-Wecker.

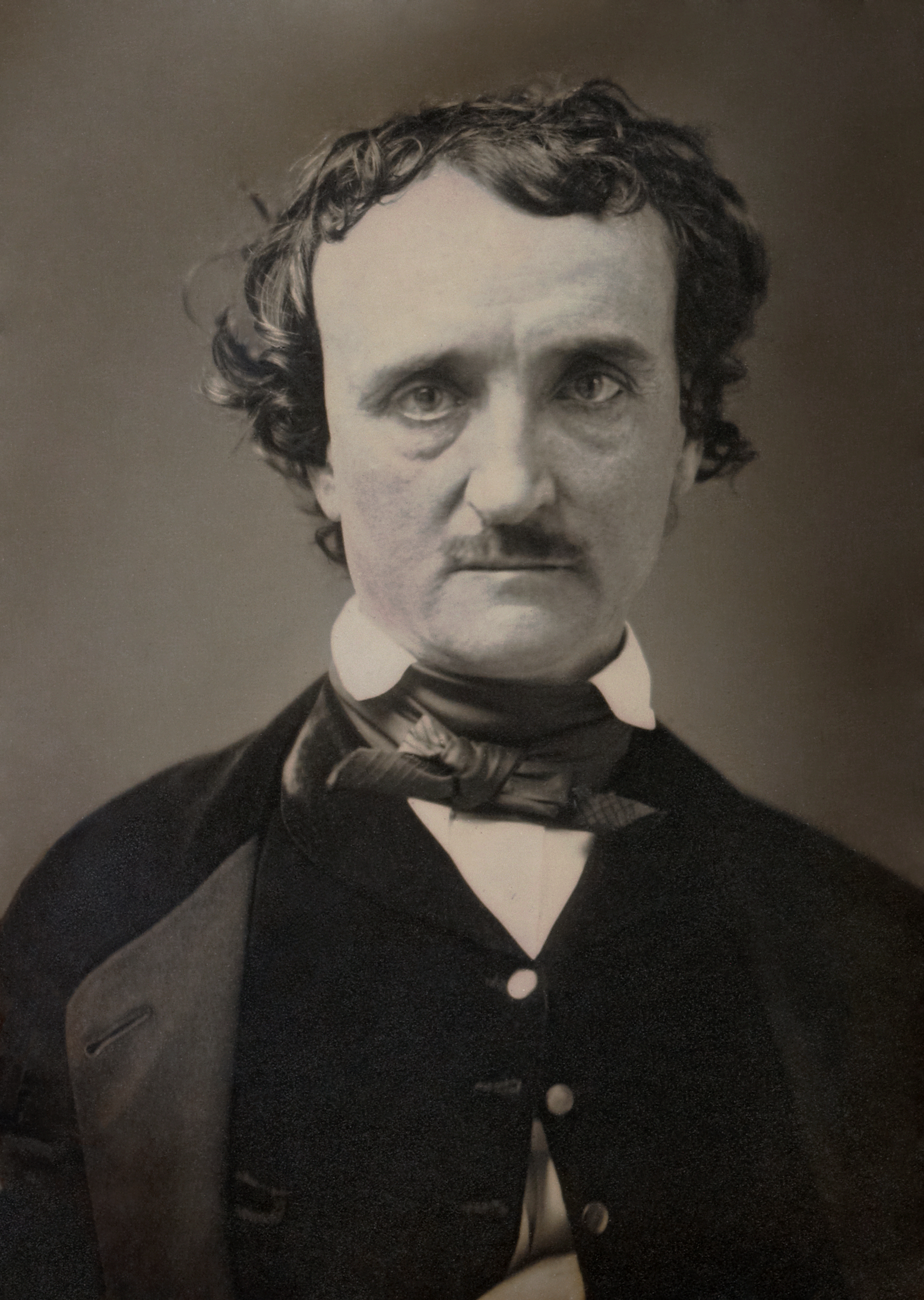
American writer Edgar Allan Poe (pictured in 1849) is referenced heavily within the song and its accompanying music video.

Along with the song's official release, an accompanying music video directed by Ruy Okamura was released on the same day. The video takes place within an office complex, decorated with posters and items referencing Edgar Allan Poe and his works, including The Raven and The Masque of the Red Death. Within the video's storyline, the duo act as office workers for a record company, creating a song that is noticed by the bosses of the company. Disguising themselves as men to a group of businessmen in a room where "creativity is downplayed and business decisions are paramount", the duo are arrested after the secretary snitches about the duo's real identities, leaving the two realising that creativity did not work to advance their careers. Despite this, the duo escape from jail and leave in a red car; in an analysis article by writer Jessica Doyle, the scene represented the duo having "discovered that the secret to the creativity lay with them and their femininity".

To further promote the song, the duo confirmed their intent to participate in various Eurovision pre-parties throughout the months of March and April, including the Barcelona Eurovision Party on 25 March, Pre-Party ES 2023 on 8 April, Eurovision in Concert on 15 April, and the London Eurovision Party on 16 April. The duo also performed a live acoustic version of the song at the studios of Ö3 as part of a farewell ceremony before the duo left for the Eurovision Song Contest on 25 April.

== Critical reception ==
"Who the Hell Is Edgar?" was largely well received. In a Wiwibloggs review containing reviews from several critics, the song was rated 8.44 out of 10 points, coming third out of 37 songs on the site's annual ranking. Another review conducted by ESC Bubble that contained reviews from a combination of readers and juries rated the song first out of the 15 songs in the Eurovision semi-final "Who the Hell Is Edgar?" was in. ESC Beat's Doron Lahav ranked the song eighth overall out of the 37 entries competing in Eurovision 2023, writing that the song was complex, adding later that it was "incredibly catchy". A ranking containing reviews from three BuzzFeed editors ranked the song fifth overall, earning a total of 22.5 out of a possible 30 points. Vulture's Jon O'Brien ranked the song second overall, describing the song as a "thumping Eurodance" track that was "the sort of gimmicky nonsense that only really works in the confines of Eurovision."

National Public Radio's Glen Weldon ranked the song third in his top ten for Eurovision 2023, praising the chorus along with the song's message. The Guardian's Ben Beaumont–Thomas included the song in his "14 songs to listen out for at Eurovision 2023" list, also praising the song's chorus. The Times' Jonathan Dean described the song as a "postmodern earworm". The Irish Times' Patrick Freyne stated that the song was "arguably more Edgar Allan Partridge than Poe, but it's also magnificent." Die Presse's Klemens Patek wrote that while the song had "a good beat, a catchy chorus, and a message", he thought that the song had "minimal" chances of winning the contest.

== Eurovision Song Contest ==
=== Internal selection ===
On 9 June 2022, Österreichischer Rundfunk (ORF) announced its intent to participate in the 67th edition of the Eurovision Song Contest, utilizing an internal selection to select their representative and song. The internal selection was split into two rounds: an initial live casting round consisting of 15 artists followed by a round consisting of three shortlisted songs, with a jury panel selecting the entry. On 31 January 2023, Teya and Salena were officially announced as Austria's representatives for Eurovision 2023 on Ö3 radio show Ö3-Wecker.

=== At Eurovision ===
The Eurovision Song Contest 2023 took place at the Liverpool Arena in Liverpool, United Kingdom, and consisted of two semi-finals held on the respective dates of 9 and 11 May, and the final on 13 May 2023. During the allocation draw on 31 January 2023, Austria was drawn to compete in the second semi-final, performing in the second half of the show. The duo were later drawn to perform 13th in the semi-final, ahead of San Marino's Piqued Jacks and before Albania's Albina Kelmendi.

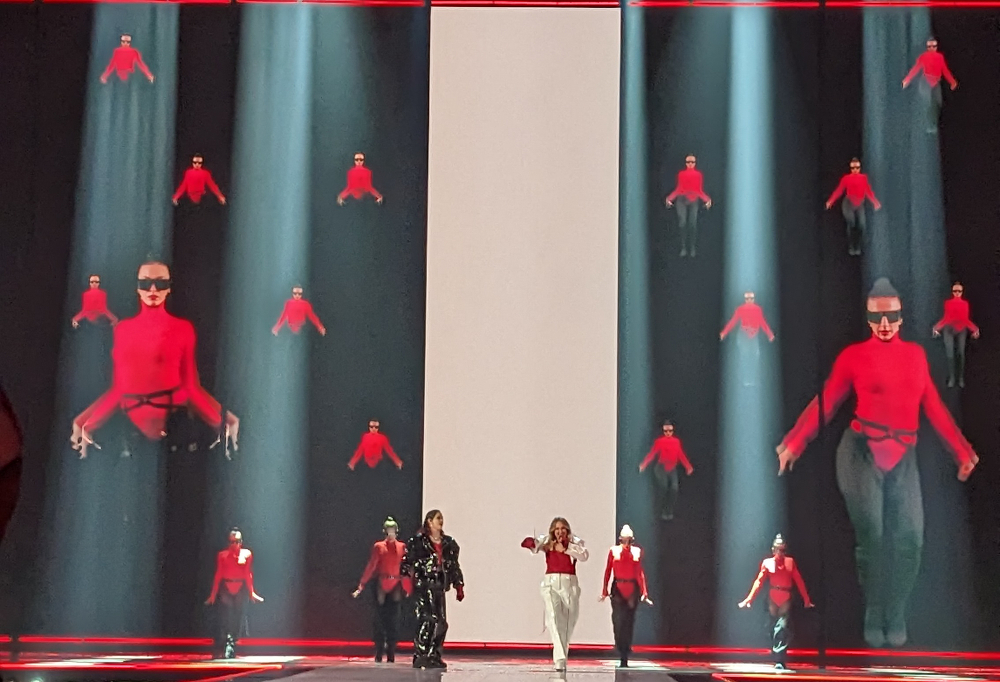
The duo performing "Who the Hell Is Edgar?" at a Eurovision 2023 jury final.

For the Eurovision performance of "Who the Hell is Edgar?", Austrian choreographer Marvin Dietmann was appointed as the creative director. The performance featured the duo both wearing red-coloured base outfits designed by Johann Erhardt and Maximilian d’Antonio, with Teya wearing a black leather jacket and Salena wearing a white top. In interviews, Teya stated that the outfits were designed to "reflect both our personalities". Accompanied by four backing dancers, all six performers perform a choreographed dance during the performance. LEDs showed displays of the four backing dancers along with occasional shots of Edgar Allan Poe. "Who the Hell Is Edgar?" finished in second, receiving 137 points and securing a spot in the grand final.

The performance received mixed reactions. The Daily Telegraph's Ed Power, who criticised the majority of the second semi-final, stated that "the dreariness [of the semi-final] was truly banished just once, by Austria's Teya and Salena... They were essentially Wet Leg spliced with Kraftwerk... That's what you want from Eurovision." i's Michael Chakraverty wrote that the performance was "One of the best performances of the evening... It shouldn't have worked, but it absolutely did... the song featured had addictive bass-heavy chorus and a surprising operatic bridge which tied the whole thing together." In contrast, Die Presse's Klemens Patek praised the vocal abilities of the duo and the performance's crowd participation but also criticised the choreography, wanting the choreography from the song's music video instead. An opinion piece published by Der Standard lambasted the duo's outfits, stating that they "certainly doesn't mean the streets of Vienna. Rather, it means those in Berlin... Teya and Salena [are] on their way to the Kit Kat Club."

The duo performed a repeat of their performance in the grand final on 13 May. The song was performed first in the final, before Portugal's Mimicat. After the results were announced, they finished in 15th with 120 points, with a split result of 104 points from the juries and 16 points from televoting. Regarding the former, the song received a single set of the maximum 12 points from Belgium. It received no sets of 12 points from the televote; the maximum given within the category was a set of seven points from Australia. The duo were satisfied with the result, with Teya stating to Kronen Zeitung, "Our goal was to get to the final. And we did it... We opened the biggest music show ever - and were able to enjoy it afterwards. Our dream has simply come true."

== Charts ==
Chart performance for "Who the Hell is Edgar?"
Chart (2023)	Peak position
Australia Digital Tracks (ARIA)	43
Austria (Ö3 Austria Top 40)	4
Finland (Suomen virallinen lista)	20
Greece International (IFPI)	26
Iceland (Tónlistinn)	12
Ireland (IRMA)	67
Lithuania (AGATA)	10
Netherlands (Single Tip)	2
Poland (Polish Streaming Top 100)	51
Sweden (Sverigetopplistan)	79
UK Singles (Official Charts)	48

== Release history ==
Release history and format for "Who the Hell Is Edgar?"
Country	Date	Format(s)	Label	Ref.
Various	8 March 2023	Digital download; streaming	Warner Music Germany	
