= We Will Rave =

2024 song by Kaleen

Single by Kaleen
- Released: 1 March 2024
- Genre: Eurodance; techno
- Length: 3:05
- Label: Warner
- Songwriters: Anderz Wrethov; Jimmy "Joker" Thörnfeldt; Julie Aagaard; Thomas Stengaard
- Producers: Anderz Wrethov; Jimmy "Joker" Thörnfeldt; Thomas Stengaard

Kaleen singles chronology
"Taking Chances" (2023)	"We Will Rave" (2024)	"It Feels So Good" (2024)

Music video
- "We Will Rave" on YouTube

Alternative covers
- Original cover

Eurovision Song Contest 2024 entry
- Country: Austria
- Artist: Kaleen
- Language: English

Finals performance
- Semi-final result: 9th
- Semi-final points: 46
- Final result: 24th
- Final points: 24

Entry chronology
- ◄ "Who the Hell Is Edgar?" (2023)
- "Wasted Love" (2025) ►

Official performance video
- "We Will Rave" (Second Semi-Final) on YouTube "We Will Rave" (Grand Final) on YouTube

"We Will Rave" is the major-label debut single by Austrian singer Kaleen. It was released on 1 March 2024 by Warner Music Central Europe. Self-described as a "techno-inspired pop track", it was written by Anderz Wrethov, Jimmy Thörnfeldt, Julie Aagaard, and Thomas Stengaard. The song represented Austria in the Eurovision Song Contest 2024, where it placed 24th and second-last with 24 points at the grand final.

== Background and composition ==
"We Will Rave" was written and composed by Anderz Wrethov, Jimmy Thörnfeldt, Julie Aagaard, and Thomas Stengaard. Kaleen described the song as a "techno-inspired pop track" before the song's release. Upon the song's release, Kaleen stated that the image of a rave party in the song was used to promote a place where "outsiders and wounded souls go to heal and dissolve their problems through music".

She was officially announced as Austria's representative for the Eurovision Song Contest 2024 on 16 January 2024 on Ö3-Wecker, a radio show on Hitradio Ö3. On 23 February, Kaleen published a 30-second snippet of the song to promote it. The demo of the song was leaked several weeks before the song's official release; Kaleen claims that the final version was changed to conform better with Eurovision. The song was officially released on 1 March.

== Music video and promotion ==
Along with the song's release, an accompanying music video was released on 4 March. It was originally slated to be released three days earlier to correlate with the song's official release; however, according to Kaleen, the release was delayed because the company that produced the video could not finish it on time. To further promote the song, she announced her intent to participate in various Eurovision pre-parties throughout the months of March and April 2024, including Pre-Party ES 2024 on 30 March, the London Eurovision Party 2024 on 7 April, Eurovision in Concert 2024 on 13 April, and the Nordic Eurovision Party 2024 on 14 April. She also performed the song during a broadcast on 28 April for the televised Austrian show Die große Chance.

== Critical reception ==
"We Will Rave" has received mixed to positive reception. In a Wiwibloggs review containing several reviews from several critics, the song was rated 7.7 out of 10 points, earning sixth out of the 37 songs competing in the Eurovision Song Contest 2024 on the site's annual ranking. Another review conducted by ESC Bubble that contained reviews from a combination of readers and juries rated the song ninth out of the 16 songs "We Will Rave" was competing against in its the Eurovision semi-final. Jon O'Brien, a writer for Vulture, ranked it first out of all songs competing, deeming it a "relentless club banger", praising the fusion of musical styles within the song. ESC Beat's Doron Lahav ranked the song 15th out of 37, stating that while the song's production was "polished", he thought that the song would be difficult to sing live. Scotsman writer Erin Adam gave the song a neutral review, rating the song six points out of 10. The i Paper categorised the song among the bad ones, calling it "something we’ve seen a million times on the Eurovision stage. It’s not boring by any stretch of the imagination… but it’s not exactly good, either."

== Eurovision Song Contest ==
=== Internal selection ===
Austria's broadcaster for the Eurovision Song Contest, Österreichischer Rundfunk (ORF), officially announced their intentions to participate in the Eurovision Song Contest 2024 on 14 June 2023, deciding their representative via an internal selection. A shortlist of 14 artists were judged by a jury and Eurovision fan clubs. Although an announcement was expected in December, this was delayed by a month. On 16 January 2024, Kaleen was announced as Austria's representative for the Eurovision Song Contest 2024.

=== At Eurovision ===
The Eurovision Song Contest 2024 took place at the Malmö Arena in Malmö, Sweden, and consisted of two semi-finals held on the respective dates of 7 and 9 May and the final on 11 May 2024. During the allocation draw on 30 January 2024, Austria was drawn to compete in the second semi-final, performing in the first half of the show. She was later drawn to perform sixth in the semi-final, ahead of the Czech Republic's Aiko and behind Denmark's Saba.

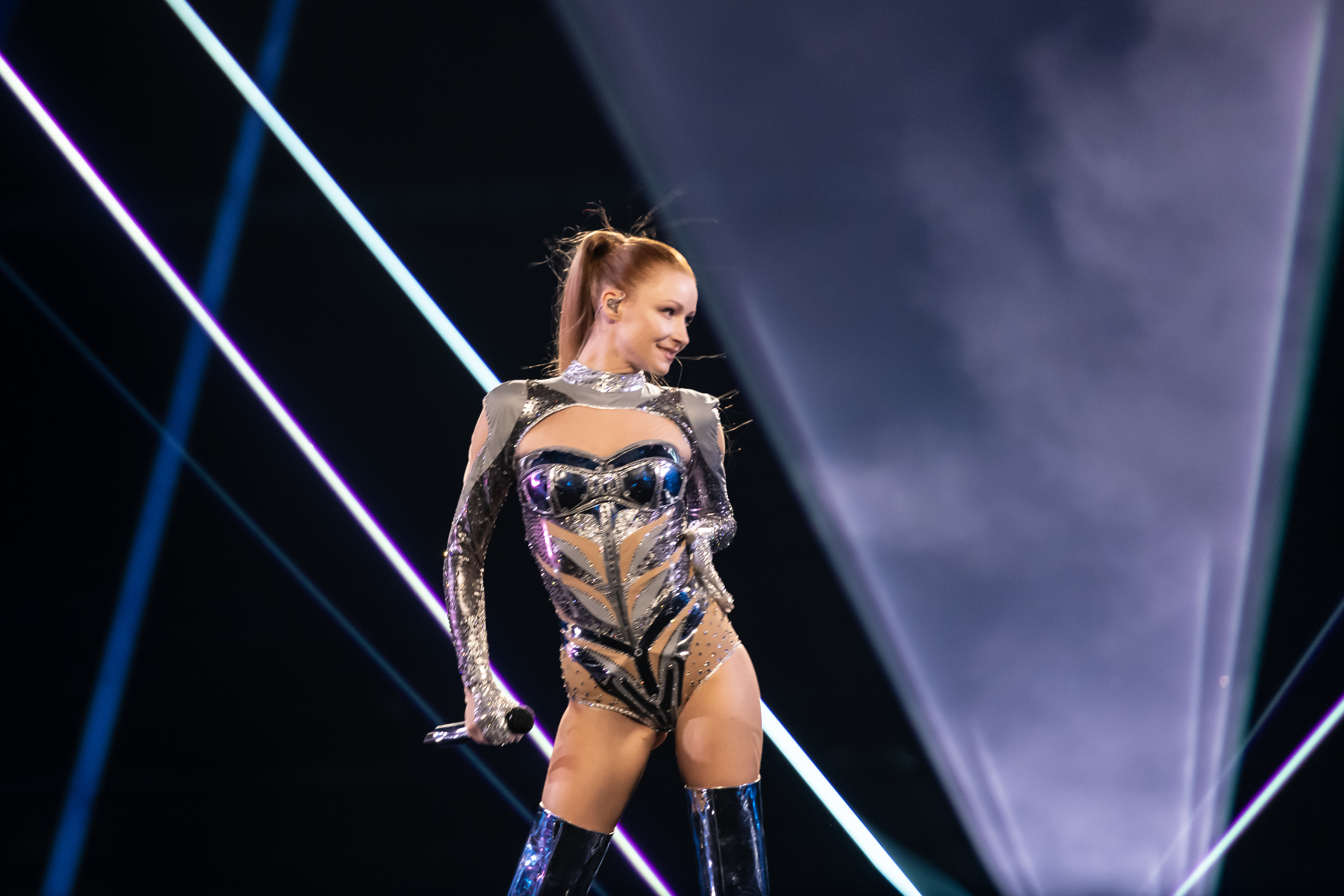
Kreissl performing "We Will Rave" at a dress rehearsal (with already changed costume) before the second semi-final of Eurovision 2024.

For its Eurovision performance, Dan Shipton was appointed as the creative director. Before the contest, Kreissl claimed that the performance's staging would implement a toned down version of the "sexy" aesthetic featured in the music video. The performance was intended to feature Kreissl in a Marina Hoermanseder-designed black mesh bodysuit adorned with around 150,000 crystals provided by Swarovski. However, the costume was changed before the contest into another by a different designer, but still combined with a coat by Hoermanseder. This got criticized by Hoermanseder after the contest.

Kaleen was also accompanied by four backing dancers wearing black cargo pants, along with a large inverted pyramid prop that shoots lasers in multiple colours. "We Will Rave" was able to secure a position in the grand final, finishing ninth with 46 points. Kaleen performed a repeat of her performance in the grand final on 11 May. The song was slated as the closing act for the grand final, performing in 26th, following France's Slimane. After the results were announced, she finished in 24th with 24 points, with a split score of 19 points from juries (20th place) and five points from televoting (23rd place). Regarding the former, no sets of the maximum 12 points were given by any country; the maximum given was a set of seven points given by Israel. The maximum given via televote was a set of three points, also given by Israel. In response to her finish, Kaleen stated that she was "not disappointed at all", instead praising that she was able to perform at the contest in the first place.

== Charts ==
Chart performance for "We Will Rave"
Chart (2024)	Peak position
Austria (Ö3 Austria Top 40)	18
Greece International (IFPI)	29
Lithuania (AGATA)	30
Netherlands (Single Tip)	15
Sweden Heatseeker (Sverigetopplistan)	3
Switzerland (Schweizer Hitparade)	75
UK Singles Downloads (Official Charts)	23
UK Singles Sales (OCC)	23

== Release history ==
Release history and formats for "We Will Rave"
Country	Date	Format(s)	Label	Ref.
Various	1 March 2024	Digital download; streaming	Warner Music Central Europe	
