= Austria in the Eurovision Song Contest 2021 =

- Eurovision Song Contest 2021
- Participating broadcaster: Österreichischer Rundfunk (ORF)
- Country: Austria
- Selection process: Internal selection
- Announcement date: Artist: 26 March 2020; Song: 10 March 2021

Competing entry
- Song: "Amen"
- Artist: Vincent Bueno
- Songwriters: Tobias Carshey; Ashley Hicklin; Jonas Thander

Placement
- Semi-final result: Failed to qualify (12th)

Participation chronology

Austria was represented at the Eurovision Song Contest 2021 with the song "Amen" written by Tobias Carshey, Ashley Hicklin and Jonas Thander. The song was performed by Vincent Bueno. On 26 March 2020, the Austrian broadcaster Österreichischer Rundfunk (ORF) announced that they had internally selected Vincent Bueno to compete at the 2021 contest in Rotterdam, the Netherlands after he was due to compete in the 2020 contest with "Alive" before the event's cancellation, while "Amen" was presented to the public on 10 March 2021.

Austria was drawn to compete in the second semi-final of the Eurovision Song Contest which took place on 20 May 2021. Performing during the show in position 5, "Amen" was not announced among the top 10 entries of the second semi-final and therefore did not qualify to compete in the final. It was later revealed that Austria placed twelfth out of the 17 participating countries in the semi-final with 66 points.

== Background ==
Prior to the 2021 contest, Austria has participated in the Eurovision Song Contest fifty-two times since its first entry in 1957. The nation has won the contest on two occasions: in 1966 with the song "Merci, Chérie" performed by Udo Jürgens and in 2014 with the song "Rise Like a Phoenix" performed by Conchita Wurst. Following the introduction of semi-finals for the 2004 contest, Austria has featured in only seven finals. Austria's least successful result has been last place, which they have achieved on eight occasions, most recently in 2012. Austria has also received nul points on four occasions; in 1962, 1988, 1991 and 2015.

The Austrian national broadcaster, Österreichischer Rundfunk (ORF), broadcasts the event within Austria and organises the selection process for the nation's entry. ORF confirmed their intentions to participate at the 2021 Eurovision Song Contest on 26 March 2020. From 2011 to 2013 as well as in 2015 and 2016, ORF set up national finals with several artists to choose both the song and performer to compete at Eurovision for Austria, with both the public and a panel of jury members involved in the selection. In 2014 and since 2017, ORF has held an internal selection to choose the artist and song to represent Austria at the contest.

== Before Eurovision ==
=== Internal selection ===
On 26 March 2020, ORF confirmed that Vincent Bueno would remain as Austria's representative for the Eurovision Song Contest 2021. Several songs, two of them titled "Dumb Human Bias" and "Parachute", were submitted by Bueno and shortlisted by the ORF Eurovision Song Contest Team, which collaborated with music expert Eberhard Forcher who worked on the selection of the Austrian entries since 2016. On 26 February 2021, the song "Amen" written by Tobias Carshey, Ashley Hicklin and Jonas Thander was announced by ORF as the Austrian entry for the Eurovision Song Contest 2021. The presentation of the song took place on 10 March 2021 during the radio show Ö3-Wecker, aired on Ö3.

=== Promotion ===
Prior to the contest, Vincent Bueno specifically promoted "Amen" as the Austrian Eurovision entry on 30 April 2021 by performing during the final of the talent show Starmania 21 on ORF 1.

== At Eurovision ==
According to Eurovision rules, all nations with the exceptions of the host country and the "Big Five" (France, Germany, Italy, Spain and the United Kingdom) are required to qualify from one of two semi-finals in order to compete for the final; the top ten countries from each semi-final progress to the final. The European Broadcasting Union (EBU) split up the competing countries into six different pots based on voting patterns from previous contests, with countries with favourable voting histories put into the same pot. The semi-final allocation draw held for the Eurovision Song Contest 2020 on 28 January 2020 was used for the 2021 contest, which Austria was placed into the second semi-final, to be held on 20 May 2021, and was scheduled to perform in the first half of the show.

Once all the competing songs for the 2021 contest had been released, the running order for the semi-finals was decided by the shows' producers rather than through another draw, so that similar songs were not placed next to each other. Austria was set to perform in position 5, following the entry from Greece and before the entry from Poland.

The two semi-finals and the final were broadcast in Austria on ORF 1 with commentary by Andi Knoll. The Austrian spokesperson, who announced the top 12-point score awarded by the Austrian jury during the final, was Philipp Hansa.

=== Semi-final ===
Austria performed fifth in the second semi-final, following the entry from Greece and preceding the entry from Poland. At the end of the show, Austria was not announced among the top 10 entries in the second semi-final and therefore failed to qualify to compete in the final. It was later revealed that Austria placed twelfth in the semi-final, receiving a total of 66 points: 13 points from the televoting and 53 points from the juries.

=== Voting ===
Voting during the three shows involved each country awarding two sets of points from 1-8, 10 and 12: one from their professional jury and the other from televoting. Each nation's jury consisted of five music industry professionals who are citizens of the country they represent, with a diversity in gender and age represented. The judges assess each entry based on the performances during the second Dress Rehearsal of each show, which takes place the night before each live show, against a set of criteria including: vocal capacity; the stage performance; the song's composition and originality; and the overall impression by the act. Jury members may only take part in panel once every three years, and are obliged to confirm that they are not connected to any of the participating acts in a way that would impact their ability to vote impartially. Jury members should also vote independently, with no discussion of their vote permitted with other jury members. The exact composition of the professional jury, and the results of each country's jury and televoting were released after the grand final; the individual results from each jury member were also released in an anonymised form.

Below is a breakdown of points awarded to Austria and awarded by Austria in the second semi-final and grand final of the contest, and the breakdown of the jury voting and televoting conducted during the two shows:

==== Points awarded to Austria ====
Points awarded to Austria (Semi-final 2)
Score	Televote	Jury
12 points		
10 points		
8 points		
7 points		Albania; Switzerland
6 points		Bulgaria; Spain
5 points		Finland; Georgia
4 points	Denmark; Switzerland	Estonia; Iceland
3 points	Albania	Denmark; Serbia
2 points	Iceland	Portugal
1 point		Latvia

==== Points awarded by Austria ====
Points awarded by Austria (Semi-final 2)
Score	Televote	Jury
12 points	Serbia	Switzerland
10 points	Iceland	Iceland
8 points	Switzerland	Bulgaria
7 points	Portugal	Portugal
6 points	Moldova	Serbia
5 points	Finland	Finland
4 points	Bulgaria	Denmark
3 points	Denmark	Albania
2 points	Albania	Moldova
1 point	Poland	San Marino

Points awarded by Austria (Final)
Score	Televote	Jury
12 points	Serbia	Iceland
10 points	Iceland	Switzerland
8 points	Italy	France
7 points	Ukraine	Portugal
6 points	France	Italy
5 points	Switzerland	Bulgaria
4 points	Finland	Malta
3 points	Lithuania	Netherlands
2 points	Malta	Germany
1 point	Norway	Finland

==== Detailed voting results ====
The following members comprised the Austrian jury:

- Virginia Ernst
- Gabriela Horn (Pænda)
- Peter Pansky
- Drew Sarich
- Norbert Schneider

Detailed voting results from Austria (Semi-final 2)
R/O	Country	Jury							Televote	
R/O	Country	Juror A	Juror B	Juror C	Juror D	Juror E	Rank	Points	Rank	Points
01	San Marino	12	8	7	10	10	10	1	14	
02	Estonia	14	10	13	12	13	13		11	
03	Czech Republic	6	12	12	11	11	12		15	
04	Greece	8	9	8	14	12	11		13	
05	Austria									
06	Poland	16	14	15	13	15	15		10	1
07	Moldova	9	11	11	5	14	9	2	5	6
08	Iceland	3	2	1	4	2	2	10	2	10
09	Serbia	4	5	6	9	7	5	6	1	12
10	Georgia	15	15	16	15	16	16		12	
11	Albania	10	6	9	8	8	8	3	9	2
12	Portugal	2	4	4	1	6	4	7	4	7
13	Bulgaria	1	3	3	3	3	3	8	7	4
14	Finland	13	7	5	6	5	6	5	6	5
15	Latvia	11	16	14	16	9	14		16	
16	Switzerland	7	1	2	2	1	1	12	3	8
17	Denmark	5	13	10	7	4	7	4	8	3

Detailed voting results from Austria (Final)
R/O	Country	Jury							Televote	
R/O	Country	Juror A	Juror B	Juror C	Juror D	Juror E	Rank	Points	Rank	Points
01	Cyprus	15	25	13	9	21	16		20	
02	Albania	22	24	25	19	18	26		13	
03	Israel	16	12	14	17	20	19		18	
04	Belgium	20	17	16	10	14	17		21	
05	Russia	17	20	23	3	12	11		12	
06	Malta	3	6	8	22	11	7	4	9	2
07	Portugal	6	4	4	1	5	4	7	14	
08	Serbia	18	11	19	18	10	14		1	12
09	United Kingdom	14	15	26	21	19	20		26	
10	Greece	12	21	12	13	25	18		19	
11	Switzerland	4	2	2	4	4	2	10	6	5
12	Iceland	1	5	1	8	3	1	12	2	10
13	Spain	8	23	15	12	13	12		25	
14	Moldova	23	22	22	11	26	21		24	
15	Germany	5	9	18	26	7	9	2	15	
16	Finland	9	10	7	15	8	10	1	7	4
17	Bulgaria	2	3	9	7	9	6	5	11	
18	Lithuania	21	13	11	14	15	15		8	3
19	Ukraine	25	14	21	25	16	23		4	7
20	France	7	1	5	6	2	3	8	5	6
21	Azerbaijan	19	19	24	20	22	25		17	
22	Norway	26	18	6	16	24	13		10	1
23	Netherlands	10	8	10	5	6	8	3	23	
24	Italy	11	7	3	2	1	5	6	3	8
25	Sweden	24	16	20	23	17	24		16	
26	San Marino	13	26	17	24	23	22		22	
