= Butterfly Tree/Vital Signs =

Single by Excuse Me Moses

from the album 1st Last Will
- Released: May 11, 2007 (Austria)
- Genre: Pop rock, rock
- Label: Universal Music
- Songwriter(s): Michal Bandak (Butterfly Tree)
- Producer(s): Alexander Kahr

Excuse Me Moses singles chronology
"Not in Love Anymore" (2006)	"Butterfly Tree/Vital Signs" (2007)

"Butterfly Tree/Vital Signs" is the third single by the Austrian rock band Excuse Me Moses. It was released on May 11, 2007, and peaked #20 in the Ö3 Austria Top 40. It is their second single which was able to reach the charts after "Summer Sun" in 2006. The single was produced by Alexander Kahr, who was also successful with the Austrian music acts Christina Stürmer and Luttenberger*Klug.

== Music video ==
In the music video of "Butterfly Tree", the band is sitting near some digs, playing the song with acoustic guitars. In between those sequences, there are some images of a barbecue-like party with some friends.

== Maxi CD ==
1. "Butterfly Tree"
2. "Vital Signs"
3. "Butterfly Tree" (Karaoke Version)
4. "Vital Signs" (Karaoke Version)

== Charts ==
Year	Albums	A
2007	Butterfly Tree/Vital Signs	20
