= Austria in the Eurovision Song Contest 2019 =

- Eurovision Song Contest 2019
- Participating broadcaster: Österreichischer Rundfunk (ORF)
- Country: Austria
- Selection process: Internal selection
- Announcement date: Artist: 29 January 2019; Song: 8 March 2019

Competing entry
- Song: "Limits"
- Artist: Paenda
- Songwriters: Paenda

Placement
- Semi-final result: Failed to qualify (17th)

Participation chronology

Austria was represented at the Eurovision Song Contest 2019 with the song "Limits" written and performed by Paenda. On 29 January 2019, the Austrian broadcaster Österreichischer Rundfunk (ORF) announced that they had internally selected Pænda to compete at the 2019 contest in Tel Aviv, Israel, while "Limits" was presented to the public on 8 March 2019.

Austria was drawn to compete in the second semi-final of the Eurovision Song Contest which took place on 16 May 2019. Performing during the show in position 9, "Limits" was not announced among the top 10 entries of the second semi-final and therefore did not qualify to compete in the final. It was later revealed that Austria placed seventeenth out of the 18 participating countries in the semi-final with 21 points.

== Background ==
Prior to the 2019 contest, Austria has participated in the Eurovision Song Contest fifty-one times since its first entry in 1957. The nation had won the contest on two occasions: in 1966 with the song "Merci, Chérie" performed by Udo Jürgens and in 2014 with the song "Rise Like a Phoenix" performed by Conchita Wurst. Following the introduction of semi-finals for the 2004 contest, Austria has featured in only seven finals. Austria's least successful result has been last place, which they have achieved on eight occasions, most recently in 2012. Austria has also received nul points on four occasions; in 1962, 1988, 1991 and 2015.

The Austrian national broadcaster, Österreichischer Rundfunk (ORF), broadcasts the event within Austria and organises the selection process for the nation's entry. ORF confirmed their intentions to participate at the 2019 Eurovision Song Contest on 21 September 2018. From 2011 to 2013 as well as in 2015 and 2016, ORF set up national finals with several artists to choose both the song and performer to compete at Eurovision for Austria, with both the public and a panel of jury members involved in the selection. In 2014 and since 2017, ORF has held an internal selection to choose the artist and song to represent Austria at the contest.

== Before Eurovision ==
=== Internal selection ===
Up to 12 artists, including singers Hyäne Fischer, Joe Traxler and Sara De Blue, were nominated by the ORF Eurovision Song Contest Team led by ORF chief editor Stefan Zechner, which collaborated with music expert Eberhard Forcher who worked on the selection of the Austrian entries since 2016, to submit songs to the broadcaster. On 14 January 2019, Forcher revealed that three entries had been shortlisted with a final decision to be made within the week. On 29 January 2019, "Limits" written and performed by Paenda was announced by ORF as the Austrian entry for the Eurovision Song Contest 2019. Paenda was selected from the three shortlisted artists by Forcher, the ORF Eurovision Team and a panel of around 15 to 20 music industry and Eurovision experts, but was requested to submit a new song from her forthcoming unreleased album Evolution II due to the one initially submitted being deemed unconvincing enough. The presentation of the song took place on 8 March 2019 at an ORF press conference as well as during the radio show Ö3-Wecker, aired on Hitradio Ö3.

=== Promotion ===
Paenda made several appearances across Europe to specifically promote "Limits" as the Austrian Eurovision entry. On 6 April, Pænda performed during the Eurovision in Concert event which was held at the AFAS Live venue in Amsterdam, Netherlands and hosted by Cornald Maas and Marlayne. On 14 April, Pænda performed during the London Eurovision Party, which was held at the Café de Paris venue in London, United Kingdom and hosted by Nicki French and Paddy O’Connell.

== At Eurovision ==
According to Eurovision rules, all nations with the exceptions of the host country and the "Big Five" (France, Germany, Italy, Spain and the United Kingdom) are required to qualify from one of two semi-finals in order to compete for the final; the top ten countries from each semi-final progress to the final. The European Broadcasting Union (EBU) split up the competing countries into six different pots based on voting patterns from previous contests, with countries with favourable voting histories put into the same pot. On 28 January 2019, a special allocation draw was held which placed each country into one of the two semi-finals, as well as which half of the show they would perform in. Austria was placed into the first semi-final, to be held on 14 May 2019, and was scheduled to perform in the second half of the show.

Once all the competing songs for the 2019 contest had been released, the running order for the semi-finals was decided by the shows' producers rather than through another draw, so that similar songs were not placed next to each other. Austria was set to perform in position 9, following the entry from Sweden and before the entry from Croatia.

The two semi-finals and the final were broadcast in Austria on ORF 1 with commentary by Andi Knoll. The Austrian spokesperson, who announced the top 12-point score awarded by the Austrian jury during the final, was Philipp Hansa.

=== Semi-final ===
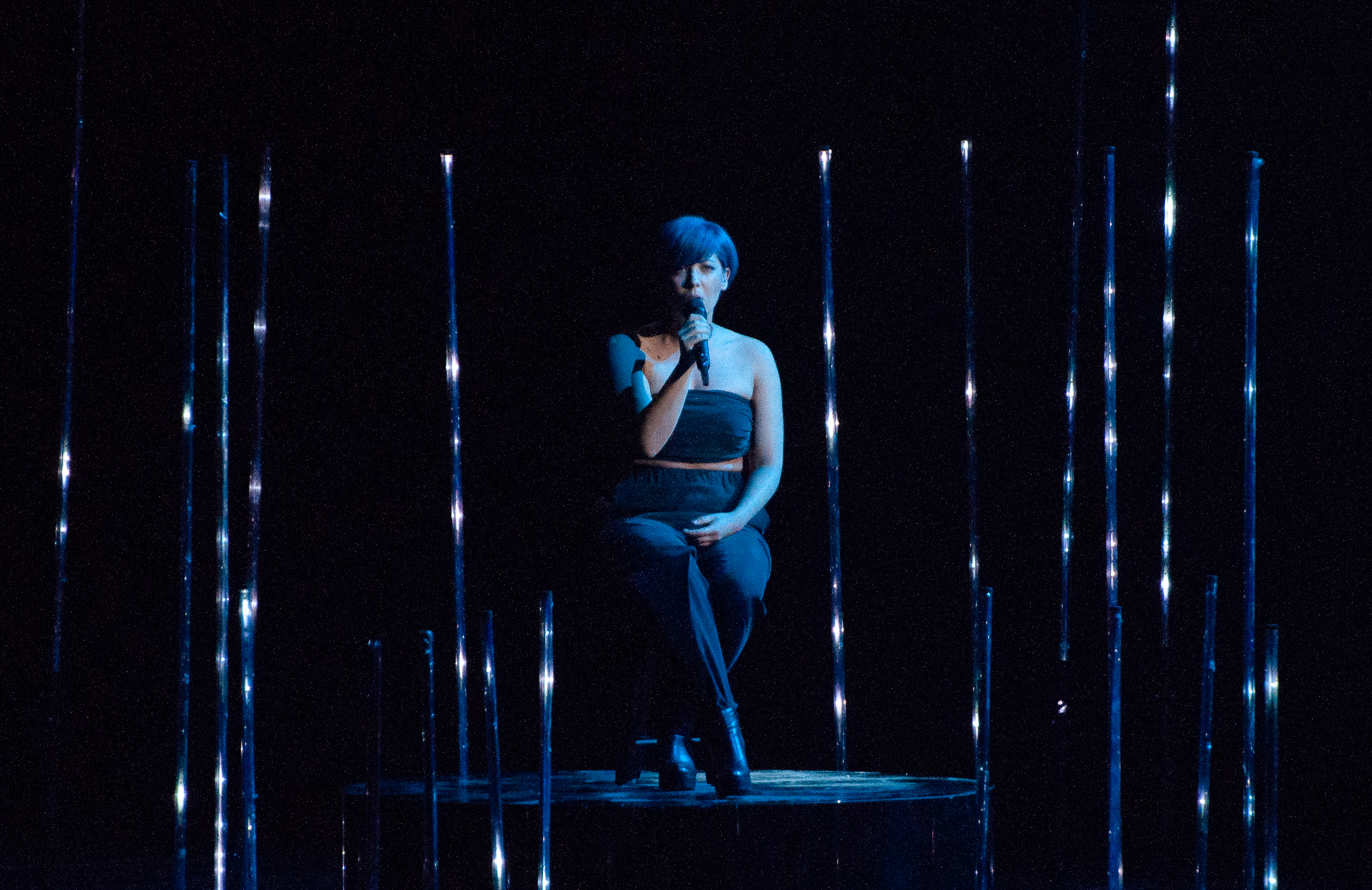
Pænda during a rehearsal before the second semi-final

Paenda took part in technical rehearsals on 6 and 10 May, followed by dress rehearsals on 13 and 14 May. This included the jury show on 13 May where the professional juries of each country watched and voted on the competing entries.

The Austrian performance featured Paenda sitting on a stool and performing on a black and white stage, with explosions of lights throughout the performance from thin light poles surrounding Paenda that create patterns and from the triangles on the ceiling. Paenda was joined by three off-stage backing vocalists: Christina Horn, Noy Ben Shabat and Or Ilan.

At the end of the show, Austria was not announced among the top 10 entries in the second semi-final and therefore failed to qualify to compete in the final. It was later revealed that Austria placed seventeenth in the semi-final, receiving a total of 21 points: 0 points from the televoting and 21 points from the juries.

=== Voting ===
Voting during the three shows involved each country awarding two sets of points from 1-8, 10 and 12: one from their professional jury and the other from televoting. Each nation's jury consisted of five music industry professionals who are citizens of the country they represent, with their names published before the contest to ensure transparency. This jury judged each entry based on: vocal capacity; the stage performance; the song's composition and originality; and the overall impression by the act. In addition, no member of a national jury was permitted to be related in any way to any of the competing acts in such a way that they cannot vote impartially and independently. The individual rankings of each jury member as well as the nation's televoting results were released shortly after the grand final.

Below is a breakdown of points awarded to Austria and awarded by Austria in the second semi-final and grand final of the contest, and the breakdown of the jury voting and televoting conducted during the two shows:

==== Points awarded to Austria ====
Points awarded to Austria (Semi-final 2)
Score	Televote	Jury
12 points		
10 points		
8 points		Sweden
7 points		
6 points		Lithuania
5 points		
4 points		
3 points		
2 points		Denmark
1 point		Albania; Germany; Italy; Latvia; Romania

==== Points awarded by Austria ====
Points awarded by Austria (Semi-final 2)
Score	Televote	Jury
12 points	Switzerland	Sweden
10 points	Norway	Netherlands
8 points	Croatia	North Macedonia
7 points	Azerbaijan	Switzerland
6 points	Netherlands	Azerbaijan
5 points	North Macedonia	Croatia
4 points	Russia	Denmark
3 points	Albania	Norway
2 points	Denmark	Malta
1 point	Sweden	Armenia

Points awarded by Austria (Final)
Score	Televote	Jury
12 points	Switzerland	North Macedonia
10 points	Italy	Switzerland
8 points	Norway	Netherlands
7 points	Netherlands	Italy
6 points	Iceland	Sweden
5 points	Russia	France
4 points	Serbia	Azerbaijan
3 points	Australia	Czech Republic
2 points	Slovenia	Serbia
1 point	Azerbaijan	Norway

==== Detailed voting results ====
The following members comprised the Austrian jury:

- Peter Vieweger (jury chairperson) – musician, represented Austria in the 1983 contest as member of Weekend
- Stephanie Lorenz-Stauffer (Missy May) – singer
- Bettina Ruprechter – PR consultant, coach
- Mathea Elisabeth Höller (Mathea) – singer and composer
- Julian Heidrich (Julian Le Play) – artist

Detailed voting results from Austria (Semi-final 2)
R/O	Country	Jury							Televote	
R/O	Country	P. Vieweger	Missy May	B. Ruprechter	Mathea	J. Le Play	Rank	Points	Rank	Points
01	Armenia	4	16	17	6	9	10	1	13	
02	Ireland	14	17	12	8	16	15		16	
03	Moldova	16	9	11	15	17	16		17	
04	Switzerland	7	8	5	1	6	4	7	1	12
05	Latvia	11	12	16	10	12	14		15	
06	Romania	15	10	10	11	11	13		12	
07	Denmark	5	7	8	4	14	7	4	9	2
08	Sweden	8	1	1	5	2	1	12	10	1
09	Austria									
10	Croatia	2	4	6	16	8	6	5	3	8
11	Malta	9	15	14	3	4	9	2	11	
12	Lithuania	17	14	13	12	13	17		14	
13	Russia	13	3	15	13	15	11		7	4
14	Albania	12	13	9	17	7	12		8	3
15	Norway	3	6	7	14	10	8	3	2	10
16	Netherlands	10	5	2	2	1	2	10	5	6
17	North Macedonia	1	2	4	7	5	3	8	6	5
18	Azerbaijan	6	11	3	9	3	5	6	4	7

Detailed voting results from Austria (Final)
R/O	Country	Jury							Televote	
R/O	Country	P. Vieweger	Missy May	B. Ruprechter	Mathea	J. Le Play	Rank	Points	Rank	Points
01	Malta	17	14	18	5	10	15		21	
02	Albania	24	17	19	18	17	24		11	
03	Czech Republic	16	11	10	4	9	8	3	18	
04	Germany	21	6	16	13	8	14		17	
05	Russia	4	10	15	16	21	12		6	5
06	Denmark	18	13	14	9	18	17		13	
07	San Marino	26	24	8	26	22	20		23	
08	North Macedonia	1	1	7	7	2	1	12	12	
09	Sweden	7	4	2	6	5	5	6	16	
10	Slovenia	22	22	9	19	11	18		9	2
11	Cyprus	2	20	24	21	16	11		22	
12	Netherlands	12	3	3	3	1	3	8	4	7
13	Greece	23	25	26	24	24	26		26	
14	Israel	25	19	13	20	23	22		20	
15	Norway	8	5	12	15	15	10	1	3	8
16	United Kingdom	20	18	11	11	20	19		24	
17	Iceland	19	26	21	12	26	21		5	6
18	Estonia	15	21	22	23	19	25		15	
19	Belarus	11	16	23	10	14	16		25	
20	Azerbaijan	10	12	5	14	6	7	4	10	1
21	France	9	7	6	8	7	6	5	14	
22	Italy	14	15	1	2	3	4	7	2	10
23	Serbia	3	8	20	17	13	9	2	7	4
24	Switzerland	6	2	4	1	4	2	10	1	12
25	Australia	5	9	25	22	12	13		8	3
26	Spain	13	23	17	25	25	23		19	
