= Psycho Village =

Austrian rock band

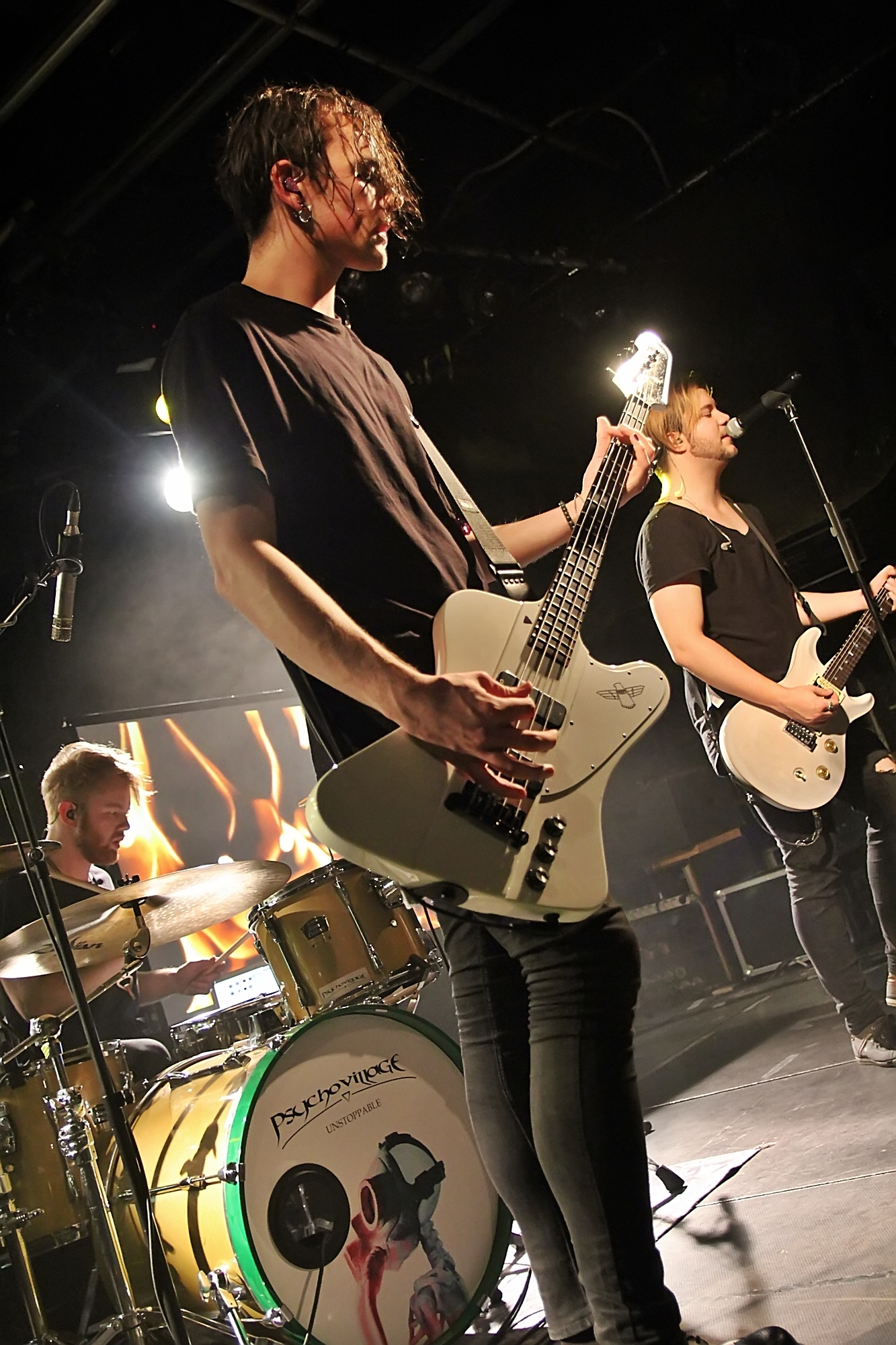
- Psycho Village in 2020

Background information
- Origin: Lower Austria
- Genres: Rock, post-grunge, hard rock
- Years active: 2009–present
- Members: Daniel Kremsner (guitars, vocals); Maximilian Raps (bass)
- Website: psychovillage.com

Psycho Village is an Austrian rock band.

== History ==
=== Beginnings and It's Okay ===
Psycho Village was founded in 2009 by singer and guitarist Daniel Kremsner at age 15. In 2012, the band started a collaboration with producer Gwenael Damman (known for working with Avril Lavigne, etc.). In the same year the band toured Austria and began the production of their first single "It's Okay." On 15 March 2013, "It's Okay" was released in Austria. On 5 April 2013, the song debuted on the official Austrian charts – Ö3 Austria Top 40 – at No. 62 and reached No. 32 on the charts. "It's Okay" also reached No. 8 on the iTunes Charts. The single was mixed by Richard Furch (Christina Aguilera, Usher, Prince etc.) and mastered by Will Quinnell (Rihanna, Nelly Furtado, Jonas Brothers etc.).

=== Selfmade Fairytale – Part 1 ===
The EP Selfmade Fairytale – Part 1 was released on 30 May 2014, and earned positive critical reviews. The music magazine Enemy called Selfmade Fairytale – Part 1 one of the best debuts by an Austrian band and rated it 4 / 5 Stars, as did Stormbringer magazine.

The German magazine Rock Hard said, "On their dabut, the boys sound so professional and finished, that even though the temperature is rising Alter Bridge, Shinedown & Co. can wrap themselves up warm. Seven songs, seven earcatchers, seven times dynamite!"

The single "Perfect" entered the Austrian rock-charts at No. 1 and the iTunes- and Downloadcharts in Austria on at No. 3. "Perfect" reached No. 30 on the Austria Top 40 and No. 220 on the Euro 200 charts.

During the Selfmade Fairytale Tour in 2014, Psycho Village performed sold-out shows all over Austria and performed at the Sziget Festival in Hungary, and at the Donauinselfest in Vienna.

=== Unstoppable ===
After touring with international bands across Europe and the UK, including Nothing More, Puddle of Mudd, Sick Puppies & Saving Abel, Psycho Village signed two distribution deals for the debut Album Unstoppable with Germany Label 7us Media Group, and US Label, Pavement Entertainment,

The album Unstoppable was released on 27 September 2019, followed by three Europe and UK tours, supporting Skindred, tAKiDa & The Calling. A first tour in the US was announced with Trapt, The Calling & Smile empty soul.

=== Fragile ===
In 2021, the band released the first single of an upcoming album, called Legendary, featuring Benji Webbe of Skindred. The single reached #1 on the German alternative charts, DAC

In 2022 Psycho Village released another single, called Fragile featuring The Bunny The Bear & toured with Hed PE & The Bunny The Bear throughout Europe and the UK.

2023 saw the band release the new album called Fragile. The band collaborated with a number of artists including Skindred, The Bunny The Bear, Eyes Set to Kill, and Hed PE. Psycho Village was also featured on the cover of multiple German music magazines including MusiX & Slam

In 2023 the band toured with Escape the fate, Fever 333 & Eyes Set to Kill across Europe and the UK.

In September 2023, the album Fragile received an Impala silver certification for 20.000 records sold or equivalent streams.

=== Social engagement ===
On 16 March 2013, Band announced all the income from "March" would be donated to Save the Children. The band donated all the income from the sold out concert at the Viper Room in Vienna on 28 June 2013, to charities to support the victims of the big flood in Austria. In September 2013, the band played a benefit to support the Waluka Projekt, raising money for schools in Kenya. On the following day Psycho Village played at the 9er Haus in Hennersdorf, Lower Austria, to support the Rote Nasen charity, which received all the profits.

== Discography ==
=== Singles ===
Year	Title	AT	iTunes	DAC	Release
2013	It's Okay Selfmade Fairytale Part 1	32 (7 wks.)	8 (24 wks.)	–	15 March 2013
2014	Perfect Selfmade Fairytale Part 1	30 (7 wks.)	3 (342 wks.)	–	22 May 2014
2014	Through My Eyes Selfmade Fairytale Part 1	11 (3 wks.)	1 (15 wks.)	–	14 October 2014
2018	What Was That Unstoppable	–	–	–	September 2018
2019	Chasing The Sun Unstoppable	–	20 (1 wk.)	–	27. September 2019
2020	Unstoppable Unstoppable	–	–	–	17 April 2020
2021	Legendary Fragile	–	–	1	10 September 2021

=== EPs ===
Year	Album details
2014	Selfmade Fairytale – Part 1: Released: 30.05 2014; Label: Self-released; Formats: CD, Digital, Stream

=== Album ===
Year	Album details	
2020	UNSTOPPABLE: Released: 27.09.19, 17.04.20; Label: 7hard, Pavement Entertainment; Formats: CD, Digital, Stream	
2023	FRAGILE: Released: 27.10.23; Label: 7hard; Formats: CD, Digital, Stream	IMPALA: Silver

== Music videos ==
Year	Song	Producer	Album
2013	It's Okay	Daniel Kremsner	Selfmade Fairytale Part 1
2014	Perfect	Daniel Kremsner / Mr Cutty	Selfmade Fairytale Part 1
2014	Without You	Daniel Kremsner	Selfmade Fairytale Part 1
2014	Through My Eyes	Daniel Kremsner / Mr Cutty	Selfmade Fairytale Part 1
2017	Half Caste Symphony	Daniel Kremsner	Selfmade Fairytale Part 1
2018	Can´t You See	Daniel Kremsner	Selfmade Fairytale Part 1
2019	UNSTOPPABLE	Daniel Kremsner	UNSTOPPABLE
2020	UNSTOPPABLE (US edit)	Daniel Kremsner	UNSTOPPABLE
2020	What Was That	Daniel Kremsner	UNSTOPPABLE
2021	Legendary feat. Skindred´s Benji Webbe	Daniel Kremsner	Fragile
2022	Fragile feat. The Bunny The Bear	Daniel Kremsner	Fragile
2023	When I Look Around Me feat. Eyes Set to Kill	Daniel Kremsner	Fragile
2023	Take Me Back	Daniel Kremsner	Fragile
2024	Finally Over feat. Hed P.E.	Daniel Kremsner	Fragile
2024	Afraid	Daniel Kremsner	Fragile

== Tours ==
Year	Tour	Headliner	Shows
2013	It's Okay Tour	Psycho Village	36
March–October 2014	Selfmade Fairytale Tour – part 1	Psycho Village	26
November–December 2014	Friends in Fall Tour 2014	Psycho Village / Excuse Me Moses	7
March–May 2015	Spring Break Festival Tour 2015	Psycho Village	11
September 2015 – February 2016	WTF was that? Festival Tour	Psycho Village	12
June 2017	The Creepshow Europe Tour	The Creepshow, Psycho Village	8
June–August 2017	Fates Warning Tour	Fates Warning, Psycho Village	8
Oktober-November 2017	Psycho Village headline Tour 2017	Psycho Village	12
November – December 2017	Nothing More, The Stories We Tell Ourselves	Nothing More, Psycho Village	18
February 2018	The Raveneye Tour	The Raveneye, Psycho Village	11
March – April 2018	The Fallen State Tour 2018	The Fallen State, Psycho Village, Liberty Lies	11
June–October 2018	Puddle of Mudd Europe Tour 2018	Puddle of Mudd, Psycho Village, Broach, Rev Kiddo	17
July 2018	Sick Puppies Fury Tour 2018	Sick Puppies, Psycho Village	17
August – September 2018	Saving Abel Europe Tour 2018	Saving Abel, Psycho Village, 10 years, My Silent Bravery, My Own Ghost	15
February 2019	Art of Dissent 2018	Otep, Psycho Village, tHola	20
April 2019	Conspiracy Tour	The Raven Age, Psycho Village	5
June, December 2019	Big Tings Tour	Skindred, Psycho Village	2
September 2019	Death at my Door Tour	The Creepshow, The Anti-Queens, Psycho Village	12
October 2019	Master Tour	tAKiDa, Psycho Village	12
January, February, March 2020	Alex Band's THE CALLING of Europe tour	THE CALLING, PSYCHO VILLAGE	52
September 2022	The Bunny The Bear UK Tour	The Bunny The Bear, PSYCHO VILLAGE	9
October, November, December 2022	Hed (PE) & Psycho Village tour	hed (PE), Psycho Village	32
March, April 2023	Manifest tour	Eyes Set to Kill, Psycho Village	27
June 2023	Escape The Fate Europe Tour	Escape The Fate, Psycho Village	5

== Awards ==
Year	Nominated	Award	Category	Result
2011	Goodbye (Psycho Village)	Happyfan&Goitzsche Radio Award	Best Song	Won
2012	Psycho Village	Austrian Newcomer Award	U21	Nominated
2013	It's Okay (Psycho Village)	Happyfan&Goitzsche Radio Award	Best Song	Nominated
2014	Psycho Village	Austrian Newcomer Award	Austrian Newcomer 2014	Nominated
2015	Psycho Village	GoTV Local Hero Wahl	best Austrian Band/Act 2014	Nominated
2015	Psycho Village	Austrian Newcomer Award	Austrian Newcomer 2015	Nominated
2015	Psycho Village	Rockvideos.at	Best LiveBand Austria	Nominated
2016	Psycho Village	Austrian Newcomer Award	Austrian Newcomer 2014	Nominated
