= Amen (Vincent Bueno song) =

2021 song by Vincent Bueno

Single by Vincent Bueno
- Released: 9 March 2021
- Length: 2:55
- Label: Unified Songs
- Songwriters: Tobias Carshey; Ashley Hicklin; Jonas Thander
- Producers: Pele Loriano; Jonas Thander; Mikołaj Trybulec

Vincent Bueno singles chronology
"Instant Dose" (2020)	"Amen" (2021)

Music video
- "Amen" on YouTube

Eurovision Song Contest 2021 entry
- Country: Austria
- Artist: Vincent Bueno
- Composers: Tobias Carshey; Ashley Hicklin; Jonas Thander
- Lyricists: Tobias Carshey; Ashley Hicklin; Jonas Thander

Finals performance
- Semi-final result: 12th
- Semi-final points: 66

Entry chronology
- ◄ "Alive" (2020)
- "Halo" (2022) ►

"Amen" is a song by Austrian singer Vincent Bueno. The song represented Austria in the Eurovision Song Contest 2021 in Rotterdam, the Netherlands.

== Eurovision Song Contest ==
=== Internal selection ===
On 26 March 2020, ORF confirmed that Vincent Bueno would represent Austria in the 2021 contest.

=== At Eurovision ===
The 65th edition of the Eurovision Song Contest took place in Rotterdam, the Netherlands and consisted of two semi-finals on 18 May and 20 May 2021, and the grand final on 22 May 2021. According to the Eurovision rules, all participating countries, except the host nation and the "Big Five", consisting of France, Germany, Italy, Spain and the United Kingdom, are required to qualify from one of two semi-finals to compete for the final, although the top 10 countries from the respective semi-final progress to the grand final. On 17 November 2020, it was announced that Austria would be performing in the first half of the second semi-final of the contest. After the second semi final, Austria was not announced as to be in the top ten, which meant that it would not go to the grand final
