= Isabella Krassnitzer =

Austrian journalist

Isabella Krassnitzer (born 22 July 1967 in Klagenfurt) is an Austrian journalist, radio and television presenter, best known for her reporting on ORF and Hitradio Ö3 since 1995.
