= Mach dich bereit! =

Mach Dich Bereit

Studio album by Luttenberger*Klug
- Released: February 2007
- Recorded: 2007
- Genre: Alternative
- Label: Deag Music (Warner)

Mach Dich Bereit is Luttenberger*Klug's debut album.

== Track listing ==
1. "Gefangen im Jetzt" – 3:22
2. "Mach dich bereit" – 3:18
3. "Vergiss mich" – 3:55
4. "Heut Nacht" – 3:54
5. "Weil es mich nur 1x Gibt" – 3:57
6. "Wolke" – 4:07
7. "Mohnblumenfeld" – 3:55
8. "1000x" – 4:01
9. "Sommertag" – 3:44
10. "Karma" – 3:53
11. "Ich bin noch hier" – 3:51
12. "Du kommst nicht mehr los" – 4:35
13. "Erzähl mir von Shakespeare" – 4:03
14. "Super Sommer" – 3:03
15. "Madchen" - 3:15 (Bonus Track)
16. "Unendlichkeit" - 3:49 (Bonus Track)

== Singles ==
Year	Single	Austria	Austria (Austro-Hits)	Germany
2005(AT)/2006(GER)	"Super Sommer"	28	1	44
2006(AT)/2007(GER)	"Vergiss Mich"	6	1	29
