= Katharina Bellowitsch =

Austrian radio and TV presenter

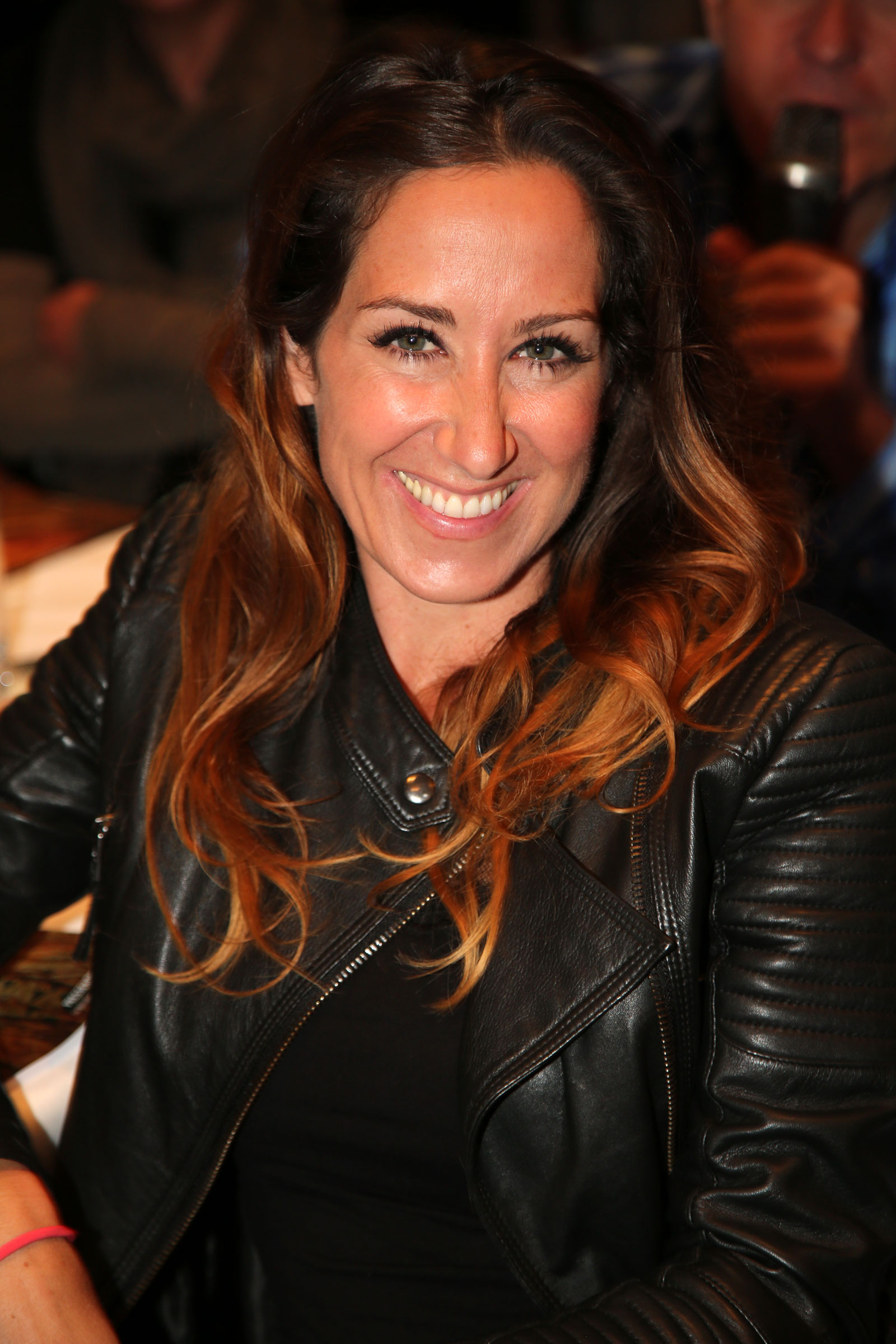
- Bellowitsch in 2015
- Born: Katharina Bellowitsch; 13 June 1974 (age 52); Graz, Austria
- Occupation: Television presenter
- Years active: 1996–present

Katharina "Kati" Bellowitsch (born 13 June 1974) is an Austrian radio and TV presenter, podcaster, and life coach.

== Career ==
Born in Graz, Styria, Bellowitsch trained as a primary school teacher before becoming, in 1996, a presenter at a commercial radio station in Styria (Antenne Steiermark). Since 2000, she has been working for the ORF, both for Hitradio Ö3 and children's television, in particular a weekly and a daily programme called Forscherexpress ("Researchers' Express"), where children are introduced into the world of science, and Drachenschatz (Dragon's treasure), which is a quiz show for children. She co-hosts in both of them with Thomas Brezina.

In February 2010, she was a presenter at the Vienna Opera Ball.

Bellowitsch announced Austria's voting results in the Eurovision Song Contest from 2011 to 2016, and again in 2018. She stood down from the role in 2019, with the role being taken over by Philipp Hansa.
