= Paenda =

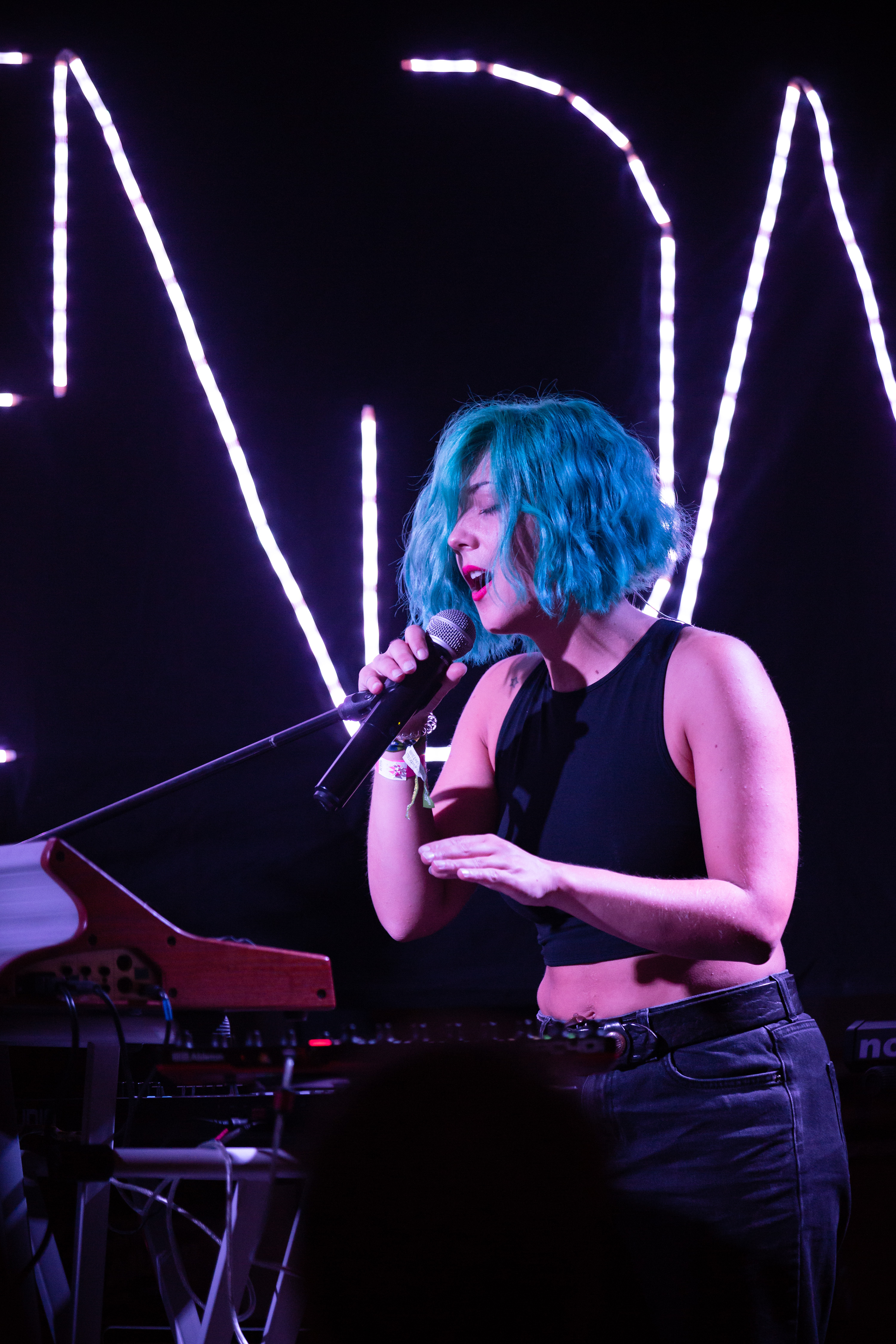
- Paenda in 2017

Background information
- Born: Gabriela Horn; 25 January 1988 (age 38); Deutschlandsberg, Styria, Austria
- Genres: Electropop
- Occupations: Singer; songwriter; producer
- Years active: 2016–present
- Website: https://paendaofficial.com/

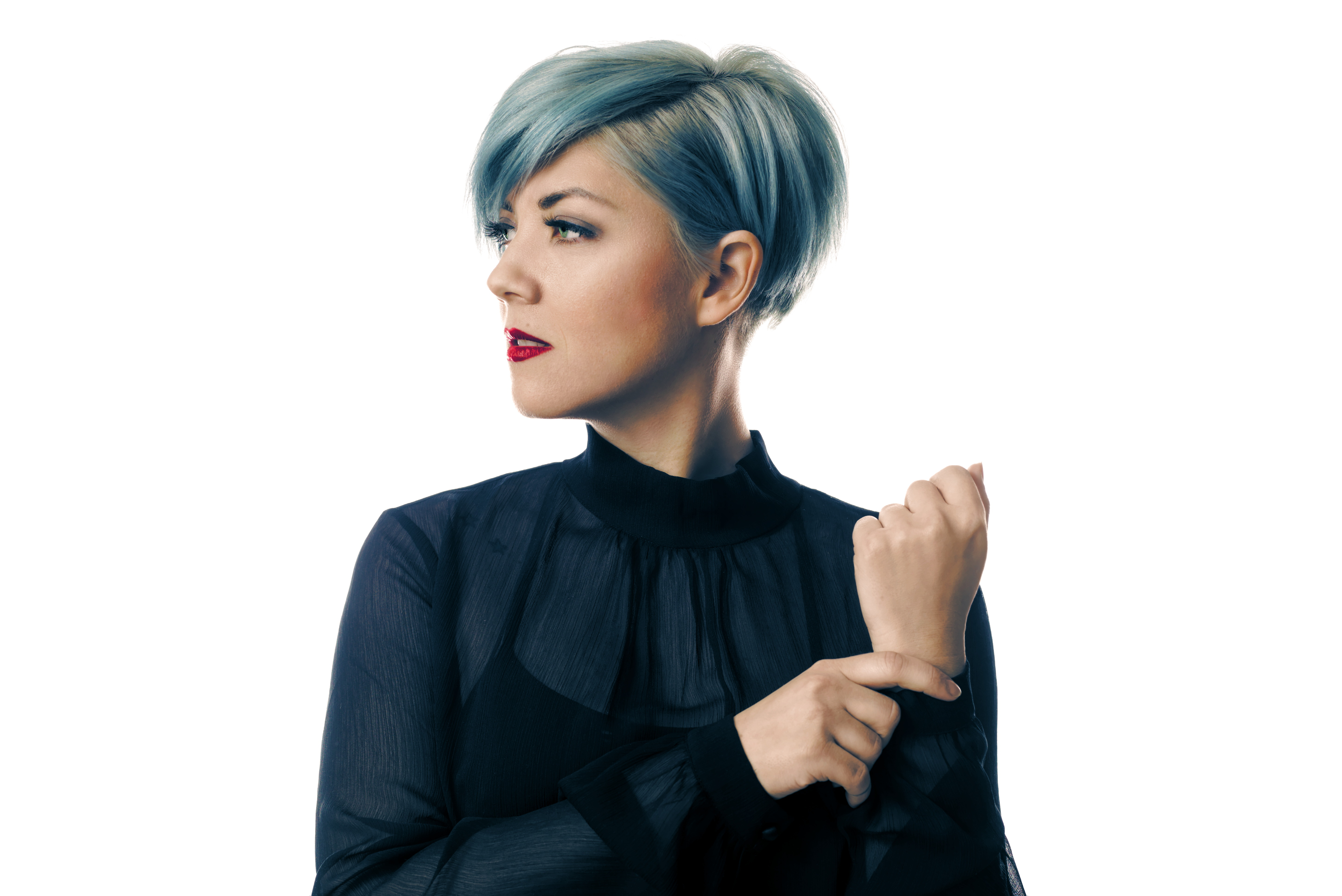
Paenda in 2019

Gabriela Horn (born 25 January 1988), known professionally as Paenda (pronounced "panda"; stylised as PÆNDA), is an Austrian singer, songwriter and music producer. She represented Austria in the Eurovision Song Contest 2019 with the song "Limits", which was released on 8 March.

== Life and career ==
Horn was born in January 1988, in Deutschlandsberg, Styria. She started singing in a choir in her home town at the age of six. At fourteen, she began songwriting and singing in various pop rock bands. She took guitar and piano lessons and moved to Vienna at age 20 to study pop and jazz music at the Vienna Music Institute, where she graduated with honors in 2013. She currently lives in Vienna, writing, composing and producing her music at her home studio. Horn records and writes all of her own songs.

=== Eurovision ===
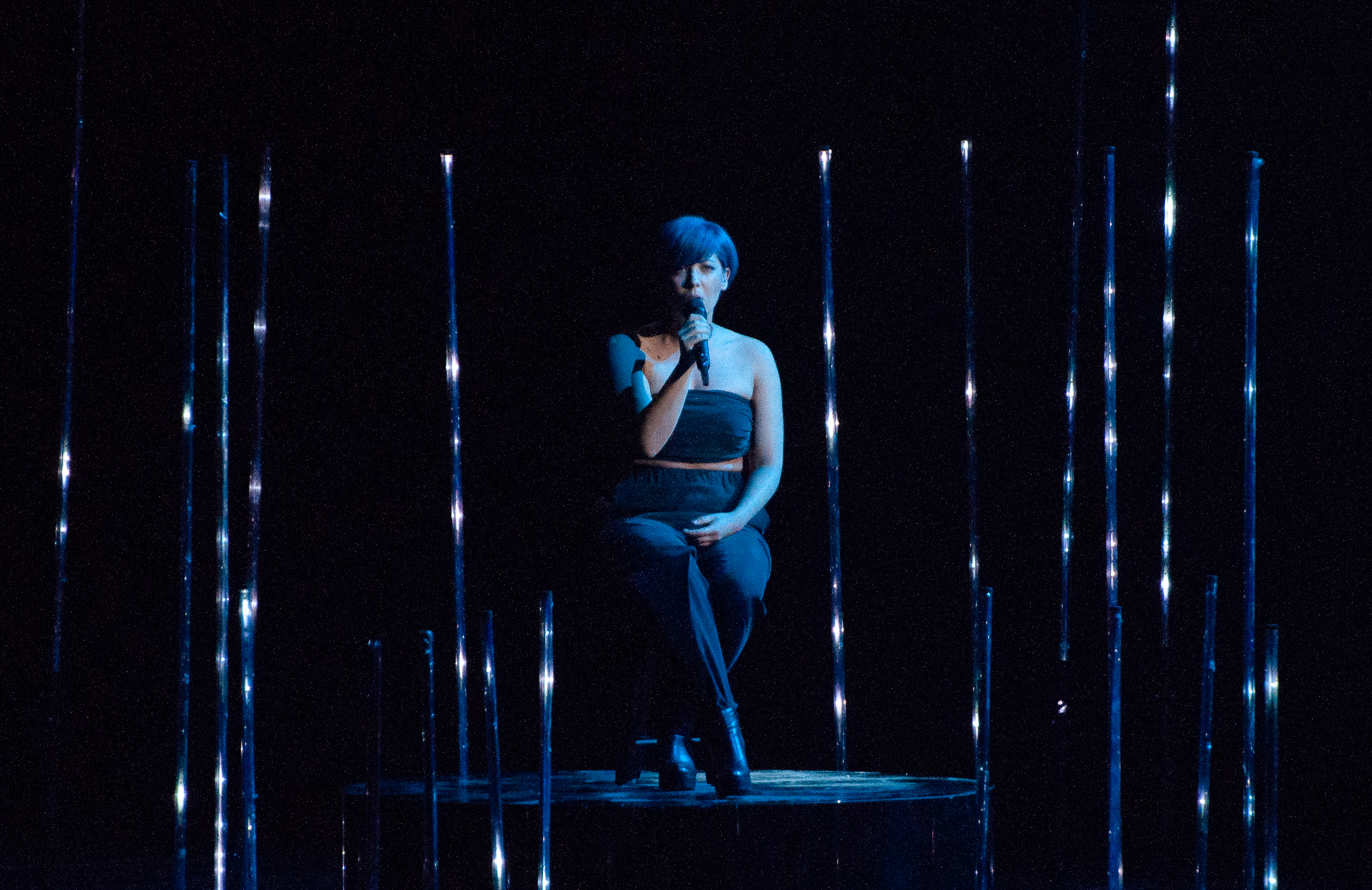
PAENDA at the 2019 Eurovision Song Contest Semi-final 2 dress rehearsal

In 2019, Horn was chosen by a team of music experts and broadcaster ORF to represent Austria at the 64th Eurovision Song Contest in Tel Aviv. She performed her song "Limits", which finished second last with 21 points, and as a result did not qualify for the final.

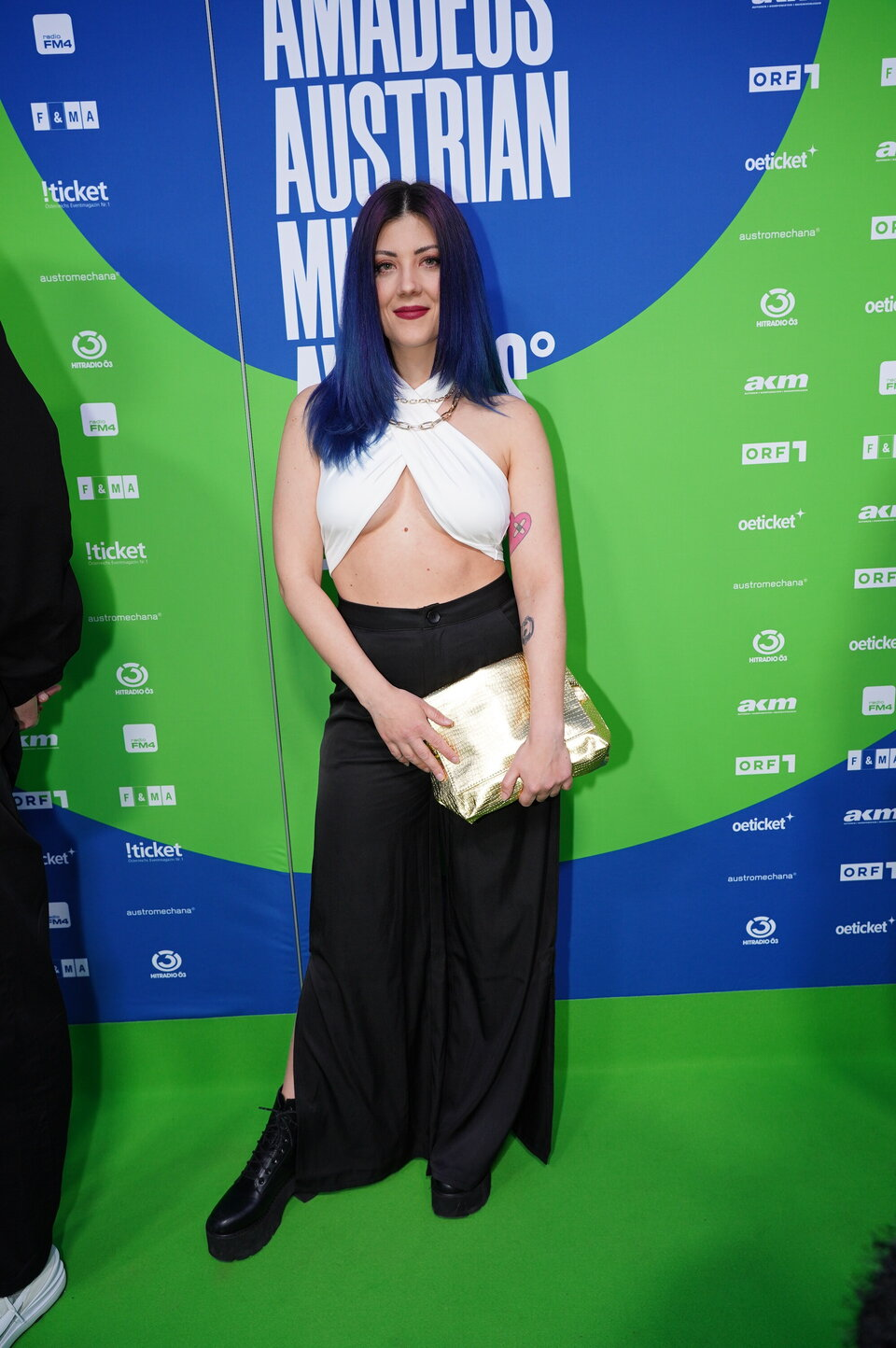
PAENDA at the Amadeus Music Award 2022

== Discography ==
=== Studio albums ===
Title	Details
Evolution I	Released: 2 February 2018; Label: Wohnzimmer; Formats: CD, digital download
Evolution II	Released: 26 April 2019; Label: Wohnzimmer; Formats: CD, digital download
Call Me Cat	Released: 6 October 2023; Label: Ideas Edition; Formats: Digital download, streaming

=== Extended plays ===
Title	Details
My Heart	Released: 27 November 2020; Label: Sick Kick Records; Formats: CD, digital download
My Issues	Released: 7 May 2021; Label: Ideas Edition; Formats: Digital download, streaming
Too Young to Feel Old, Too Old to Feel Young	Released: 13 March 2026; Label: Sick Kick Records; Formats: CD, digital download

=== Singles ===
Title	Year	Album or EP
"Waves"	2016	Evolution I
"Good Girl"	2018	Evolution I
"Paper-thin"	2018	Evolution I
"Limits"	2019	Evolution II
"Like a Domino"	2019	Evolution II
"Best of It"	2020	Non-album singles
"Want Me Not to Want You"	2020	Non-album singles
"Perfect Fit"	2020	My Heart
"Friend Zone"	2020	My Heart
"Lovers We Knew"	2021	My Issues
"Come Around" (with Adam Bü & Moodygee)	2021	Non-album single
"High and Dry"	2021	My Issues
"All 2 You" (with Adam Bü & Moodygee featuring Riley Kun)	2021	Non-album singles
"Break My Stride"	2023	Non-album singles
"Narcissistic Brain"	2023	Call Me Cat
"Get Tough"	2023	Call Me Cat
"Burning Bridges"	2024	Non-album singles
"You Go"	2024	Non-album singles
"Accelerate"	2024	Non-album singles
"60k Savage"	2024	Non-album singles
"One More Time"	2024	Non-album singles
"Up and Down"	2025	Non-album singles
"Good to Myself"	2025	Non-album singles
"Never Be Alone"	2025	Non-album singles
"Location"	2025	Non-album singles
"Ey Nah"	2025	Non-album singles
"Good Life"	2025	Non-album singles
"Her On My Mind"	2025	Too Young to Feel Old, Too Old to Feel Young
"Fires"	2025	Too Young to Feel Old, Too Old to Feel Young
"Better Days"	2026	Too Young to Feel Old, Too Old to Feel Young
"Pretty Good"	2026	Too Young to Feel Old, Too Old to Feel Young
"Hand to the Heart"	2026	Too Young to Feel Old, Too Old to Feel Young

Preceded by Cesár Sampson with "Nobody but You"	Austria in the Eurovision Song Contest; 2019	Succeeded by Vincent Bueno with "Alive"
