= Musical! Die Show =

- Genre: Docu-soap, Idol series
- Starring: Alfons Haider
- Original languages: German; English

Production
- Production location: Austria
- Running time: about 100 minutes

Original release
- Network: ORF
- Release: November 23, 2007 – January 11, 2008

Musical! Die Show (Musical! The Show) is a television musical talent show produced by the ORF, an Austrian public TV-broadcaster. The finals took place on January 11, 2008, in which Vincent Bueno was hailed as the winner.

== Programme ==
The broadcasting of the programme began in September 2007. Many interested ones joined audition. Through advance ones were the best 10 of the jurors selected.
