= Vincent Bueno =

Austrian-Filipino singer

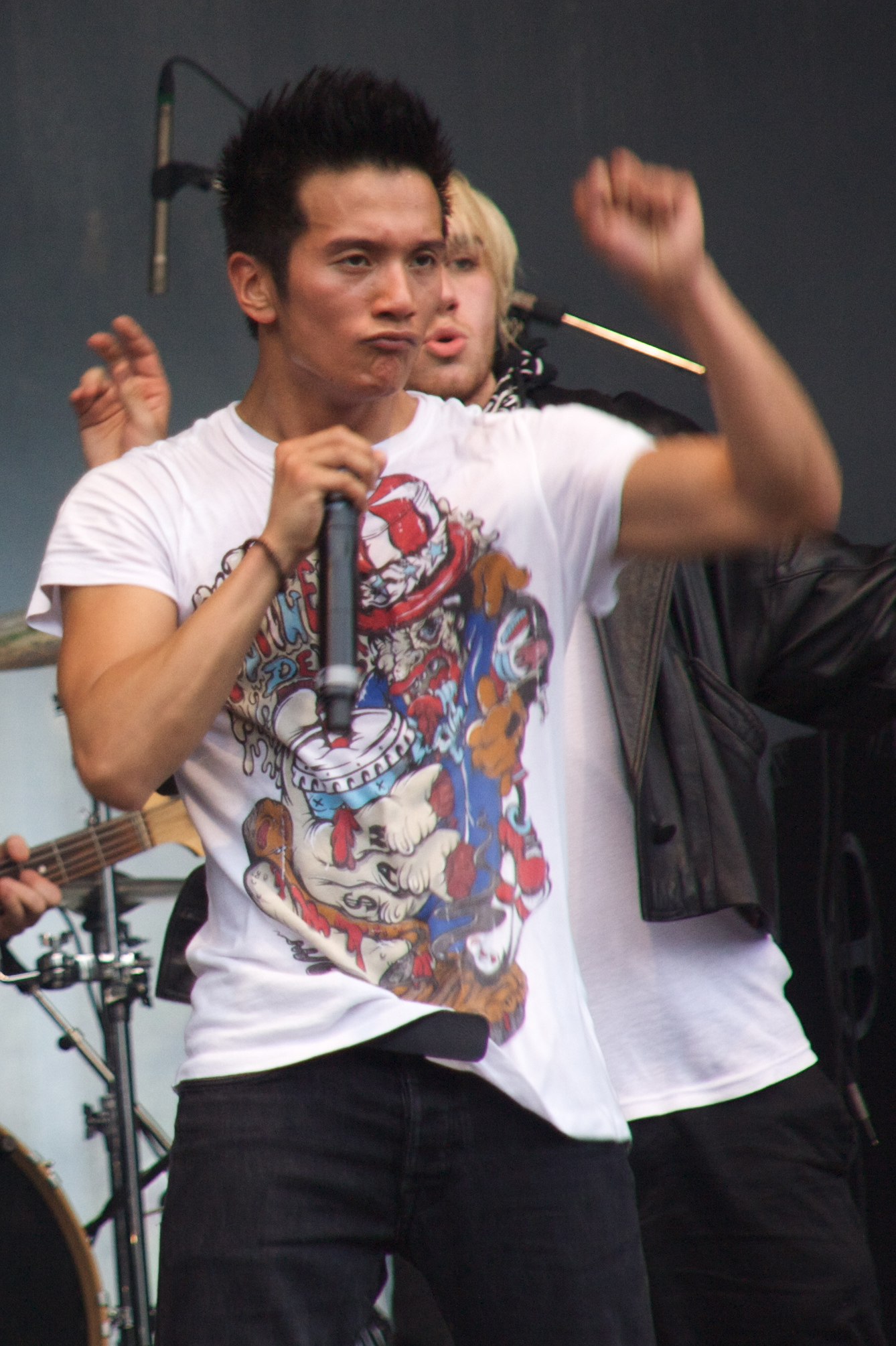
- Bueno in 2010

Background information
- Also known as: Suitcase
- Born: Vincent Mendoza Bueno; 10 December 1985 (age 40)
- Origin: Vienna, Austria
- Genres: Contemporary R&B, pop, dance
- Occupations: Singer, composer
- Instruments: singing (tenor), piano, drums, bass guitar, guitar
- Years active: 2008–present
- Label: Star Records
- Website: vincentbueno.com

Vincent Mendoza Bueno (Note: Although born in Austria, Vincent Bueno still possesses his mother's maiden name (Mendoza) as is the convention in the Philippines as indicated on public records.) (born 10 December 1985) is an Austrian singer of Filipino descent.

On 12 January 2008, he became the winner of the ORF programme, Musical! Die Show (Musical! The Show), an Austrian television musical contest.

He also served as a support act for Filipino singer Sarah Geronimo's concert in Vienna. On 18 January 2008, Bueno told the Philippine media of his plans to debut in the Philippines. He then made his first performance in Philippine Television on ASAP XV on 29 August 2010. He also signed a contract under Star Records, an ABS-CBN Entertainment Group Company, to pursue his music career in the Philippines.

He was supposed to represent Austria at the Eurovision Song Contest 2020 in Rotterdam, The Netherlands with the song, "Alive". However, on 18 March 2020, the event was cancelled due to the COVID-19 pandemic. Instead, he represented the country at the Eurovision Song Contest 2021 with the song "Amen", however it did not qualify for the final.

== Career ==
=== Early education ===
Bueno started dancing at the age of 4. He later graduated in music and performing arts at the Vienna Conservatory of Music. Bueno is also a composer of R&B music, having taken special courses in acting, dancing, and singing. At age 11, he played four musical instruments—piano, guitar, drums, and bass guitar. His father was a former vocalist and a 1970 local band lead guitarist.

=== Musical! Die Show ===
The contest Musical! Die Show began an elimination round on 23 November 2007 with 10 contestants from the 400 beginners who auditioned. Austria and other European televiewers rated / televoted the finalists. "Hair" was Vincent's first number, and he performed the songs "I Wanna Be Like You" from Jungle Book, "Superstar" from Jesus Christ Superstar, "Why God Why?" from Miss Saigon, "Singin' in the Rain", and the German "Supercalifragilisticexpialidocious!" from Mary Poppins.

Bueno defeated Eva Klikovics and Gudrun Ihninger of 10 contestants / finalists and earned the top prize of 50,000 EUR (3 million PHP) plus the "chance of a lifetime". He first performed "Greased Lightnin'" (from musical Grease), and then "The Music of the Night" (from The Phantom of the Opera). Bueno received 67% of televotes (landslide victory) from televiewers in Austria and nearby countries.

=== Foray to the Philippines ===
His first performance on Philippine television's ASAP XV was on 29 August 2010, where he was first introduced as the "Pinoy Champ Austrian Singer". He was on ASAP for some weeks. He also signed a contract under Star Records. However, he returned to Austria on 14 September 2010 to accomplish his pending tasks there. He then went back to the Philippines by early January 2011 to continue his music career.

On 28 October 2011, Vincent held his first ever mini-concert at Teatrino in Greenhills, San Juan, entitled "Got Fridays with Vincent Bueno".

=== Eurovision Song Contest ===
On 12 December 2019, ORF internally selected Bueno to represent Austria in the Eurovision Song Contest 2020 in Rotterdam, The Netherlands. He was to perform the song "Alive". However, on 18 March 2020, the event was cancelled due to the COVID-19 pandemic. Later in March 2020, ORF confirmed that Vincent Bueno will instead represent Austria in the Eurovision Song Contest 2021. He performed the song "Amen" in the second semi-final on 20 May 2021, but failed to qualify, finishing 12th.

In June 2021, Bueno released the 2-track EP titled Demos.

== Image and Artistry ==
Vincent's vocal range can be classified as tenor.

Though Vincent has one studio album and a single in German, he has also released some unofficial music videos and audios on his official YouTube and Facebook accounts.

== Personal life ==
Both his parents are Filipino Ilocano immigrants.

Along with his native German language, Vincent can speak English and conversational Filipino.

== Discography ==
=== Studio albums ===
Title	Details	Peak chart positions
Title	Details	AUT
Step by Step	Released: 4 March 2009; Format: Digital download, streaming; Label: HitSquad Records	55
Wieder Leben	Released: 2016; Format: Digital download, streaming; Label: Bueno Music	—
Invincible	Released: 2018; Format: Digital download, streaming; Label: Bueno Music	—
On the Run	Released: 27 November 2020; Format: Digital download, streaming; Label: Bueno Music	—
Soul Therapy	Released: 24 June 2022; Format: Digital download, streaming; Label: Bueno Music	—
"—" denotes a recording that did not chart or was not released in that territory.

=== Extended plays ===
Title	Details
The Austrian Idol – Vincent Bueno	Released: 2011; Format: Digital download; Label: ABS-CBN Film Production
Demos	Released: 25 June 2021; Format: Digital download; Label: Bueno Music

=== Singles ===
Title	Year	Album or EP
"Sex Appeal"	2008	Step by Step
"Party Hard"	2011	The Austrian Idol – Vincent Bueno
"Bida Best Sa Tag-Araw" (with Angeline Quinto)	2011	Non-album singles
"All We Need Is That Love"	2016	Non-album singles
"Sie ist so"	2017	Non-album singles
"Rainbow After the Storm"	2018	Non-album singles
"Get Out My Lane"	2019	Non-album singles
"Alive"	2020	Non-album singles
"Walking on Water"	2020	On the Run
"Instant Dose"	2020	On the Run
"Amen"	2021	Non-album singles
"Super Awesome Things"	2021	Non-album singles
"Rays on a Shell"	2022	Soul Therapy
"Kai Ray" (featuring Tony Bueno)	2023	Non-album singles
"Glory"	2023	Non-album singles
"Praises"	2024	Non-album singles
"Anker" (with Pray)	2024	Non-album singles
"Unafraid" (with Angela Walter)	2024	Non-album singles
"Geht ned gibt's ned" (with Angela Walter and Sylvia Graf)	2025	Non-album singles
"Rhumba with My Love"	2025	Non-album singles
"Moonlight" (with Bryan Mac)	2025	Non-album singles
"No Other You"	2026	Non-album singles

== See also ==
- Musical! Die Show
- ASAP XV

== Notes ==
Awards and achievements
Preceded by Paenda with "Limits"	Austria in the Eurovision Song Contest; 2020 (cancelled)	Succeeded by Himself with "Amen"
Preceded by Himself with "Alive"	Austria in the Eurovision Song Contest; 2021	Succeeded by Lum!x and Pia Maria with "Halo"
