= My Silent Bravery =

American pop rock band

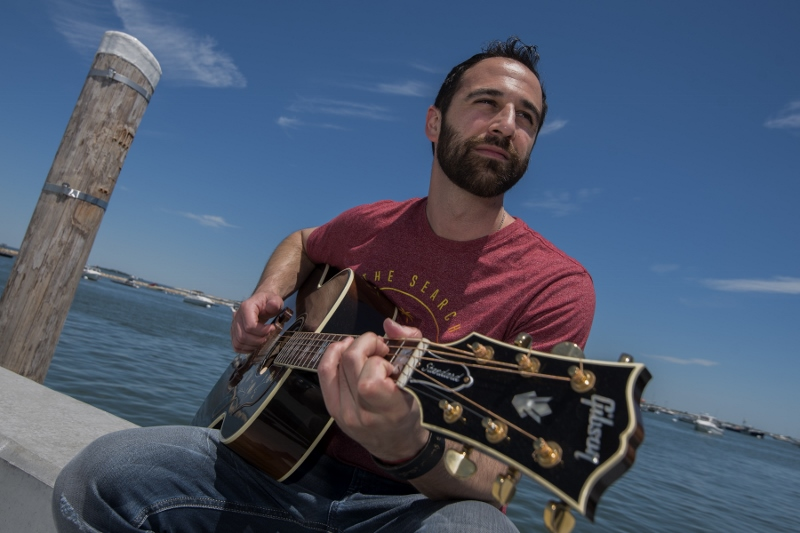

Background information
- Origin: Worcester, Massachusetts
- Genres: Pop, Alternative Rock
- Years active: 2007–present
- Label: MWS Records
- Members: Matthew Wade Shwachman
- Website: mysilentbravery.com

My Silent Bravery (MSB) is an American independent alternative pop rock solo project based in Boston, Massachusetts. Matthew Wade is the solo artist behind My Silent Bravery and has been active since 2007. Stylistically, MSB has been compared to Jason Mraz, Gavin DeGraw, and Maroon 5.

== History ==
My Silent Bravery released its first two albums, Uncharted Territory and Are You Prepared, in 2007 and 2010 respectively were featured on One Tree Hill on The CW and in The Real World on MTV. in 2010, Billboard magazine wrote of the group, "My Silent Bravery plays like a major label signing, from its production savvy, eloquent lyrics, authoritative imaging, polished website, a dedicated Northeast US following, merchandising, and most important, a chock block collection of winning songs." Songs from the third album Can't Quit, released in 2014, gained placements on the CW's One Tree Hill, CBS' People Choice Awards, MTV's Real World and True Life. "Can't Quit" was produced by Anthony Resta (Collective Soul, Shawn Mullins) and features a track with Matisyahu. The album was promoted by 3 singles, "Can't Quit", "To Give", and "Burnt Out". "Burnt Out" reached #2 on YouTube's most popular page. Both "To Give" and "Can't Quit" were nominated for several independent awards in 2013.

My Silent Bravery's 4th album Diamond From Coal was produced by Anthony Resta and Warren Huart and was recorded in both Boston and Los Angeles. The music video for the first single "Amazing" was picked up for rotation on MTV, VH1, and CMT. Diamond from Coal was also nominated for "Album of the Year" at the Limelight and New England Music Awards.

In 2015, My Silent Bravery released Diamond From Coal the Remixes. The album features Remixes by Kool Kojak ( Flo Rida, Nicki Minaj), Richard Fraioli and Erik Mason. It also has collaborations with Maurico, Shea Rose, Hybrid Infamous, and Joe Craze. The lead single and video from the album P.O.V. (featuring Shea Rose) premiered on Vevo and was also added to rotation by MTV and VH1.

My Silent Bravery released its 6th album Breakthrough on September 28, 2016. The album features producers including Mike Mangini, Peter Zizzo, and Anthony Resta. The album's second single and video "Warning Signs" was released in August 2016 via Paste Magazine. "Warning Signs" was featured on XM Sirius Satellite Radio station XM The Pulse on Train Tracks with Pat Monahan. It was also a finalist in the 2016 International Acoustic Music Awards.

On March 1, 2017, MSB released an acoustic version of the album Breakthrough. It was then that the single "Face to Face" was released. The video, directed by Vassili Shields, trended on YouTube in Canada at #1 and in Brazil at #5.

"Got it Going On" is the first single from MSB's new album "Willing to Try". It was released on July 11, 2017. The song topped the Billboard Hot Singles Sales Chart remaining at #1 for ten straight weeks. It simultaneously hit 5 Billboard charts, including #13 on the Hot Rock Songs as the "Hot Shot Debut", and #8 Alternative Digital Song Sales, #9 Rock Digital Song Sales, and #49 Emerging Artists. The song was featured on XM The Pulse on Train Tracks with Pat Monahan and the video for the song premiered via The Huffington Post and has amassed nearly 4 million views on YouTube, trending overseas in South America. The album, "Willing to Try" features twelve tracks and will be released in 3 separate EPs over the course of 2018.

"Girl You think you know" is the second single from "Willing to Try" and talks about social media pressures of curating the "perfect" life online "Girl You Think You Know" was released on October 17, 2017. It peaked at #3 on the Billboard Hot Singles Sales Chart, #13 on the Rock Digital Song Sales, and #36 on the Hot Rock Songs Sales Chart. It simultaneously reached #1 on the Soundscan Top 100 singles Chart remaining on the chart for 17 weeks. The video for the song, which also exclusively premiered on Billboard, trended overseas up to #2 on YouTube's most popular page

On February 22, 2018, MSB released its third and latest single from "Willing to Try" entitled "18" was released on February 22, 2018. It debuted at #17 on the Rock Digital Song Sales chart on March 20, 2018. The song charted on 3 Billboard charts, peaking at #8 Digital Rock Song Sales, #28 Hot Rock Songs Chart, and #33 on Emerging Artist chart.

== Tours ==
MSB has played over 300 shows between 2009 and 2011. Since 2012 MSB has played hundreds more and has toured with acts including Daughtry, Delta Rae, Howie Day, Kris Allen, John Waite, The Wailers, Candlebox, Ryan Cabrera, Ed Kowalczyk, Saving Abel, Rusted Root, Aaron Carter, Emerson Hart, Tyler Hilton, and Lee DeWyze.

== Discography ==
Albums

- Uncharted Territory (As Matt Shwachman)(2007)(Studio)
- Are You Prepared (2010)(Studio)
- Can't Quit (2011)(Studio)
- Diamond from Coal (2014)(Studio)
- Breakthrough (2016)(Studio)
- Holding Out for Hope(2020)(Studio)
- Bigger(2021)(Studio)

Compilations

- Willing to Try (2017)(Compilation)
- Uncovered(2022)(Cover)
- Silence & Bravery(2024)(Compilation)

Singles

- "Got it Going On" (2017) US Hot Rock Songs peak #13
- "Girl You Think You Know" (2017) US Hot Rock Songs peak #36
