= SheSays =

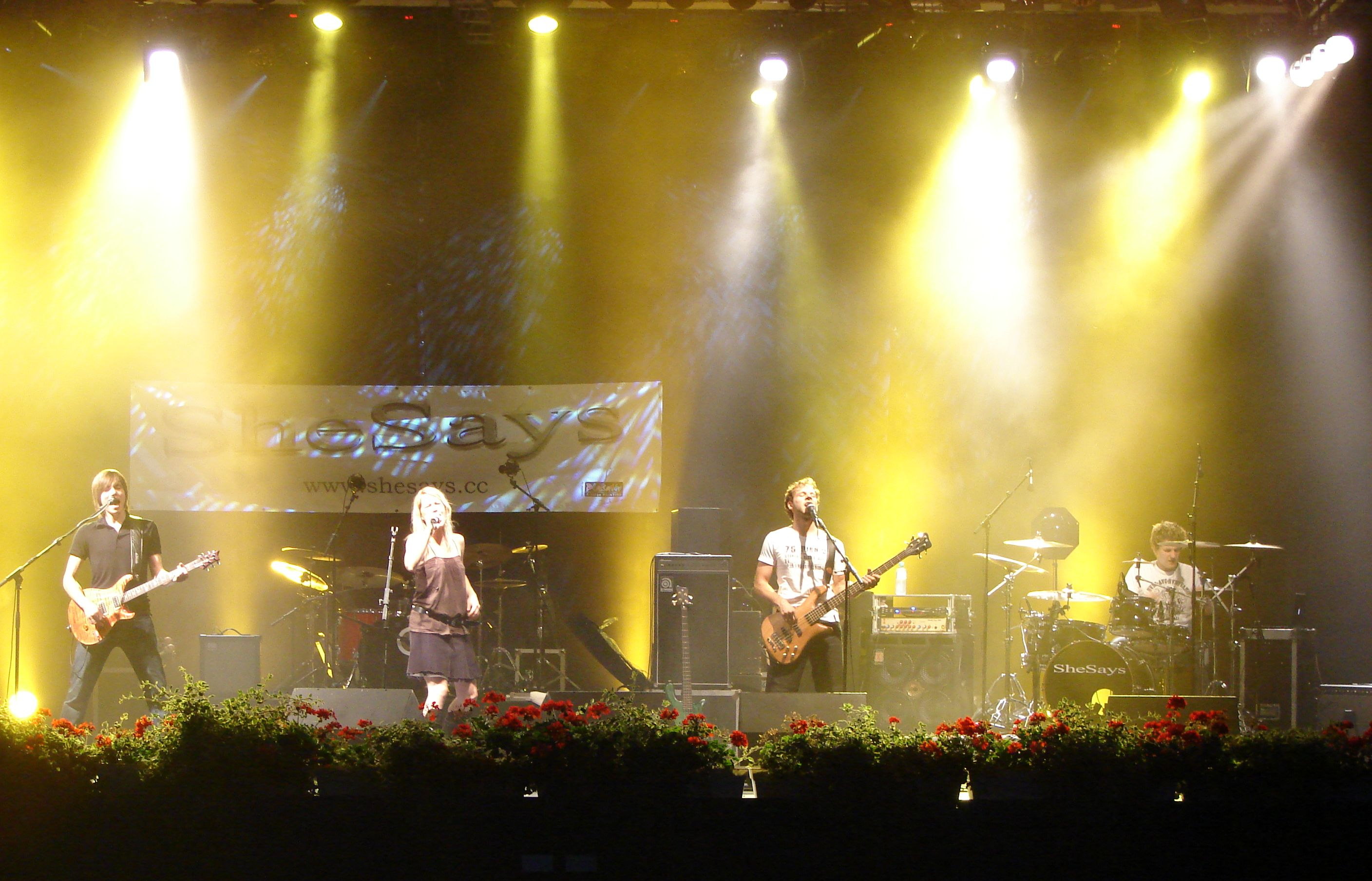
- SheSays in August 2007

Background information
- Origin: Vienna, Austria
- Genres: Rock
- Years active: 2004–
- Labels: Virgin Records/Capitol Music
- Members: Gudrun Liemberger (singer), Andy Liu (guitar)
- Past members: Cathi Priemer (drums), Valentin Rosegger (bass), Rainer Schumich
- Website: Official SheSays-Homepage

SheSays is an Austrian rock band, established in 2004.

Its founding members were Gudrun Liemberger, Andy Liu, Valentin Rosegger and Cathi Priemer.

== Members ==
The singer and songwriter Gudrun Liemberger had been educated in the Konservatorium Wien. She had experience with some bands in different music genres.

Cathi Priemer was the youngest band member and the drummer. She was born in 1984 and she graduated high school in Vienna.

Valentin Rosegger was also band member in other groups. He played at big concerts in Austrian clubs.

Andy Liu is the guitarist and was also member of other bands. He was very important for the establishment of the group.

== Band story ==
In 2006 the band won an Austrian band contest, called Soundcheck spezial. After winning this music casting show, the band became very famous in Austria. Their album SheSays peaked number 1 and their single Rosegardens reached #2 in the single charts.

In 2007 Cathi Priemer left. The group published their second album Want It, which wasn't as successful as their debut.

== Middle-Europe Tour 2007 ==
In 2007 SheSays supported Bryan Adams at his concerts in Germany and BeNeLux.

== Discography ==
=== Albums ===
Year	Albums	A	GER	CH	BEL	NL	LUX
2006	SheSays	1	–	–	–	–	–
2007	Want it	18	–	–	–	–	–

=== Singles ===
Year	Singles	A	FI	GER	CH	BEL	NL	LUX
2006	Rosegardens	2	–	–	–	–	–	–
2006	SheSays	41	–	–	–	–	–	–
2006	Mountainside	–	–	–	–	–	–	–
2007	Open Your Eyes	39	–	–	–	–	–	–
2007	Save Me	37	11	–	–	–	–	–
