= Excuse Me Moses =

Austrian rock band

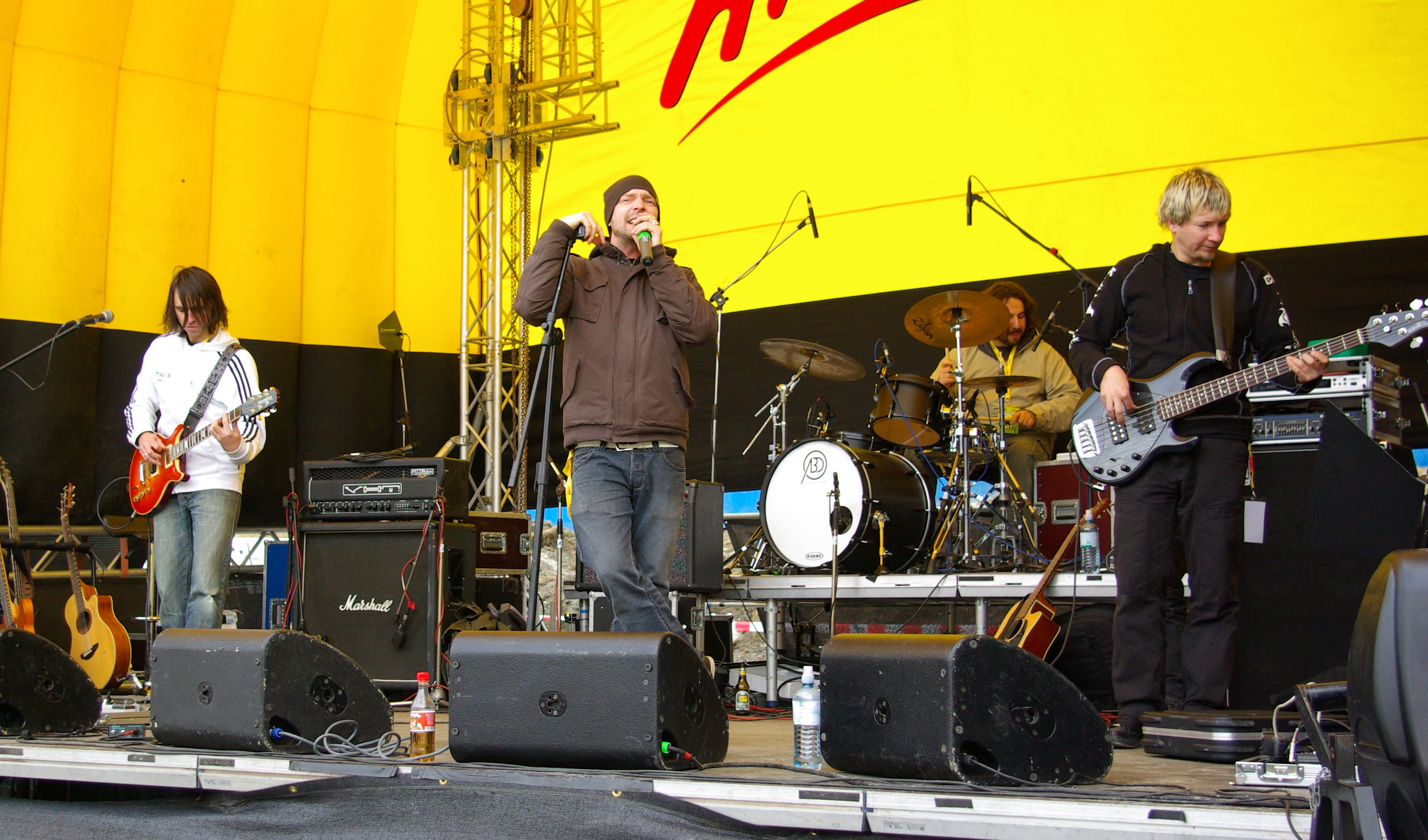
- Excuse Me Moses on 28 March 2008

Background information
- Also known as: Funkalicious (2000-2005)
- Origin: Vienna, Austria
- Genres: Pop rock Pop; Funk rock (early)
- Years active: 2000-present
- Labels: Universal Music
- Members: Michael Paukner (vocals), Dietmar Schrödl (guitars), Gerald Weichselbaum (bass), Martin Scheer (drums)
- Past members: Gerhard Bergauer (drums)
- Website: Official Excuse Me Moses-Homepage

Excuse Me Moses are an Austrian rock band from Vienna. They competed in the Austrian selection process for the Eurovision Song Contest 2011, just narrowly missing out on a spot in the final, after coming 11th in the Online Selection, with the song "Way Out".

== Band story ==
=== Funkalicious ===
The band was formed in 2000 under the name Funkalicious. They produced the EP Deduction in 2002 and released their album Perfekta in 2004 which shortly appeared at #42 in the Austrian charts. They were unable to reach a broad audience with their funk rock music style. After Gerhard Bergauer had left the band in May 2005, Martin Scheer became drummer. Funkalicious redefined themselves as Excuse Me Moses and emphasized their style on rock music.

=== Excuse Me Moses ===
In 2005, the band took part in the Ö3 Soundcheck band contest arranged by the Austrian radio station Hitradio Ö3. They reached third place. In the course of the promotion of the contest, the band played as a warm-up act at a concert of Bon Jovi and Nickelback in Innsbruck in May 2006. Excuse Me Moses signed a record contract and released their single "Summer Sun" which reached #33 in Austria. Some months later, their second single "Not in Love Anymore" was released, but to no success.

Excuse Me Moses released their first album 1st Last Will in June 2007, climbing up to #13 in the Austrian album charts. During this time, a third single was released called "Butterfly Tree/Vital Signs", reaching #20 in the singles chart.

In the same month, they performed their largest gigs at the Austrian Nova Rock festival and the Vienna Donauinselfest.

== Discography ==
=== Albums ===
Year	Albums	Austria
2002	Deduction EP (as Funkalicious)	–
2004	Perfekta (as Funkalicious)	42
2007	1st Last Will	13

=== Singles ===
Year	Singles	Austria
2006	"Summer Sun"	33
2006	"Not in Love Anymore"	–
2007	"Butterfly Tree/Vital Signs"	20
