= Andi Knoll =

Austrian radio and television presenter (born 1972)

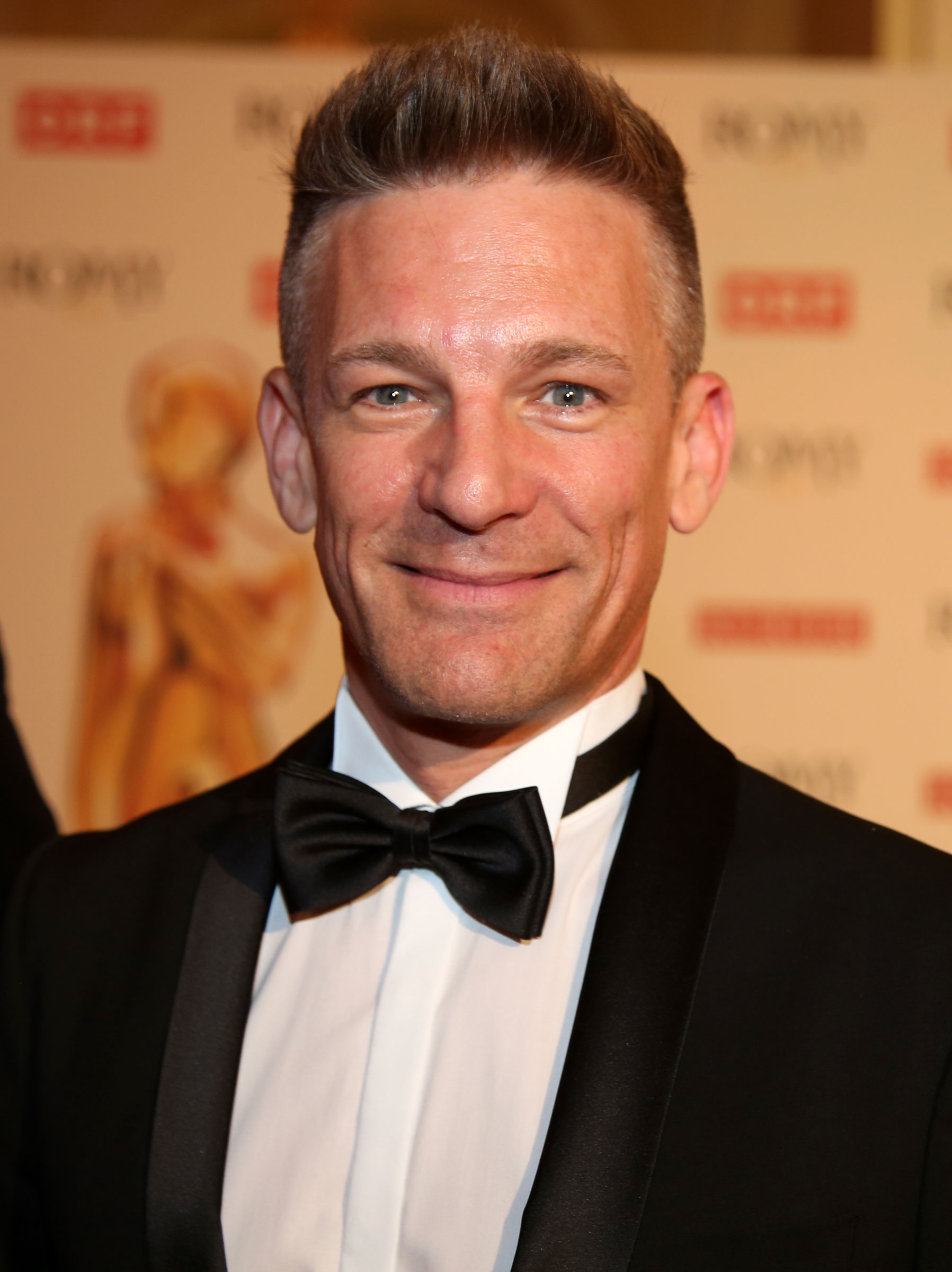
- Born: Andreas Knoll; 11 June 1972 (age 52); Innsbruck, Austria
- Occupation(s): Radio and television presenter

Andreas "Andi" Knoll (born 11 June 1972 in Innsbruck) is an Austrian radio and television presenter. He has served as the Austrian commentator for the Eurovision Song Contest since 1999.

== Eurovision Song Contest ==
Since the 1999 contest (with the exception of 2009) Knoll, following on from radio journalist and actor Ernst Grissemann, has been the Austrian commentator for the Eurovision Song Contest and, since 2002, he has hosted the Austrian national finals for Eurovision. Knoll had also commentated for Austria at the Eurovision Dance Contest.

Following the Austrian victory at the 2014 contest, Knoll was one of the frontrunners to host the 2015 contest, along with the reigning champion Conchita Wurst and the Austrian spokesperson Kati Bellowitsch. However, Knoll was not chosen by ORF but continued in his role as commentator. Bellowitsch was not chosen either and continued her role as spokesperson. Wurst was chosen instead to host the green room.

== Personal life ==
Knoll graduated from the Academy of Commerce in 1992 and has been a radio presenter for Hitradio Ö3 since 1994.
