= Luttenberger*Klug =

Austrian pop duo

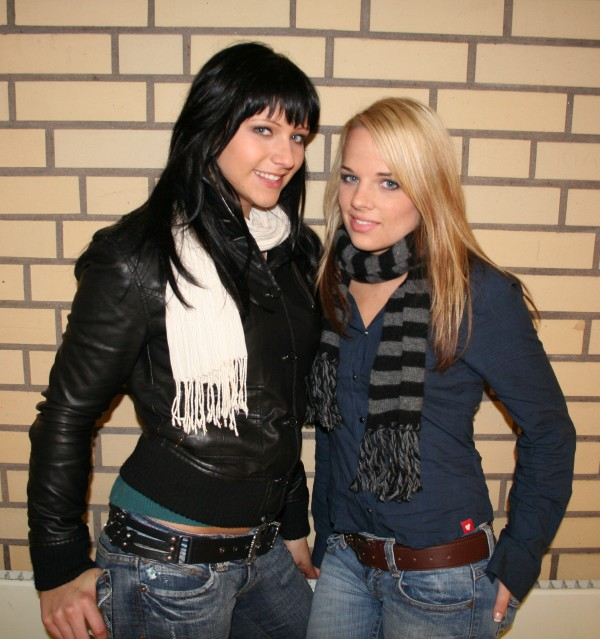

Background information
- Origin: Styria, Austria
- Genres: Pop rock, schlager
- Years active: 2005–present
- Members: Chrissi Klug (Vocals, Guitar), Michelle Luttenberger (Vocals, Keyboards)
- Website: Official site

Luttenberger*Klug is a pop duo from Styria, Austria and consist of Michelle Luttenberger (born 12 July 1990, Feldbach) and Chrissi Klug (born 5 February 1989, Deutschlandsberg).

Their music style fits in well into the Austropop-movement, lying somewhere between pop and rock. The band is produced by Alexander Kahr who also produced another famous Austrian singer, Christina Stürmer.

== Biography ==
In 2005, Chrissi and Michelle met at a concert of Chrissi's band, a short time later they decided to establish their own group and became famous in Germany by TV stations. In Austria they got very famous with the song Super Sommer (2005). Initially not very successful, however it became a hit when it was re-released in Austria and Germany one year later. The following single was "Vergiss Mich" (English: Forget me) which entered the Austrian Top 40 and the German Top 100.

The first album, "Mach Dich Bereit" was released on 23 February 2007 and hit the Austrian charts for 25 weeks. Their biggest concert to date was attended live at Brandenburg Gate in Berlin and broadcast by RTL Television. On the Austrian Amadeus Awards of 2007, they won under the category "single of the year" with the song "Vergiss Mich".

The second album "Mädchen im Regen" (Girl in the rain) ( English lyrics ) was released on 21 November 2008.

Their single "Fliegen" was released as a summer hit on 19 June 2009. The music video for the song was taken on a building rooftop in Berlin, right above the Alexanderplatz.

The single "Zeig mir den Weg" was released on 29 October for the animated Bible series "Chi Rho". Their single "Immer wenn du schläfst" from their new album "Unsere Zeit" was released on 19 November 2010. The album "Unsere Zeit" was released on 25 February 2011.

== Discography ==
Singles and albums by Luttenberger*klug with charts positions.

=== Singles ===
Year	Single	Album	Austria	Austria (Austro-Hits)	Germany
2005(AT)/2006(GER)	"Super Sommer"	Mach dich bereit!	28	1	44
2006(AT)/2007(GER)	"Vergiss mich"	Mach dich bereit	6	1	29
2009(AT)/2009(GER)	"Mädchen im Regen"	Mädchen im Regen	27	1	
2009(AT)/2009(GER)	"Sag doch einfach"	Mädchen im Regen	14	1	
2009(AT)/2009(GER)	"Fliegen"	-	38	1	

=== Albums ===
Year	Album	Austria	Germany
2007	Mach dich bereit!	5	68
2009	Mädchen im Regen	27	-
2010	Unsere Zeit	15	-

== Gallery ==
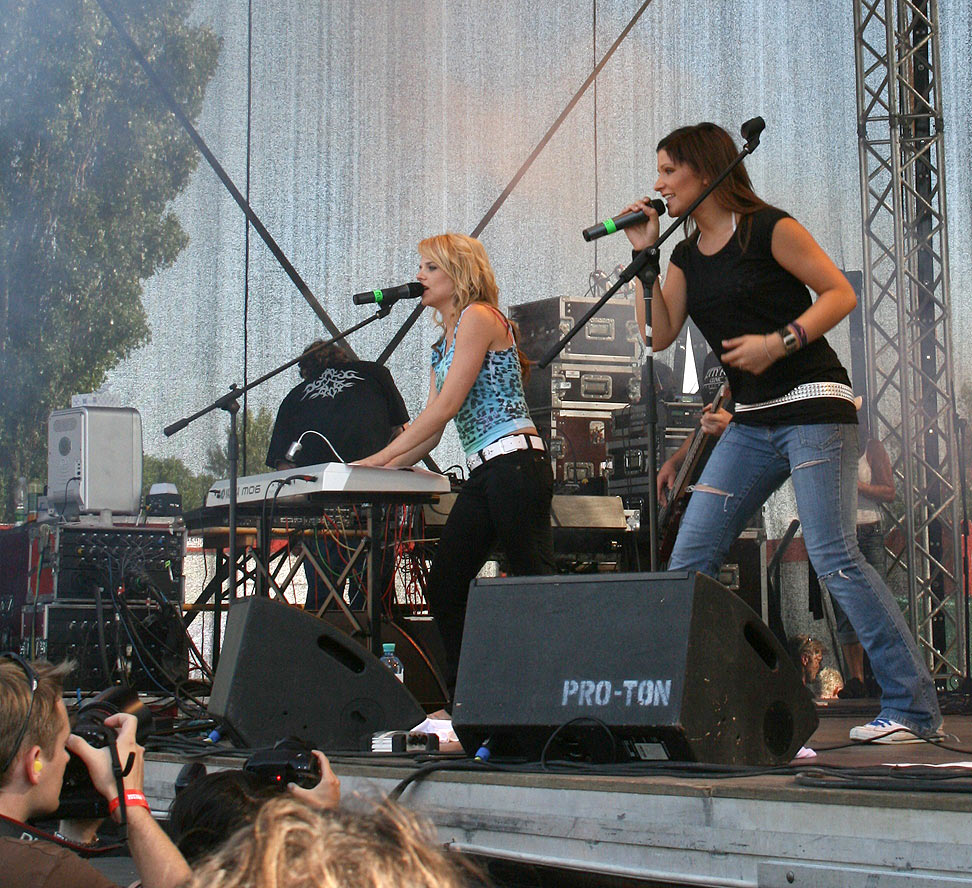
Luttenberger*Klug at Donauinselfest 2007

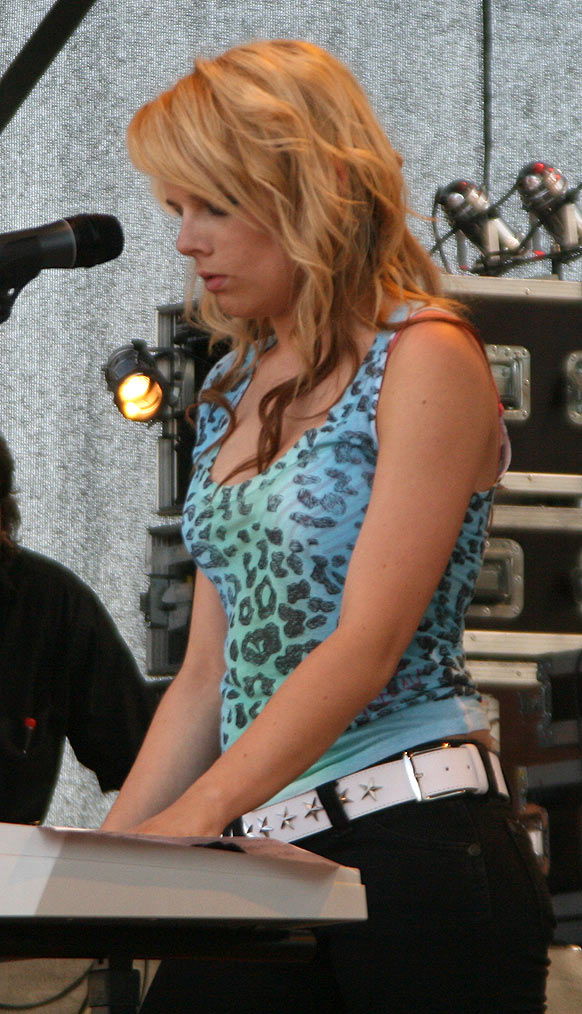
Michelle Luttenberger

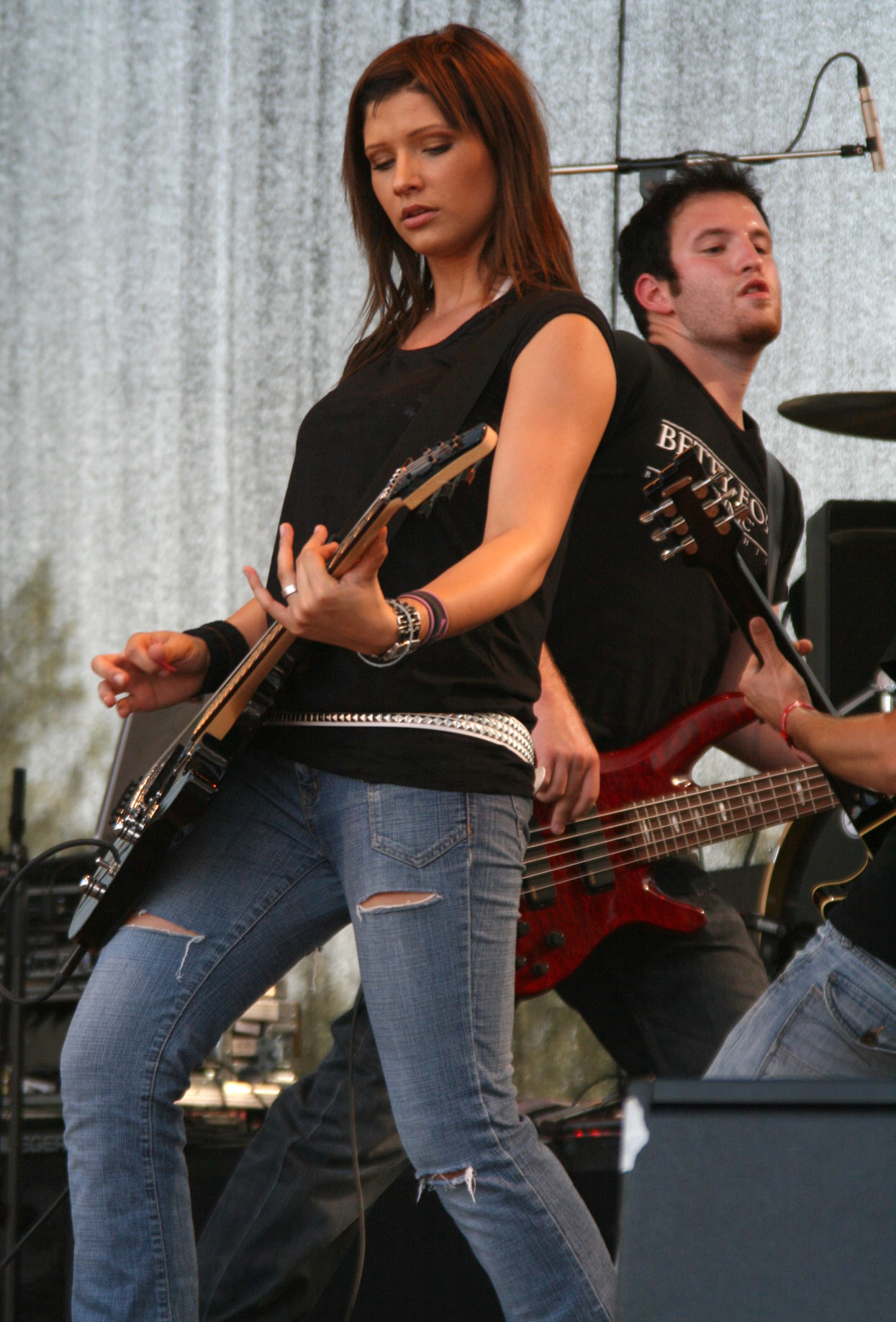
Chrissi Klug
