= Austria in the Eurovision Song Contest 2020 =

- Eurovision Song Contest 2020
- Participating broadcaster: Österreichischer Rundfunk (ORF)
- Country: Austria
- Selection process: Internal selection
- Announcement date: Artist: 12 December 2019; Song: 5 March 2020

Competing entry
- Song: "Alive"
- Artist: Vincent Bueno
- Songwriters: Vincent Bueno; David "Davey" Yang; Felix van Göns; Artur Aigner

Placement
- Final result: Contest cancelled

Participation chronology

Austria was set to be represented at the Eurovision Song Contest 2020 with the song "Alive", written by Vincent Bueno, David "Davey" Yang, Felix van Göns, and Artur Aigner, and performed by Bueno himself. The Austrian participating broadcaster, Österreichischer Rundfunk (ORF), internally selected its entry for the contest.

Austria was drawn to compete in the second semi-final of the Eurovision Song Contest which took place on 14 May 2020. However, the contest was cancelled due to the COVID-19 pandemic.

== Background ==
Prior to the 2020 contest, Austria has participated in the Eurovision Song Contest fifty-two times since its first entry in 1957. The nation has won the contest on two occasions: in 1966 with the song "Merci, Chérie" performed by Udo Jürgens and in 2014 with the song "Rise Like a Phoenix" performed by Conchita Wurst. Following the introduction of semi-finals for the 2004 contest, Austria has featured in only seven finals. Austria's least successful result has been last place, which they have achieved on eight occasions, most recently in 2012. Austria has also received nul points on four occasions; in 1962, 1988, 1991 and 2015.

The Austrian national broadcaster, Österreichischer Rundfunk (ORF), broadcasts the event within Austria and organises the selection process for the nation's entry. ORF confirmed their intentions to participate at the 2020 Eurovision Song Contest on 25 May 2019. From 2011 to 2013 as well as in 2015 and 2016, ORF set up national finals with several artists to choose both the song and performer to compete at Eurovision for Austria, with both the public and a panel of jury members involved in the selection. In 2014 and since 2017, ORF has held an internal selection to choose the artist and song to represent Austria at the contest.

== Before Eurovision ==
=== Internal selection ===
Artists were nominated by the ORF Eurovision Song Contest Team led by ORF chief editor Stefan Zechner, which collaborated with music expert Eberhard Forcher who worked on the selection of the Austrian entries since 2016, to submit songs to the broadcaster. On 12 December 2019, "Alive" performed by Vincent Bueno was announced by ORF as the Austrian entry for the Eurovision Song Contest 2020. Bueno had previously attempted to represent Austria at the Eurovision Song Contest in 2016 by competing in the national final with the song "All We Need Is That Love". After being selected to represent Austria in the Eurovision Song Contest 2020, Bueno said, "Wow, even thinking about the fact that I am going to participate in the song contest gives me goosebumps [...] it is breathtaking and formidable. Let’s go Austria!" "Alive" was selected from three shortlisted entries by Forcher and the ORF Eurovision Team, which also included the song "Judgement Day" performed by Thea Devy. Devy would later compete in the 2020 Serbian national final with the same song but performed in the Serbian language.

"Alive" was written by Vincent Bueno himself together with David "Davey" Yang, Felix van Göns and Artur Aigner. The presentation of the song took place on 5 March 2020 during the radio show Ö3-Wecker, aired on Ö3. In regards to the song, Bueno stated: "The song itself has undergone massive evolution and got a good push in the final sprint. I worked with very young producers and composers, who will definitely be involved in the Austrian music scene in the future. While the song was being created, everyone on the team was able to experience how much the song was evolving, especially when everyone freed themselves from their own egos and opened up to each other."

== At Eurovision ==
According to Eurovision rules, all nations with the exceptions of the host country and the "Big Five" (France, Germany, Italy, Spain and the United Kingdom) are required to qualify from one of two semi-finals in order to compete for the final; the top ten countries from each semi-final progress to the final. The European Broadcasting Union (EBU) split up the competing countries into six different pots based on voting patterns from previous contests, with countries with favourable voting histories put into the same pot. On 28 January 2020, a special allocation draw was held which placed each country into one of the two semi-finals, as well as which half of the show they would perform in. Austria was placed into the second semi-final, which was to be held on 14 May 2020, and was scheduled to perform in the second half of the show. However, due to the COVID-19 pandemic, the contest was cancelled.
