= Philipp Hansa =

Austrian radio presenter and actor (born 1990)

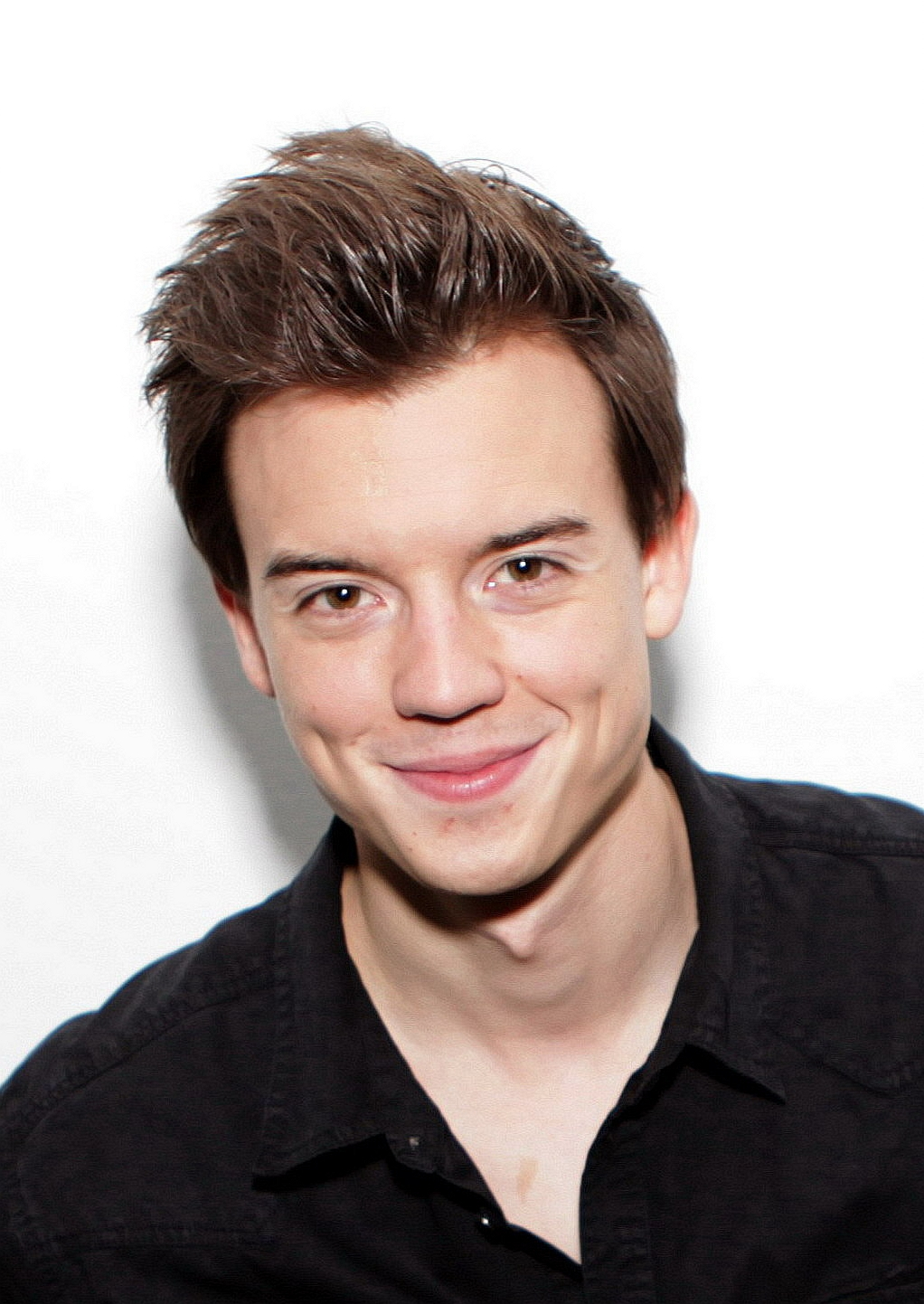
- Hansa in 2015
- Born: 3 June 1990 (age 35); Graz, Austria
- Occupations: Radio presenter; actor

Philipp Hansa (born 3 June 1990) is an Austrian radio presenter and actor.

He has starred in films like Das Fest der Liebe (2012). After graduating in 2011, Hansa started working for the radio station HITRADIO Ö3, he has been both a radio presenter on the radio station as well as an actor in radio plays as the character Hansmann. Since February 2015 Hansa is presenting the morning show on the station.

Hansa has presented the jury votes from Austria in the Eurovision Song Contest since 2019, and is notable for wearing the same T-shirt with the word "Equality" on it every year.
