= Hitradio Ö3 =

- Austria
- Broadcast area: Austria; Italy (South Tyrol)
- Frequencies: FM: 87.9 – 103.9 MHz, DVB-S, DVB-C, Internet, DAB+ (South Tyrol only)
- RDS: OE 3

Programming
- Language: German
- Format: Adult contemporary, news, entertainment

Ownership
- Owner: ORF
- Sister stations: Ö1, FM4

History
- First air date: 1 October 1967; 58 years ago

Technical information
- Licensing authority: RTR
- ERP: >750 kW (combined)

Links
- Webcast: Web Stream
- Website: oe3.orf.at

Hitradio Ö3 is one of the nationwide radio stations of Austria's public broadcaster ORF. The format focuses, since a reform in the late 1990s almost exclusively, on contemporary hit radio, specialising in pop music and chart hits from the 1980s to the present. Ö3 has by far the biggest audience share (averaging 31%) of all Austrian radio stations.

== History ==
The station was launched by the ORF broadcaster on 1 October 1967 to a new numbered system, together with the classical music station Österreich 1 and the local radios of the Ö2 group, following a 1964 national referendum against the alignment of the public broadcasting service on the Austrian political Proporz system. The journalist and radio host Ernst Grissemann was commissioned to build up an entertainment station; he was supported by Frank Elstner, who had worked for Radio Luxembourg, and André Heller presenting the Musicbox avant-garde music journal. Grissemann served as programme director until 1979, known as "Mister Ö3".

A 24-hour programme was introduced in 1977, including hourly news broadcasts, weather forecasts, and traffic news in co-operation with the public ASFiNAG transport company. In the 1980s the popular Ö3-Wecker morning show was also aired by the German Sender Freies Berlin broadcaster.

Unlike the present-day format radio programme, the Ö3 schedules initially comprised alternative genres and many specialist music shows, with radio hosts like satirists Gerhard Bronner and Stermann & Grissemann, singer-songwriter Ludwig Hirsch or theatre director Axel Corti. While Schlager music was proscribed, the station played a vital role in promoting German-language Austropop tunes. Since a reorganization of ORF's radio channels in 1996, shortly before the introduction in Austria of private commercial radio, alternative programmes have been moved to Ö1 or the newly established FM4 young-adult radio station.

== Operation ==
Since 1997, Ö3 has broadcast from a large office floor in the Heiligenstadt district of Vienna. Transmissions include the survey of the Austrian record charts, since 1967 presented by the weekly Austria Top 40 programme. Current renowned presenters include Andi Knoll, Katharina Bellowitsch and Philipp Hansa. Band contests like Ö3-Soundcheck promoted the career of Austrian music groups such as SheSays, Luttenberger*Klug, Mondscheiner, and Excuse Me Moses. The station participates in the annual Donauinselfest music festival, the Licht ins Dunkel telethon and co-operates with the Austrian Red Cross.

Ö3 On-Screen-Design 2008

The station also broadcasts via satellite television, with a display showing the previous, current and upcoming tracks, the time and other information such as traffic reports. The station's website provides latest reports and information, record charts, a studio webcam, streaming audio, and a daily playlist reaching back to 2009. Several broadcasts are available as podcasts.

Ö3 was for a long time the only ORF station permitted to broadcast commercials, and it remains the station with the largest reach and amount of advertising time per day, more than all private radio stations together. For this reason it is often called "ORF's cash cow".

== See also ==
- List of radio stations in Austria and Liechtenstein
