= Diehl (surname) =

Family name

Diehl is a German surname. Notable people with the surname include:

== Arts ==
- Arthur Diehl (1870–1929), English impressionist landscape artist
- Carol Diehl, American artist, art critic and poet
- Guy Diehl (born 1949), American painter
- Gaston Diehl (1912–1999), French professor of art history and art critic
- Hanns Diehl (1877–1946), German-Austrian painter
- Volker Diehl (born 1957), German art gallery owner

== Acting ==
- August Diehl (born 1976), German actor
- John Diehl (actor) (born 1950), American character actor
- Karl Ludwig Diehl (1896–1958), German film actor

== Entertainment ==
- Aaron Diehl (born 1985), American jazz pianist
- Alden Diehl (1931–2000), Canadian radio executive and comedian
- Alex Diehl (born 1987), German singer and songwriter
- Alice M. Diehl (1844-1912), English musician and writer
- Caroline Diehl, British media executive

== Politics ==
- Conrad Diehl (1843–1918), American politician, mayor of Buffalo
- Geoff Diehl (born 1969), American politician in Massachusetts
- Guida Diehl (1868–1961), German Nazi party official
- John Diehl (politician) (born 1965), American politician in Missouri
- William J. Diehl (1845–1929), American industrialist and politician, mayor of Pittsburgh

== Science ==
- René Diehl (1912–1980), French archaeologist
- Renee Diehl, American physicist
- Richard Diehl (born 1940), American archaeologist, anthropologist and academic
- William Webster Diehl (1891–1978), American mycologist

== Sports ==
- Carl Diehl (1904–1997), American college football player
- Daniel Diehl (born 2005), American swimmer
- Dave Diehl (1918–1994), American football player
- David Diehl (born 1980), American football player
- Ella Diehl (born 1978), Russian badminton player
- Ernie Diehl (1877–1958), American baseball player
- Ernst Diehl (born 1949), German footballer
- George Diehl (1918–1986), American baseball player
- John Diehl (American football) (1936–2012), American football player
- Phillip Diehl (born 1994), American baseball player
- Terry Diehl (born 1949), American golfer
- Wally Diehl (1905–1954), American football player

== Other ==
- Charles Diehl (1859–1944), French historian
- Edith Diehl (1876–1953), American bookbinder
- Harold S. Diehl (1891–1973), American physician and anti-smoking activist
- Jackson Diehl (born 1956), American journalist
- James Diehl (1937–2025), American minister and general superintendent in the Church of the Nazarene
- Huston Diehl (1948–2010), American professor in Iowa
- Karl Diehl (economist) (1864–1943), German economist
- Mekayla Diehl (born 1988), American beauty pageant titleholder
- Philip Diehl (inventor) (1847–1913), German-American mechanical engineer and inventor
- Philip N. Diehl (born 1951), American businessman, director of the United States Mint
- Pony Diehl (c. 1848–1888), American outlaw in the New Mexico Territory and Arizona Territory
- Sarah Diehl (born 1978), German author
- Walter Stuart Diehl (1893–1976), U.S. Navy officer and aerodynamics and aircraft designer
- William Diehl (1924–2006), American novelist and photojournalist

== See also ==
- Diehl (disambiguation)
- Dahl (surname)
