= Karl Diehl =

Karl Diehl may refer to:

- Karl Ludwig Diehl (1896–1958), German film actor
- Karl Diehl (economist) (1864–1943), German economist and professor

== See also ==
- Carl Diehl (1904–1997), American college football player
- Diehl (disambiguation)
