= Harrison Township, Bedford County, Pennsylvania =

Township in Pennsylvania, US

Coordinates: 39°57′12″N 78°37′55″W

- Township
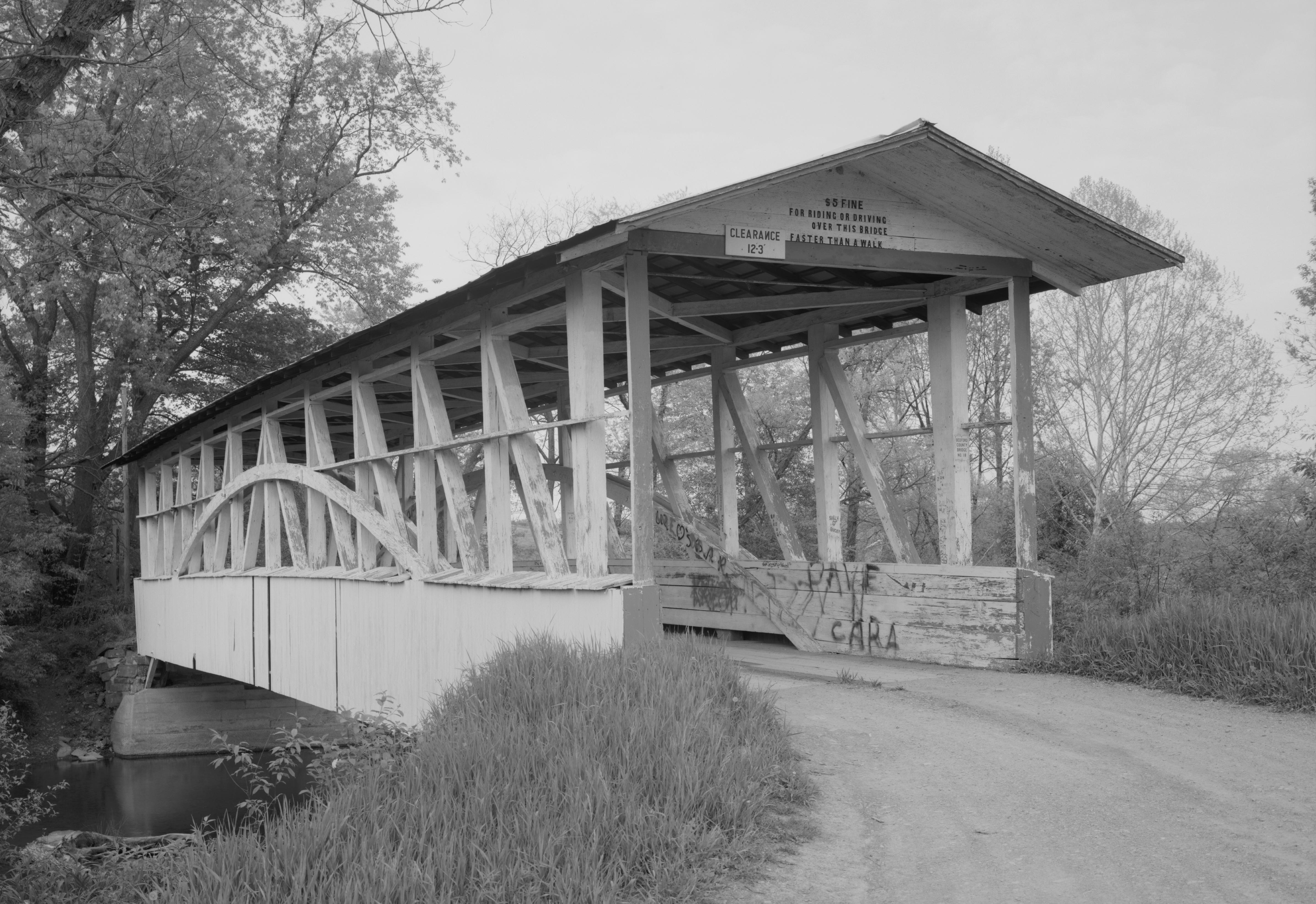
- Diehls Covered Bridge

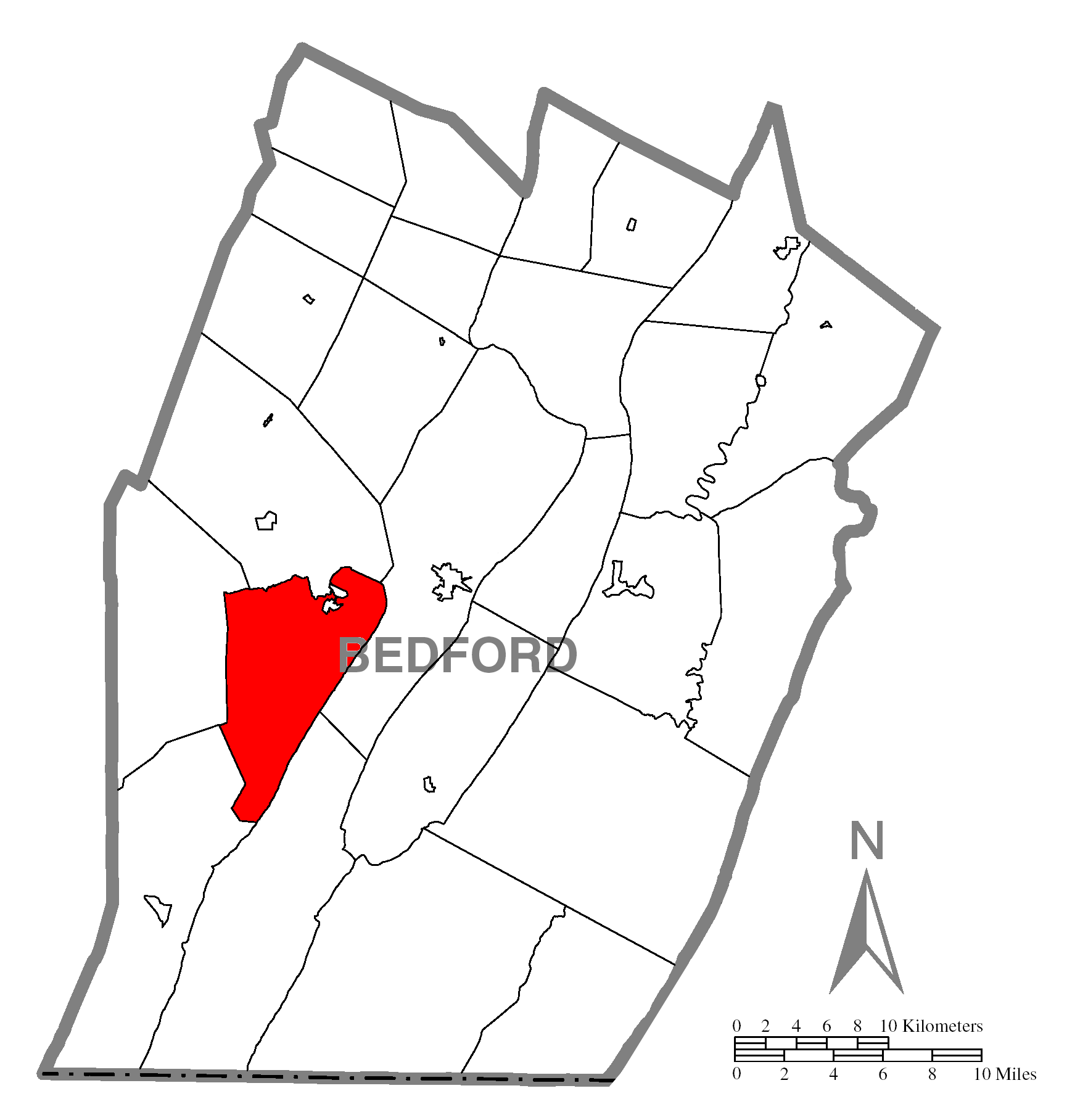
- Map of Bedford County, Pennsylvania highlighting Bloomfield Township

- Map of Bedford County, Pennsylvania
- Country: United States
- State: Pennsylvania
- County: Bedford
- Settled: 1795
- Incorporated: 1840

Area
  - Total: 37.09 sq mi (96.06 km^{2})
  - Land: 37.06 sq mi (95.98 km^{2})
  - Water: 0.035 sq mi (0.09 km^{2})

Population (2020)
  - Total: 933 ▼
  - Estimate (2023): 920
  - Density: 24.9/sq mi (9.63/km^{2})
- Time zone: UTC-5 (Eastern (EST))
  - Summer (DST): UTC-4 (EDT)
- Area code: 814
- FIPS code: 42-009-32840

Harrison Township is a township in Bedford County, Pennsylvania, United States. The population was 933 at the 2020 census.

== History ==
The Diehls Covered Bridge and Heirline Covered Bridge were listed on the National Register of Historic Places in 1980.

== Geography ==
Harrison Township is located in western Bedford County. It is bordered by Bedford Township to the east, Cumberland Valley Township to the southeast, Londonderry Township to the southwest, Juniata Township to the west, and Napier Township to the north. The borough of Manns Choice is along the northern border but is not part of the township. The eastern border of the township follows the crest of Wills Mountain, and the northern border is the Raystown Branch of the Juniata River.

Pennsylvania Route 31 runs along the northern edge of Harrison Township, extending from the township's northwestern border with Juniata Township to the northeastern border with Napier Township. For this entire stretch, Route 31 parallels the Raystown Branch of the Juniata River.

According to the United States Census Bureau, the township has a total area of 37.09 square miles (96.06 km^{2}), of which 37.06 square miles (95.98 km^{2}) is land and 0.035 square miles (0.09 km^{2}), or 0.09%, is water.

== Recreation ==
Portions of the Pennsylvania State Game Lands Number 48 is located in the township.

== Demographics ==
Historical population
Census	Pop.	Note	%±
2010	972		—
2020	933		−4.0%
2023 (est.)	920		−1.4%
U.S. Decennial Census

As of the census of 2000, there were 1,007 people, 385 households, and 296 families living in the township. The population density was 26.7 inhabitants per square mile (10.3/km^{2}). There were 600 housing units at an average density of 15.9 per square mile (6.1/km^{2}). The racial makeup of the township was 99.11% White, 0.10% African American, 0.40% Asian, 0.20% Pacific Islander, and 0.20% from two or more races. Hispanic or Latino of any race were 0.40% of the population.

There were 385 households, out of which 30.9% had children under the age of 18 living with them, 67.0% were married couples living together, 6.0% had a female householder with no husband present, and 22.9% were non-families. 20.3% of all households were made up of individuals, and 10.6% had someone living alone who was 65 years of age or older. The average household size was 2.55 and the average family size was 2.91.

In the township the population was spread out, with 24.0% under the age of 18, 6.5% from 18 to 24, 25.3% from 25 to 44, 24.7% from 45 to 64, and 19.5% who were 65 years of age or older. The median age was 41 years. For every 100 females there were 104.7 males. For every 100 females age 18 and over, there were 102.9 males.

The median income for a household in the township was $35,000, and the median income for a family was $37,552. Males had a median income of $27,237 versus $19,875 for females. The per capita income for the township was $16,182. About 3.7% of families and 7.3% of the population were below the poverty line, including 9.1% of those under age 18 and 6.4% of those age 65 or over.
