= Diehl =

Diehl may refer to:

== People ==
- Diehl (surname), a German surname

=== Given name ===
- Diehl Mateer (1928–2012), American squash player

== Companies ==
- Diehl Aerospace GmbH, a German aerospace company
- Diehl Defence GmbH & Co. KG, a German arms manufacturer
- Diehl Film, German filmmaking business (c. 1937–1970)
- Diehl Metall Stiftung & Co. KG, a German metal processing company
- House of Diehl, a New York–based fashion partnership
- Diehl (company), a german corporate group headquartered in Nuremberg

== Military ==
- Diehl DM-41, a military projectile
- USNS Walter S. Diehl (T-AO-193), a U.S. Navy fleet replenishment oiler in service since 1988

== See also ==
- Diehls Covered Bridge, in Bedford County, Pennsylvania
- George Diehl Homestead, in Cherryhill Township, Indiana County, Pennsylvania
- Oscar C. Diehl House, in Midland, Michigan
