= Joco (disambiguation) =

Joco or JoCo is a nickname for Jonathan Coulton (born 1970), singer.

Joco may also refer to:

- Jo Coburn (born 1968), journalist and TV presenter
- Joco (duo), German musical duo
- Joco McDonnell, a Shaman King character
- Johnson County, Kansas, nicknamed JoCo
