= Luxuslärm =

German pop band

Luxuslärm is a German pop-rock group from Iserlohn.

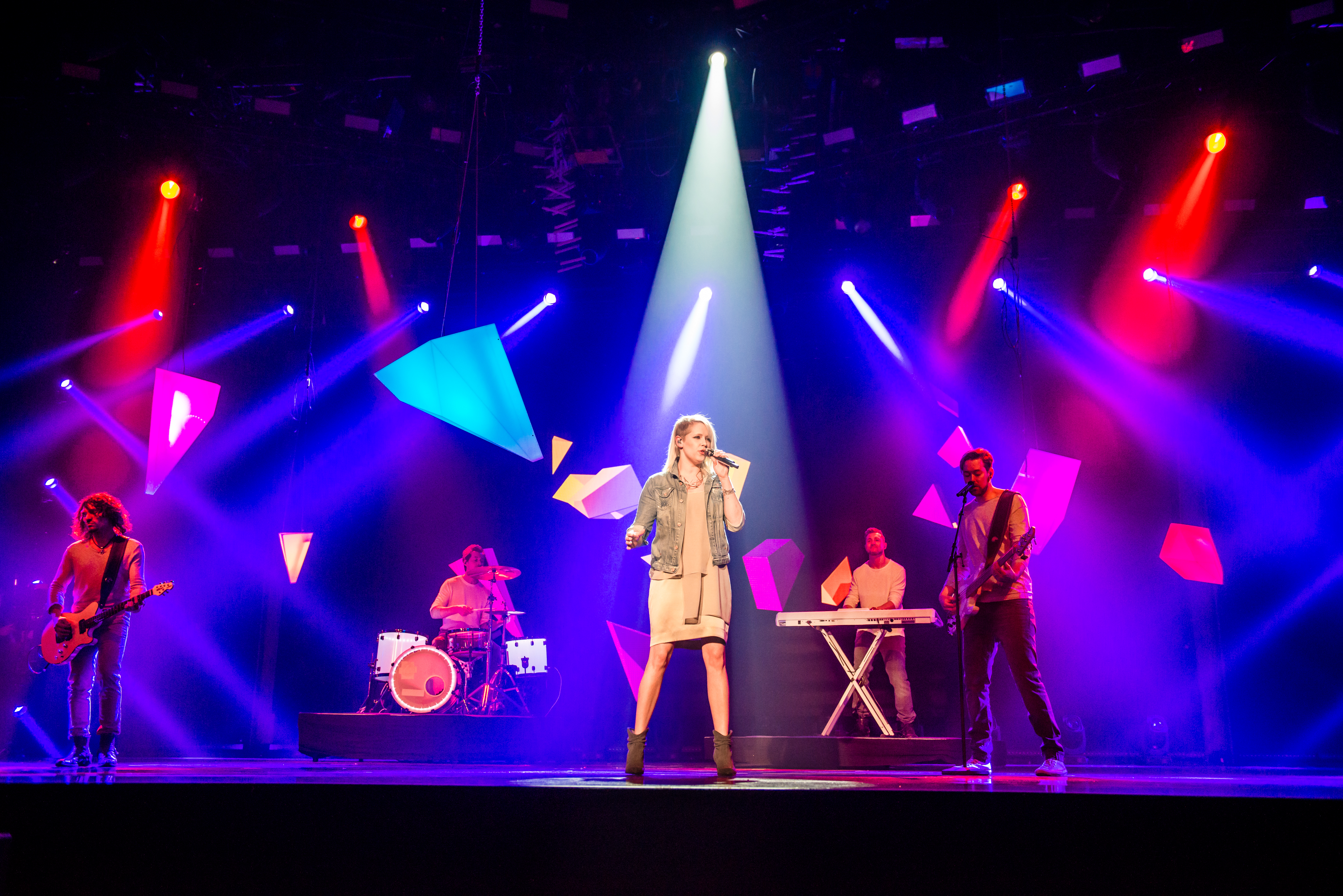
Luxuslärm in Köln 2016

== History ==
The band was founded in 2003 as Blue Cinnamon, playing covers. In 2007, under the name Luxuslärm, the group won the NRW Rock It contest. In 2008, the band won several German Pop and Rock Music Association awards.

The group was selected as one of ten artists to compete in the German qualifiers for the Eurovision Song Contest 2016. German televoters however didn't select the band's entry Solange Liebe in mir wohnt (lit. "As long as love lives within me") into the final of three.

== Discography ==
- 2008 - 1000 km bis zum Meer
- 2010 - So laut ich kann
- 2011 - Carousel
- 2014 - Alles was du willst
- 2016 - Fallen und Fliegen

== Members ==
- Janine 'Jini' Meyer (vocals) - since 2006
- Jan Zimmer (drums) - since 2006
- Freddy Hau (guitar) - since 2011
- Christian Besch (keyboard) - since 2011
- David Müller (bass) - since 2011

== Former members ==
- David Rempel (keyboard/guitar) - 2006 to 2011
- Eugen Urlacher (bass) - 2006 to 2011
- Henrik Oberbossel (guitar) - 2006 to 2011
