= Heirline Covered Bridge =

- U.S. National Register of Historic Places
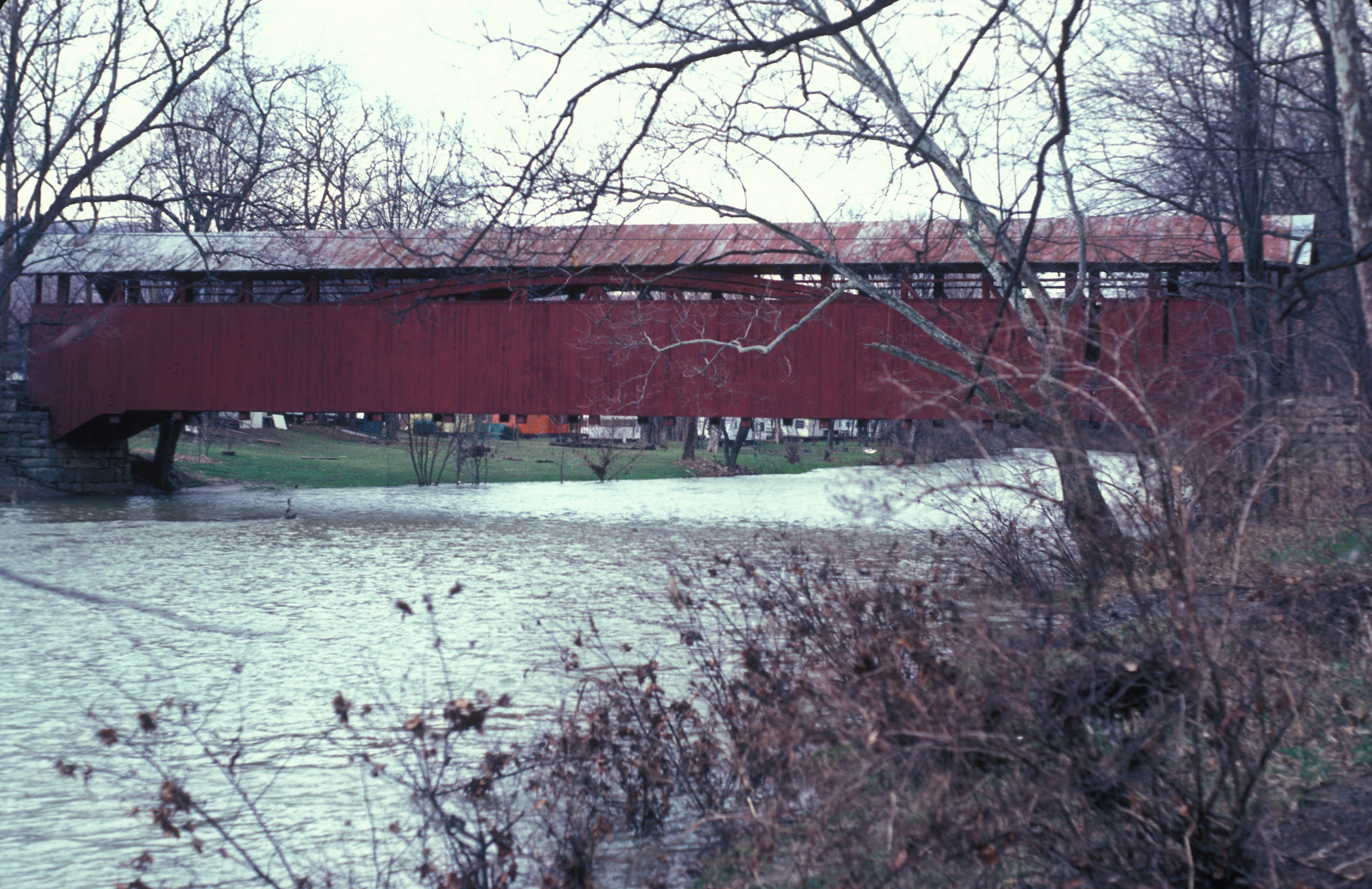

- Location within Pennsylvania Location within the United States
- Location: West of Bedford on Legislative Route 05097, north of Manns Choice, Harrison Township and Napier Township, Pennsylvania
- Coordinates: 40°1′0″N 78°35′37″W
- Area: less than one acre
- MPS
- NRHP reference No.: 80003419
- Added to NRHP: April 10, 1980

The Heirline Covered Bridge is an historic wooden covered bridge which is located in Harrison Township and Napier Township in Bedford County, Pennsylvania.

It crosses the Juniata River, and is one of fifteen historic covered bridges which are located in Bedford County.

It was listed on the National Register of Historic Places in 1980.

== History and architectural features ==
Built in 1902, this historic structure is a 136-foot-long (41 m), Burr Truss bridge with a medium pitched gable roof. It crosses the Juniata River, and is one of fifteen historic covered bridges which are located in Bedford County.

It was listed on the National Register of Historic Places in 1980.
