= Mystery of a Blood Red Rose =

2015 song by Avantasia

Single by Avantasia

from the album Ghostlights
- Released: 11 December 2015
- Length: 3:51
- Label: Nuclear Blast Records
- Songwriter(s): Tobias Sammet
- Producer(s): Sascha Paeth and Tobias Sammet

Avantasia singles chronology
"Sleepwalking" (2013)	"Mystery of a Blood Red Rose" (2015)

"Mystery of a Blood Red Rose" is a single and opening track to the German power metal project Avantasia's album Ghostlights, released on 11 December 2015 with a lyric video. It was one of the ten candidates to represent Germany at the Eurovision Song Contest 2016. The song was between the final three finalists, but eventually was defeated by "Ghost", performed by Jamie-Lee Kriewitz.

== Composing and recording ==
Tobias Sammet, the project's leader and songwriter, described the song as "sumptuous" and similar to "Meat Loaf around 1979 or at most 1990". He also said:

In my humble opinion is the perfect overture to the seventy-minute journey which the full album is going to be. Although Mystery of a Blood Red Rose is a rather short composition compared to most other Avantasia songs, yet I wanted to embellish and amplify it with flamboyance and all Avantasia trademarks. I wanted to make it a detailed piece of fantasy art, but at the same time it was a big challenge to make that painting look inherently consistent if you view it from the distance. The layered choirs took us forever to record and yet nothing distracts from the main theme and flow of the song. Everytime you give it a listen you will discover something else going on.

Indeed, the choirs took a total 14 hours to record. Meat Loaf was initially set to sing on the song, and his management was already in the process of approving it. However, they ultimately decided to decline for unknown reasons. The song was still no more than a single chorus when the idea of having him sing on it was first raised, but a more complete version of it was sent to him.

Commenting on the reasons he chose the song as the single, he said it was either it or "Draconian Love", since both are "very catchy" and "had a solid playtime to release them as a single". The label favored the opening track, which Sammet liked as the song was more "daring" due to its "timelessness" and "old-fashioned" tone.

== Eurovision 2016 ==
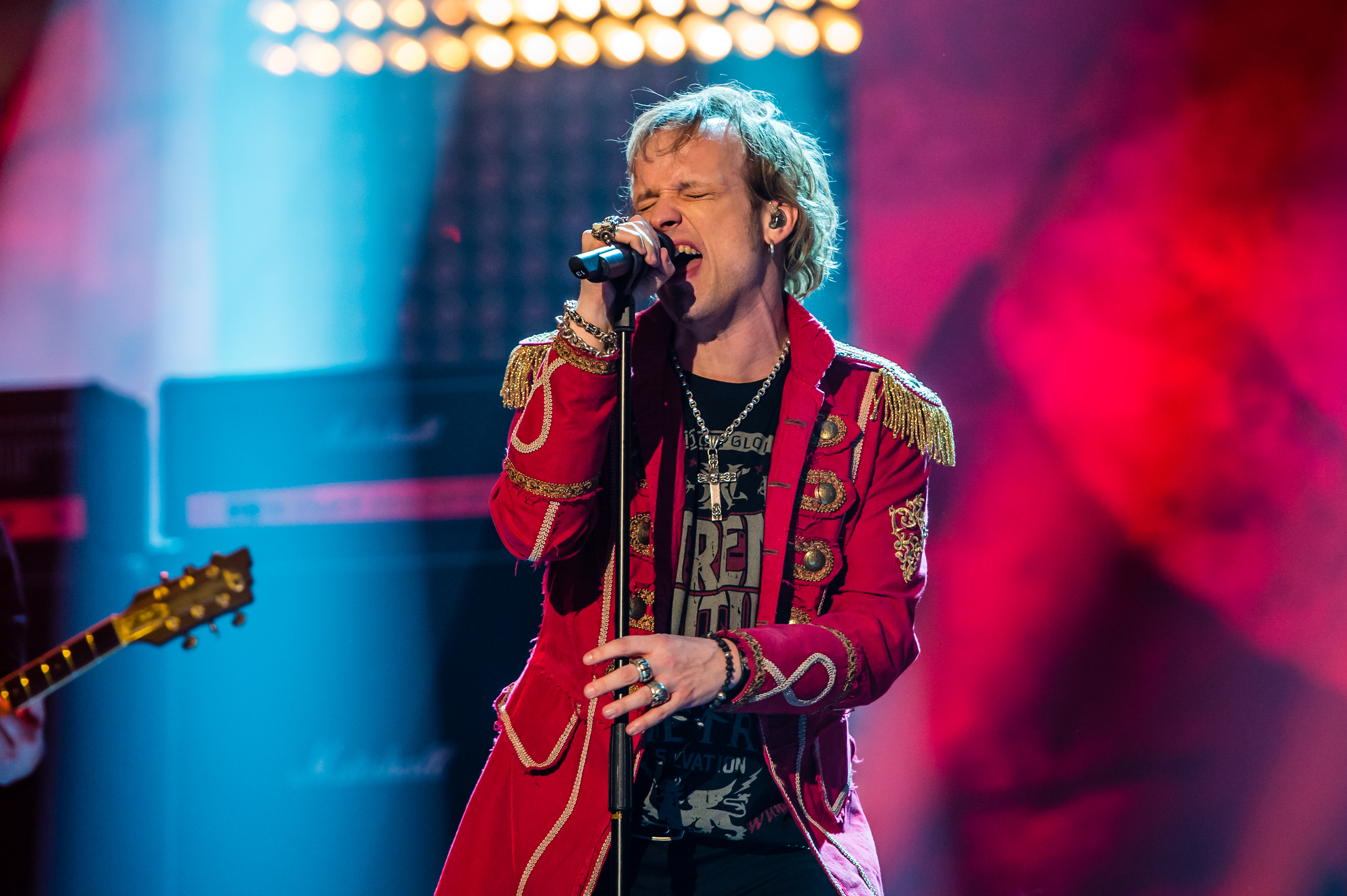
Avantasia performing "Mystery of a Blood Red Rose" at "Unser Lied für Stockholm".

"Mystery of a Blood Red Rose" was selected among nine other songs as a candidate to represent Germany at the Eurovision Song Contest 2016. Sammet said it could be a great promotional opportunity and commented:

To me it means that I can play my music in front of an audience that conceivably don't know that an act like us still exists. And this is a beautiful, selfish motivation (laughs). [...] I like the idea of keeping the flag high for this kind of music [...] and it is a music genre, that doesn't get much attention in the mass media.

When asked if he was afraid conservative fans would dislike Avantasia's participation due to the pop, commercial nature of Eurovision, Sammet replied:

What kind of Metal band are we, if we would worry about what is proper or not ?(laughs) Seriously, my favorite bands also didn't ask me for permission on doing such things. Iron Maiden attended "Top of the Pops", as well as AC/DC back then. This had no bad influence on the sound of AC/DC or on their career. At the end of the day the Eurovision Song Contest won't have any influence on the things I'm doing.

He remarked it will be "weird" to compete with other people in art, which he sees as "subjective".

The song was between the three songs competing in the final of "Unser Lied für Stockholm". In the final round, "Mystery of a Blood Red Rose" received 21.6% of the public vote, finishing in third place. The song "Ghost", performed by Jamie-Lee Kriewitz, was chosen as the German representative in the Eurovision Song Contest 2016.

The song was chosen as the German entry for the OGAE Second Chance Contest 2016, where it finished in tenth place.

== Personnel ==
- Tobias Sammet - lead vocals, additional keyboards and bass
- Sascha Paeth - lead and rhythm guitar, bass, additional keyboards, engineering and mixing
- Michael Rodenberg - orchestration, keyboards, mastering
- Felix Bohnke - drums
