= Laura Pinski =

German singer (born 1996)

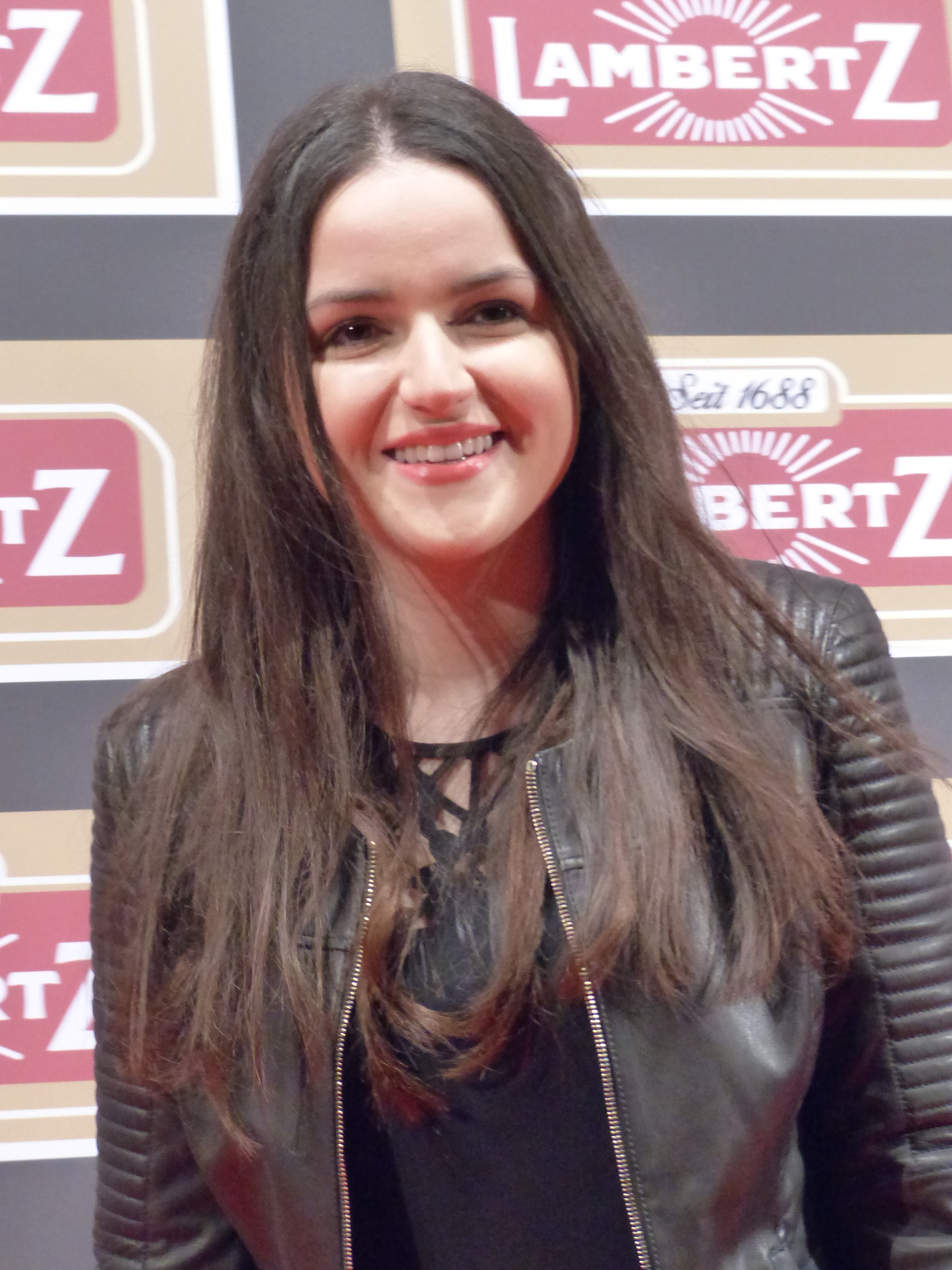
- Pinksi in 2016

Background information
- Born: 1996 (age 28–29); Düsseldorf, Germany
- Genres: Pop
- Occupation: Singer

Laura Pinski (born 30 August 1996 in Düsseldorf) is a German singer.

== Career ==
Pinski was born in Düsseldorf; at the age of nine, she was diagnosed with skeleton-cancer. During that time she also discovered her interest for singing. She currently is studying law.

In 2012 Pinski placed fifth in the talent show Das Supertalent with 8,30% in the final. In 2016 she participated in the German national final for the Eurovision Song Contest 2016 She missed out of a place in the top 3 after placing 4th in first round she gained 11.11% of the Public Vote.
