= Cuppett's Covered Bridge =

- U.S. National Register of Historic Places
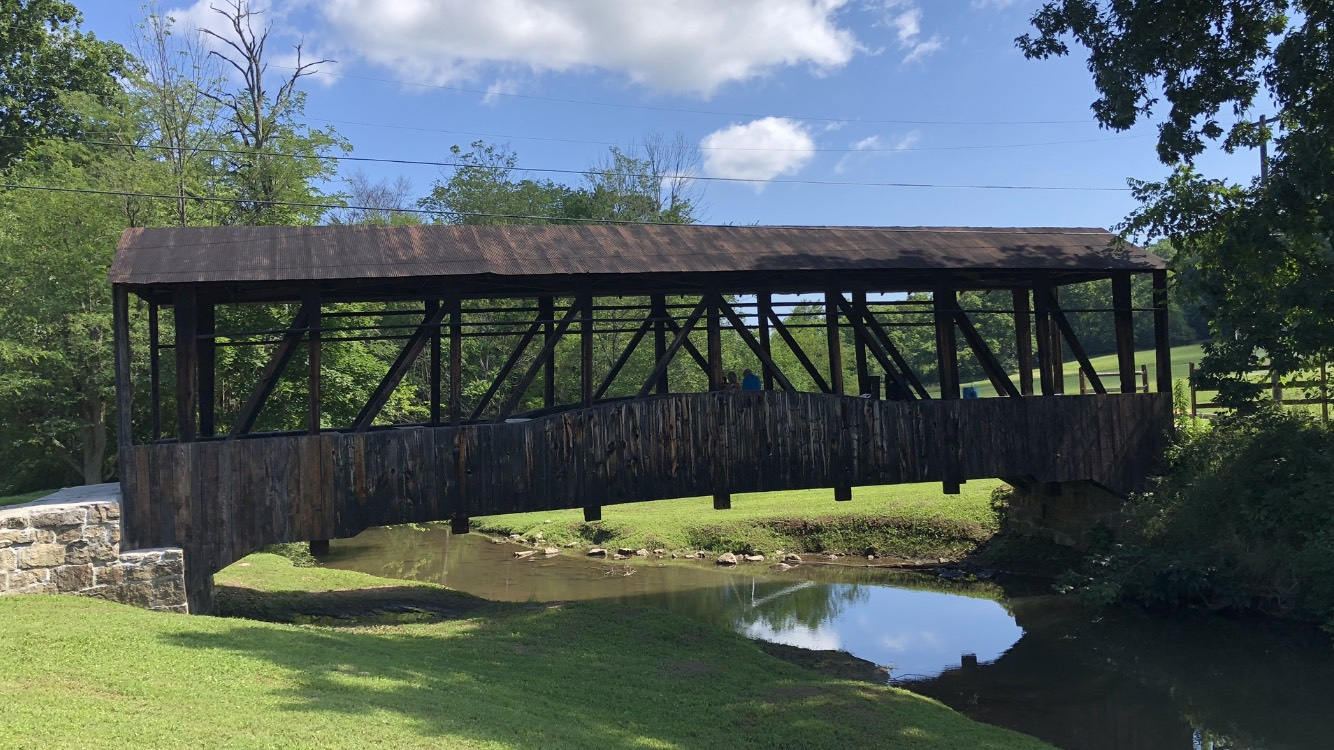

- Location within Pennsylvania Location within the United States
- Location: 1 mile (1.6 km) north of New Paris, Napier Township, Pennsylvania
- Coordinates: 40°6′58″N 78°38′23″W
- Area: less than one acre
- MPS: Bedford County Covered Bridges TR
- NRHP reference No.: 80003423
- Added to NRHP: April 10, 1980

The Cuppett's Covered Bridge, which was built by Cuppett brothers William & Philip on September 14, 1882, is a historic covered bridge that is located in Napier Township, Bedford County, Pennsylvania.

== History and Features ==
Privately owned by the Cuppett family from the day it was built, the bridge took just five months to build for a total cost of $780. John Wayde did the masonry work and Jeremiah Thompson completed the carpentry.

Crossing Dunnings Creek, the 70-foot-long (21 m) bridge is a unique design with unusually low arches and low side walls which highlight the patented Burr Arch Truss system.

The Cuppett's Covered Bridge was listed on the U.S. National Register of Historic Places in 1980 by the United States Department of the Interior.

== Gallery ==
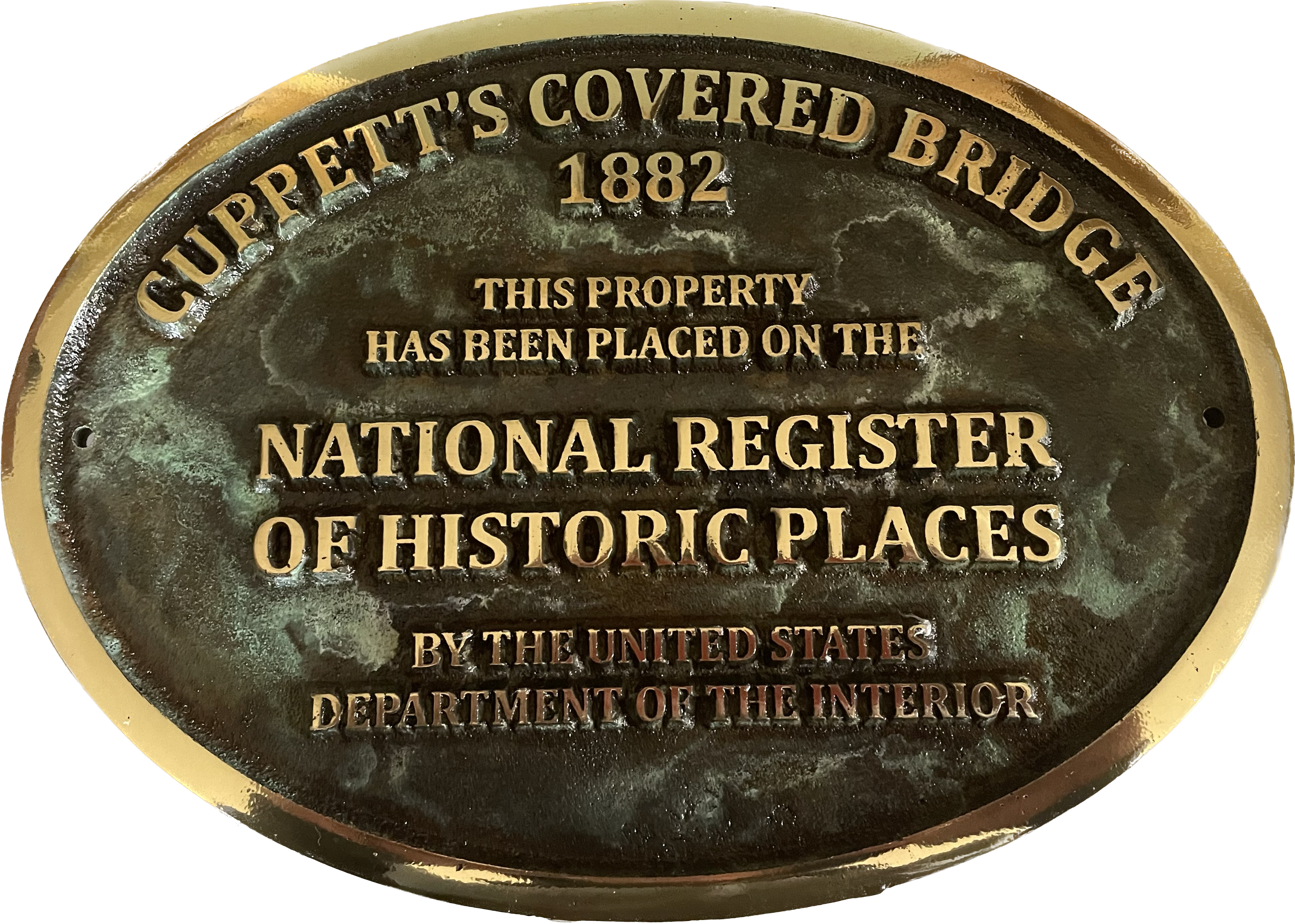
National Register Plaque

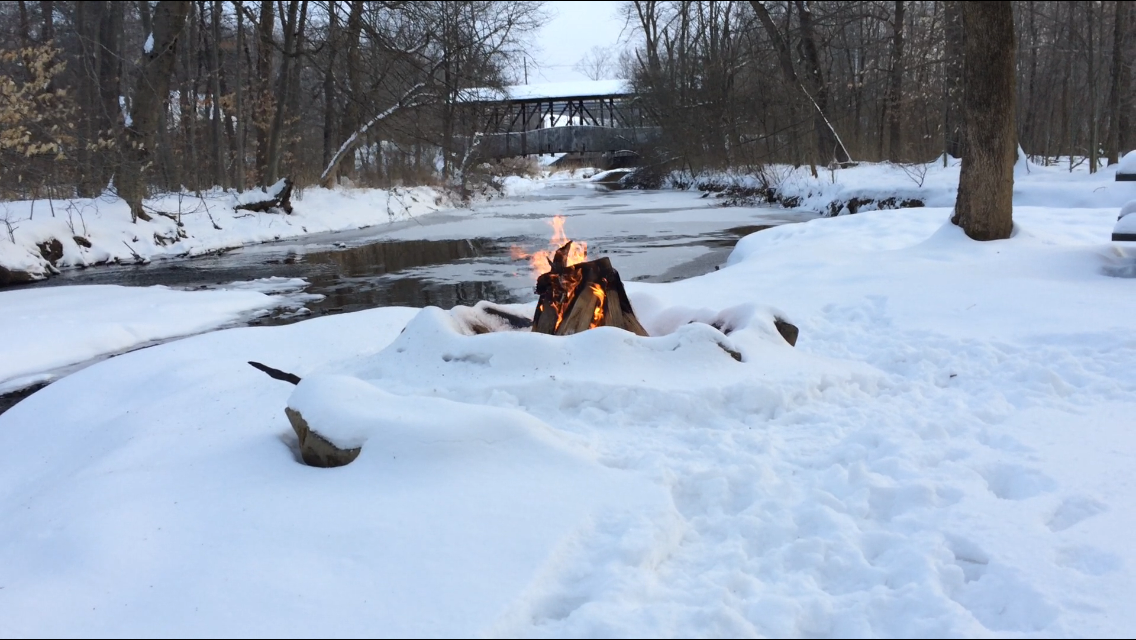
Cuppett's Covered Bridge as Viewed from Cuppett Island

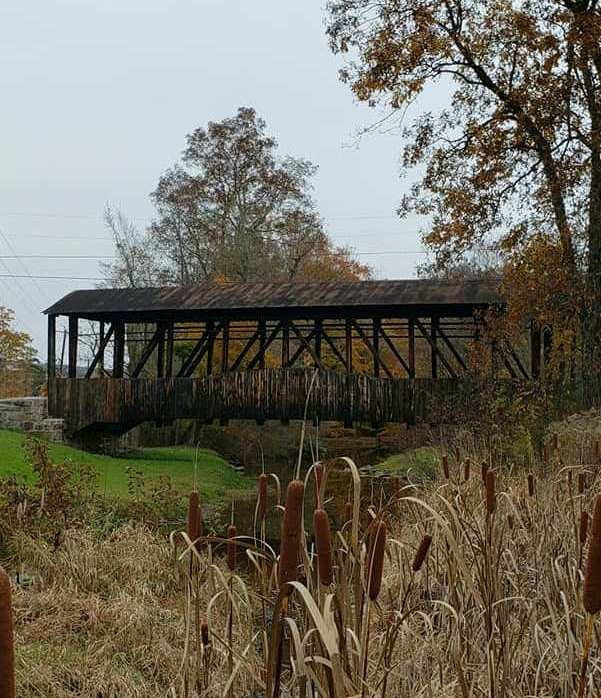
Cuppett's Covered Bridge Over the Cattails

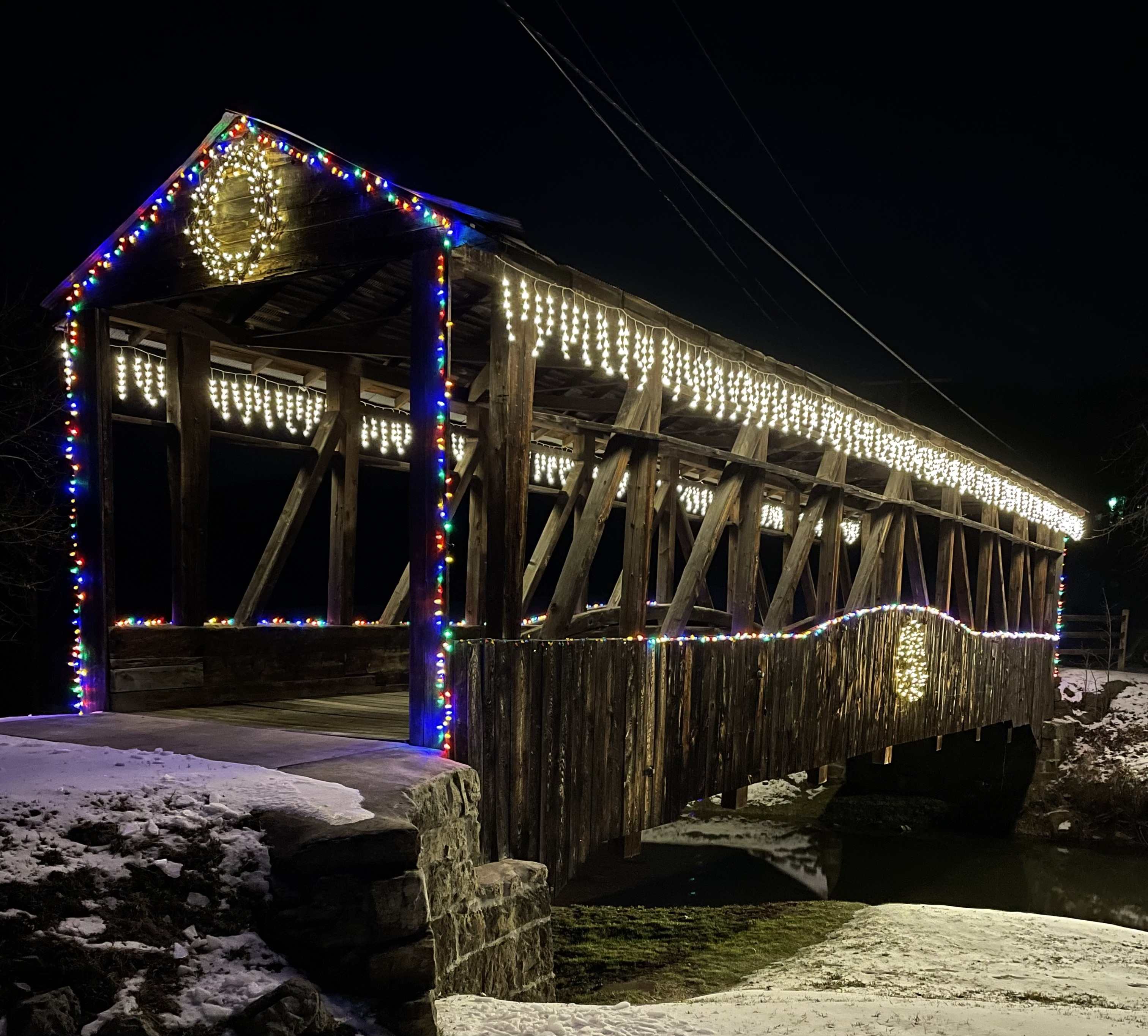
Cuppett's Covered Bridge Decorated for Santa Claus

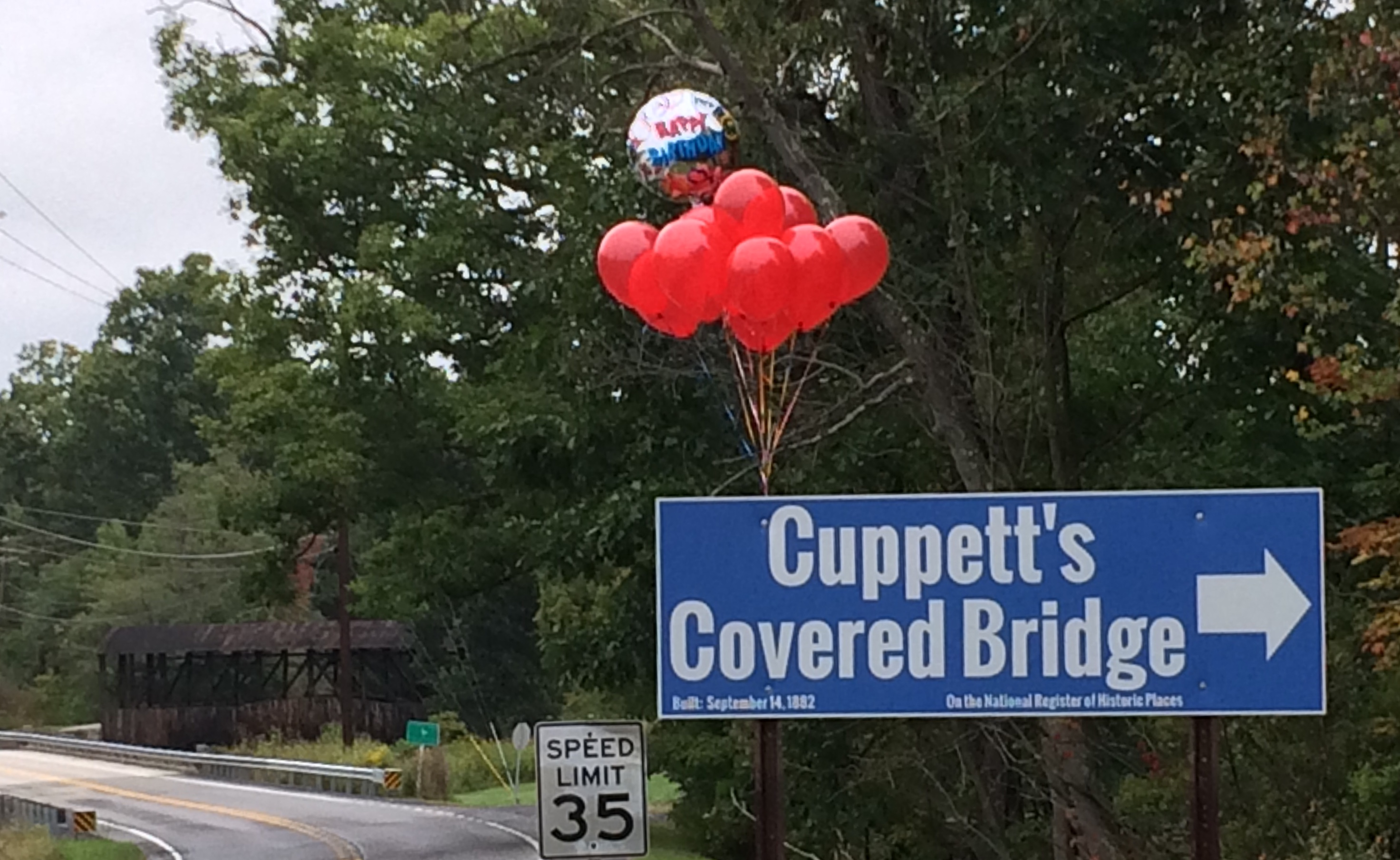
Cuppett's Covered Bridge on its 137th Birthday
