= Germany in the Eurovision Song Contest 2016 =

- Eurovision Song Contest 2016
- Participating broadcaster: ARD (Note: Arbeitsgemeinschaft der öffentlich-rechtlichen Rundfunkanstalten der Bundesrepublik Deutschland) – Norddeutscher Rundfunk (NDR)
- Country: Germany
- Selection process: Unser Lied für Stockholm
- Selection date: 25 February 2016

Competing entry
- Song: "Ghost"
- Artist: Jamie-Lee
- Songwriters: Thomas Burchia; Anna Leyne; Conrad Hensel

Placement
- Final result: 26th, 11 points

Participation chronology

Germany was represented at the Eurovision Song Contest 2016 with the song "Ghost" written by Thomas Burchia, Anna Leyne and Conrad Hensel, and performed by Jamie-Lee. The German entry for the 2016 contest in Stockholm, Sweden was selected through the national final Unser Lied für Stockholm, organised by the German broadcaster ARD in collaboration with Norddeutscher Rundfunk (NDR). The national final took place on 25 February 2016 and featured ten competing acts with the winner being selected through two rounds of public voting. "Ghost" performed by Jamie-Lee Kriewitz was selected as the German entry for Stockholm after placing first in the top three during the first round of voting and ultimately gaining 44.5% of the vote in the second round.

ARD and NDR had initially announced on 19 November 2015 that they had selected the soul and R&B singer-songwriter Xavier Naidoo to represent Germany in Stockholm. A song selection entitled Unser Song für Xavier was planned to be held in February 2016 and would have featured six songs performed by Naidoo with the winning song being selected via public televote. However, following the announcement that Naidoo had been selected to represent Germany, there was public and media backlash in regards to the choice. Naidoo was seen as unfit to represent Germany due to political, homophobic and racial statements the performer had made throughout his career. Two days following the broadcaster's announcement of Naidoo's selection, NDR reneged on their agreement and withdrew the performer as the German representative. ARD and NDR later announced that the German entry would be selected through a national final with the public determining the winner.

As a member of the "Big Five", Germany automatically qualified to compete in the final of the Eurovision Song Contest. Performing in position 10, Germany placed twenty-sixth (last) out of the 26 participating countries with 11 points.

== Background ==
Prior to the 2016 contest, Germany had participated in the Eurovision Song Contest fifty-nine times since its debut as one of seven countries to take part in 1956. Germany has won the contest on two occasions: in 1982 with the song "Ein bißchen Frieden" performed by Nicole and in 2010 with the song "Satellite" performed by Lena. Germany, to this point, has been noted for having competed in the contest more than any other country; they have competed in every contest since the first edition in 1956 except for the 1996 contest when the nation was eliminated in a pre-contest elimination round. In 2015, the German entry "Black Smoke" performed by Ann Sophie placed last out of twenty-seven competing songs and failed to score any points.

The German national broadcaster, ARD, broadcasts the event within Germany and delegates the selection of the nation's entry to the regional broadcaster Norddeutscher Rundfunk (NDR). NDR confirmed that Germany would participate in the 2016 Eurovision Song Contest on 27 May 2015. Since 2013, NDR had set up national finals with several artists to choose both the song and performer to compete at Eurovision for Germany. On 19 November 2015, the broadcaster had initially announced that they had internally selected Xavier Naidoo to represent the country and would organise a national final to select the song he would perform at the contest. After facing media fallout and negative public reactions, NDR reneged on their arrangement with Naidoo and later announced that they would organise a multi-artist national final to select the German entry.

== Before Eurovision ==
=== Selection and withdrawal of Xavier Naidoo ===
On 19 November 2015, the German broadcaster NDR announced that Xavier Naidoo had been selected to represent Germany. A song selection format Unser Song für Xavier (English: Our Song for Xavier) was planned to select the song that Naidoo would have performed at the Eurovision Song Contest. The show was to take place on 18 February 2016 and broadcast live on Das Erste. German composers and lyricists were called upon to submit their entries for the competition. A panel of music experts together with Naidoo would have selected the top six songs by 15 December 2015. During the show, Naidoo would have presented the six songs to the German audience and public televoting would have selected the winner. Three music experts, including the 2010 German Eurovision Song Contest winner Lena, were planned to provide feedback in regards to the songs during the show.

After the announcement, negative reactions were expressed by both the German public and media. Naidoo was viewed as an inappropriate representative for Germany due to his political views in support of the Reichsbürgerbewegung ideology as well as homophobic and racist remarks the performer had made through both statements and his music, and NDR received backlash for having internally selected him. Online petitions were generated in support of and against Naidoo's participation in the contest. The backlash caused NDR to revoke their arrangement with Naidoo two days later on 21 November 2015, which also elicited criticism for the broadcaster's conduct. Naidoo himself issued a statement on his Facebook page where he stated: "A few months ago, ARD approached me and asked me to compete next year for Germany at the Eurovision Song Contest in Stockholm. That was solely a proposal from ARD. I finally agreed after careful consideration, because this competition would have been a very special event for me. If now shortly after our contractual agreement with NDR and the completion of preparations it all has changed by unilateral decision by ARD, then that's ok for me. My passion for music and my commitment to love, freedom, tolerance and coexistence is thereby not stopped." NDR issued a press release with a statement from Thomas Schreiber, ARD's entertainment coordinator and head of the fiction and entertainment department for NDR.

Xavier Naidoo is a brilliant singer who is, according to my own opinion, neither racist nor homophobe. It was clear that his nomination would polarise opinions, but we were surprised about the negative response. The Eurovision Song Contest is a fun event, in which music and the understanding between European people should be the focus. This characteristic must be kept at all costs. The ongoing discussion about Naidoo could harm the image of the Eurovision Song Contest. This is why Naidoo will not represent Germany. We will quickly decide now, how the German entry for the 2016 Eurovision Song Contest will be found

— Thomas Schreiber

In a press conference held on 25 November 2015, ARD chairman and the director of NDR, Lutz Marmor, stated that Naidoo's selection by NDR was a "mistake" and announced that a national final with several artists and the winner being selected by the public would likely be organised to select the German entry. During the press conference, ARD program director, Volker Herres, characterized NDR's nomination of the controversial performer as hasty and that the decision should have been discussed internally with ARD.

=== Unser Lied für Stockholm ===
Unser Lied für Stockholm (English: Our Song for Stockholm) was the competition that selected Germany's entry for the Eurovision Song Contest 2016. The competition took place on 25 February 2016 at the Köln-Mülheim Studios in Cologne, hosted by Barbara Schöneberger. Like in the previous six years, the national final was co-produced by the production company Brainpool, which also co-produced the Eurovision Song Contest 2011 in Düsseldorf and the Eurovision Song Contest 2012 in Baku. Ten acts competed during the show with the winner being selected through a public televote. The show was broadcast on Das Erste and EinsFestival as well as online via the broadcaster's Eurovision Song Contest website eurovision.de and the official Eurovision Song Contest website eurovision.tv. An after-show programme hosted by Bianca Hauda and Thilo Jahn as well as the winner's press conference were also broadcast on EinsFestival as well as online following the competition. The national final was watched by 4.47 million viewers in Germany, making it the most watched Eurovision Song Contest selection show since 2010 when Lena was selected with "Satellite", which won the Eurovision Song Contest 2010 for Germany.

==== Competing entries ====
150 proposals were received by NDR from ARD radio stations, record companies, producers, artist managers and artists themselves. The ten competing entries were selected by a ten-member panel consisting of Tom Bohne (Universal Music Senior Vice President), Carola Conze (NDR representative, head of German delegation for Eurovision), Claudia Gliedt (lead music editor for Brainpool), Nico Gössel (Sony Music head of promotion), Jörg Grabosch (Brainpool managing director), Konrad von Löhneysen (Embassy of Music managing director), Steffen Müller (Warner Music Entertainment managing director for Central Europe), Thomas Schreiber (ARD entertainment coordinator, head of the fiction and entertainment department for NDR), Aditya Sharma (Radio Fritz lead music editor) and Andreas Zagelow (MDR Radio Sputnik music editor). The ten participating acts were announced on 12 January 2016.

Artist	Song	Songwriter(s)
Alex Diehl	"Nur ein Lied"	Alex Diehl
Avantasia	"Mystery of a Blood Red Rose"	Tobias Sammet
Ella Endlich	"Adrenalin"	Erik Macholl, Andreas John, Bahar Henschel
Gregorian	"Masters of Chant"	Frank Peterson, Amelia Brightman, Toni Pintos, Basti Inselmann
Jamie-Lee Kriewitz	"Ghost"	Thomas Burchia, Anna Leyne, Conrad Hensel
Joco	"Full Moon"	Cosima Carl, Josepha Carl, Anya Weihe
Keøma	"Protected"	Chris Klopfer, Kat Frankie
Laura Pinski	"Under the Sun We Are One"	Ralph Siegel, John O'Flynn
Luxuslärm	"Solange Liebe in mir wohnt"	Philippe Heithier, Götz von Sydow
Woods of Birnam	"Lift Me Up (From the Underground)"	Christian Friedel, Philipp Makolies, Duncan Townsend

==== Final ====
The televised final took place on 25 February 2016. Students attending German film and art schools were tasked with developing staging ideas for the participating entries. The winner was selected through two rounds of public voting, including options for landline, SMS and app voting. In the first round of voting, the top three entries were selected to proceed to the second round. In the second round, the winner, "Ghost" performed by Jamie-Lee Kriewitz, was selected. In addition to the performances of the competing entries, 2014 Dutch Eurovision entrants The Common Linnets, who placed second in the Eurovision Song Contest 2014, performed their entry "Calm After the Storm" and together with the German band The BossHoss, they performed a cover version of Dolly Parton's "Jolene". 770,809 votes were cast in the first round, and 1,120,159 votes were cast in the second round.

First Round – 25 February 2016
R/O	Artist	Song	Televote	Place
1	Ella Endlich	"Adrenalin"	41,172	7
2	Joco	"Full Moon"	22,645	9
3	Gregorian	"Masters of Chant"	69,784	5
4	Woods of Birnam	"Lift Me Up (From the Underground)"	12,332	10
5	Luxuslärm	"Solange Liebe in mir wohnt"	42,576	6
6	Keøma	"Protected"	25,609	8
7	Avantasia	"Mystery of a Blood Red Rose"	124,825	2
8	Alex Diehl	"Nur ein Lied"	124,268	3
9	Jamie-Lee Kriewitz	"Ghost"	221,846	1
10	Laura Pinski	"Under the Sun We Are One"	84,642	4

Second Round – 25 February 2016
R/O	Artist	Song	Televote	Place
1	Avantasia	"Mystery of a Blood Red Rose"	241,573	3
2	Alex Diehl	"Nur ein Lied"	380,293	2
3	Jamie-Lee Kriewitz	"Ghost"	498,293	1

== At Eurovision ==
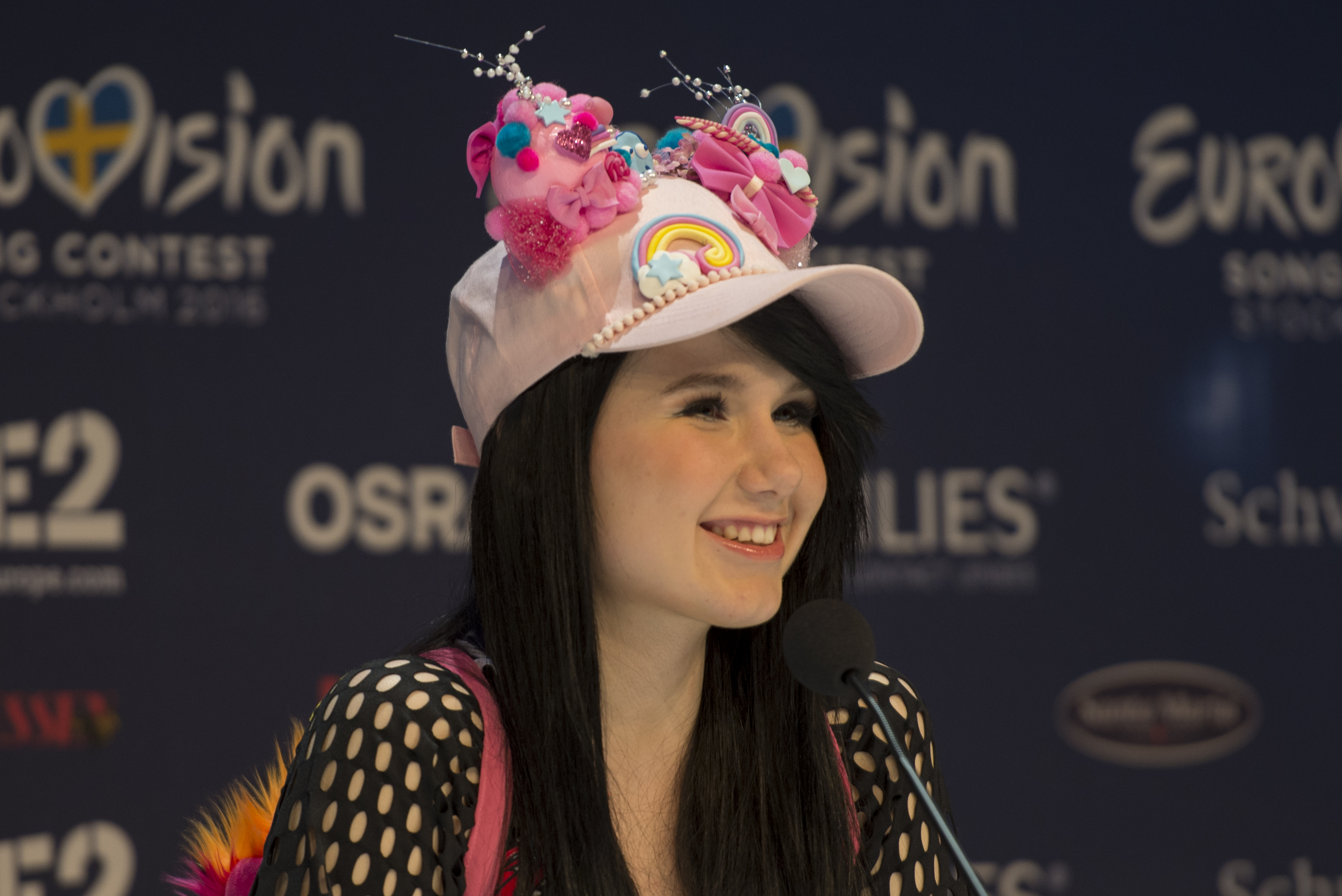
Jamie-Lee during a press meet and greet

According to Eurovision rules, all nations with the exceptions of the host country and the "Big Five" (France, Germany, Italy, Spain and the United Kingdom) are required to qualify from one of two semi-finals in order to compete for the final; the top ten countries from each semi-final progress to the final. As a member of the "Big Five", Germany automatically qualified to compete in the final on 14 May 2016. In addition to their participation in the final, Germany is also required to broadcast and vote in one of the two semi-finals. This would have been regularly decided via a draw held during the semi-final allocation draw on 25 January 2016, however, prior to the draw, ARD requested of the European Broadcasting Union that Germany be allowed to broadcast and vote in the second semi-final on 12 May 2016, which was approved by the contest's Reference Group.

In Germany, the two semi-finals were broadcast on EinsFestival and Phoenix and the final was broadcast on Das Erste. All broadcasts featured commentary by Peter Urban. The final was watched by 9.38 million viewers in Germany, which meant a market share of 36.7 per cent. The German spokesperson, who announced the top 12-point score awarded by the German jury during the final, was Barbara Schöneberger.

=== Final ===
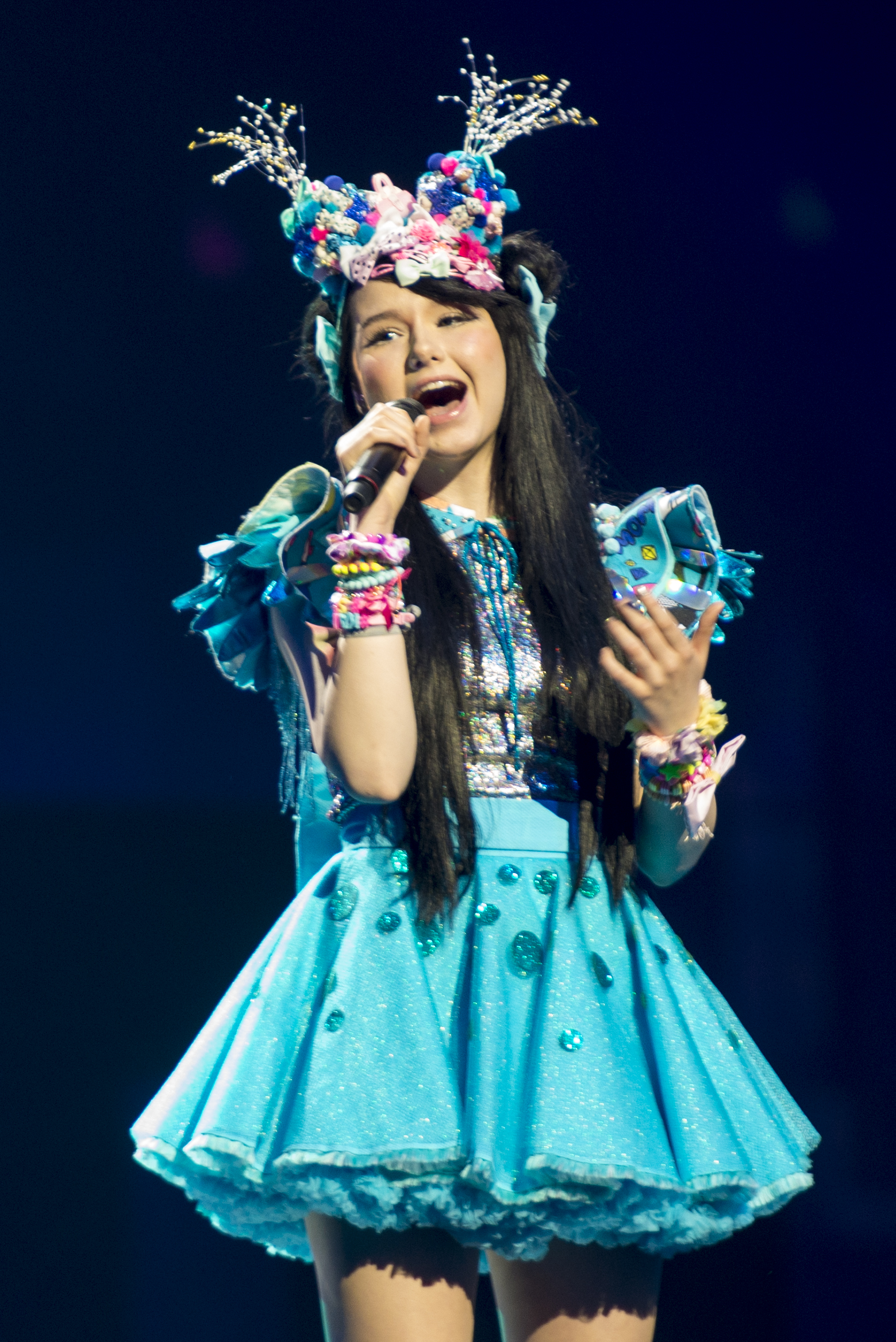
Jamie-Lee during a rehearsal before the final

Jamie-Lee took part in technical rehearsals on 7 and 8 May, followed by dress rehearsals on 11, 13 and 14 May. This included the semi-final jury show on 11 May where an extended clip of the German performance was filmed for broadcast during the live show on 12 May and the jury final on 13 May where the professional juries of each country watched and voted on the competing entries. During the opening ceremony festivities that took place on 8 May, Jamie-Lee took part in a draw to determine in which half of the final the German entry would be performed. Germany was drawn to compete in the first half. Following the conclusion of the second semi-final, the shows' producers decided upon the running order of the final. The running order for the semi-finals and final was decided by the shows' producers rather than through another draw, so that similar songs were not placed next to each other. Germany was subsequently placed to perform in position 10, following the entry from Sweden and before the entry from France.

The German performance featured Jamie-Lee performing on stage in a blue Japanese Decora Kei style outfit with four backing vocalists. The staging presentation included tree props with green lasers, transparent projection screens that displayed more trees and a smoke effect that covered the stage floor. The stage colours were blue, purple and green with the LED screens displaying a rising full moon. The four backing vocalists that joined Jamie-Lee on stage were Anne Leyne, Tina Frank, Ray Lozano and Helen Kaiser. Germany placed twenty-sixth (last) in the final, scoring 11 points: 10 points from the televoting and 1 point from the juries. Germany became the first country since Malta in 1971 and 1972 to finish last in the final in two consecutive years.

=== Voting ===
Voting during the three shows was conducted under a new system that involved each country now awarding two sets of points from 1–8, 10 and 12: one from their professional jury and the other from televoting. Each nation's jury consisted of five music industry professionals who are citizens of the country they represent, with their names published before the contest to ensure transparency. This jury judged each entry based on: vocal capacity; the stage performance; the song's composition and originality; and the overall impression by the act. In addition, no member of a national jury was permitted to be related in any way to any of the competing acts in such a way that they cannot vote impartially and independently. The individual rankings of each jury member as well as the nation's televoting results were released shortly after the grand final.

Below is a breakdown of points awarded to Germany and awarded by Germany in the second semi-final and grand final of the contest, and the breakdown of the jury voting and televoting conducted during the two shows:

==== Points awarded to Germany ====
Points awarded to Germany (Final)
Score	Televote	Jury
12 points		
10 points		
8 points	Switzerland	
7 points		
6 points		
5 points		
4 points		
3 points		
2 points	Austria	
1 point		Georgia

==== Points awarded by Germany ====
Points awarded by Germany (Semi-final 2)
Score	Televote	Jury
12 points	Poland	Israel
10 points	Australia	Georgia
8 points	Ukraine	Belgium
7 points	Bulgaria	Australia
6 points	Belgium	Ukraine
5 points	Georgia	Latvia
4 points	Lithuania	Bulgaria
3 points	Latvia	Lithuania
2 points	Israel	Belarus
1 point	Serbia	Switzerland

Points awarded by Germany (Final)
Score	Televote	Jury
12 points	Russia	Israel
10 points	Poland	Sweden
8 points	Sweden	Georgia
7 points	Austria	Ukraine
6 points	Ukraine	Australia
5 points	Australia	Belgium
4 points	Bulgaria	Netherlands
3 points	Netherlands	Italy
2 points	Armenia	Latvia
1 point	Italy	Lithuania

==== Detailed voting results ====
The following members comprised the German jury:

- Hanan Hamdi (Namika; jury chairperson) – singer
- Sascha Vollmer (Hoss Power) – singer, composer, musician
- Alec Völkel (Boss Burns) – singer
- Sarah Connor – singer
- Anna Loos – singer, actress

Detailed voting results from Germany (Semi-final 2)
R/O	Country	Jury							Televote	
R/O	Country	Namika	S. Connor	A. Loos	Boss Burns	Hoss Power	Rank	Points	Rank	Points
01	Latvia	8	12	7	6	6	6	5	8	3
02	Poland	10	11	9	15	12	12		1	12
03	Switzerland	14	8	11	10	10	10	1	18	
04	Israel	2	3	1	3	1	1	12	9	2
05	Belarus	9	14	12	8	7	9	2	16	
06	Serbia	13	15	16	16	15	17		10	1
07	Ireland	16	13	13	14	16	16		11	
08	Macedonia	7	16	17	12	17	15		12	
09	Lithuania	11	7	5	17	8	8	3	7	4
10	Australia	4	2	2	5	5	4	7	2	10
11	Slovenia	17	10	10	9	13	13		17	
12	Bulgaria	5	6	14	7	9	7	4	4	7
13	Denmark	18	17	18	18	18	18		14	
14	Ukraine	3	9	3	4	3	5	6	3	8
15	Norway	15	4	8	13	14	11		13	
16	Georgia	6	1	4	1	2	2	10	6	5
17	Albania	12	18	15	11	11	14		15	
18	Belgium	1	5	6	2	4	3	8	5	6

Detailed voting results from Germany (Final)
R/O	Country	Jury							Televote	
R/O	Country	Namika	S. Connor	A. Loos	Boss Burns	Hoss Power	Rank	Points	Rank	Points
01	Belgium	2	10	7	7	6	6	5	17	
02	Czech Republic	22	21	21	22	22	22		24	
03	Netherlands	11	6	13	4	4	7	4	8	3
04	Azerbaijan	25	22	22	21	25	24		23	
05	Hungary	12	13	18	20	17	17		19	
06	Italy	13	7	11	8	11	8	3	10	1
07	Israel	3	1	1	1	1	1	12	18	
08	Bulgaria	14	11	17	13	19	14		7	4
09	Sweden	1	4	2	3	2	2	10	3	8
10	Germany									
11	France	8	19	24	18	18	20		13	
12	Poland	18	14	16	19	20	19		2	10
13	Australia	6	3	5	6	8	5	6	6	5
14	Cyprus	20	25	25	24	24	25		11	
15	Serbia	16	18	23	25	23	21		21	
16	Lithuania	15	9	6	15	12	10	1	15	
17	Croatia	5	12	15	11	16	12		22	
18	Russia	23	17	10	16	15	18		1	12
19	Spain	10	16	9	10	14	11		12	
20	Latvia	21	8	8	9	7	9	2	16	
21	Ukraine	4	5	4	5	5	4	7	5	6
22	Malta	24	24	20	23	21	23		25	
23	Georgia	7	2	3	2	3	3	8	14	
24	Austria	19	20	14	14	10	16		4	7
25	United Kingdom	17	15	12	17	13	15		20	
26	Armenia	9	23	19	12	9	13		9	2
