= Alex Diehl =

German singer and songwriter

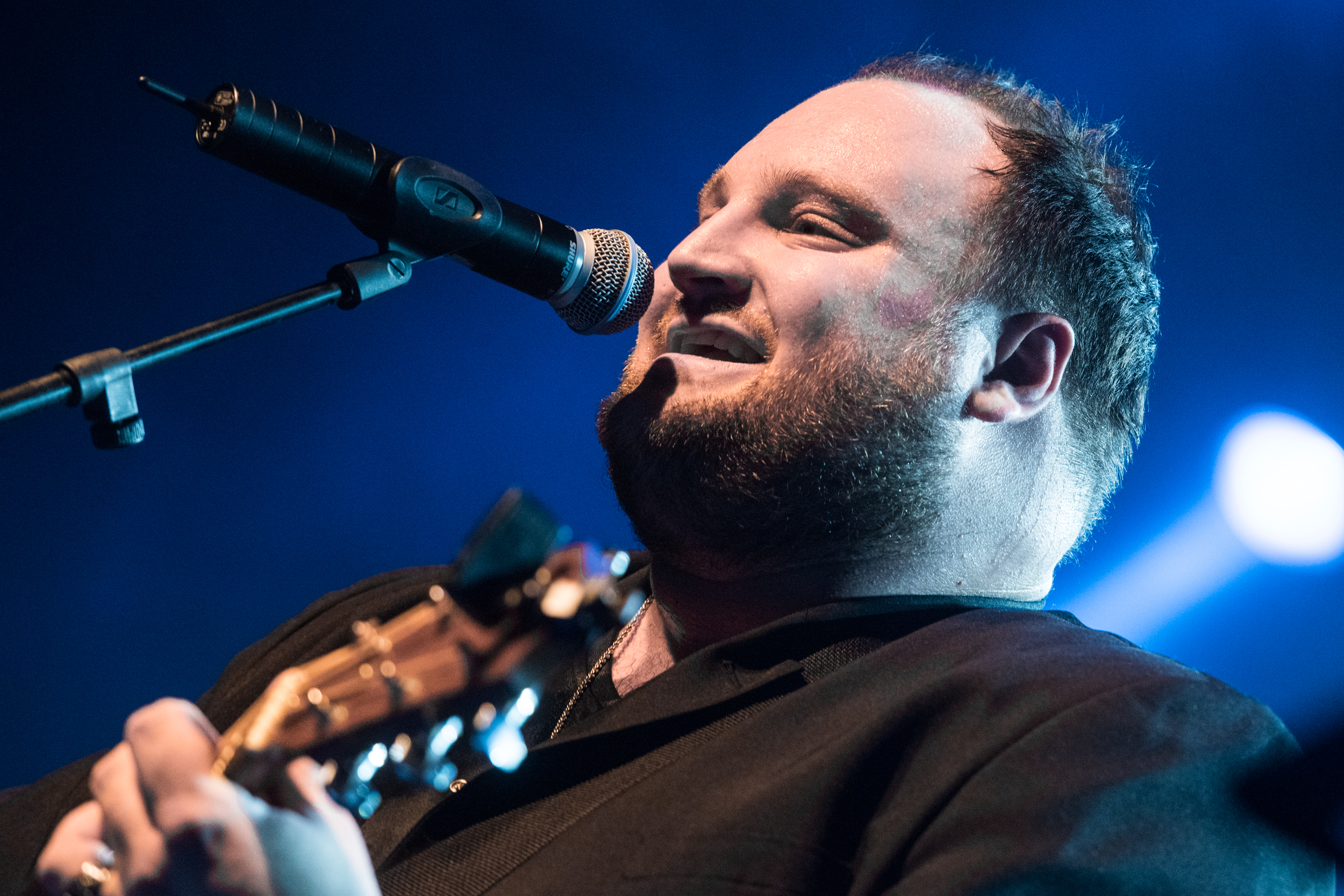
- Born: November 26, 1987 (age 38); Traunstein
- Occupations: Singer, Songwriter

Alex Diehl (born 26 November 1987 in Traunstein) is a German singer and songwriter. He was selected as one of ten artists to compete in the German qualifiers for the Eurovision Song Contest 2016. German televoters selected his entry Nur ein Lied ("Just a Song") into the final of three, where he finished second only to Jamie-Lee Kriewitz' winning title Ghost.
