= Hanns Diehl =

Austrian artist (1877–1946)

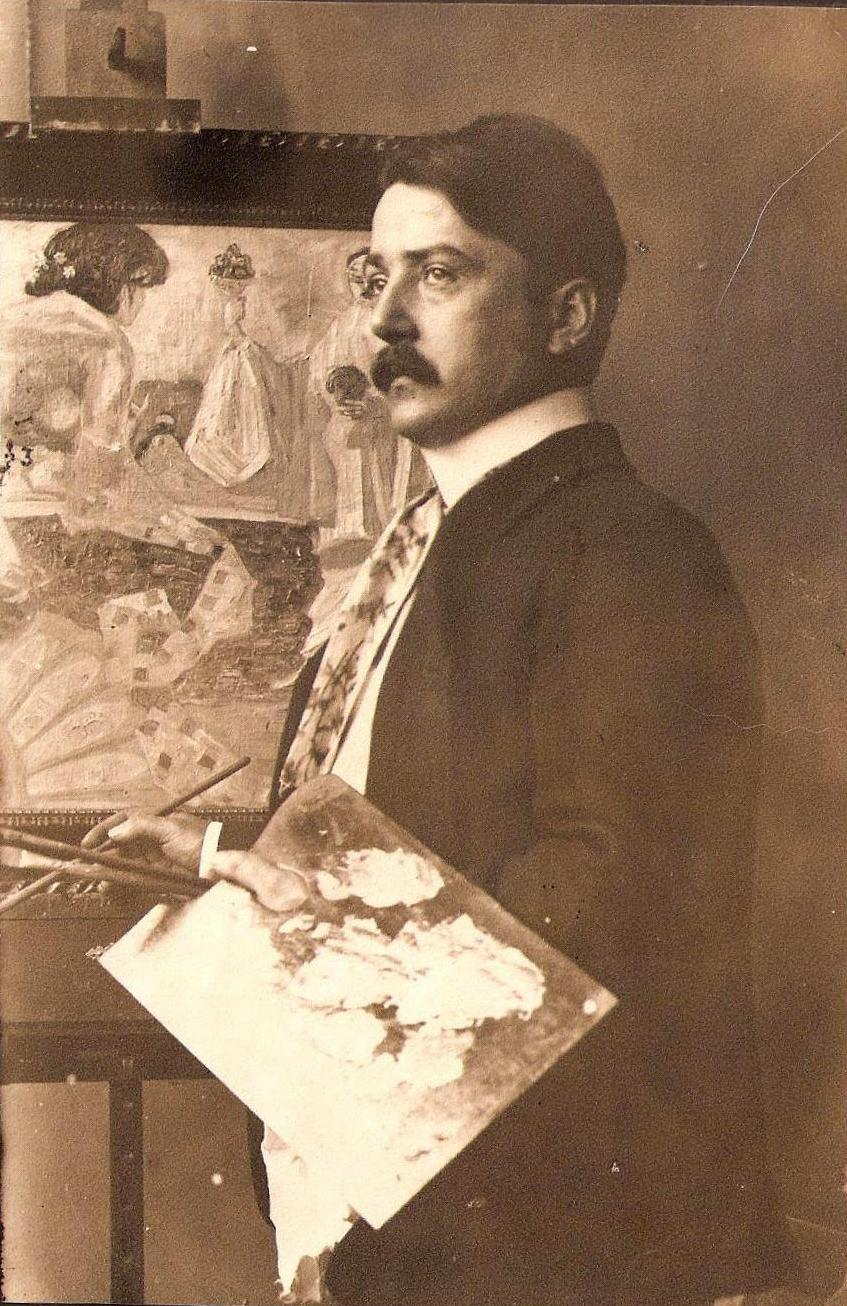
- Hanns Diehl at his easel, ca. 1910
- Born: Hans Diehl; 13 March 1877; Pirmasens, Germany
- Died: 22 December 1946 (aged 69); Vienna, Austria
- Other name: Hanns Diehl-Wallendorf
- Years active: 1897-1946

Hanns Diehl (13 March 1877 – 22 December 1946) was an Austrian artist influential as the founder of Vienna's Künstlerbund Segantini (1921–1938).

== Early life ==
Hanns Diehl was born Hans Rudolf Diehl in Pirmasens, Rhineland-Palatinate, Germany, as the second son of August Diehl and Julia (née Herb), a mechanical engineer and factory owner. He spent his earliest childhood years in Pirmasens until his father’s business sent the family to Moscow. Here Hanns studied Russian and attended his first four years of school at the Petri-Pauli Realgymnasium; he wrote later that his happiest memories as a boy were connected with his Russian life, where he often wandered through the magnificent forests surrounding the city and drew nature studies under the guidance of his mother. He described his mother as "...a not untalented dilettante who possessed a sharp eye and a striking judgment about graphic form". (Note: “...eine nicht unbegabte Diletantin…die namentlich für das rein Zeichnerische einen scharfen Blick und ein treffendes Urteil besass.”)

== Education ==
The family moved back to Germany in the 1890s, to Weimar, where Diehl finished his secondary school education and entered the renowned Weimar Akademie für bildende Künste—the Academy of Fine Arts. He received his diploma from the Akademie in 1896, having studied under the Norwegian genre painter Carl Frithjof Smith (1859–1917) and Max Thedy (1858–1924), then as a master’s student with Professor Theodor Hagen, considered one of the founders of German Impressionism. In 1898, he went to study drawing at the Städelsches Kunstinstitut in Frankfurt with Bernhard Mannfeld (1848–1925), who remained a lifelong friend and confidant. During these years of study, he traveled to Paris, Switzerland, the Baltic coast, and Hungary. During his years in Frankfurt, he established a lifelong friendship with the German naturalist painter Wilhelm Trübner; the older artist helped Diehl to establish himself as an academic painter. Through Trübner, he gained access to the Kunstsalon Bangel, where he participated in his first group exhibition in 1900. Of his works in this show, one critic praised his "quiet landscapes" as imparting a sense of rumination on life and stillness. (Note: "Er malt ein 'stilles Land', das fast ein Phantasiebild anmutet, in welches der Maler eigene Gedanken über Friede und Todesruhe und eigene Töne zu legen weiss...", "Kleines Feuilleton," Frankfurter General-Anzeiger 11 October 1900.) At this time he began referring to himself as Hanns Diehl-Wallendorf, apparently as a way to distinguish himself from another artist named Hans Diehl.

== Military service ==
In 1905, Diehl volunteered for his obligatory military service by joining a Hessian Infantry Regiment, spending one year in Darmstadt. In the first three years of World War I he served as a translator from Russian for the war ministry in Munich, for which he was awarded the König-Ludwigs-Kreuz. At the beginning of 1918, he applied to become a war painter on the front and was assigned to the Bavarian Infantry in the field. There he painted troops as well as the commander Franz Ritter von Epp (1868–1946). He was greatly traumatized by what he experienced on the front; he wrote “The unheard of terror of this war I saw and experienced in France and Serbia; an enduring impression of unlimited and completely inhumane barbarity". (Note: "Die unerhörten Schrecken dieses Völkerkrieges habe ich in Frankreich und Serbien gesehen und erlebt; Ein bleibender Eindruck von unermesslicher und ganz unmenschlicher Barbarei.” Transcript of speech given in Vienna, April 1931.)

== Career in Vienna ==
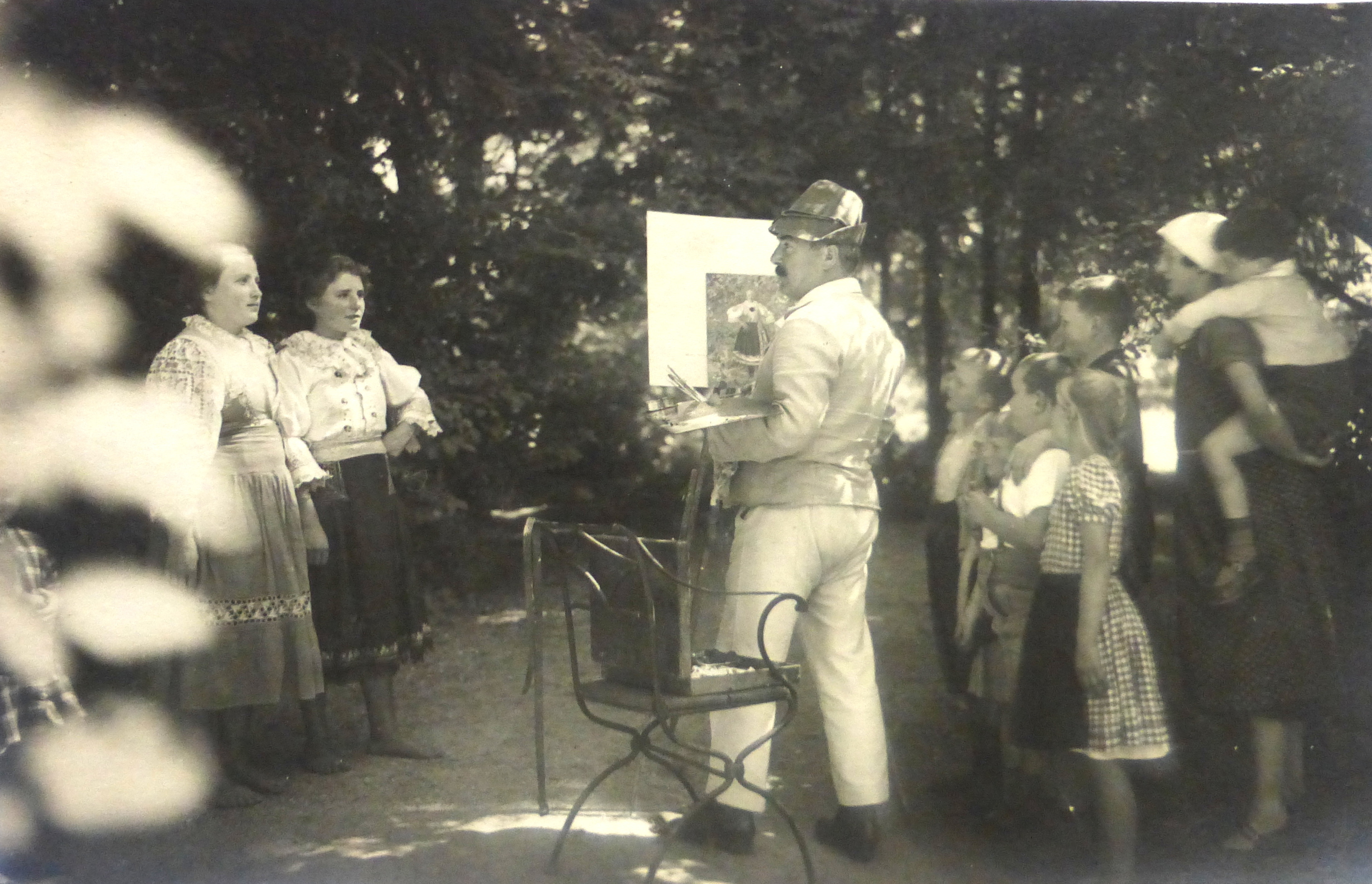
Diehl at his easel outdoors, 1920s

In 1906, Diehl moved to Vienna, at the invitation of his mother's brother August Herb, who ran a decorative glass-making company, Herb & Schwab. He designed the company's logo, and provided many designs for Art Nouveau-style glass windows that were then the fashion for private homes and hotels. He was meant to take over the business, but had no interest in running a company, nor did he possess any business acumen; he wanted only to be a professional artist. In need of work, he experimented in a variety of styles, imitating the methods of Arnold Böcklin and Max Klinger. He painted ambitious oils and watercolor landscapes, but also produced prints for magazines and tried his hand at every medium. He also designed the cover for an avant-garde magazine founded by his brother Gustav Eugen Diehl, Moderne Revue. He was still experimenting artistically and had yet to find his own artistic voice.

In 1916, he married Anna Pangratz (1887–1946), a capable businesswoman. She gave up her position at the Handelskammer (Chamber of Commerce) when she thought she was marrying a man who would be a director of a business. When Diehl rejected this position, Anna went back to work as the supervisor of the correspondence department of the Anker-Brot bakery firm, a position she held for 25 years. Hanns was now free to pursue his career solely as an artist. Hanns and Anna had one daughter, Ingeborg, born in 1917.

Ambitious and energetic, Diehl was intent on emulating such figures as Trübner—his ideal of an academic artist. He painted all genres, from mythological narrative images to landscapes and still-lifes, both in oil and in watercolor. He sketched constantly and seemed most confident in creating colored landscape drawings, which demonstrate excellent perspectival rendering and shading.

After the war, he brought together a group of like-minded artists in Vienna and established the “Künstlerbund Segantini” in 1921. He served as its director for the remainder of its lifespan until the onset of World War II. This artist's organization was committed to a traditional idea of painting, emulating the Austrian-Swiss painter of symbolic Alpine landscapes, Giovanni Segantini (1858–1899). This romantic Germanic style appealed to Diehl's emotional instincts, but his work never copied Segantini's motifs. Critics speak of his work as showing an individual streak within traditional painterly parameters—of going his "own way" —and by the 1920s, Diehl was indeed formulating his own stylistic preferences. His portraits and still-lifes of the decade reveal a firm linear outline, with a near-impasto use of thick color. One critic of the first Segantini-Bund exhibition described his works admiringly as depicting "architectonic fantasies". Throughout he made masterful drawings and amusing sketches wherever he traveled, and began to produce full-fledged watercolor landscapes.

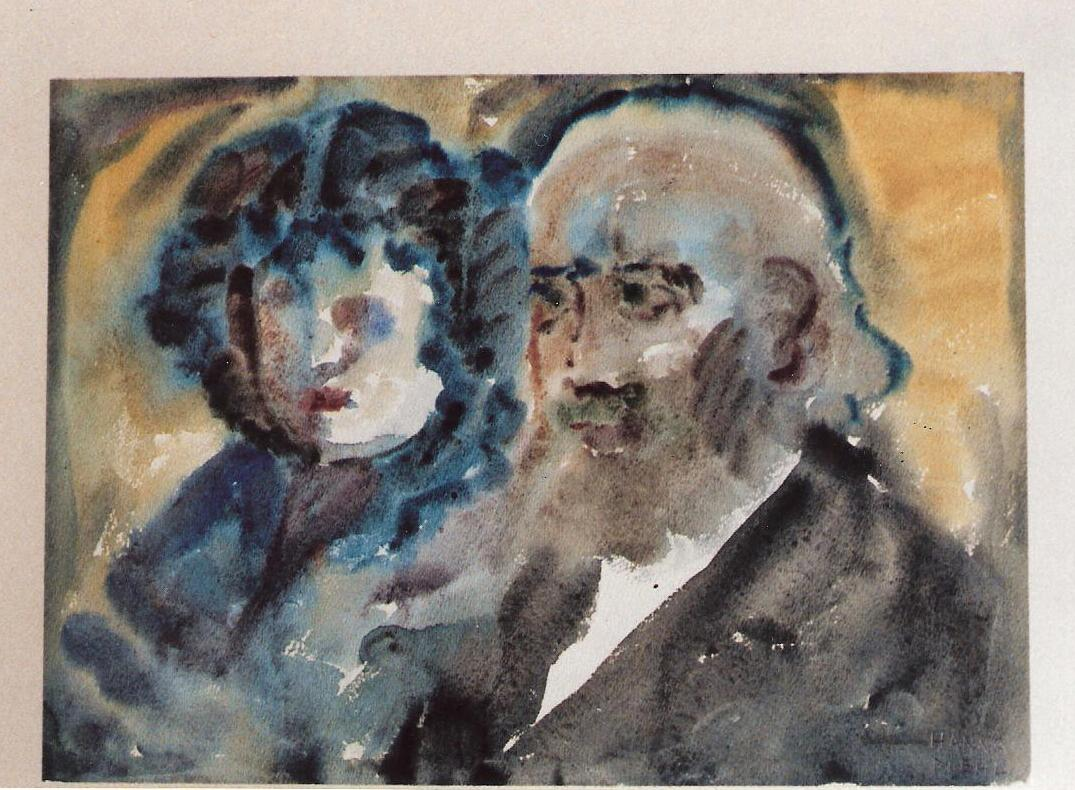
Watercolor of "Two Heads", ca. 1928.

Ever short of patrons and often without enough money to buy materials, he did take on students, and at times offered drawing classes.

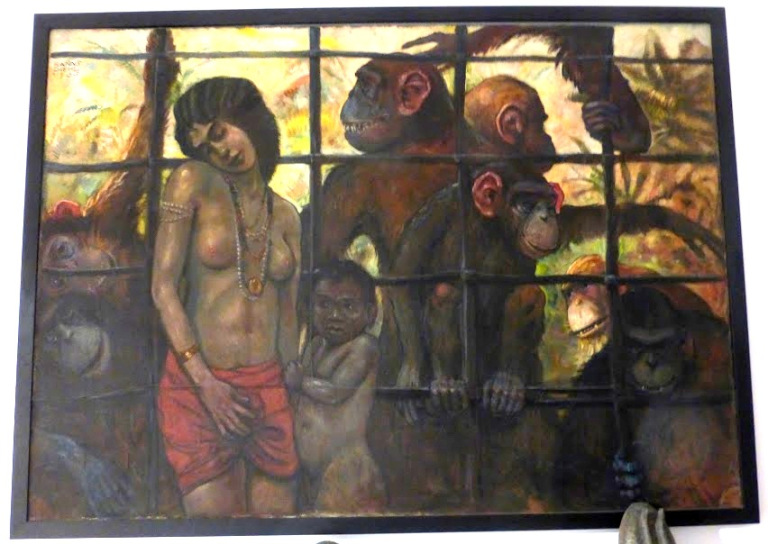
Ballad of the Apes

In one of his most cryptic and intriguing works, Affenballade (Ballad of the Apes), he created a grid of bars that are painted along the lines of the Hessian sacks he used as a canvas. In the late 1920s, he began to create, apparently for private amusement, a series of eccentric, caricature-like watercolors that reveal a knowledge of works by such modern figures as Emil Nolde and Alfred Kubin. These often satirical commentaries are unlike any of his other, more formal works, and are described by later critics as revealing both a scurrilous sentiment and a debt to German Expressionism. These sometimes anguished images are the pieces that have endured and are of greatest interest to contemporary audiences, who see in them a psychological reflection of the time between the wars in Vienna.

== Later life ==
In her description of Diehl's life and career, Erika Esau writes, "Diehl's story epitomizes the confusing, and ultimately sad, trajectory that the political events of 20th-century history imposed on anyone involved in the artistic life of the German-speaking world." Hanns Diehl was, like so many of his contemporaries, a romantic nationalist—a German who had become a naturalized Austrian citizen in 1926, at a time when notions of national identity were particularly urgent, after the defeat in World War I and the fear of Soviet-style Communism engulfing the countries. Artists as diverse as Nolde and Lyonel Feininger initially praised Hitler and Mussolini's efforts. Diehl became a member of the National Socialist Party even before the Anschluss in 1938—a decision that would come to haunt him after World War II. When the Nazis did take over Austria, Diehl naively saw the regime as offering job opportunities. He became one of the directors of the Gemeinschaft bildender Künstler, the Society of Visual Artists, and submitted designs for the Party's official publications and events. He was to be bitterly disappointed that the regime was to exclude so many artists from its official exhibitions, writing a letter of complaint to the Party officials expressing his dismay at this lack of " National Socialist collegiality." This complete lack of understanding of the Nazi Party's political goals is indicative of so many cultural figures of the time. Diehl never expressed any anti-Semitic sentiment, and after the War, when he was briefly imprisoned, it was the testimony of a Jewish neighbor that assured his release.

The real reasons for his arrest in 1946 have been muddied, but appear to have more to do with a squabble over studio space that caused Diehl to be turned in to the authorities as a Nazi party member. Because of the chaos of the judicial system immediately after the war, he remained in remand "under investigation" for 8 months. He was never brought to trial, convicted of any offense, or even formally charged with any offense. The situation broke him nonetheless. Although divorced by Anna by this time, he still went to live in her house. On 22 December 1946 both she and Hanns died of asphyxiation from a faulty gas heater. It is still unclear if their deaths were an accident or suicide.

Perhaps because of his close ties to the Nazi Party, Diehl was forgotten, even as other members of the Segantini-Bund gained some recognition. In 1963, his family organized an exhibition of his work at the Österreichische Staatsdruckerei, at which time the art critic of the Wiener Zeitung wrote that he was a painter who had been unfairly forgotten. Another exhibition at the Kunsthandel Hieke in 1993 praised his watercolors and personal paintings of the 1920s as his best work, labeling him as an artist "between tradition and eccentricity."

== Gallery ==
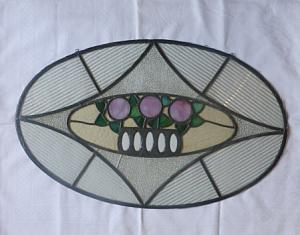
Stained glass

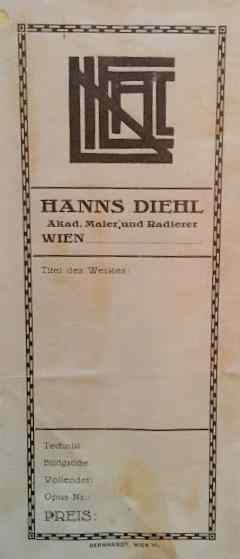
Diehl's logo and receipt

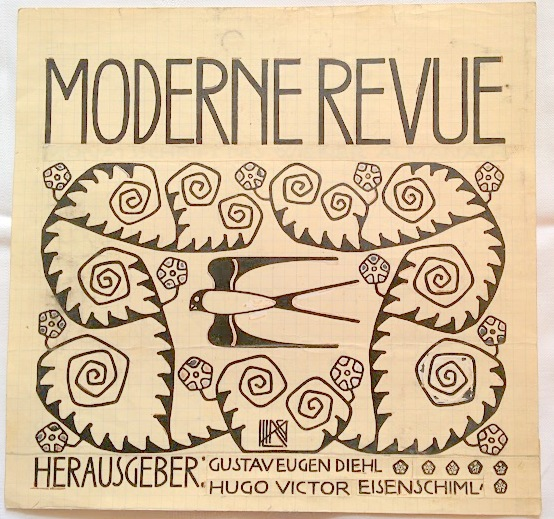
Cover design, ca. 1907

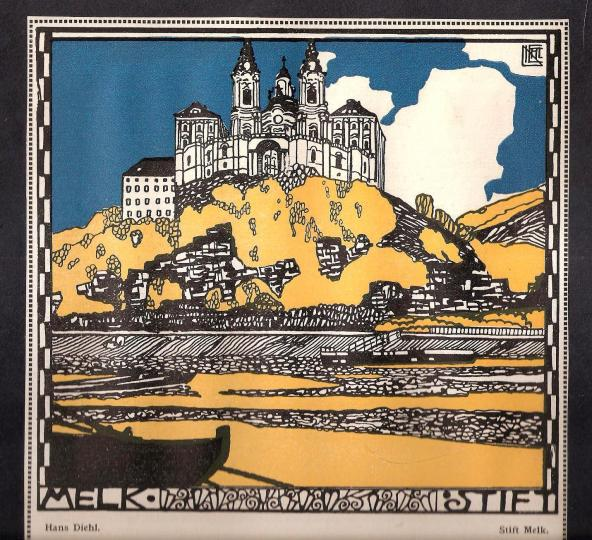
Print, Melk, ca. 1097

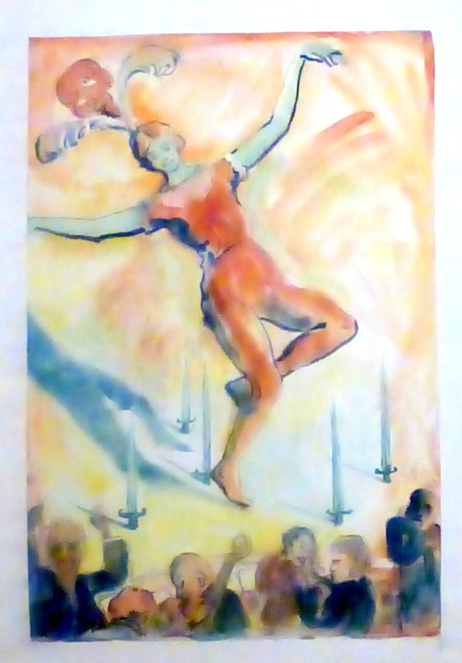
Watercolor, Sword Dancer, 1920s

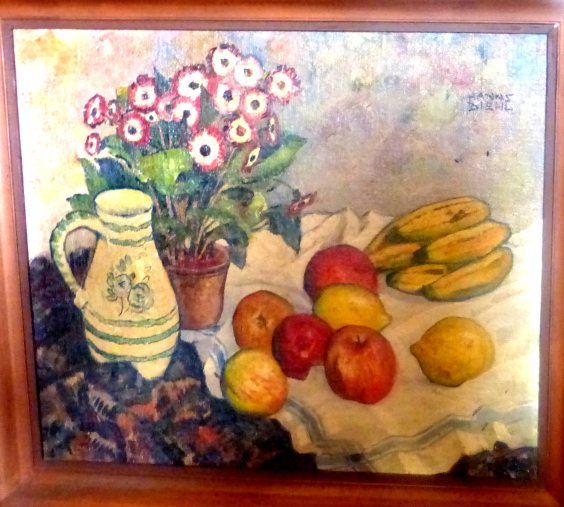
Still life of flowers, 1923

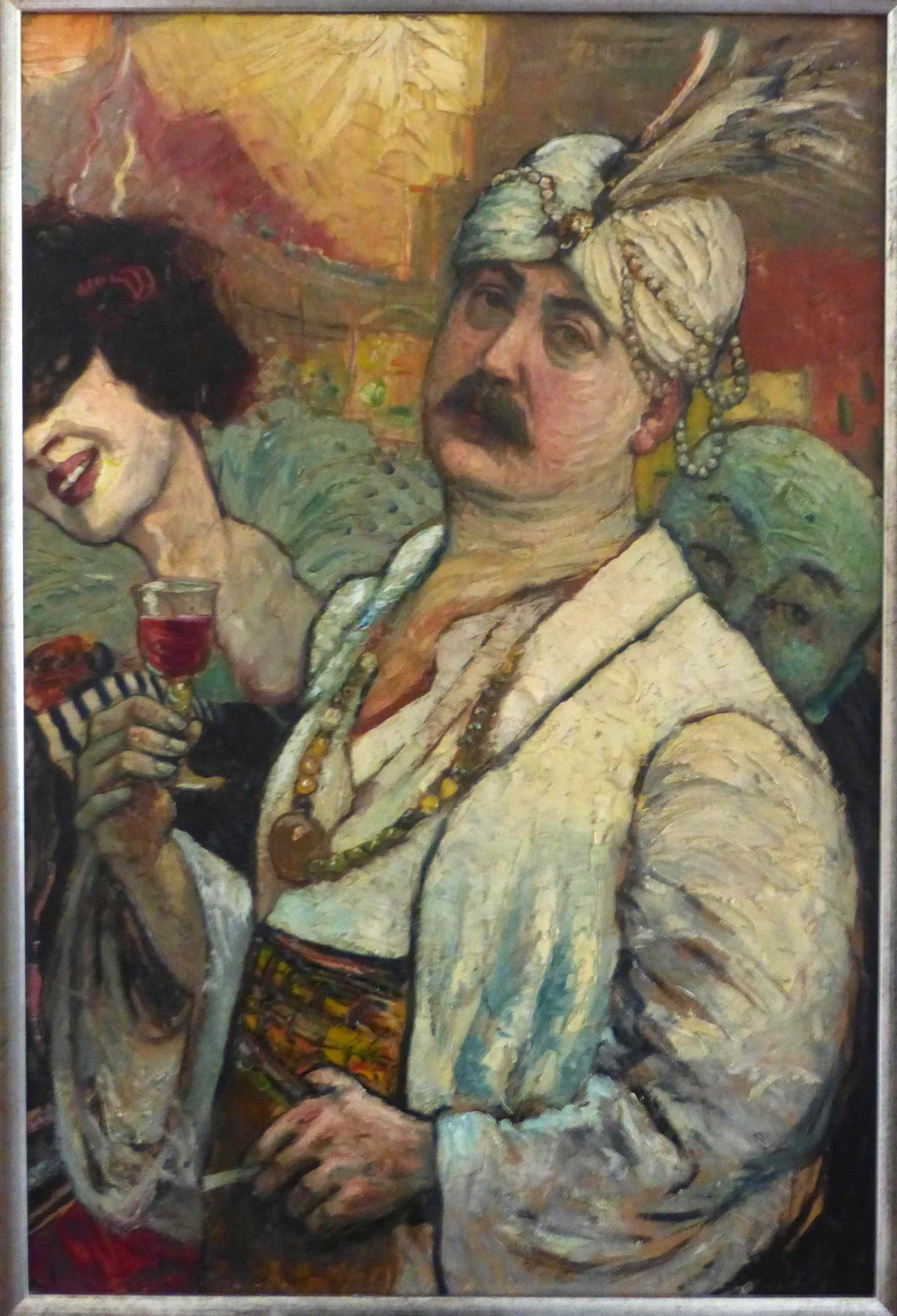
"Self Portrait in a Turban", oil painting, ca. 1925
