= Joco (duo) =

German music duo

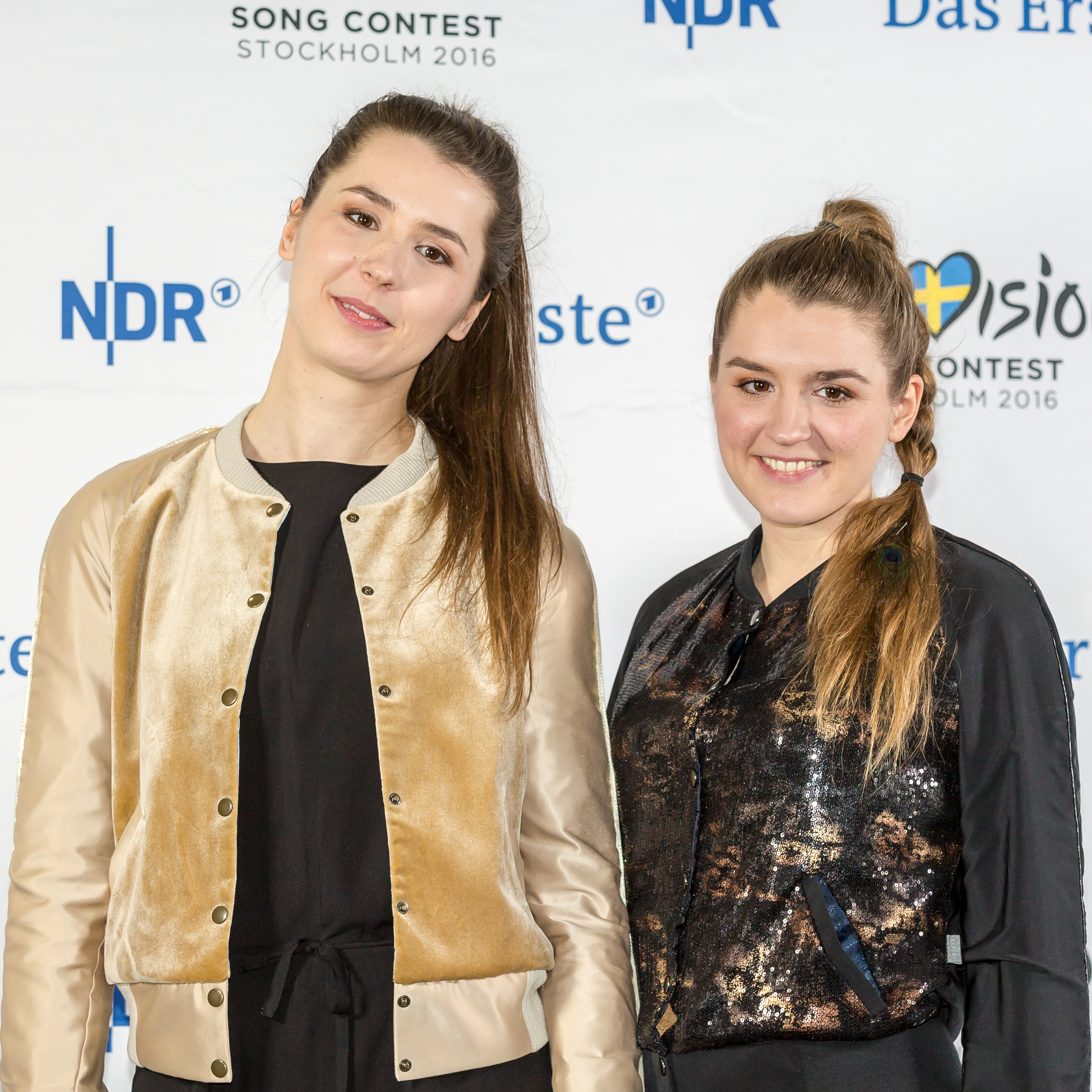
- Joco on German Television, 2016

Background information
- Origin: Hamburg, Germany
- Years active: 2015–present
- Labels: Sony
- Awards: Association of German Concert Agencies (VDKD), "Best Newcomer of the Year", 2015
- Members: Josepha Carl; Cosima Carl
- Website: jocomusic.com

Joco (commonly stylized as JOCO) is a German music duo consisting of sisters Josepha Carl and Cosima Carl from Hamburg, Germany.

The two sisters are known for their unique compositions, with Josepha playing the drums and Cosima playing the piano.

== History ==
Having starting to play the piano at an early age, Cosima studied the piano at the ArtEZ Conservatory in Enschede, Netherlands, where as Josepha studied both singing and the saxophone. They both are multi-instrumentalists and play all the instruments in used in their music by themselves, except for some additional instruments such the as bass guitar (which they invited guest musicians for on their second album).

After the release of their albums "Horizon" (2015) and "Into the Deep" (2017), the duo toured Europe in 2021; performing at concerts and festivals, as well as doing interviews on TV shows and radio.

Both of their albums were recorded at the Abbey Road Studios recording studio in London together with Grammy Award winning producer Steve Orchard.

In November 2015, the sisters won the VDKD music award and were honored as "Best Newcomer of the Year 2015". They were also nominated for the German New Music Award. Sony Music Germany signed JOCO, releasing "Horizon" and "Into the Deep" physically in Germany, Austria and Switzerland as well as digitally worldwide.

Official music videos were produced for their singles "Pilot" and "Why Didn’t I See" (2015) and for the second album’s single "Racquet" and "Kopfkarussell". Moreover, many live video sessions were recorded on online session platforms. There also exists a short online documentary about their first recording session at Abbey Road.

In 2016, the duo was selected as one of ten artists to compete in the German qualifiers for the Eurovision Song Contest 2016, although they were later eliminated in the final three.

JOCO has also collaborated with projects from the jazz and classical world. The German National Broadcasting Service (NDR) invited the two to work together with the NDR Bigband. In 2018, JOCO played the sold out Elbphilharmonie two nights in a row and shared the stage with the NDR Elbphilharmonie Orchestra under the theme 'classic meets pop'.

The sisters have connected with international musicians, having gone on tour with Van Morrison and Lucy Rose. In July 2018, JOCO was invited to China to play at the "Chengdu International Sister Cities Youth Music Festival" and in 2019 they played at the South by Southwest (SXSW) Festival in Austin, Texas (USA).

== Media appearances ==
In 2016, JOCO took part in the German pre-selection for the Eurovision Song Contest and played their Song "Full Moon" live on television for an audience of around 4.2 million. The performance catapulted the album "Horizon" to the number 2 slot of the iTunes album charts overnight.

Furthermore, JOCO frequently appeared on television from 2014 through 2019. They performed one of their songs live on the TV-Show “ZDF MorgenMagazin” in Berlin twice, on the TV-Show "BR Abendschau" in Munich and on the TV-show "RBB Zibb" in Potsdam, Germany. They were also interviewed on the “ARD Tagesschau24” and "WDR Einsweitergefragt" radio shows. When they played at the Elbphilharmonie in February 2018, "NDR Hallo Niedersachsen" accompanied the sisters. The sisters were featured on the TV-show "ARD Brisant", airing to an audience of around 2.46 million viewers.

== Discography ==
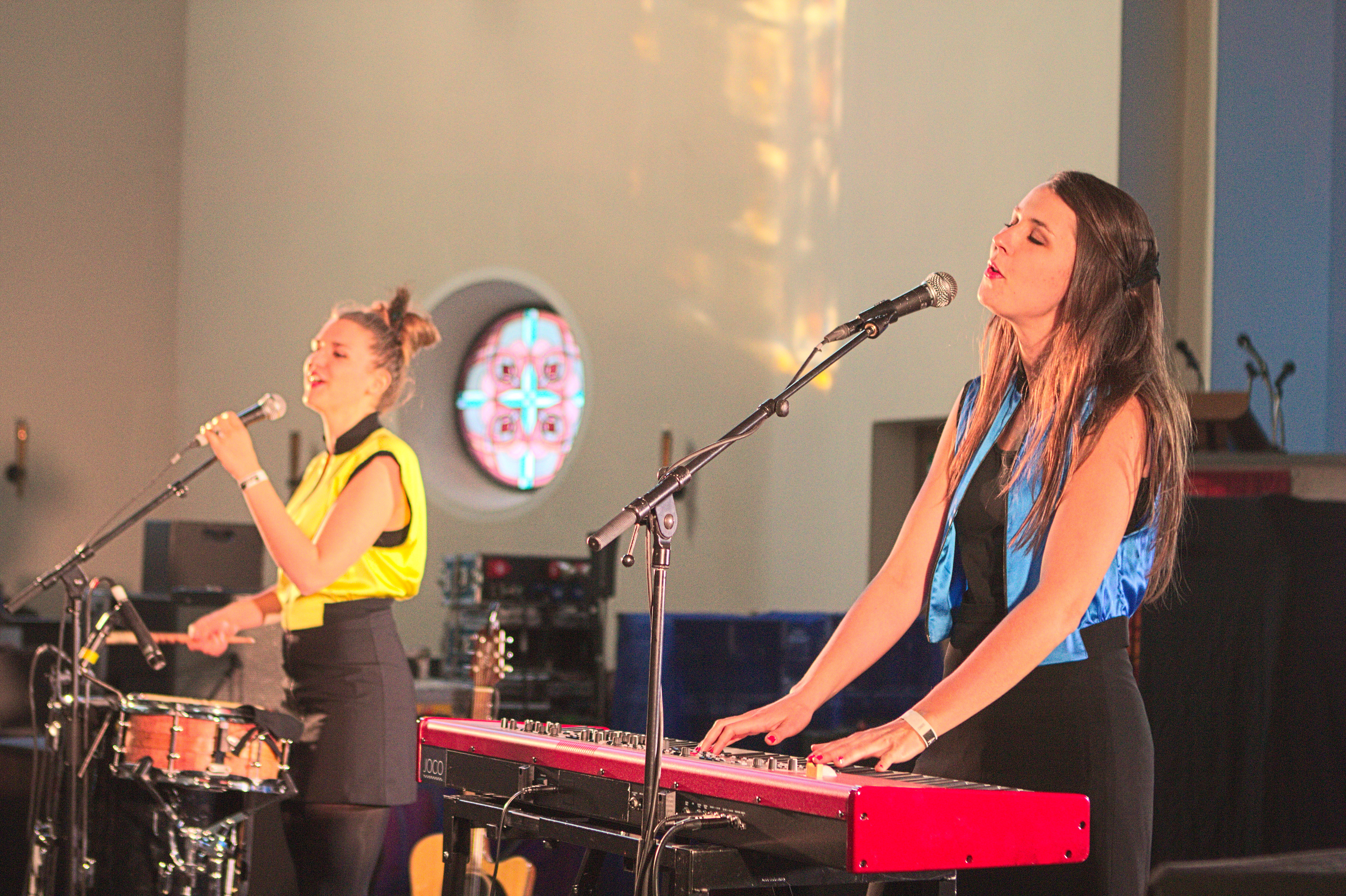
Joco performs at the Way Back When Festival in 2015

Albums:

- 2015: Horizon (Sony Music, Columbia)
- 2017: Into the Deep (Sony Music, Columbia)

Singles:

- 2015: Pilot
- 2015: Why didn't I See
- 2017: Racquet
- 2017: Kopfkarussell

Live videos:

- 2012: Winter
- 2015: We draw a Line
- 2015: Over the Horizon
- 2017: Kopfkarussell
- 2018: Bavaria
- 2020: Jungle Drum (Emiliana Torrini Cover)

Official videos:

- 2015: Pilot
- 2015: Why didn't I See
- 2017: Racquet
