= House of Diehl =

New York-based fashion partnership

House of Diehl was the New York-based fashion partnership of Mary Jo Diehl and Roman Milišić. House of Diehl is one of those avant garde fashion labels whose clothes are more likely to be seen in an I-D editorial or on the back of Lady Gaga, than a department store. Their work has also been exhibited in numerous art environments, including the Massachusetts Museum of Contemporary Art, Deitch Projects gallery, the Priska C. Juschka gallery, and GAle GAtes et al.

They are best known for their rock'n'roll-style live fashion performance, called Instant Couture, with which they've supported Sonic Youth, and staged events at New York Fashion Week; at the Life Ball in Vienna, Austria. Competitive Instant Couture is called Style battling, a growing art form, which has given rise to the Style Wars- The Style Battle Championship Tour. Style Wars toured the US in Fall 2007, and again in 2009. International Style Wars battles have taken place in cities on all five continents.

== Style battling ==
Style battling is a rising art form originating in New York City, where young designers compete live on stage to create fashion outfits in less than 5 minutes from vintage material and unusual items. In a standard style battling event, 8 designers or design teams compete in one-on-one battles through three knockout rounds (the round of eight, the semi-finals, and the final), designing on professional models, who then walk the catwalk. A panel of style VIP judges and/or the audience determine the winner of each battle based on three criteria: innovation, performance, and It-factor.

The first national tour of this sport/art--called STYLE WARS: The Style Battle Championships--hit NYC, LA, San Francisco, Chicago, and Miami, in the fall of 2007. A Grand Finale in NYC in May 2008 crowned Miami designer Karelle Levy (of the krelwear label) as the first US Style Wars champion. (Denver's Style Wars winner was Project Runway runner-up Mondo Guerra.) The second US Tour took place in fall 2009. STYLE WARS 'style battles' have been staged worldwide, in cities including Buenos Aires, London, Johannesburg, and Singapore. House of Diehl are the producers of the STYLE WARS tour.
