= Sarah Diehl =

German writer, opinion journalist and film maker

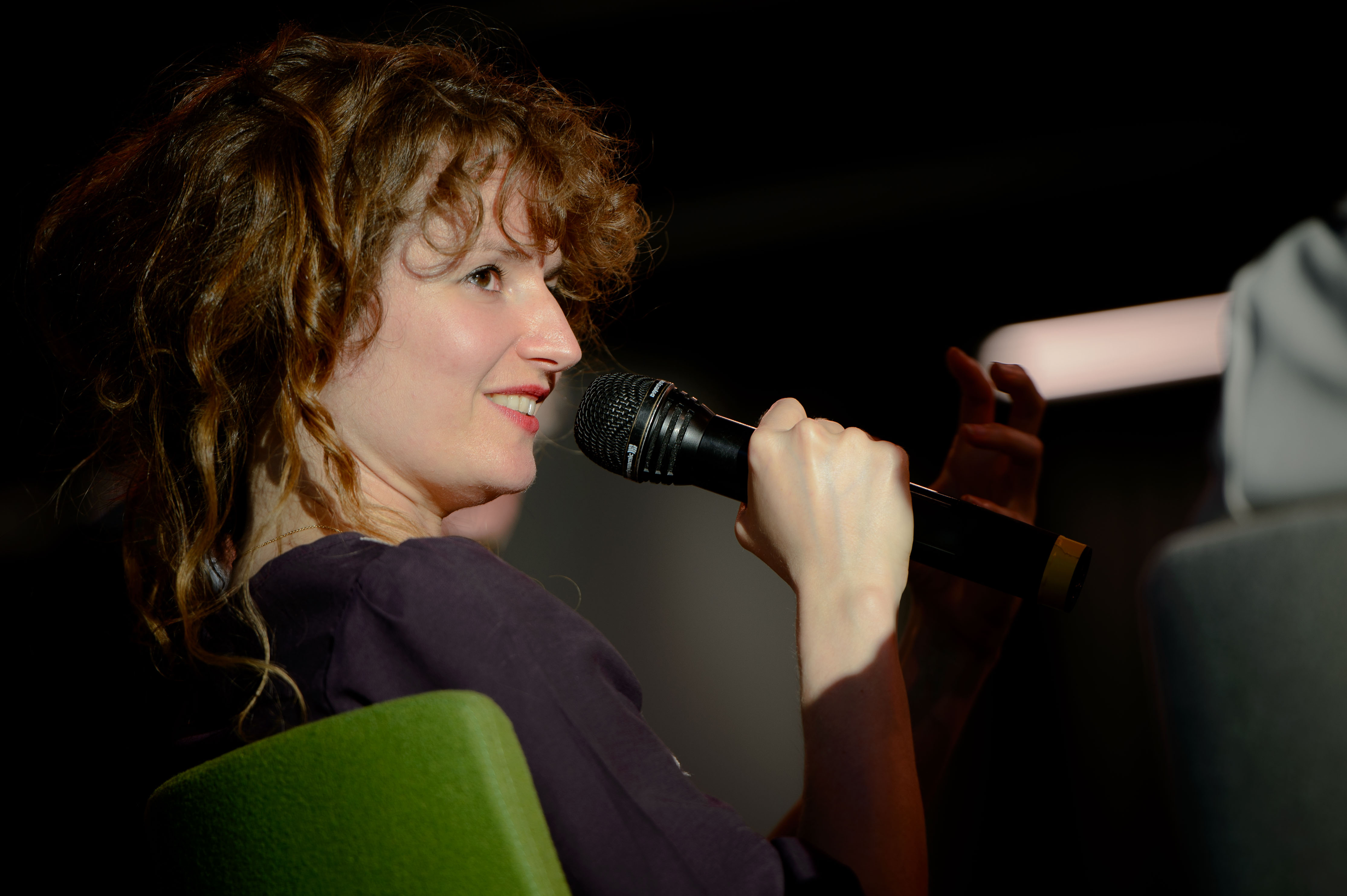
Image of Sarah Diehl

Sarah Diehl (born 1978 in Bad Camberg-Erbach) is a German publicist, author, cultural scientist and documentary filmmaker on the subject of international reproductive rights of women.

== Life ==
Diehl has a diploma in Museology and a master's degree in African Studies and Gender Studies. She has worked for Verbrecher Verlag on the publication of various anthologies (Kreuzbergbuch, Mittebuch and Neuköllnbuch). She is also the editor of Brüste Kriegen (Verbrecher Verlag, 2004), a collection of articles on how girls learn to deal with physical changes. In 2007, Alibri Verlag published the anthology Deproduktion - Schwangerschaftsabbruch im internationalen Kontext, which she edited; she has also written short stories and journalistic pieces for various publications. Sarah Diehl lives in Berlin.

In 2008, Sarah Diehl completed her documentary film Abortion Democracy - Poland/South Africa about the changes in abortion laws in South Africa and Poland and their impact on the reality of women's lives. In 2009, the film received an award at the XXIV. Black International Cinema Filmfestival in Berlin in 2009 for the best film by a German filmmaker. She is working on another documentary film Pregnant Journeys about women who help themselves to access safe abortion in Europe, Africa and Latin America.

In September 2012, her debut novel Eskimo Limon 9 was published, in which she tells the story of an Israeli family who move to the Hessian province for professional reasons. In 2014, her non-fiction book Die Uhr, die nicht tickt was published, an analysis of women's intentional childlessness.

She is a co-founder of Ciocia Basia, an organisation of Polish and German activists. They help women from Poland to have abortions in Germany, as these are illegal in Poland.
