= Napier Township, Pennsylvania =

Township in Pennsylvania, US

Coordinates: 40°02′57″N 78°38′28″W

- Township
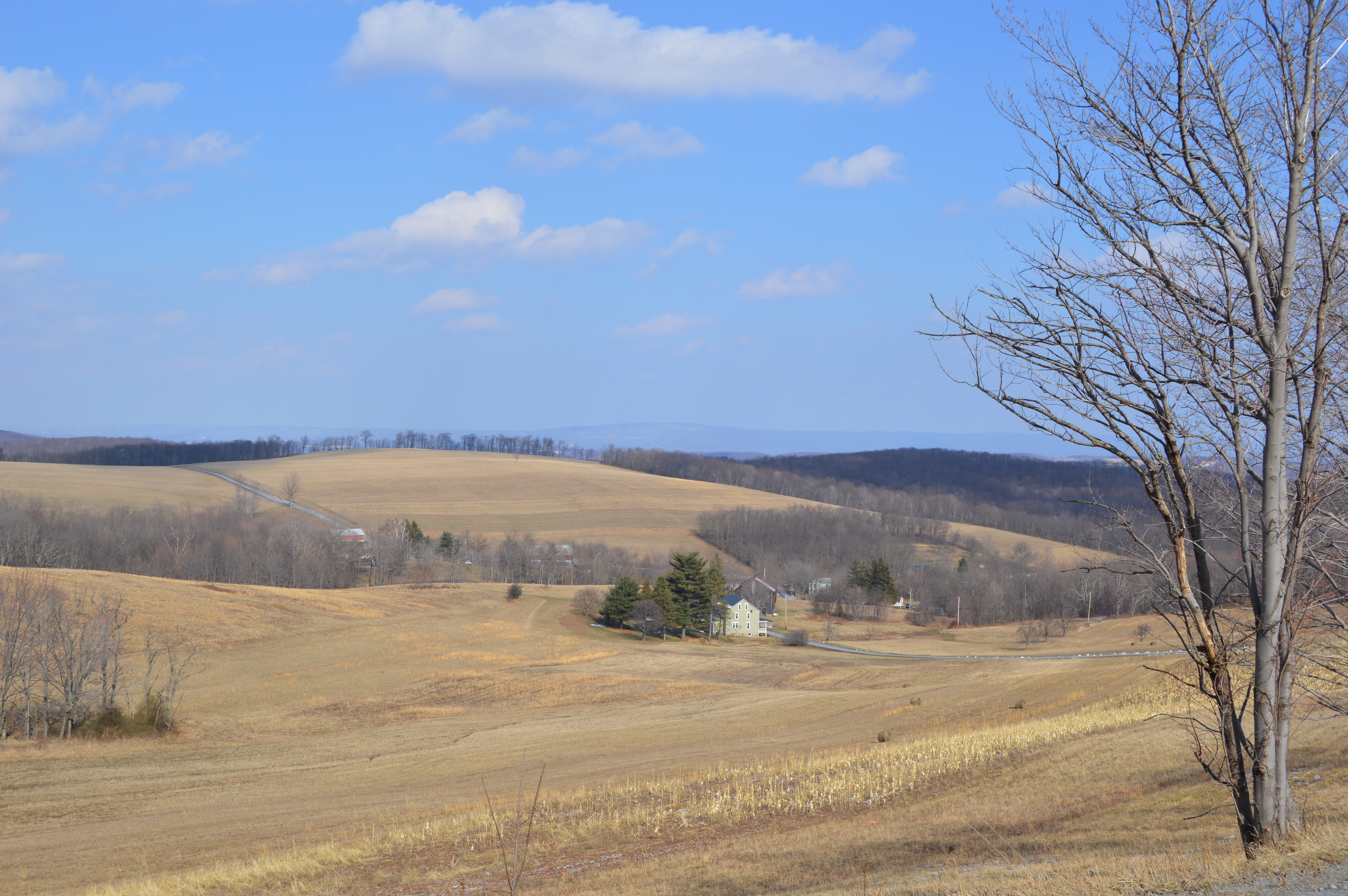
- Rolling hills northwest of Schellsburg

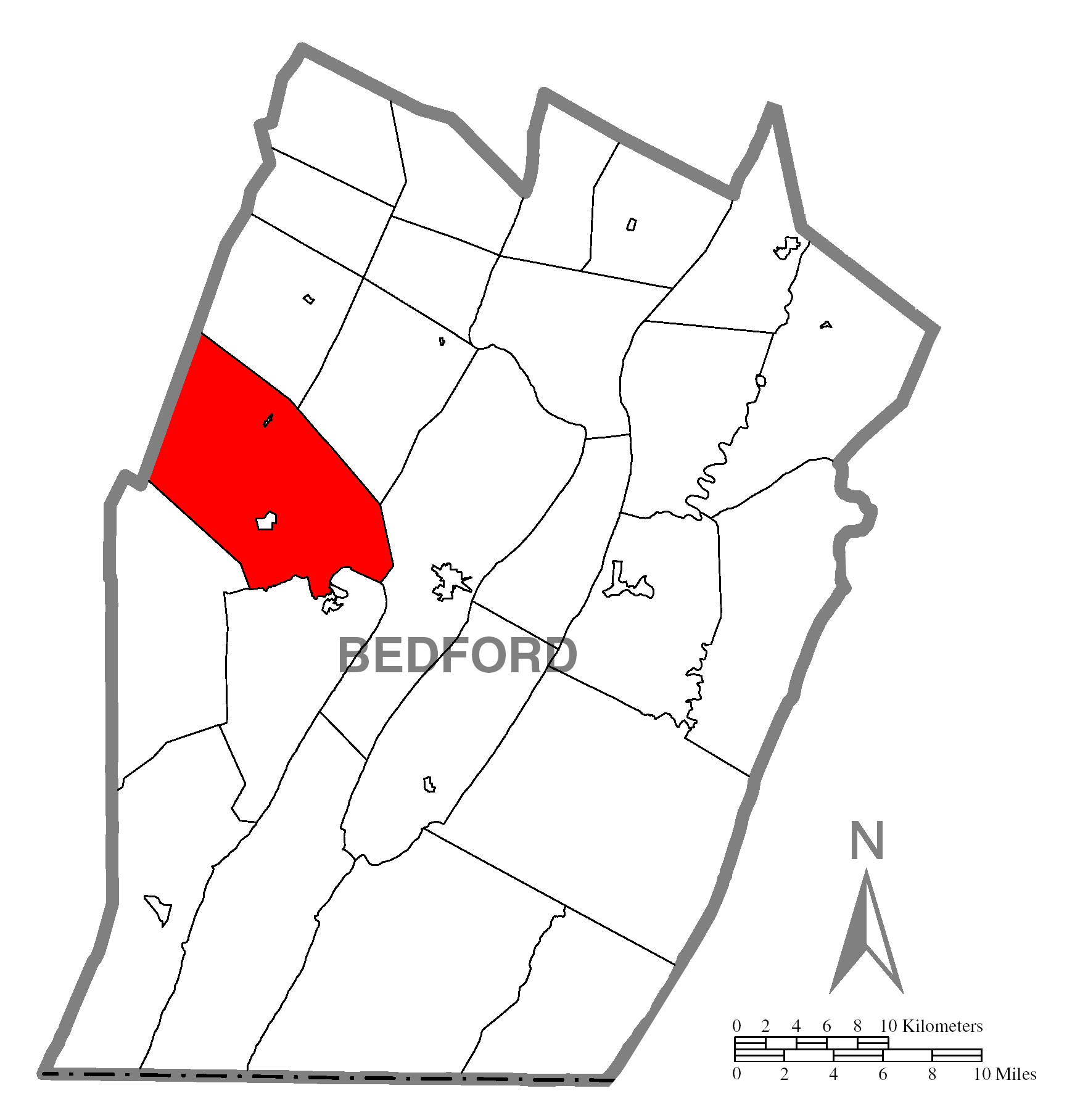
- Map of Bedford County, Pennsylvania highlighting Napier Township

- Map of Bedford County, Pennsylvania
- Country: United States
- State: Pennsylvania
- County: Bedford
- Settled: 1775
- Incorporated: 1812

Area
  - Total: 58.65 sq mi (151.90 km^{2})
  - Land: 57.78 sq mi (149.66 km^{2})
  - Water: 0.86 sq mi (2.24 km^{2})

Population (2020)
  - Total: 2,031 ▼
  - Estimate (2023): 2,027
  - Density: 36.9/sq mi (14.25/km^{2})
- Time zone: UTC-5 (Eastern (EST))
  - Summer (DST): UTC-4 (EDT)
- Area code: 814
- FIPS code: 42-009-52648

Napier Township is a township in Bedford County, Pennsylvania, United States. The population was 2,031 at the 2020 census.

== History ==
The Heirline Covered Bridge and New Paris Covered Bridge were listed on the National Register of Historic Places in 1980. Also listed are the Chestnut Ridge and Schellsburg Union Church and Cemetery and Bonnet's Tavern.

== Geography ==
Napier Township is located in western Bedford County. Its western border abuts Somerset County. The boroughs of Schellsburg and New Paris are surrounded by the township but are not part of it. A small part of the borough of Manns Choice borders the southern edge of the township.

According to the United States Census Bureau, the township has a total area of 58.6 square miles (151.9 km^{2}), of which 57.8 square miles (149.7 km^{2}) is land and 0.85 square miles (2.2 km^{2}), or 1.47%, is water.

== Demographics ==
Historical population
Census	Pop.	Note	%±
2010	2,198		—
2020	2,031		−7.6%
2023 (est.)	2,027		−0.2%
U.S. Decennial Census

As of the census of 2000, there were 2,145 people, 843 households, and 648 families residing in the township. The population density was 37.0 inhabitants per square mile (14.3/km^{2}). There were 1,156 housing units at an average density of 20.0 units per square mile (7.7 units/km^{2}). The racial makeup of the township was 98.74% White, 0.61% African American, 0.09% Native American, 0.23% Asian, 0.23% from other races, and 0.09% from two or more races. Hispanic or Latino of any race were 0.65% of the population.

There were 843 households, out of which 29.2% had children under the age of 18 living with them, 68.0% were married couples living together, 5.2% had a female householder with no husband present, and 23.1% were non-families. 20.6% of all households were made up of individuals, and 8.7% had someone living alone who was 65 years of age or older. The average household size was 2.53 and the average family size was 2.92.

In the township the population was spread out, with 22.0% under the age of 18, 5.8% from 18 to 24, 28.9% from 25 to 44, 27.8% from 45 to 64, and 15.6% who were 65 years of age or older. The median age was 41 years. For every 100 females there were 104.9 males. For every 100 females age 18 and over, there were 102.4 males.

The median income for a household in the township was $33,261, and the median income for a family was $38,674. Males had a median income of $30,964 versus $21,319 for females. The per capita income for the township was $16,036. About 6.3% of families and 10.0% of the population were below the poverty line, including 11.3% of those under age 18 and 13.7% of those age 65 or over.
