= Diehls Covered Bridge =

- U.S. National Register of Historic Places
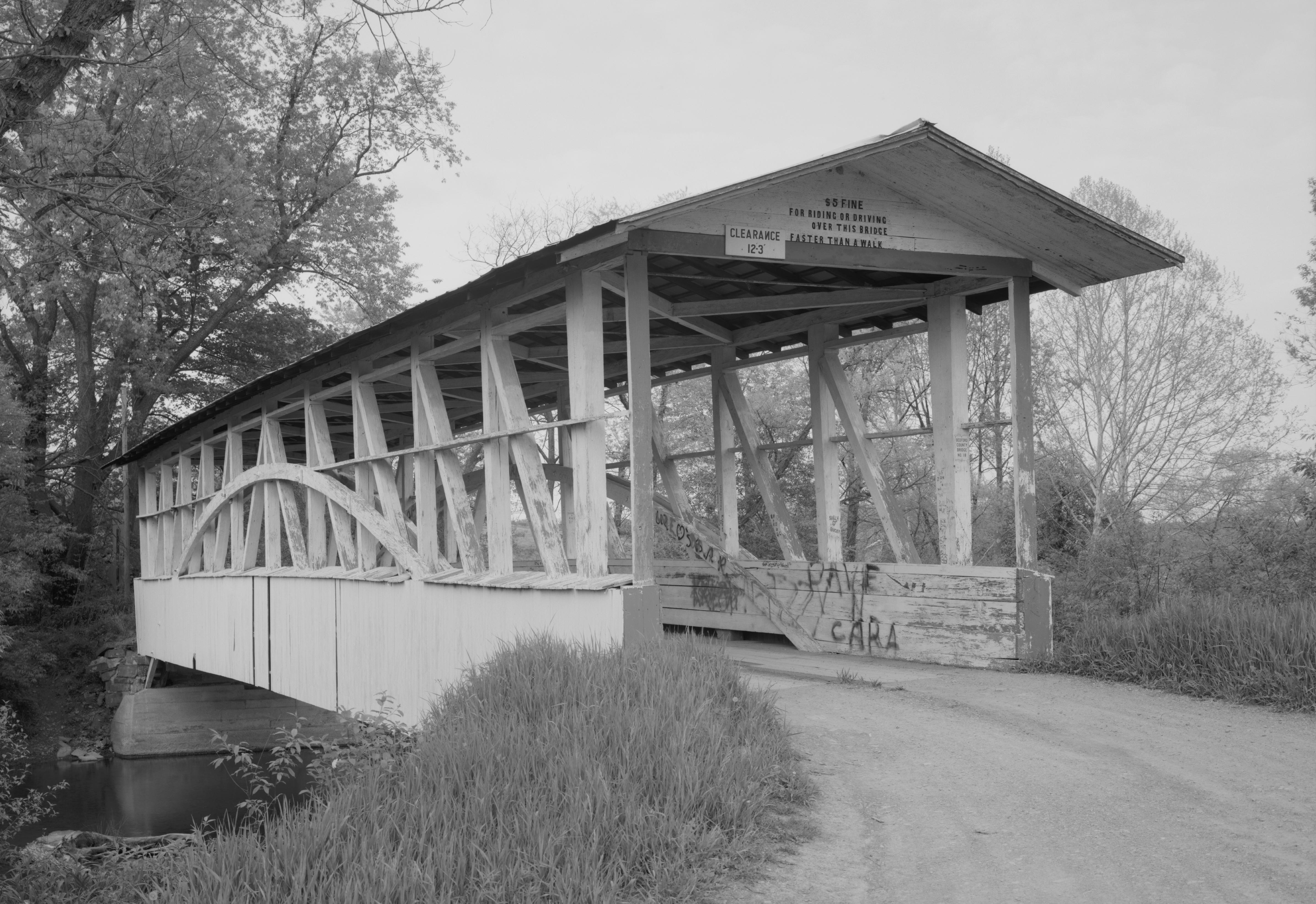
- Diehls Covered Bridge, 1994

- Location within Pennsylvania Location within the United States
- Location: South of Schellsburg on Legislative Route 09057, east of New Buena Vista, Harrison Township, Pennsylvania
- Coordinates: 40°0′34″N 78°38′55″W
- Area: less than one acre
- MPS: Bedford County Covered Bridges TR
- NRHP reference No.: 80003420
- Added to NRHP: April 10, 1980

The Diehls Covered Bridge, also known as Turner's Bridge, is a historic wooden covered bridge located at Harrison Township in Bedford County, Pennsylvania. It is a 88.3-foot-long (26.9 m), Burr Truss bridge with a shallow gable roof, constructed in 1892. It crosses the Raystown Branch Juniata River. It is one of 15 historic covered bridges in Bedford County.

It was listed on the National Register of Historic Places in 1980.

== Popular culture ==
Diehl's Bridge is featured in the opening scenes of the anthology television series that was created by George A. Romero, Tales from the Darkside.

== See also ==
- List of bridges documented by the Historic American Engineering Record in Pennsylvania
