= Huston Diehl =

Huston Diehl (1948–2010) was Professor of English and CLAS Collegiate Fellow at the University of Iowa.

Diehl received a B.A. from Colorado College (1970), a M.A. from Duke University (1971), as well a Ph.D. in English from Duke (1975). She was a noted specialist in sixteenth- and seventeenth-century English literature, writing and lecturing on the theatrical, visual, and religious cultures of early modern England. Diehl's books include An Index of Icons in English Emblem Books (1986), and Staging Reform, Reforming the Stage: Protestantism and Popular Theater in Early Modern England (1997), which was named an "Outstanding Academic Book of 1997." Diehl was also the author of the 2007 memoir, Dream Not of Other Worlds, about teaching in a segregated black elementary school in rural Virginia, in 1970.

Diehl was the recipient of many awards and honors, including a National Endowment for the Humanities Fellowship in 1978-79 and the University of Iowa's Excellence in Teaching Award in 1989.
