= Karl Diehl (economist) =

German economist and professor

Karl Diehl (March 27, 1864, Frankfurt – May 12, 1943 in Freiburg im Breisgau) was a German economist and professor who taught from 1908 until his death in Freiburg. He taught at the universities of Heidelberg and Freiburg, known for teaching on the subject of anarchism.

The motivating force behind his scholarship was that academia must counter the idea that "... anarchism represents a criminal sect which lacks any social or political programme ...". According to one historian on German reformers, Diehl had acquired a reputation as the "most important authority on socialism, communism, and anarchism," comparable only to Werner Sombart.

== Life ==
His son is Karl Diehl, the German actor.

== Theory ==
=== On Economic History ===
Joseph Schumpeter, the well-known economist, has praised Karl Diehl for his understanding of the mutualist Pierre-Joseph Proudhon, writing "Of the Proudhon literature, I mention only a work of indubitable scholarly quality, though there are several others that come within this category: Karl Diehl's P. J. Proudhon." A reviewer summarized Diehl's opinion of Proudhon with "the chief importance of Proudhon lies in and ends with the influence he exercised on his contemporaries," with more emphasis on his theoretical ideas than on those who tried to implement them with dynamite. The 1899 publication of the Palgrave-macmillan Dictionary of Political Economy lists Diehl second when listing authors who have contributed "critical works on the life and doctrine of Proudhon."

Christian Gehrke lists Karl Diehl first, when listing the main, European adherents of David Ricardo's economics, in the fourth quarter of nineteenth-century academia.

=== On the Origin of Anarchism ===
In 1890, Diehl came to realize that William Godwin was the father of the Anarchist movement and theory, early sparking his interest in this area of thought. This may mean he is the first to attempt to suggest that Anarchism was born out of the coldly-logical, rights-based political theory in Britain, instead of what was traditionally believed by historians, namely, that Anarchism was an outgrowth of the terrorism and disorder of the hot-blooded French Revolution.

=== On the Theory of Price and Value in Germany ===
Diehl was well-esteemed by economists by his contributions to the development of the Theory of Price and Value in Germany in the nineteenth century, based on his contributions to Festchrift.

=== On the German Anarchist Movement ===
Diehl in well-quoted in Anarchist publications regarding Anarchism in Germany. He is quoted by one editor in a volume on German Anarchism as saying...

Anarchist ideas evoked a certain amount of theoretical interest and discussion. But the anarchist movement in Germany never achieved any significant political activity, nor did the group organizations at any time approach a numerical size which could be considered important.

=== On Planned Economy ===
Diehl's theories regarding Socialist planned economy eventually turned out to be useful "to those Soviet economists who dealt actually with the questions of the theory of rent in their own country."
