= 2007 FIVB World Grand Prix squads =

This article show all participating team squads at the 2007 FIVB Women's Volleyball World Grand Prix, played by twelve countries with the final round held in Ningbo, China.

== Brazil ==
- Head Coach: José Roberto Guimarães

#	Name	Date of Birth	Height	Weight	Spike	Block
1	Walewska Oliveira	01.10.1979	190	73	310	290
2	Carolina Albuquerque (c)	25.07.1977	182	76	289	279
3	Marianne Steinbrecher	23.08.1983	188	70	310	290
4	Paula Pequeno	22.01.1982	184	74	302	285
5	Caroline Gattaz	27.07.1981	191	87	304	280
6	Thaisa Menezes	15.05.1987	196	79	316	301
7	Hélia Souza	10.03.1970	173	63	283	264
8	Fabiola de Souza	03.02.1983	184	70	300	285
9	Fabiana Claudino	24.01.1985	193	76	314	293
10	Welissa Gonzaga	09.09.1982	179	76	300	287
11	Erika Coimbra	23.03.1980	180	64	301	280
12	Jaqueline Carvalho	31.12.1983	186	70	302	286
13	Sheilla Castro	01.07.1983	185	64	302	284
14	Fabiana de Oliveira	07.03.1980	169	59	276	266
15	Regiane Bidias	02.10.1986	189	74	304	286
16	Natalia Pereira	24.04.1989	183	76	300	288
17	Renata Colombo	25.02.1981	181	78	305	293
18	Joyce Silva	13.06.1984	190	67	311	294
19	Arlene Xavier	20.12.1969	177	74	299	290

== China ==
- Head Coach: Chen Zhonghe

#	Name	Date of Birth	Height	Weight	Spike	Block
1	Wang Yimei	11.01.1988	190	90	318	205
2	Han Xu	28.10.1987	180	60	305	296
3	Yang Hao	21.03.1980	183	75	319	314
4	Liu Yanan	29.09.1980	186	73	320	313
5	Wei Qiuyue	26.09.1988	182	65	305	300
6	Xu Yunli	02.08.1987	196	85	313	306
7	Zhou Suhong (c)	23.04.1979	182	75	313	305
8	Xue Ming	23.02.1987	193	68	322	310
9	Zhang Yuehong	09.11.1975	182	73	324	322
10	Sun Xiaoqing	05.01.1985	187	70	310	305
11	Li Juan	15.05.1981	187	73	315	307
15	Zhang Xian	16.03.1985	167	57	290	286
16	Zhang Na	19.04.1980	180	72	302	292
17	Ma Yunwen	19.10.1986	189	70	315	307

== Chinese Taipei ==
- Head Coach: Jeng Fang Fann

#	Name	Date of Birth	Height	Weight	Spike	Block
1	Yeh Hui Hsuan	24.04.1988	182	72	285	275
2	Lin Chun Yi	26.09.1983	183	65	298	288
3	Chen Hui Chen	23.04.1988	173	65	280	270
4	Lin Wen Yu	21.11.1982	169	55	280	270
5	Wu Ya Chieh	03.10.1982	170	67	281	272
6	Chen Mei Ching	19.05.1985	182	68	297	285
7	Kou Nai Han (c)	21.03.1982	173	60	295	280
8	Chang Yi Chieh	11.06.1979	177	64	298	288
9	Liu Li Fang	05.07.1982	172	74	284	273
10	Szu Hui Fang	29.01.1984	168	60	280	270
11	Chang Hui Min	08.10.1979	174	58	295	285
12	Tsai Yin Feng	06.11.1984	181	69	290	280
13	Tseng Hua Yu	06.10.1986	177	63	292	284
14	Chiu Wen Ying	10.04.1988	158	58	280	271
15	Chang Chen Yin	28.03.1991	180	67	292	280
16	Chen Wan Ting	25.11.1990	178	64	288	276
17	Lin Yi Shan	28.06.1986	173	65	284	275
18	Lin Ching I	20.11.1985	180	66	295	283

== Cuba ==
- Head Coach: Antonio Perdomo

#	Name	Date of Birth	Height	Weight	Spike	Block
1	Yumilka Ruiz (c)	08.05.1978	180	63	326	305
2	Yanelis Santos	30.03.1986	183	71	315	312
3	Nancy Carrillo	11.01.1986	190	74	318	315
4	Yenisey González	23.08.1983	193	67	315	312
5	Dayesi Maso	04.04.1990	184	69	314	280
6	Daimí Ramírez	08.10.1983	176	67	305	290
7	Lisbet Arredondo	22.11.1987	181	62	315	312
8	Yaima Ortiz	09.11.1981	179	70	325	313
9	Rachel Sánchez	09.01.1989	188	75	325	320
10	Yusleinis Herrera	12.03.1984	180	67	312	310
11	Liana Mesa Luaces	26.12.1977	179	70	318	307
12	Rosir Calderón	28.12.1984	191	66	330	325
13	Yisel Cabrera	02.10.1984	180	66	308	304
14	Kenia Carcaces	22.01.1986	188	69	308	306
15	Yusidey Silié	11.11.1984	183	80	316	300
16	Ana Lidia Cleger	27.11.1989	183	69	300	285
17	Gyselle Silva	29.10.1991	184	70	302	295
18	Zoila Barros	06.08.1976	188	76	325	312

== Dominican Republic ==
- Head Coach: Beato Miguel Cruz

#	Name	Date of Birth	Height	Weight	Spike	Block
1	Annerys Vargas	07.08.1981	194	70	325	315
2	Rosalín Ángeles	23.07.1985	189	61	310	300
3	Dahiana Burgos	07.04.1985	188	58	312	302
4	Sidarka Núñez	25.06.1984	188	58	312	308
5	Brenda Castillo	05.06.1992	167	55	220	270
6	Carmen Rosa Caso	29.11.1981	168	59	243	241
7	Sofía Mercedes	25.05.1976	185	70	306	298
8	Gina Del Rosario	12.05.1986	189	61	310	300
9	Nuris Arias	20.05.1973	190	78	315	306
10	Milagros Cabral	17.10.1978	181	63	308	305
11	Juana González	03.01.1979	185	70	295	290
12	Karla Echenique	16.05.1986	181	62	279	273
13	Cindy Rondón	12.11.1988	189	61	312	305
14	Prisilla Rivera	29.12.1984	186	70	312	308
15	Cosiri Rodríguez (c)	30.08.1977	191	72	313	305
16	Kenia Moreta	07.04.1981	191	76	310	305
17	Altagracia Mambrú	21.01.1989	180	55	312	302
18	Bethania de la Cruz	13.05.1989	188	58	322	305

== Italy ==
- Head Coach: Massimo Barbolini

#	Name	Date of Birth	Height	Weight	Spike	Block
1	Simona Gioli	17.09.1977	185	72	307	283
2	Valentina Arrighetti	26.01.1985	185	62	294	280
3	Paola Croce	06.03.1978	167	52	290	265
5	Sara Anzanello	30.07.1980	193	78	316	298
6	Valentina Fiorin	09.10.1984	187	69	305	287
7	Martina Guiggi	01.05.1984	183	69	315	290
8	Jenny Barazza	24.07.1981	188	77	300	285
9	Manuela Secolo	22.02.1977	180	70	302	279
11	Serena Ortolani	07.01.1987	187	63	308	288
12	Taismary Agüero	05.03.1977	177	69	322	300
13	Francesca Ferretti	15.02.1984	180	70	296	280
14	Eleonora Lo Bianco (c)	22.12.1979	172	70	287	273
15	Antonella Del Core	05.11.1980	180	73	296	279
17	Giulia Rondon	16.10.1987	189	77	304	280

== Japan ==
- Head Coach: Shoichi Yanagimoto

#	Name	Date of Birth	Height	Weight	Spike	Block
1	Megumi Kurihara	31.07.1984	186	69	305	285
3	Yoshie Takeshita (c)	18.03.1978	159	52	280	270
4	Megumi Itabashi	07.06.1973	166	60	281	272
5	Miyuki Takahashi	25.12.1978	170	65	290	285
6	Sugayama Kaoru	26.12.1978	169	57	293	269
7	Makiko Horai	06.01.1979	187	68	312	300
8	Asako Tajimi
10	Kumiko Sakino	23.09.1975	180	66	315	308
11	Erika Araki	03.08.1984	186	79	307	298
12	Saori Kimura	19.08.1986	184	66	298	293
13	Miki Shimada	29.03.1983	185	70	298	293
14	Shuka Oyama	25.09.1980	182	68	315	309
15	Mari Ochiai	04.01.1982	179	63	301	294
16	Kanako Omura
17	Yuko Sano
18	Yuki Shoji

== Kazakhstan ==
- Head Coach: Evgeny Sivkov

#	Name	Date of Birth	Height	Weight	Spike	Block
1	Natalya Zhukova	29.03.1980	184	70	305	285
2	Tatyana Pyurova	06.04.1982	182	67	305	295
3	Olga Ustimenko	06.03.1976	185	79	300	290
4	Olga Karpova	10.06.1980	185	64	300	290
5	Yuliya Kutsko	18.04.1980	191	74	305	295
6	Olga Nassedkina	28.12.1982	191	75	305	295
8	Korinna Ishimtseva	08.02.1984	184	73	280	275
9	Xeniya Ilyuchshenko	29.05.1979	180	70	300	250
10	Yelena Ezau	09.03.1983	175	55	285	275
11	Olga Grushko	07.04.1976	180	70	305	295
12	Irina Zaitseva	25.09.1982	185	66	305	290
13	Yelena Pavlova (c)	12.12.1978	184	70	315	290
14	Mariya Kovalchuk	15.09.1983	183	66	295	285
15	Alyona Ryabova	13.08.1988	198	67	305	300
16	Inna Matveyeva	12.10.1978	186	74	305	295
17	Xeniya Imangaliyeva	24.05.1981	183	65	303	290
18	Alexandra Dzigalyuk	29.03.1970	180	65	285	275
19	Olga Serebrennikova	07.06.1985	182	78	300	290

== Netherlands ==
- Head Coach: Avital Selinger

#	Name	Date of birth	Height	Weight	Spike	Block
1	Kim Staelens	07.01.1982	182	78	305	301
2	Suzanne Freriks	16.09.1984	178	63	280	270
3	Francien Huurman	18.04.1975	192	76	320	292
4	Chaïne Staelens	07.11.1980	194	77	316	299
5	Sanna Visser	02.05.1984	185	76	308	285
6	Mirjam Orsel	01.04.1978	192	74	306	292
8	Alice Blom	07.04.1980	178	64	305	270
9	Floortje Meijners	16.01.1987	189	77	313	283
10	Janneke van Tienen	29.05.1979	176	73	293	273
11	Caroline Wensink	04.08.1984	186	76	309	281
12	Manon Flier	08.02.1984	191	73	311	301
13	Judith Pietersen	03.07.1989	187	72	309	301
14	Riëtte Fledderus	18.10.1977	171	75	288	268
15	Ingrid Visser (c)	04.06.1977	191	74	312	292
16	Debby Stam	24.07.1984	184	70	303	281
18	Susan van den Heuvel	22.02.1884	191	78	310	284
19	Nikki Hoevenaars	10.11.1988	186	73	295	284

== Poland ==
- Head Coach: Marco Bonitta

#	Name	Date of Birth	Height	Weight	Spike	Block
1	Katarzyna Skowrońska	30.06.1983	189	75	314	296
2	Mariola Zenik	03.07.1982	174	64	300	290
3	Eleonora Dziękiewicz	25.10.1978	185	75	307	295
4	Izabela Bełcik	29.11.1980	185	65	304	292
5	Joanna Kuligowska	25.11.1979	182	64	299	285
6	Anna Podolec	30.10.1985	193	71	318	305
7	Joanna Frąckowiak	04.07.1986	185	67	307	293
8	Dorota Świeniewicz	27.07.1972	180	64	315	305
9	Agnieszka Bednarek	20.02.1986	185	70	309	292
10	Agnieszka Kosmatka	17.08.1978	188	75	312	305
11	Magdalena Godos	12.09.1983	181	67	300	281
12	Milena Sadurek	18.10.1984	177	65	302	295
13	Milena Rosner (c)	04.01.1980	179	67	307	292
14	Maria Liktoras	20.02.1975	191	73	312	302
15	Agata Sawicka	17.01.1985	180	64	295	277
16	Zuzanna Efimienko	08.08.1989	196	74	313	304
17	Dominika Leśniewicz	13.01.1974	174	65	277	268
18	Joanna Staniucha	05.12.1981	184	76	303	290
19	Klaudia Kaczorowska	20.12.1988	184	68	303	281

== Russia ==
- Head Coach: Nataphon Srisamutnak

#	Name	Date of Birth	Height	Weight	Spike	Block
1	Yulia Sedova	08.01.1985	192	75	308	300
2	Lesya Makhno	04.09.1981	188	73	310	305
3	Natalia Alimova	09.12.1978	192	78	315	308
4	Olga Fateeva	04.05.1984	190	72	310	303
5	Lioubov Sokolova	04.12.1977	192	72	315	307
6	Yelena Godina	17.09.1977	196	72	317	310
7	Natalya Safronova (c)	06.02.1979	190	77	312	305
8	Yekaterina Margatskaya	22.11.1984	185	70	305	200
9	Svetlana Kryuchkova	21.02.1985	174	63	290	286
10	Olga Sazhina	19.02.1986	188	71	297	292
11	Yekaterina Gamova	17.10.1980	202	80	321	310
12	Yevgeniya Startseva	12.02.1989	185	68	303	294
13	Svetlana Akulova	10.04.1984	180	68	297	287
14	Yekaterina Kabeshova	05.08.1986	172	66	279	270
15	Tatiana Kosheleva	23.12.1988	191	67	315	305
16	Yulia Merkulova	17.02.1984	202	75	317	308
17	Ekaterina Gromova	13.09.1986	192	79	312	303
18	Marina Akulova	13.12.1985	181	70	303	290
19	Anna Ivanova	20.11.1987	191	75	310	305

== United States ==
- Head Coach: Lang Ping

#	Name	Date of Birth	Height	Weight	Spike	Block
1	Ogonna Nnamani	29.07.1983	185	80	315	305
2	Danielle Scott	01.10.1972	188	84	325	302
3	Tayyiba Haneef	23.03.1979	201	80	318	299
4	Charnette Fair	29.06.1979	180	82	318	308
5	Kristen Michaelis	03.10.1982	180	69	310	306
6	Norisha Campbell	21.09.1980	190	77	315	302
7	Heather Bown	29.11.1978	188	90	301	290
8	Katherine Wilkins	10.05.1982	193	81	309	299
9	Jennifer Joines	23.11.1982	191	82	315	301
10	Kimberly Glass	18.08.1984	190	75	314	299
11	Robyn Ah Mow (c)	15.09.1975	172	68	291	281
12	Nancy Metcalf	12.11.1978	186	73	314	292
13	Kathleen Olsovsky	03.01.1982	188	75	309	295
14	Candace Lee	12.07.1984	170	64	290	270
15	Nicole Davis	24.04.1982	167	73	284	266
17	Courtney Thompson	04.11.1984	173	65	276	263
19	Sydney Anderson	30.12.1987	185	70	312	303
