= Ryabov =

Ryabov (Russian: Рябов) is a Russian masculine surname, its feminine counterpart is Ryabova. It may refer to

- Alexander Ryabov (born 1979), Russian ice hockey player
- Alyona Ryabova (born 1988), Kazakhstani volleyball player
- Anastasia Ryabova (born 1985), Russian artist
- Andrey Ryabov (born 1969), Russian football player
- Ekaterina Ryabova (born 1997), Russian singer
- Georgi Ryabov (1938–2020), Soviet football player
- Sergei Ryabov (born 1977), Russian film director, artist and animator
- Vyacheslav Ryabov (born 1989), Ukrainian football player
- Yakov Ryabov (1928–2018), Soviet politician
- Yekaterina Ryabova (1921–1974), Russian military pilot
