= Andrei Ryabov =

Andrei Ryabov may refer to:

- Andrey Ryabov (born 1969), Russian footballer
- Andrei Ryabov (musician) (born 1962), Russian-born jazz guitarist
