= Aleksandr Ryabov =

Aleksandr Ryabov may refer to:

- Aleksandr Ryabov (athlete)
- Aleksandr Ryabov (politician)

== See also ==
- Alexander Ryabov, Russian ice hockey player
