= List of Florida State University athletes =

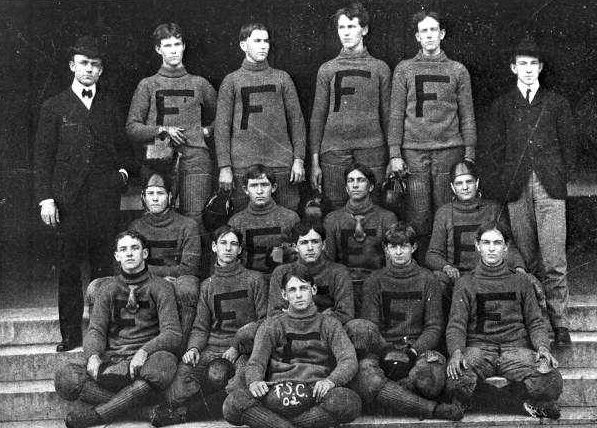
Florida State's first football team, "The Eleven"

Florida State University has graduated a large number of athletes. This includes graduates, non-graduate former students and current students of Florida State who are notable for their achievements within athletics, sometimes before or after their time at Florida State. Other alumni can be found in the list of Florida State University alumni; notable administration, faculty, and staff can be found on the list of Florida State University faculty. Intercollegiate sports teams at Florida State are called "Seminoles", and are run by the Florida State Athletics. The Athletics program runs Florida State's Hall of Fame, which has inducted many of FSU's greatest players throughout the program's history.

As a major competitor in college athletics, Florida State University has many notable alumni including student athletes, coaches and staff members. Many of the most notable members are listed in FSU's Hall of Fame and represent all major collegiate sports. A number of FSU alumni have found success in professional sports, with 123 active alumni competing in sports including basketball, football, baseball and golf. In addition, FSU has produced three Heisman Trophy winners in Chris Weinke, Charlie Ward, and Jameis Winston. Notable Seminoles in professional golf include Brooks Koepka, back to back U.S. Open champion (2017, 2018), Jeff Sluman, and Hubert Green, and Paul Azinger, PGA Championship(1993) and Ryder Cup Captain(2008).

== American football ==
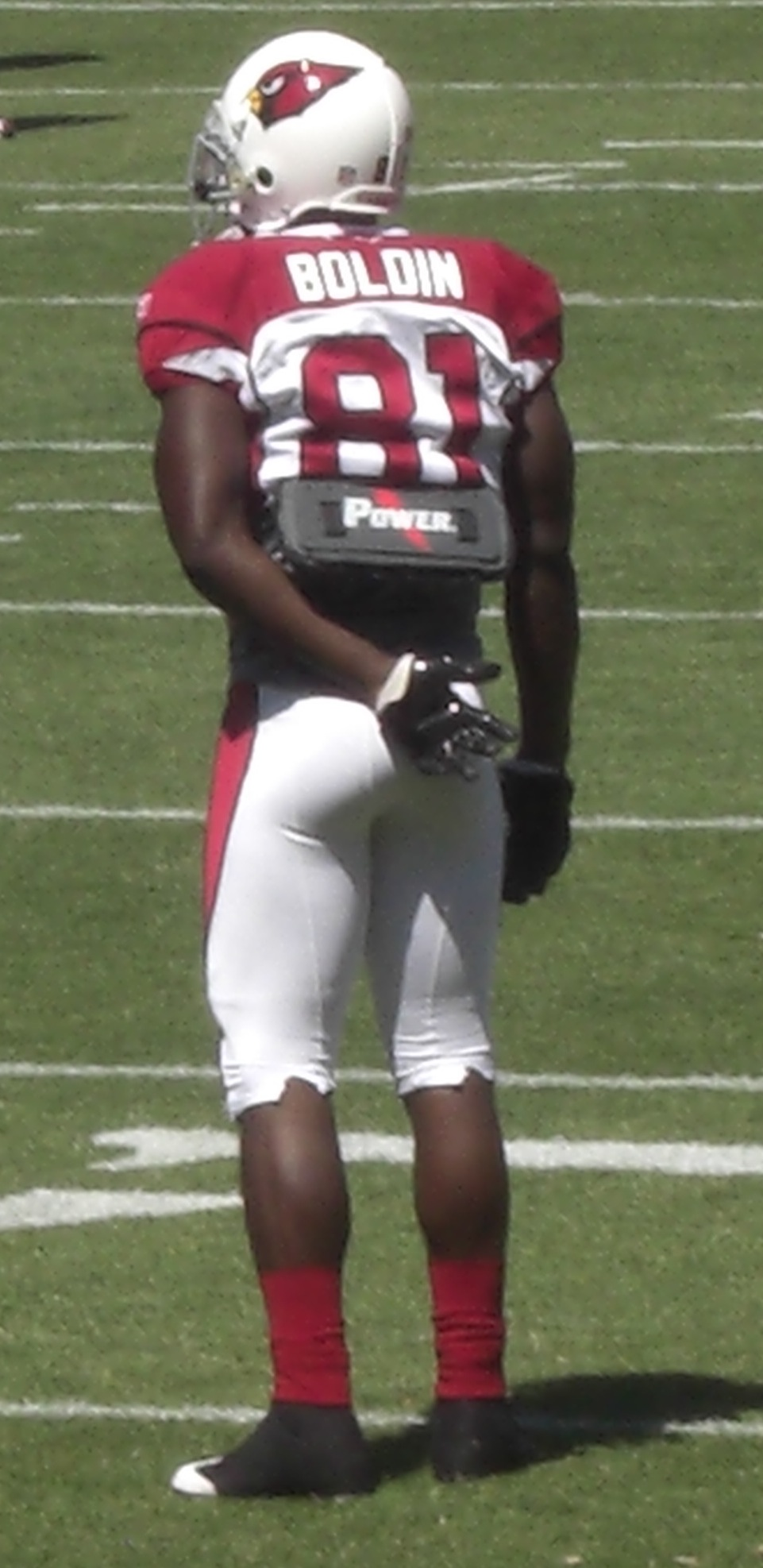
Anquan Boldin

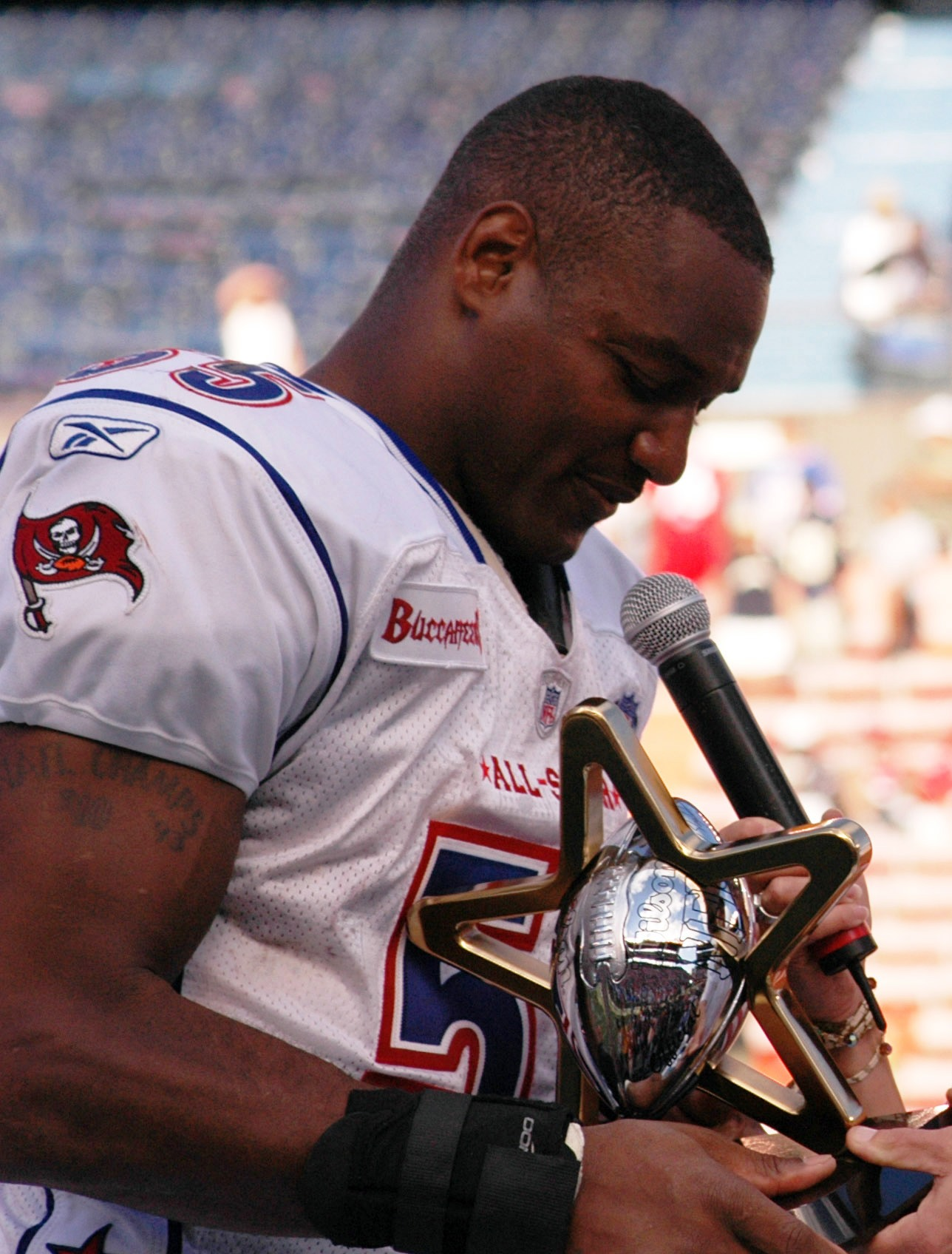
Derrick Brooks

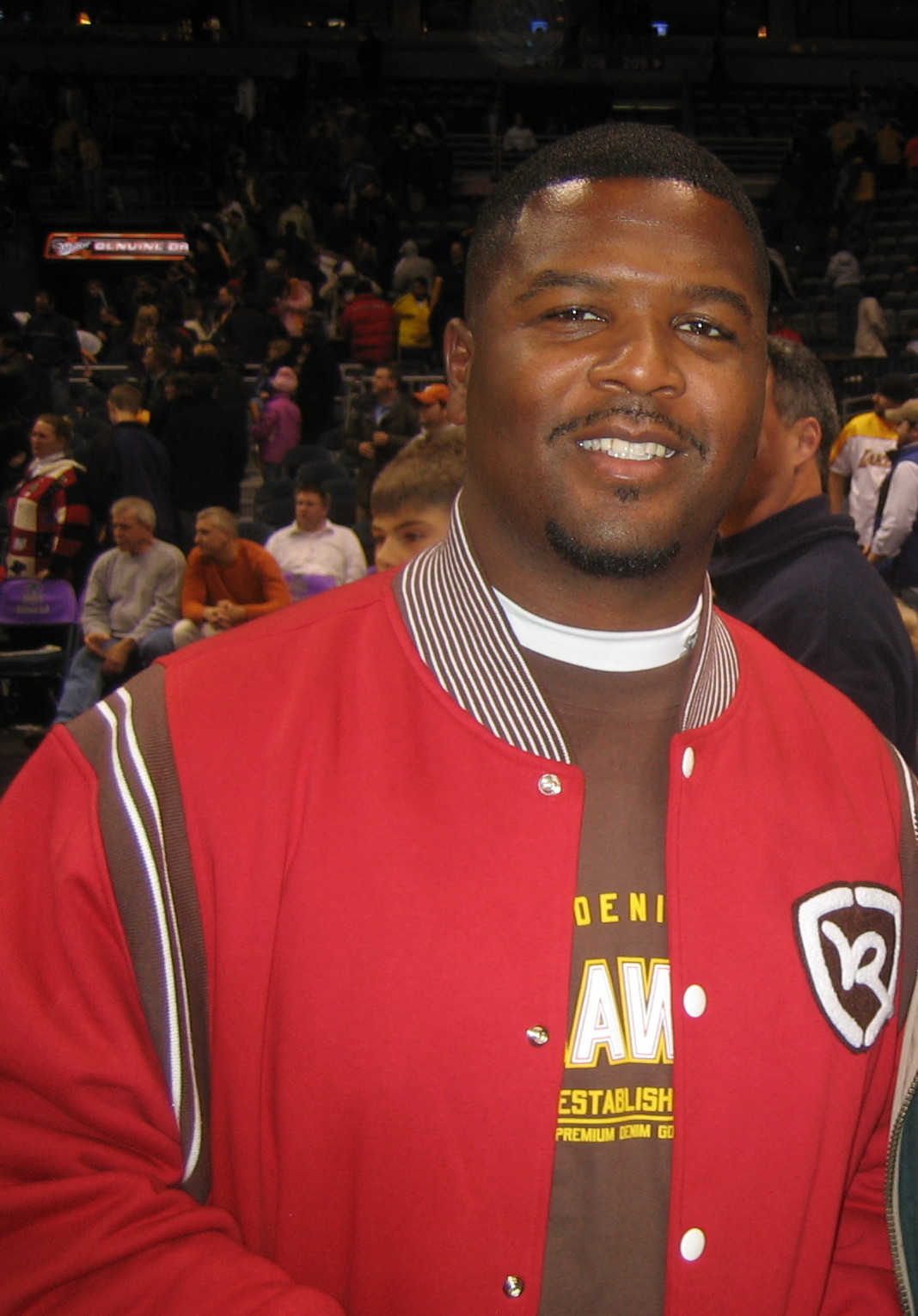
LeRoy Butler

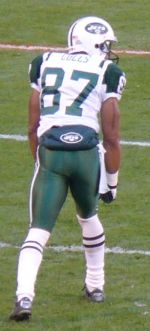
Laveranues Coles

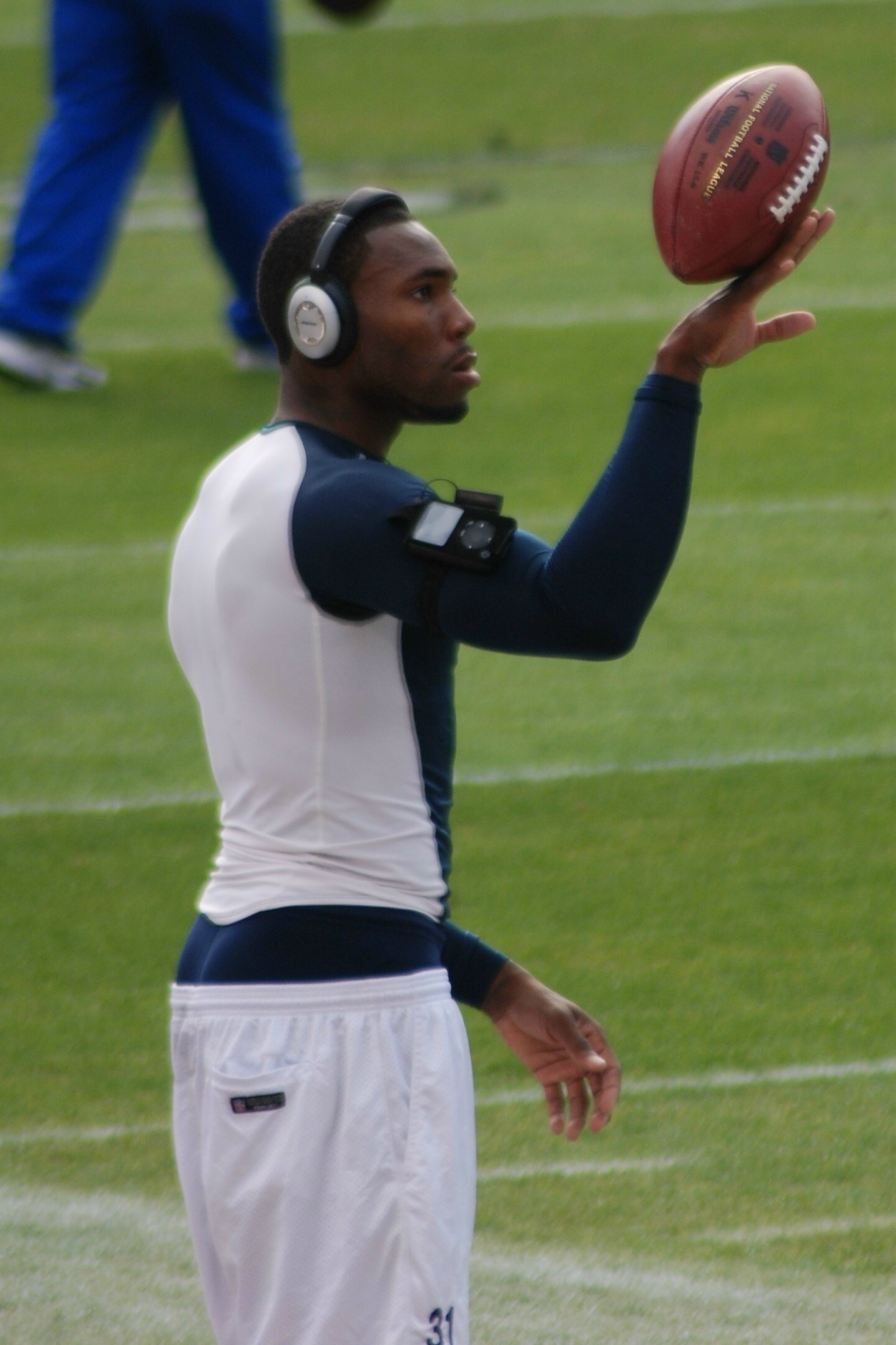
Antonio Cromartie

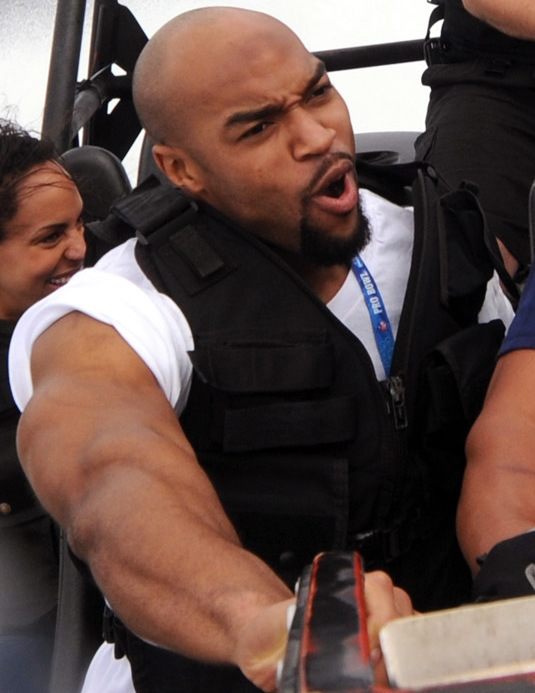
Chris Hope

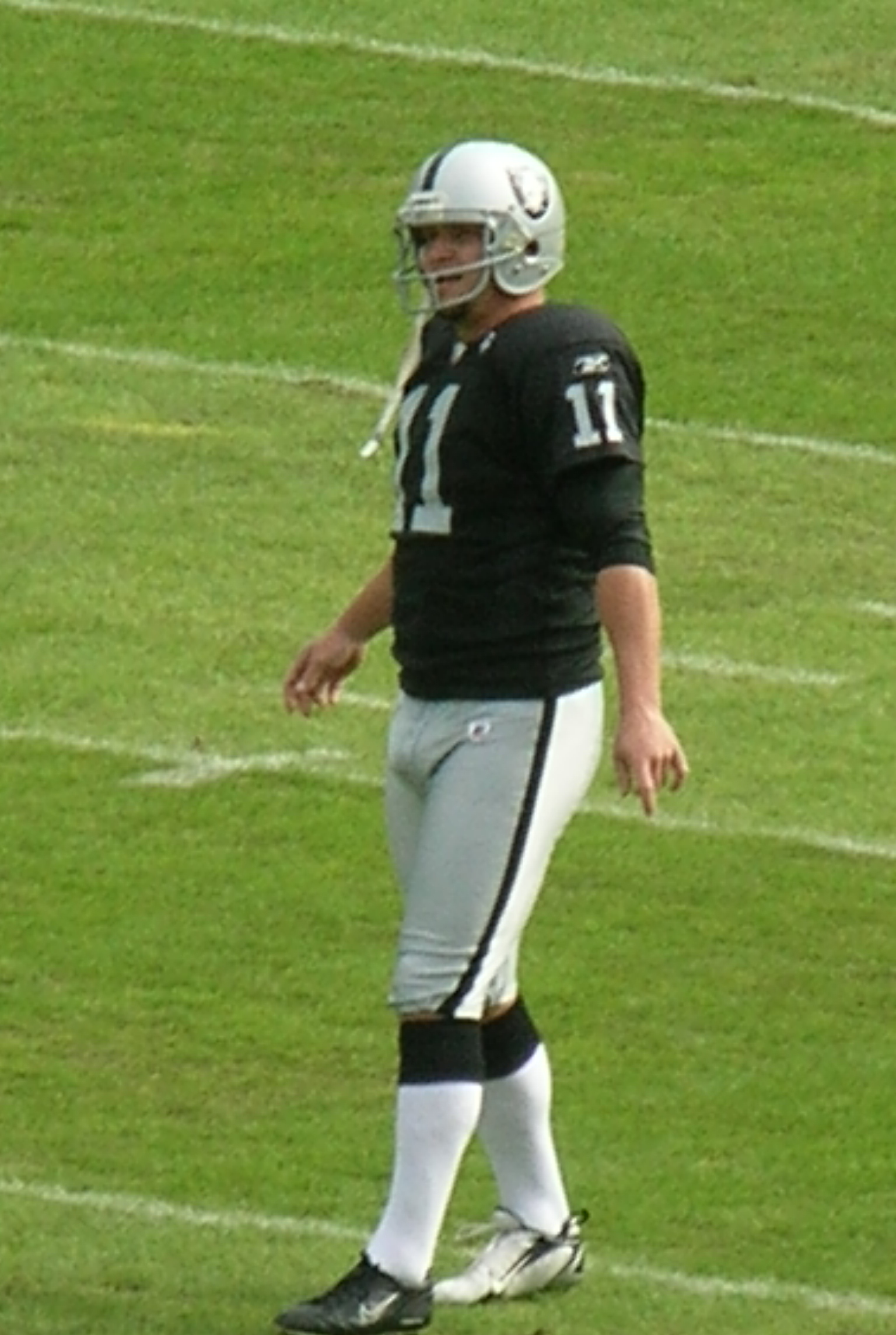
Sebastian Janikowski

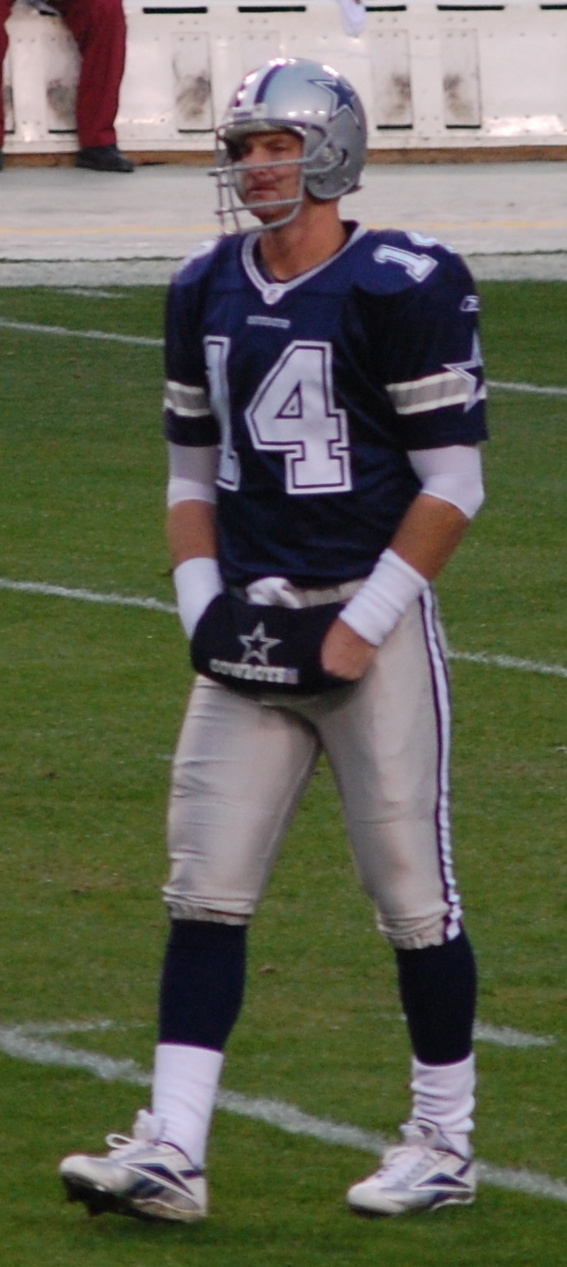
Brad Johnson

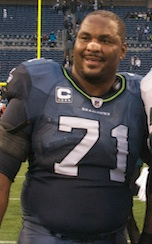
Walter Jones

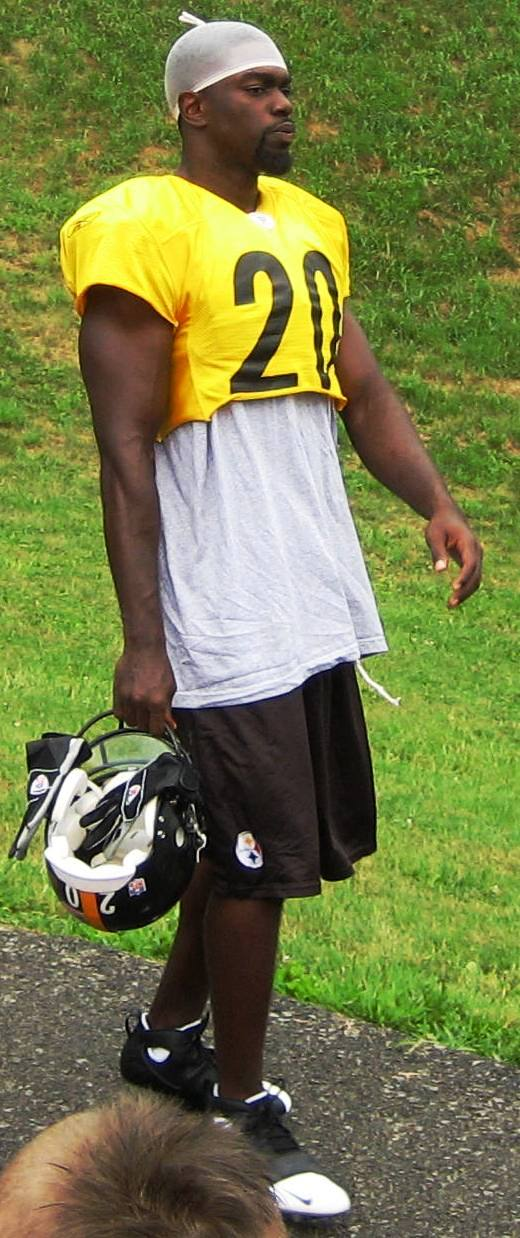
Bryant McFadden

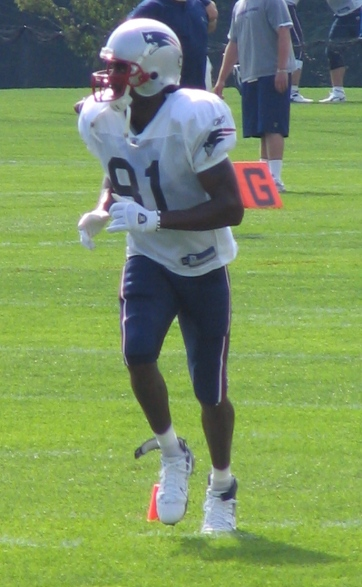
Randy Moss

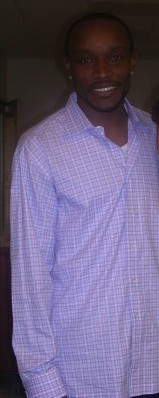
Samari Rolle

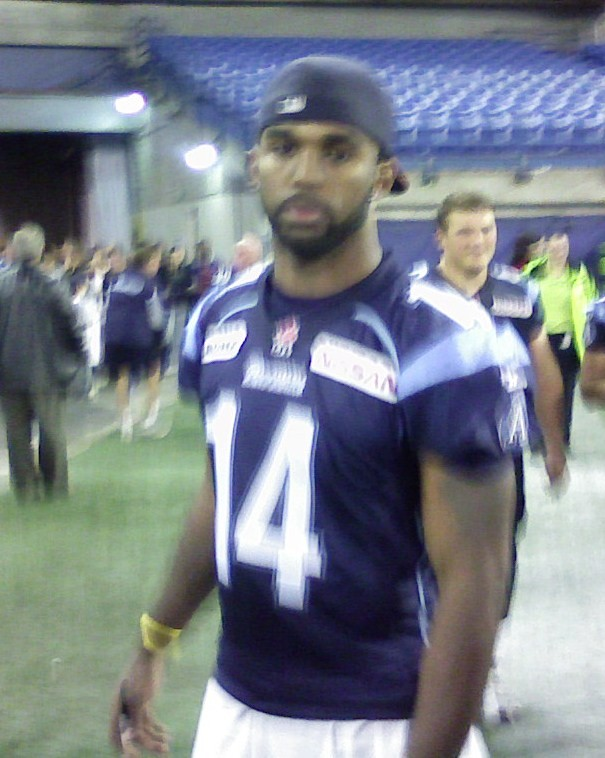
P. K. Sam

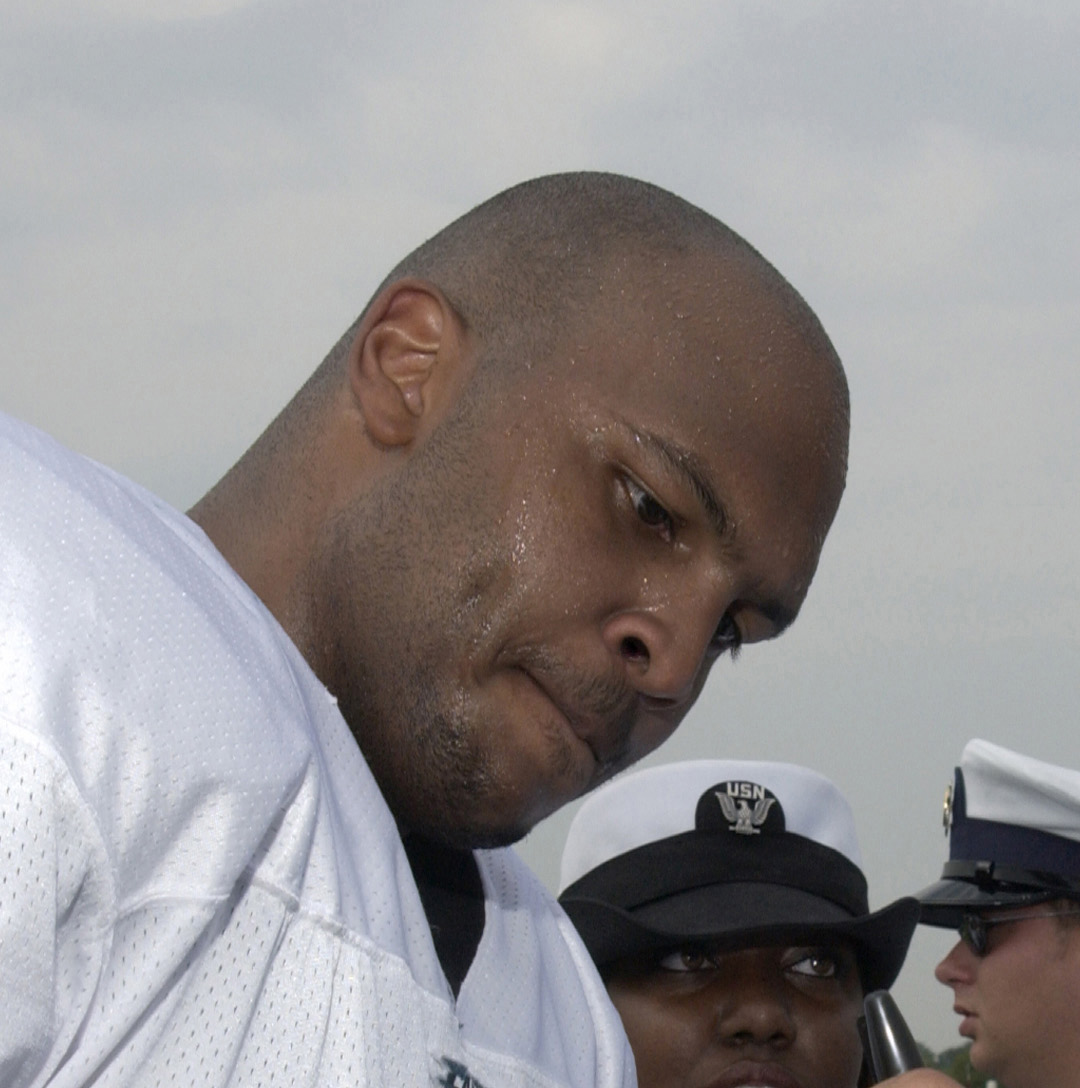
Corey Simon

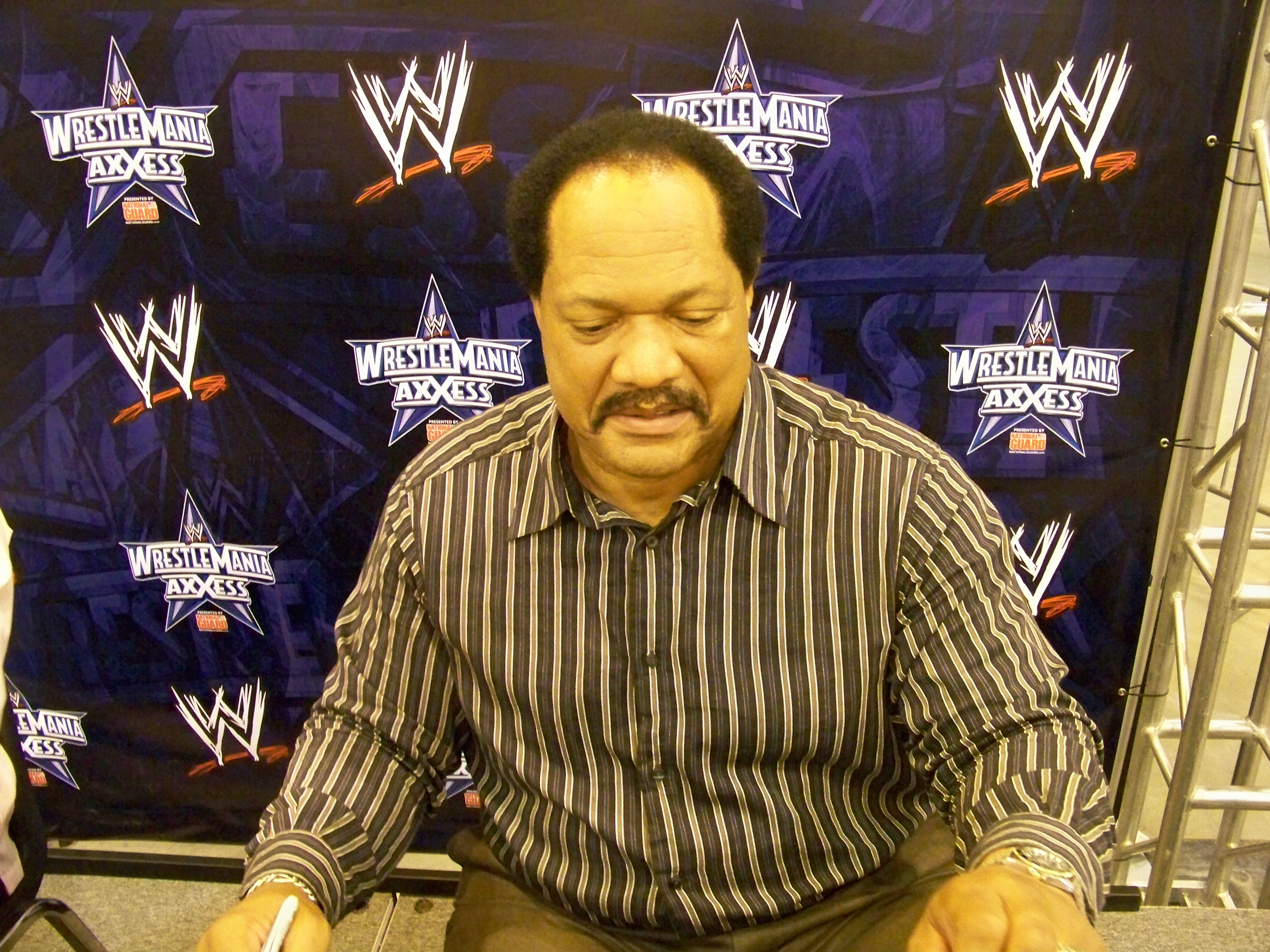
Ron Simmons

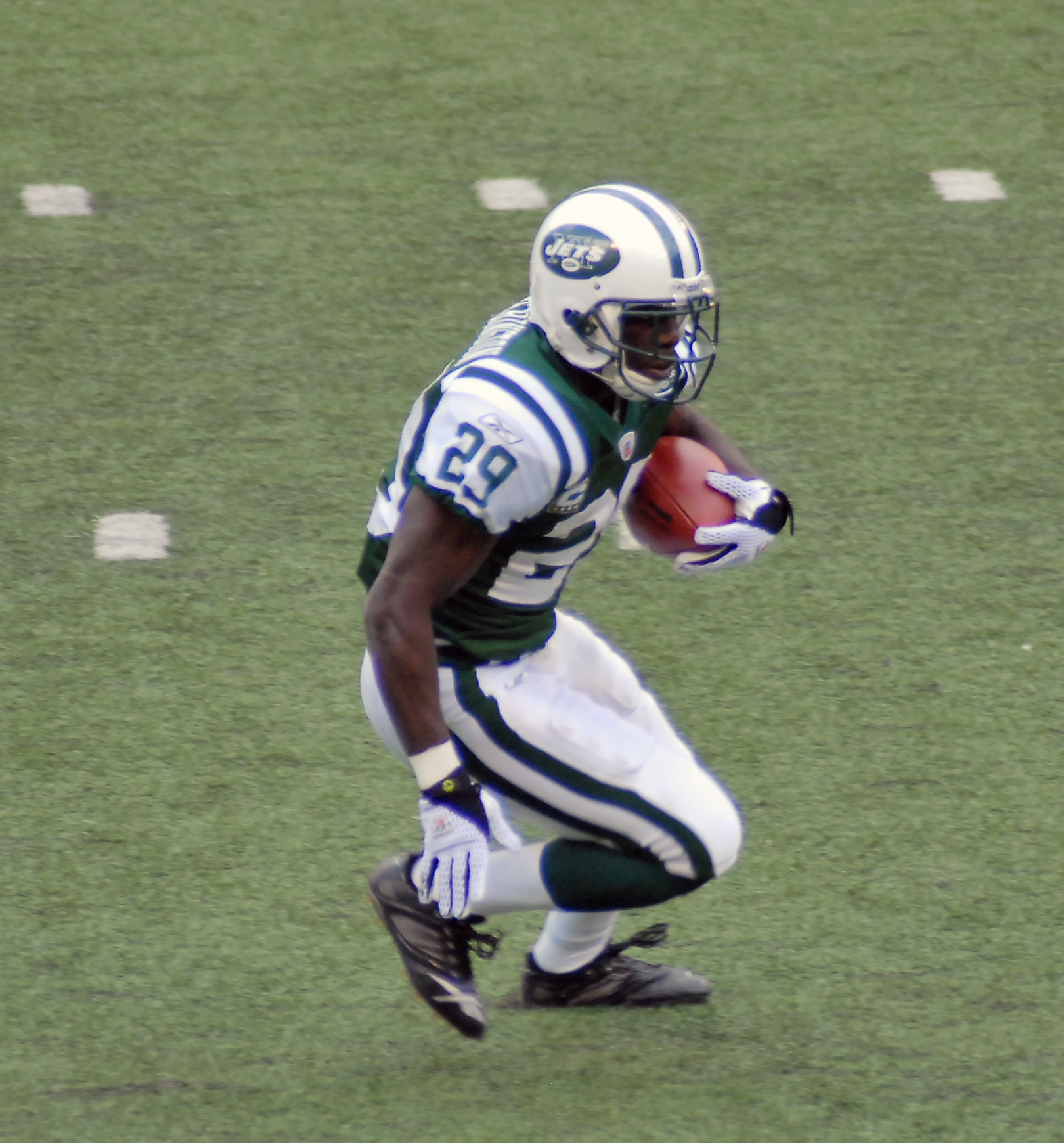
Leon Washington

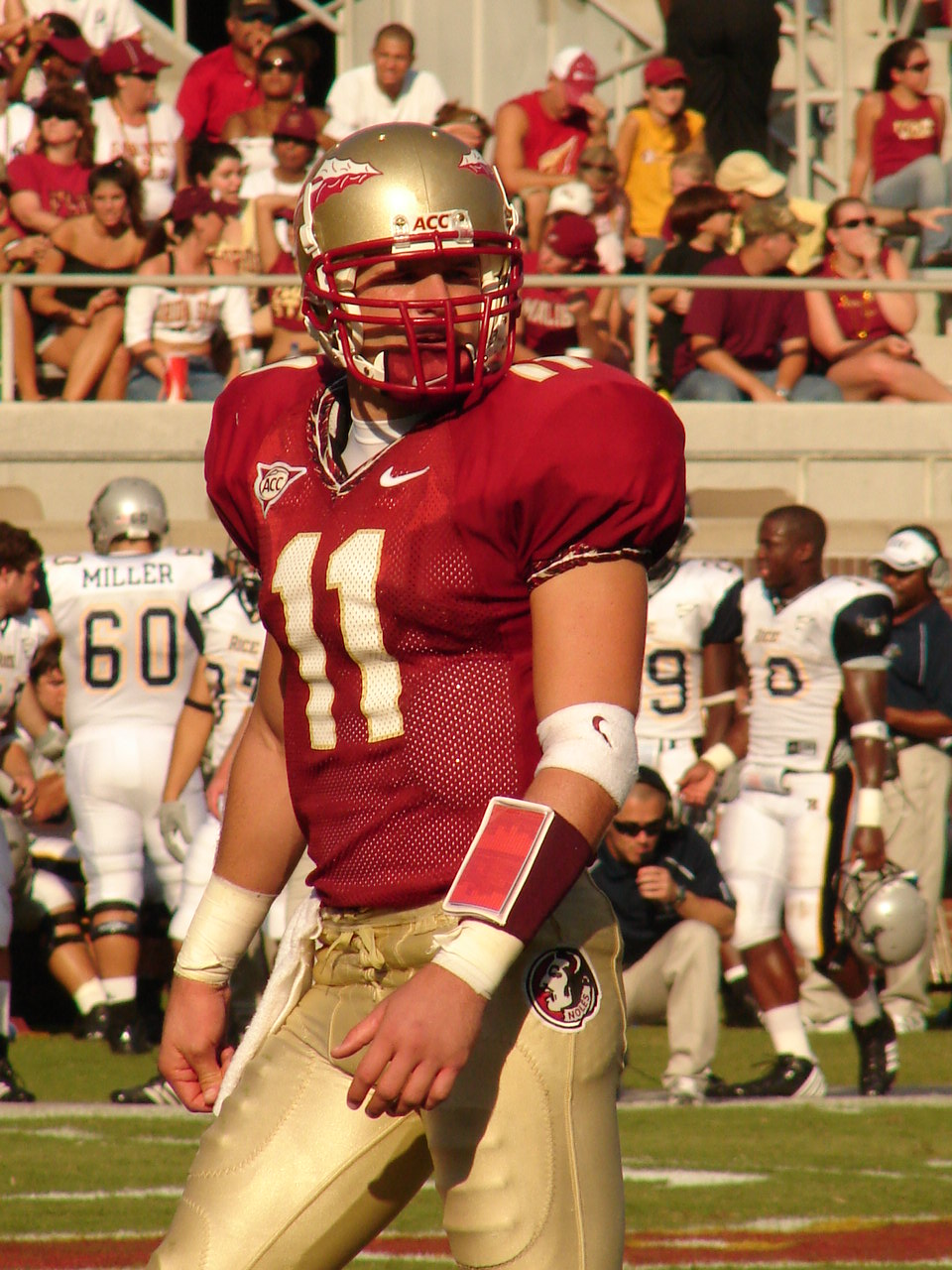
Drew Weatherford

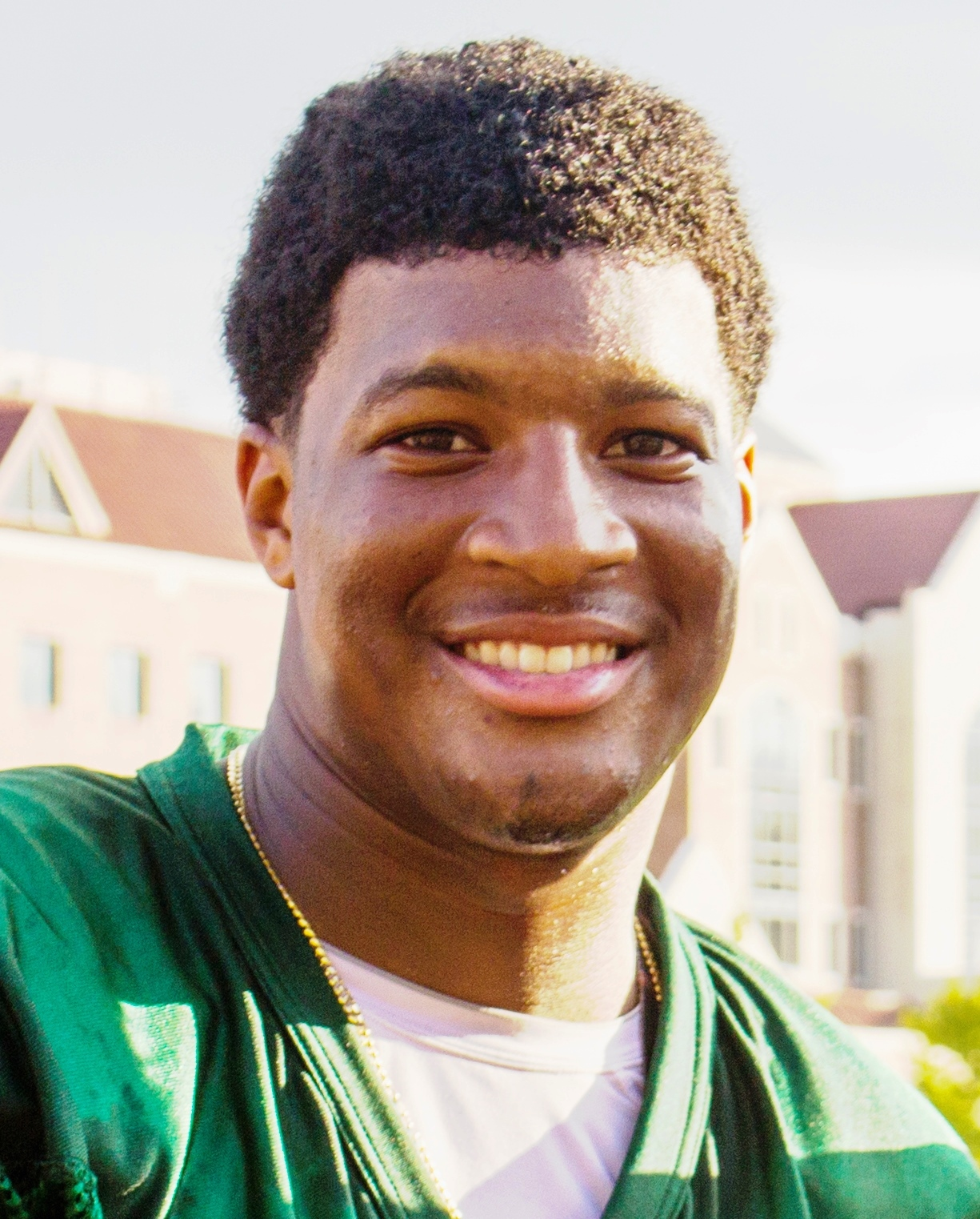
Jameis Winston

Athlete	Notability
Clifton Abraham	professional NFL football player
Cam Akers	professional NFL football player, LA Rams, Minnesota Vikings
Derrick Alexander	professional NFL football player
Brian Allen	professional NFL football player
Joe Avezzano	professional NFL football player, former head coach for Oregon State University
Alex Barron	professional NFL football player
Ed Beckman	professional NFL football player
Edgar Bennett	professional NFL football player
Scott Bentley	professional NFL football player
Fred Biletnikoff	Pro Football Hall of Fame player, Oakland Raiders, Super Bowl XI MVP
Anquan Boldin	professional NFL football player, Baltimore Ravens, 2003 NFL Offensive Rookie of the Year
Lorenzo Booker	professional NFL football player, Minnesota Vikings
Michael Boulware	professional NFL football player
Peter Boulware	professional NFL football player, 1997 NFL Defensive Rookie of the Year, Baltimore Ravens' Ring of Honor
Nigel Bradham	professional NFL football player, Buffalo Bills
Leon Bright	professional NFL football player
Derrick Brooks	professional NFL football player, Tampa Bay Buccaneers, NFL Defensive Player of the Year (2002), 2006 Pro Bowl MVP, 2014 Pro Football Hall of Fame inductee
Everette Brown	professional NFL football player, San Diego Chargers
Mack Brown	Currently Head Football Coach, North Carolina Tar Heels
Milford Brown	professional NFL football player
Rufus Brown	professional NFL football player
Tony Bryant	professional NFL football player
Terrell Buckley	professional NFL football player
Brodrick Bunkley	professional NFL football player, Denver Broncos
Devin Bush	professional NFL football player
Bobby Butler	professional NFL football player
LeRoy Butler	Pro Football Hall of Fame player, invented the "Lambeau Leap"
Brian Burns	professional NFL football player, Carolina Panthers
Marion Butts	professional NFL football player
Bill Capece	professional NFL football player
Alphonso Carreker	professional NFL football player
Dexter Carter	professional NFL football player
Jerome Carter	professional NFL football player
Pat Carter	professional NFL football player
Tony Carter	professional NFL football player, Denver Broncos
Thomas Clayton	professional NFL football player
Tay Cody	professional NFL football player
Randy Coffield	professional NFL football player
Laveranues Coles	professional NFL football player
Dalvin Cook	professional NFL football player
Lee Corso	former University of Louisville and Indiana University head coach, sports broadcaster, ESPN Gameday
Sam Cowart	professional NFL football player
Henri Crockett	professional NFL football player
Zack Crockett	professional NFL football player, Oakland Raiders
Antonio Cromartie	professional NFL football player, New York Jets
Devard Darling	professional NFL football player
Buster Davis	professional NFL football player
Chauncey Davis	professional NFL football player, Chicago Bears
Chris Davis	professional NFL football player
Lawrence Dawsey	professional NFL football player, current FSU WR coach
Manny Diaz	current defensive coordinator, Texas Longhorns
Darnell Dockett	professional NFL football player, Arizona Cardinals
Ron Dugans	professional NFL football player
Jamie Dukes	professional NFL football player, analyst for the NFL Network
Warrick Dunn	professional NFL football player, Tampa Bay Buccaneers, 1997 NFL Offensive Rookie of the Year
Mario Edwards	professional NFL football player, Seattle Seahawks
William Floyd	professional NFL football player, San Francisco, current radio color analyst for FSU Football
Andre Fluellen	professional NFL football player, Detroit Lions
Todd Fordham	professional NFL football player
Devonta Freeman	professional NFL football player, Atlanta Falcons
Corey Fuller	professional NFL football player
Steve Gabbard	professional NFL football player
Graham Gano	professional NFL football player, Washington Redskins, New York Giants
Talman Gardner	professional NFL football player
Kent Gaydos	professional NFL football player
Derrick Gibson	professional NFL football player
E. G. Green	professional NFL football player
Letroy Guion	professional NFL football player, Minnesota Vikings
Kim Hammond	professional NFL football player
Geno Hayes	professional NFL football player, Tampa Bay Buccaneers
Mario Henderson	professional NFL football player
Jessie Hester	professional NFL football player
Montrae Holland	professional NFL football player, Dallas Cowboys
Chris Hope	professional NFL football player, Tennessee Titans
Dustin Hopkins	professional NFL football player, Cleveland Browns
Rodney Hudson	professional NFL football player, Kansas City Chiefs
Gary Huff	professional NFL football player, Chicago Bears, Tampa Bay Buccaneers, current associate athletic director at FSU
Paul Irons	professional NFL football player
Bobby Jackson	professional NFL football player
Dexter Jackson	professional NFL football player, Super Bowl XXXVII MVP for the Tampa Bay Buccaneers
Derwin James	professional NFL football player, Los Angeles Chargers
Sebastian Janikowski	professional NFL football player, Oakland Raiders
Garth Jax	professional NFL football player
Michael Jennings	professional NFL football player
Brad Johnson	professional NFL football player, Dallas Cowboys
Travis Johnson	professional NFL football player
Greg Jones	professional NFL football player, Jacksonville Jaguars
Hassan Jones	professional NFL football player
Marvin Jones	professional NFL football player
Walter Jones	Pro Football Hall of player, Seattle Seahawks
Lamarcus Joyner	professional NFL football player, LA Rams, New York Jets
Danny Kanell	professional NFL football player, college football analyst for ESPN
Kevin Knox	professional NFL football player
Ken Lanier	professional NFL football player
Amp Lee	professional NFL football player, Green Bay Packers
Kevin Long	professional NFL football player
Jim Mankins	professional NFL football player
EJ Manuel	professional NFL football player
Martin Mayhew	professional NFL football player
Bryant McFadden	professional NFL football player
Scott McLean	professional NFL football player
Dennis McKinnon	professional NFL football player, Chicago Bears
Mike Mercer	professional NFL football player
Marvin Minnis	professional NFL football player
Travis Minor	professional NFL football player
Orson Mobley	professional NFL football player
Eric Moore	professional NFL football player
Randy Moss	professional NFL football player (attended for one year and then released from team)
Zeke Mowatt	professional NFL football player
Lee Nelson	professional NFL football player
Sterling Palmer	professional NFL football player
Preston Parker	professional NFL football player, Tampa Bay Buccaneers
Julian Pittman	professional NFL football player
Tommy Polley	professional NFL football player
Christian Ponder	professional NFL football player, Minnesota Vikings
Eric Powell	professional NFL football player
Jalen Ramsey	professional NFL football player, Jacksonville Jaguars
Willie Reid	professional NFL football player
Burt Reynolds	actor and star Seminole tailback
Jamal Reynolds	professional NFL football player
Patrick Robinson	professional NFL football player, New Orleans Saints
Myron Rolle	professional NFL football player, Pittsburgh Steelers, 2009 Rhodes Scholarship recipient
Samari Rolle	professional NFL football player
Gerard Ross	professional NFL football player
P. K. Sam	professional NFL football player
Garrison Sanborn	professional NFL football player, Buffalo Bills
Deion Sanders	Pro Football Hall of Fame player, NFL Defensive Player of the Year (1994), current head of Colorado Buffaloes, former head coach of Jackson State
Zebrie Sanders	professional NFL football player, Buffalo Bills
Ron Sellers	professional NFL football player
Eric Shelton	professional NFL football player
Clay Shiver	professional NFL football player
Ron Simmons	professional USFL football player, former world champion in professional wrestling as both an individual (WCW) and as part of a tag team (WCW and WWE)
Corey Simon	professional NFL football player
Carl Simpson	professional NFL football player
Ernie Sims	professional NFL football player, Indianapolis Colts
Antone Smith	professional NFL football player, Atlanta Falcons
Barry Smith	professional NFL football player
Sammie Smith	professional NFL football player
Jesse Solomon	professional NFL football player
Greg Spires	professional NFL football player
Rohn Stark	professional NFL football player
Walt Sumner	professional NFL football player
Josh Sweat	professional NFL football player, Philadelphia Eagles
Tra Thomas	professional NFL football player
William Thomas	professional NFL football player
Weegie Thompson	professional NFL football player
Craphonso Thorpe	professional NFL football player
Lawrence Timmons	professional NFL football player, Pittsburgh Steelers
Rick Tuten	professional NFL football player
Tamarick Vanover	professional NFL and CFL football player, current Lake City Christian High School coach
Andre Wadsworth	professional NFL football player
DeMarcus Walker	professional NFL football player, Denver Broncos
Javon Walker	professional NFL football player
B. J. Ward	professional NFL football player
Charlie Ward	Heisman Trophy winner, professional NBA basketball player
Peter Warrick	professional NFL football player
Leon Washington	professional NFL football player, New York Jets
Pat Watkins	professional NFL football player
Dekoda Watson	professional NFL football player, Tampa Bay Buccaneers
Drew Weatherford	professional NFL football player
Chris Weinke	Heisman Trophy winner, professional NFL football player
Björn Werner	professional NFL football player
T. K. Wetherell	former State of Florida representative, former speaker of the House for Florida, former president of Florida State University
Markus White	professional NFL football player, Washington Redskins
Bud Whitehead	professional NFL football player
Brett Williams	professional NFL football player
Todd Williams	professional NFL football player
Peter Tom Willis	professional NFL football player, former FSU football radio analyst
Ray Willis	professional NFL football player
Reinard Wilson	professional NFL football player
Kamerion Wimbley	professional NFL football player, Oakland Raiders
Jameis Winston	Heisman Trophy winner, professional NFL football player

=== Heisman Trophy winners ===
Alumni	Notability	Reference
Charlie Ward	1993 Heisman Trophy winner	
Chris Weinke	2000 Heisman Trophy winner	
Jameis Winston	2013 Heisman Trophy winner	

== Baseball ==
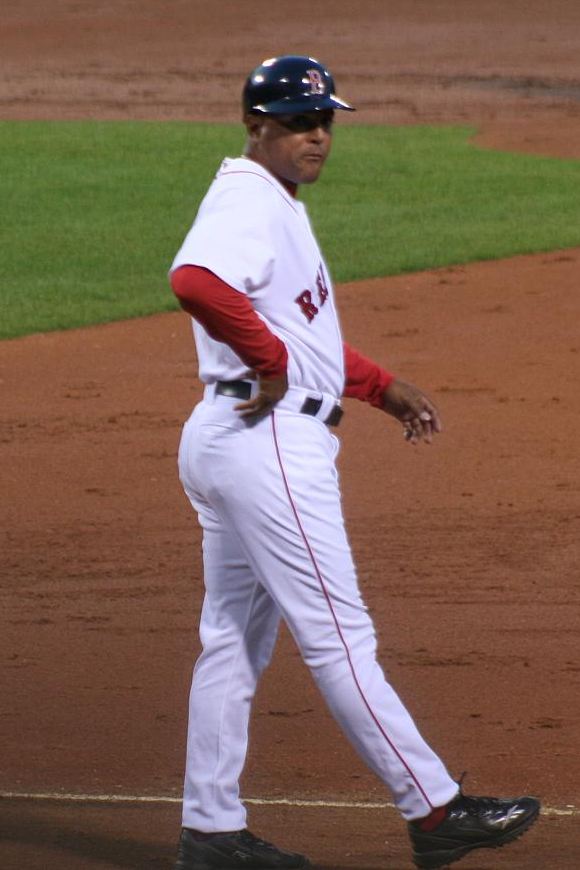
Luis Alicea

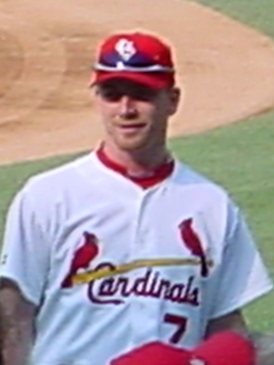
J. D. Drew

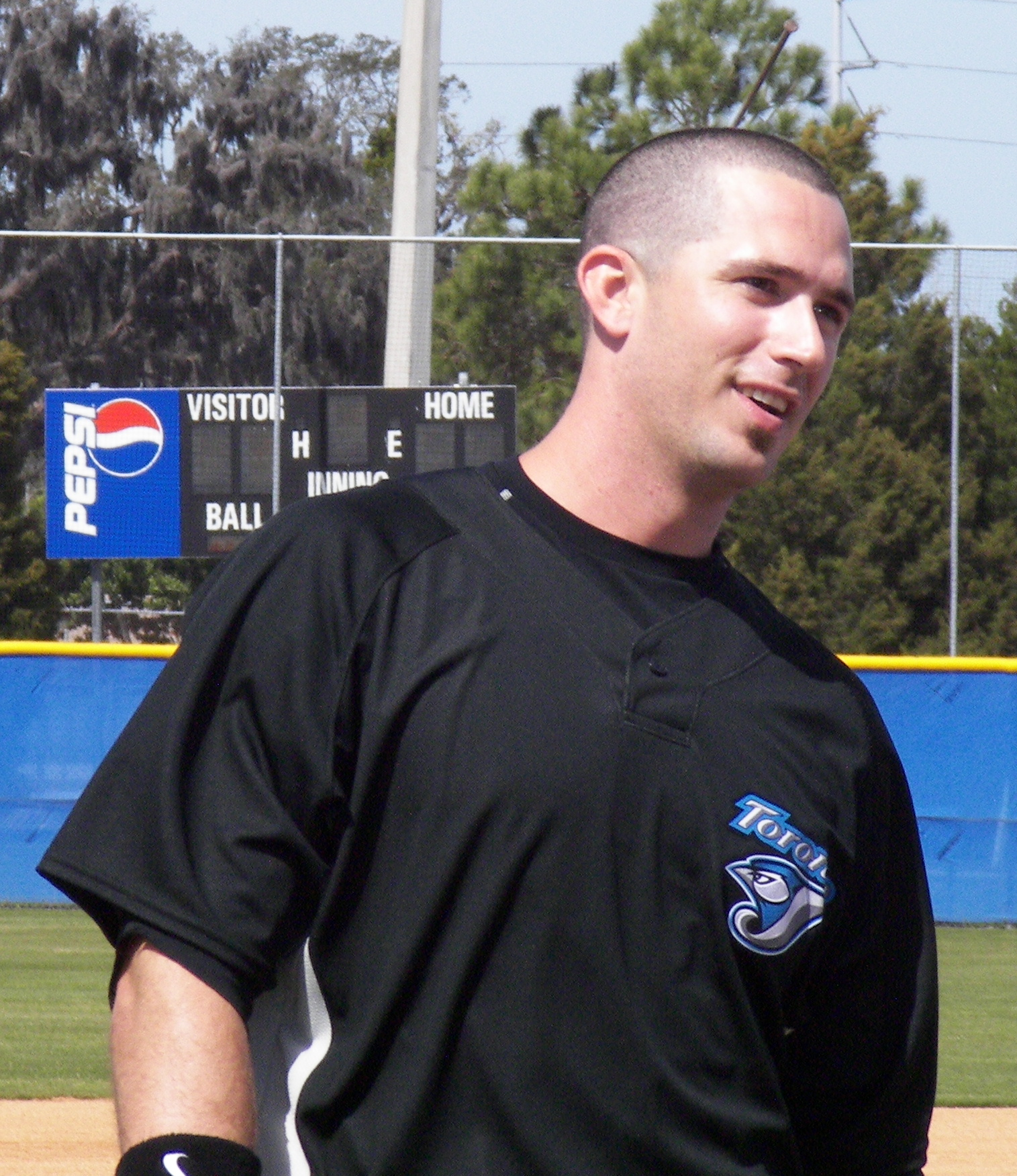
John-Ford Griffin

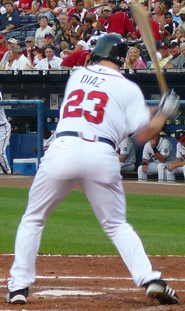
Matt Diaz

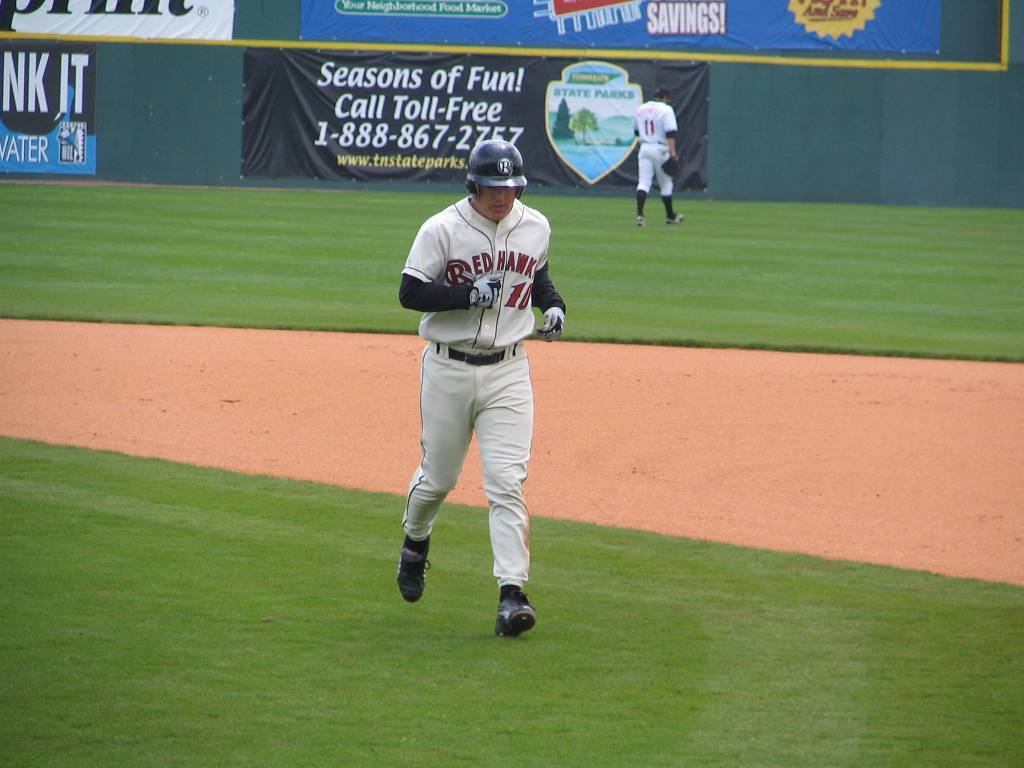
Marshall McDougall

Athlete	Notability	Reference
Luis Alicea	professional MLB baseball player	
Gene Ammann	professional baseball player in Japan	
Dick Brown	professional MLB baseball player	
Barret Browning	professional MLB baseball player, St. Louis Cardinals	
Daz Cameron	professional MLB baseball player, Detroit Tigers	
George Cappuzzello	professional MLB baseball player, Detroit Tigers	
Kevin Cash	professional MLB baseball player, Boston Red Sox	
Randy Choate	professional MLB baseball player, Tampa Bay Rays	
Daniel Davidson	professional MLB baseball player, Anaheim Angels	
Matt Diaz	professional MLB baseball player, Atlanta Braves	
J. D. Drew	professional MLB baseball player, Boston Red Sox	
Stephen Drew	professional MLB baseball player, Arizona Diamondbacks	
Gar Finnvold	professional MLB baseball player, Boston Red Sox	
Ron Fraser	former college baseball coach at the University of Miami 1963–1992; on the College World Series in 1982 and 1985	
Mike Fuentes	professional MLB baseball player, Montreal Expos	
Mark Gilbert	professional MLB baseball player, United States Ambassador to New Zealand	
Sean Gilmartin	professional MLB baseball player, New York Mets	
Jeff Gray	professional MLB baseball player	
John-Ford Griffin	professional MLB baseball player, Toronto Blue Jays	
Johnny Grubb	professional MLB baseball player	
Tyler Holt	professional MLB baseball player	
Dick Howser	professional MLB baseball player	
Hunter Jones	professional MLB baseball player	
Terry Kennedy	professional MLB baseball player	
Tony La Russa	former MLB manager, Chicago White Sox, Oakland A's, St. Louis Cardinals	
Richie Lewis	professional MLB baseball player	
Mickey Lopez	professional MLB baseball player	
Mike Loynd	professional MLB baseball player	
Jim Lyttle	professional MLB baseball player	
Mike Martin	head coach, Florida State Seminoles	
Marshall McDougall	professional MLB baseball player, Texas Rangers record holder for most home runs in a college game (6)	
Doug Mientkiewicz	former professional MLB baseball player and Olympic gold medalist at the 2000 Summer Olympics; Minnesota Twins, Boston Red Sox, New York Mets, Kansas City Royals, New York Yankees, Pittsburgh Pirates, Los Angeles Dodgers	
Eduardo Pérez	professional MLB baseball player, now analyst for ESPN's Baseball Tonight	
Buster Posey	professional MLB baseball player, San Francisco Giants	
Scott Proctor	professional MLB baseball player, Los Angeles Dodgers	
Cal Raleigh	professional MLB baseball player, Seattle Mariners	
James Ramsey	professional MLB baseball player	
Jody Reed	professional MLB baseball player	
Shane Robinson	professional MLB baseball player	
Deion Sanders	former MLB baseball player (played in the NFL)	
Mac Scarce	professional MLB baseball player	
Paul Sorrento	professional MLB baseball player	
Ken Suarez	professional MLB baseball player	
Jeff Tam	professional MLB baseball player	
Devon Travis	professional MLB baseball player, Toronto Blue Jays	
John Wasdin	professional MLB baseball player, Texas Rangers	
Paul Wilson	professional MLB baseball player, Cincinnati Reds	

== Basketball (men's) ==
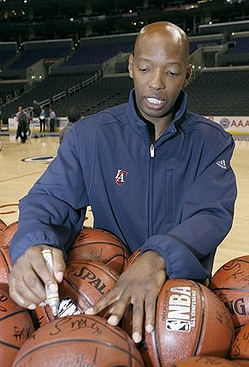
Sam Cassell

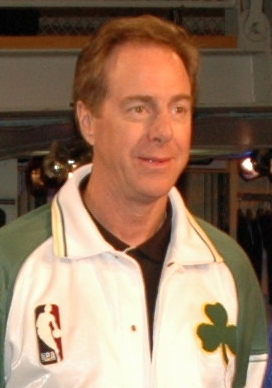
Dave Cowens

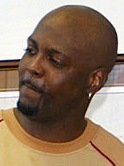
George McCloud

Athlete	Notability	Reference
Solomon Alabi	professional NBA basketball player, Toronto Raptors	
Randy Allen	professional NBA basketball player	
Dwayne Bacon	professional NBA basketball player, Charlotte Hornets	
Scottie Barnes	professional NBA basketball player, Toronto Raptors	
Malik Beasley	professional NBA basketball player, Denver Nuggets	
Sam Cassell	professional NBA basketball player	
Ben Clyde	professional NBA basketball player	
James Collins	professional NBA basketball player	
Dave Cowens	professional NBA basketball player, Boston Celtics, Milwaukee Bucks (retired); named to NBA's 50 Greatest of All Time list	
Tony Dawson	professional NBA basketball player	
Mickey Dillard	professional NBA basketball player	
Toney Douglas	professional NBA basketball player, Houston Rockets	
Deividas Dulkys	represented Lithuania at the 2012 Summer Olympics	
Hugh Durham	former head basketball coach for Florida State University and the University of Georgia	
Doug Edwards	professional NBA basketball player	
Jonathan Isaac	professional NBA basketball player, Orlando Magic	
Bernard James	professional NBA basketball player, Dallas Mavericks	
Alexander Johnson	professional NBA basketball player, Miami Heat	
Michael Joiner	professional basketball player in the Australian National Basketball League	
Jonathan Kerner	professional NBA basketball player	
Derwin Kitchen	basketball player for Ironi Nahariya of the Israeli Basketball Premier League	
Terance Mann	professional NBA basketball player, Los Angeles Clippers	
George McCloud	professional NBA basketball player	
Ralph Mims	professional basketball player in Europe	
Tim Pickett	professional NBA basketball player	
Xavier Rathan-Mayes	professional basketball player	
Ryan Reid	professional NBA basketball player	
Chris Singleton	professional NBA basketball player, Washington Wizards	
Michael Snaer	professional basketball player	
Bob Sura	professional NBA basketball player, Houston Rockets	
Irving Thomas	professional NBA basketball player	
Al Thornton	professional NBA basketball player, Washington Wizards	
Devin Vassell	professional NBA basketball player, San Antonio Spurs	
Von Wafer	professional NBA basketball player, Boston Celtics	
M. J. Walker	basketball player in the Israeli Basketball Premier League and NBA	
Charlie Ward	professional NBA basketball player, Heisman Trophy winner	
Mitchell Wiggins	professional NBA basketball player	
Patrick Williams	professional NBA basketball player, Chicago Bulls	
Willie Williams	professional NBA basketball player	
Ed Young	played two years, now pastor of Fellowship Church	

== Basketball (women's) ==
Athlete	Notability	Reference
Tanae Davis-Cain	professional WNBA basketball player, Detroit Shock	
Sue Galkantas	1983 finalist for the Wade Trophy	
Roneeka Hodges	professional WNBA basketball player, Houston Comets	
Natasha Howard	professional WNBA basketball player, Indiana Fever	
Britany Miller	professional WNBA basketball player, Detroit Shock	
Jacinta Monroe	professional WNBA basketball player, Washington Mystics and Tulsa Shock	
Tia Paschal	professional WNBA basketball player, Chicago Sting	
Leonor Rodríguez	professional basketball player and member of the Spain national team; Olympic silver medalist, Rio 2016 Summer Olympics	
Leticia Romero	basketball player for the Spain women's national basketball team; Olympic silver medalist, Rio 2016 Summer Olympics	
Brooke Wyckoff	professional WNBA basketball player, Chicago Sky	

== Golf ==
=== PGA ===
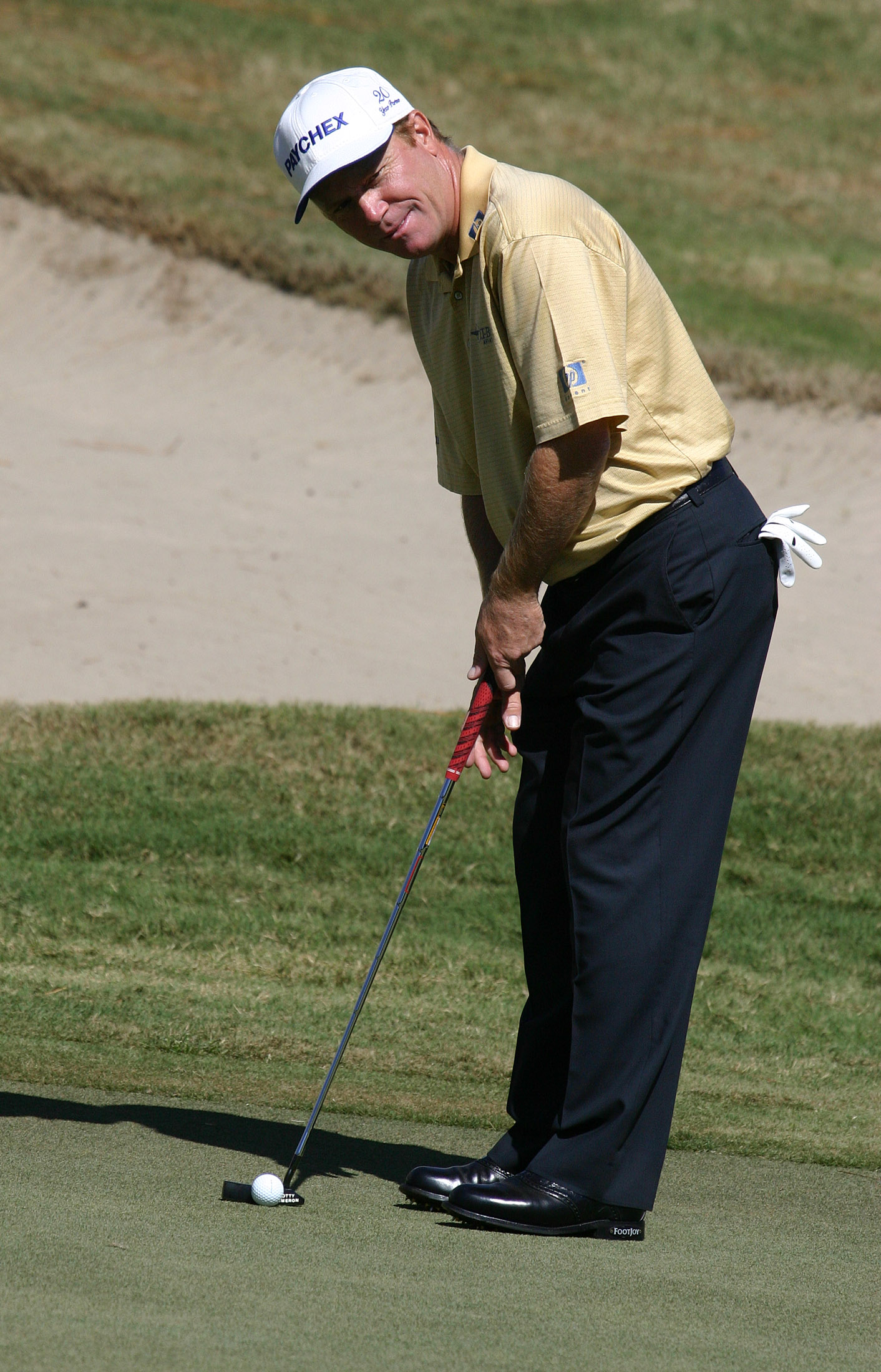
Jeff Sluman

Athlete	Notability	Reference
Paul Azinger	professional golfer	
Daniel Berger	professional golfer	
Jonas Blixt	professional golfer	
Bob Duval	professional golfer	
Harry Ellis	professional golfer	
Hubert Green	professional golfer	
Nolan Henke	professional golfer	
Brian Kamm	professional golfer	
Richie Karl	professional golfer	
Kenny Knox	professional golfer	
Brooks Koepka	professional golfer	
Hank Lebioda	professional golfer	
Jack Maguire	professional golfer	
George McNeill	professional golfer	
Jeremy Robinson	professional golfer	
Jeff Sluman	professional golfer	

=== LPGA ===
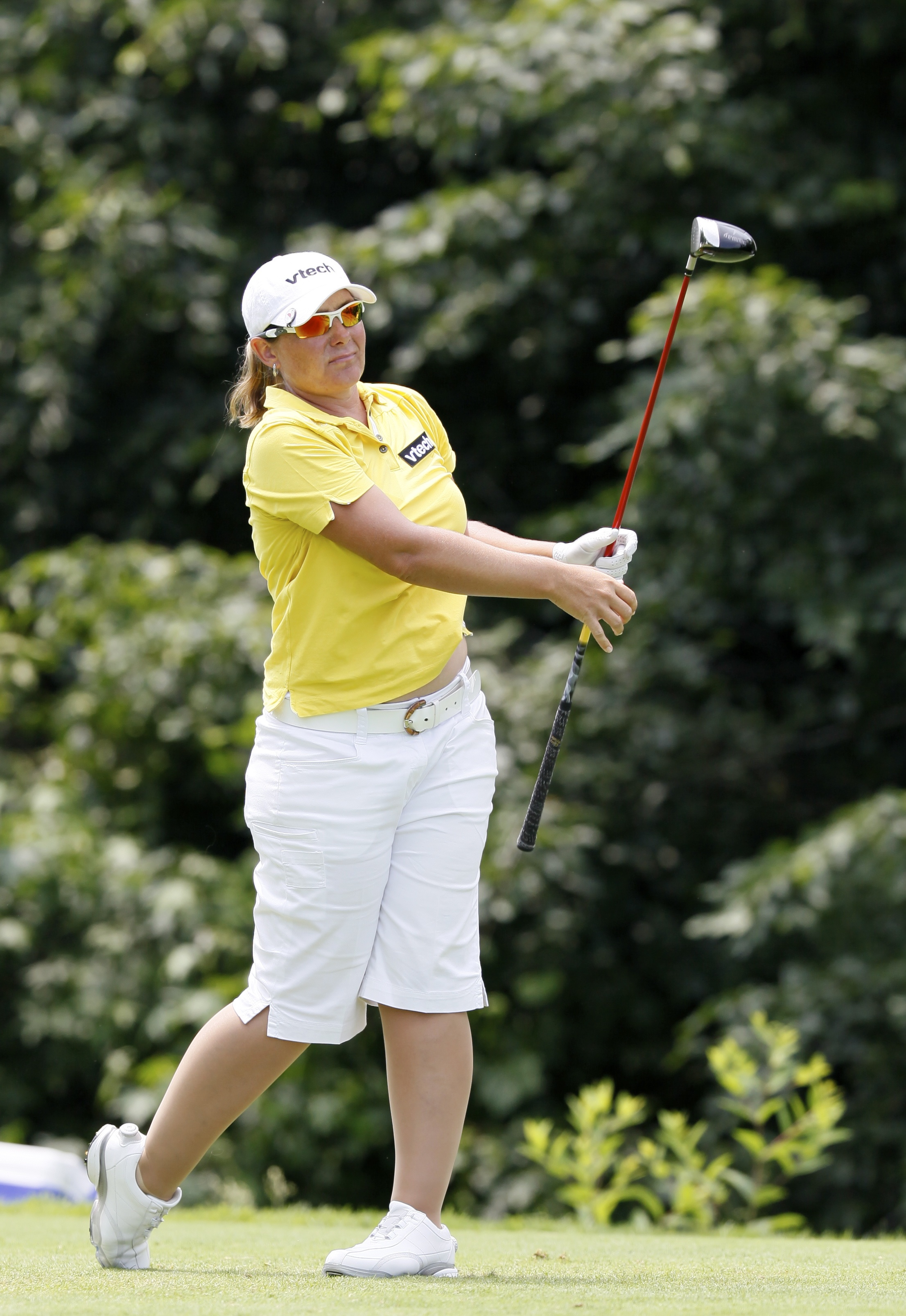
Karen Stupples

Athlete	Notability	Reference
Barb Bunkowsky	professional golfer	
Jane Geddes	professional golfer	
Leigh Ann Mills	professional golfer	
Nancy Scranton	professional golfer	
Karen Stupples	professional golfer	
Colleen Walker	professional golfer	
Lisa Walters	professional golfer	

== Gymnastics ==
Athlete	Notability	Reference

== Soccer ==
Athlete	Notability	Reference
Dagný Brynjarsdóttir	Icelandic professional soccer player, Bayern Munich	
Deyna Castellanos	Venezuelan women's soccer player, winner of the Golden Boot of the 2014 FIFA U-17 Women's World Cup	
Megan Connolly	soccer player for the Republic of Ireland women's national football team	
Becky Edwards	professional soccer player	
Yekaterina Gokhman	professional soccer player, Anderlecht, Belgium, Russia women's national soccer team	
Michaela Hahn	professional soccer player	
Selin Kuralay	2004 Olympic Games – Australia	
Cheyna Matthews	professional soccer player, Washington Spirit	
Carson Pickett	professional soccer player	
Toni Pressley	professional soccer player, Orlando Pride	
Casey Short	professional soccer player, Chicago Red Stars, United States women's national soccer team	
India Trotter	professional soccer player	
Gloriana Villalobos	Costa Rican women's soccer player	
Sarah Wagenfuhr	professional soccer player	
Mami Yamaguchi	Japanese professional soccer player	

== Softball ==
Athlete	Notability	Reference
Yuruby Alicart	competed for Venezuela in 2008 Summer Olympics	
Jessica Burroughs	two-time ACC Pitcher of the Year and a 2017 first-team All-American	
Darby Cottle	two-time All-American softball player	
Lacey Waldrop	2014 College Softball National Player of the Year	
Jessie Warren	2018 Women's College World Series Most Outstanding Player	

== Swimming and diving ==
Athlete	Notability	Reference
Phil Boggs	diver and Olympic gold medalist, 1976 Summer Olympics	
Robert Braknis	participated in the 1996 Summer Olympics	
Molly Carlson	Canadian diver who, after competing at FSU, transitioned to high diving and competed in the Red Bull Cliff Diving World Series	
Mateo de Angulo	represented Colombia in the 2012 Summer Olympics	
Wendy Fuller	participated in the 1988 Summer Olympics	
Patrick Jeffrey	participated in the 1996 Summer Olympics	
Mike Kowalski	participated in the 1988 Summer Olympics	
Nelson Mora	butterfly swimmer from Venezuela	
Steve Parry	butterfly and backstroke swimmer, Olympic bronze medalist, 2004 Summer Olympics	
Katherine Rawls	diver, two-time Olympic silver medalist, 1932 Summer Olympics and 1936 Summer Olympics	
Ariel Rittenhouse	diver who participated in the 2008 Summer Olympics	
Pavel Sankovich	swimmer from Belarus who participated in the 2008, 2012, and 2016 Summer Olympics	
Julio Santos	freestyle swimmer from Ecuador	
Tal Stricker	breaststroke swimmer, competed for Israel in 2000 Summer Olympics	
Chris Vythoulkas	participated in the 2004 Summer Olympics for the Bahamas	
Katrina Young	10m dive who participated in the 2016 Summer Olympics	

== Tennis ==
Athlete	Notability	Reference
Réjean Génois	professional tennis player	
Paul Haarhuis	professional tennis player, participated in the Olympics	
Richard Legendre	professional tennis player	
Joey Rive	professional tennis player	
Maciek Sykut	professional tennis player	

== Track and field ==
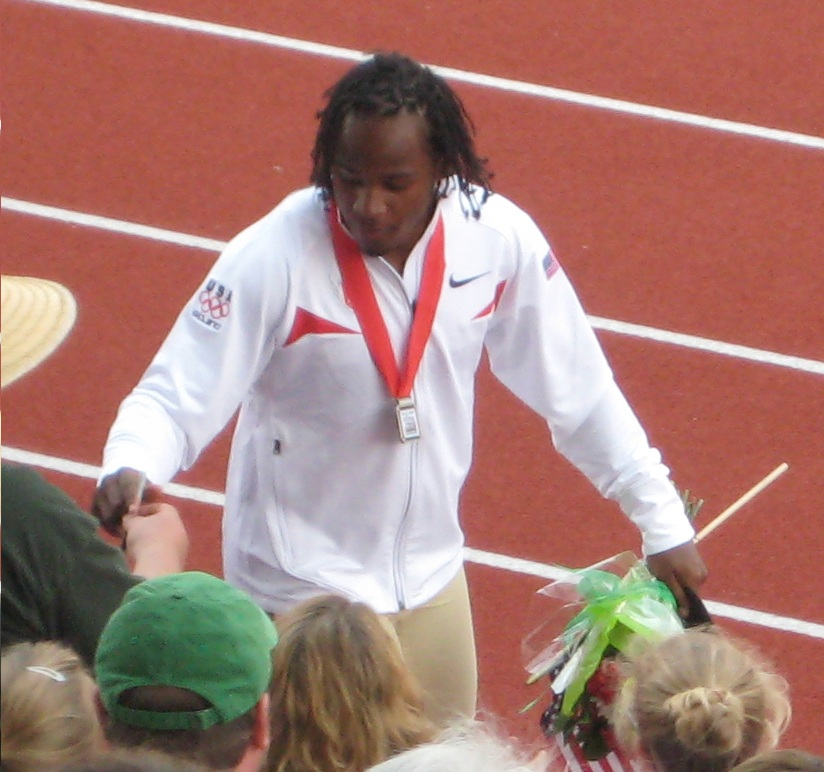
Walter Dix

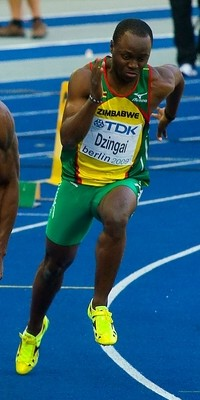
Brian Dzingai

Athlete	Notability	Reference
Gonzalo Barroilhet	Olympic decathlete from Chile	
Kim Batten	long jumper, Olympic silver medalist	
Jonathan Borlée	Belgian sprinter who competed in the 2008 Summer Olympics and 2012 Summer Olympics	
Kevin Borlée	Belgian sprinter who competed in the 2008 Summer Olympics and 2012 Summer Olympics	
Marvin Bracy	sprinter	
Ricardo Chambers	Jamaican 400 m specialist	
Charles Clark	sprinter, three-time NCAA Champion, 4 × 100 m relay, 200m outdoor, and 4 × 400 m relay outdoor	
Bradley Cooper	Olympic discus thrower and shot putter	
Trey Cunningham	hurdler, silver medal, 110 metres hurdles, 2022 World Athletics Championships; sliver medal, 2022 USA Outdoor Track and Field Championship	
Rafeeq Curry	NCAA Champion, 9x NCAA All-American, 2011 USA Indoor Champion, and represented America at the 2008 Summer Olympics	
Walter Dix	won two bronze medals at the 2008 Summer Olympics	
Brian Dzingai	Olympic sprinter from Zimbabwe	
Hannah England	British distance runner, 2012 Summer Olympics	
Michelle Finn	sprinter	
Trentavis Friday	World Junior Champion in the 200m and 4 × 100 m relay	
Randy Givens	track and field sprinter and participant at the 1984 Summer Olympics	
Linden Hall	Australian middle-distance runner, competed at 2016 Summer Olympics	
Kemar Hyman	Caymanian sprinter	
Lacy Janson	pole vaulter at the 2012 Summer Olympics	
Garrett Johnson	shot putter, 2006 NCAA Champion, and Rhodes Scholar	
Thomas Lancashire	represented Great Britain at the 2008 Summer Olympics in the 1500m	
Andrew Lemoncello	Olympic distance runner from Britain	
Ngonidzashe Makusha	Olympic long jumper from Zimbabwe	
Walter McCoy	relay runner, and Olympic gold medalist	
Stephen Newbold	Bahamian sprinter	
Marita Payne	Canadian sprinter, won two silver medals at the 1984 Summer Olympics	
Dorian Scott	Jamaican shot putter, competed at 2012 Summer Olympics	
Adriaan Wildschutt	South African long-distance runner, competed at 2024 Summer Olympics	
Kendal Williams	World Junior Champion in the 100m and 4 × 100 m relay	
Kimberly Williams	Jamaican triple jumper, competed at 2012 Summer Olympics	

== Volleyball ==
Athlete	Notability	Reference
Trenesha Biggers	professional wrestler, model, actress, activist	
Norisha Campbell	professional volleyball player	
Nick Lucena	Olympic volleyball player (2016)	
Karyn Palgut	Olympic handball player (1988, 1992)	
Gabrielle Reece	professional volleyball player, model	

== See also ==
- Atlantic Coast Conference
- Osceola and Renegade
- "FSU Fight Song"
- List of Florida State University people
