= Steve Rochinski =

American jazz musician

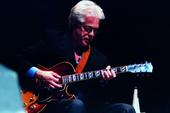

Background information
- Born: January 20, 1954 (age 72); Washington, D.C., U.S.
- Genres: Jazz
- Occupation: Musician/Educator
- Instrument: Guitar
- Years active: 1972–present
- Labels: Jardis, LineOut, Heavy Hitters/Made In Memphis Entertainment (MIME)

Stephen James Rochinski (born January 20, 1954) is an American jazz guitarist, composer, arranger, recording artist, author, and educator(Professor Emeritus)

He has worked and performed with Tal Farlow, Attila Zoller, Jimmy Raney, Pete Candoli, Conte Candoli, Tim Hagans, Joe Lovano, Greg Hopkins, Gary Foster, Pat Harbison, Jeff Sherman, Hal Melia, Chip Stephens, Hank Marr, Brad Goode, Joe Hunt, Scott Lee, Walt Weiskopf, Wade Beach, Amy Shook, Jeff Antoniuk, Tony Martucci, Chuck Redd, Richard Evans, Bob Freedman, entertainer and singer Anthony Tillman, as well as numerous studio, concert, club date, and international clinic appearances.

== Biography ==
Rochinski has received numerous grants and awards including a 1993 Jazz Fellowship from the National Endowment for the Arts for private study with Tal Farlow. In 1984, after leaving the road as the music director, guitarist, and arranger for the Tony Tillman Show, he became a professor at his alma mater, the Berklee College of Music, where, in addition to curriculum development and consulting, he teaches all levels of harmony. He is the author of Harmony 4, (Berklee Press) the last in a series of Berklee's Core harmony curriculum textbooks, Reharmonization Techniques for Berklee Online, and Modern Jazz Theory and Practice—The Post-Bop Era (Berklee Press). He also teaches arranging, ear training, ensembles, and improvisation. He is the author of The Jazz Style of Tal Farlow: The Elements of Bebop Guitar and The Motivic Basis for Jazz Guitar Improvisation (Hal Leonard LLC).

One of the highlights of his performance career was his selection as one of a handful of guitarists to perform at the 1996 JVC Jazz Festival 75th birthday tribute concert for Tal Farlow at Merkin Hall in New York City. He teamed up with Attila Zoller and Andrei Ryabov to perform Zoller's "Homage to O.P.". Other guitarists who appeared at this historic concert event were Johnny Smith, Howard Alden, Herb Ellis, John Abercrombie, Gene Bertoncini, and Sal Salvador, among others.

In 1995, he released his debut album, Until Further Notice, with Grammy-winning arranger/producer Richard Evans. He recorded for Jardis Records, Germany's jazz guitar label. His releases include A Bird in the Hand, Otherwise, Jazz Guitar Highlights Vol. 1, and Something Old, Something New w/ The Boston Studio Jazz Orchestra, under the direction of trumpeter, composer, arranger, and Buddy Rich veteran Greg Hopkins.

In November 2001, he was featured in Just Jazz Guitar (November 2001).

In 2013, Rochinski joined the staff of The Maryland Summer Jazz Camp & Festival in Rockville, Maryland.

In January 2014, Rochinski was honored with Berklee's Distinguished Professor Award. In December of 2024, Rochinski formally retired from Berklee, after 40 years.

Rochinski's music, in affiliation with Heavy Hitters Music, has appeared in productions for Hallmark Channel, Showtime, CBS Television and ABC Television.

Rochinski's memoir titled A Man Of His Time (Secrets From A Halfway World) was published and released in 2020 by Mascot Books. The memoir made the quarter-finalist list for Publishers Weekly 2019 BookLife Prize Nonfiction Contest (rating: 10/10). In June 2021, "A Man Of His Time..." won the CIBA (Chanticleer International Book Awards) 1st Place — Best in Category (Journey) for Narrative Non-Fiction.
