= Goloshchekin =

Goloshchyokin, Goloshchekin, or Goloschekin, feminine: Goloshchyokina, etc. (Russian: Голощёкин, Голощёкина) is a Russian-language surname derived from the nickname Голощёк, literally "a person with bare cheeks". The surname may refer to:

- Filipp Goloshchyokin, Soviet Bolshevik functionary
- David Goloschekin, Russian jazz musician
