= Kirill Kruze =

Russian footballer

Personal information
- Full name: Kirill Valeryevich Kruze
- Date of birth: 13 October 1983 (age 43)
- Place of birth: Artyom, Russian SFSR
- Height: 1.80 m (5 ft 11 in)
- Position: Forward

Youth career
- DYuSSh Artyom
- PFC CSKA Moscow

Senior career*
Years	Team	Apps	(Gls)
2002	FC Torpedo-ZIL Moscow	0	(0)
2002	FC Arsenal Tula	1	(0)
2004	FC Reutov	3	(0)
2004–2005	FC Volga Tver	29	(12)
2005	FC Nara-Desna Naro-Fominsk	11	(3)
2006	FC Anzhi Makhachkala	2	(0)
2006–2007	FC Volga Tver	25	(8)
2007	FC Trud Voronezh (amateur)		
2008	FC Metallurg Lipetsk	20	(4)
2010–2012	FC Metallurg Lipetsk	35	(7)
- * Club domestic league appearances and goals

Kirill Valeryevich Kruze (Russian: Кирилл Валерьевич Крузе; born 13 October 1983) is a former Russian professional football player.

== Club career ==
He made his Russian Football National League debut for FC Anzhi Makhachkala on 17 July 2006 in a game against FC Spartak Nizhny Novgorod. That was his only season in the FNL.
