= Leigh Ann Mills =

American professional golfer (born 1966)

Personal information
- Nationality: United States
- Born: 1966 (age 59–60) Coral Springs, Florida, U.S.

Career
- Sport: Golf
- College: Florida State University
- Turned professional: 1988
- Former tours: LPGA Tour (1993–2003); Ladies Asian Golf Tour; ALPG Tour; Futures Tour
- Professional wins: 4

Number of wins by tour
- Ladies Asian Golf Tour: 1
- Other: 3

Best results in LPGA major championships
- Women's PGA C'ship: T46: 2000
- U.S. Women's Open: CUT: 1987, 1999, 2002
- du Maurier Classic: T18: 1994

Leigh Ann Mills (born c. 1966) is an American former professional golfer who played on the LPGA Tour from 1993 to 2003. She was runner-up at the 1995 Edina Realty LPGA Classic and collected four worldwide titles.

== Early life and amateur career ==
Mills started playing golf at the age of 8 and was taught to play by her father Bob. She cites Bob Toski as another individual influencing her game.

Mills attended Florida State University from 1984 to 1988 and played with the Florida State Seminoles women's golf team. She recorded 15 top-10 finishes in collegiate competition, and posted a fourth-place finish at the 1987 Doral Invitational. She was a semifinalist at the 1988 Women's Western Open.

== Professional career ==
Mills turned professional after graduating in 1988 and competed internationally prior to joining the LPGA Tour. In 1990, she won the Indonesia Ladies Open on the Ladies Asian Golf Tour and the Ängsö Ladies Open on the Swedish Golf Tour, a stroke ahead of Pia Wiberg and two ahead of Annika Sörenstam in third. In 1991, she won the International Women's Open and Windsor Park Futures Classic. On the ALPG Tour, she was runner-up at the 1992 Australian Ladies Masters and again in 1993, a stroke behind Laura Davies.

In 1992, Mills qualified for the LPGA Tour by tying for 29th at the LPGA Final Qualifying Tournament to earn non-exempt status for the 1993 season. The following year, she finished first and earned fully exempt status for the 1994 season. Mills appeared in 220 LPGA events and recorded a career-best finish of second place at the 1995 Edina Realty LPGA Classic a stroke behind Julie Piers, and tied for third at the 1999 Giant Eagle LPGA Classic.

Mills recorded a career-low 66 during the first round of the 1994 du Maurier Classic and finished tied 22nd. In total, she competed in 11 major championships between 1987 and 2002 with a best finish of tied 18th at the 2000 du Maurier Classic.

She was ranked as high as 75th in the world in 1995.

== Coaching career ==
Mills retired after 14 seasons on tour to become an assistant coach at Temple University.

== Professional wins (4) ==
=== Ladies Asian Golf Tour wins (1) ===
- 1990 Indonesia Ladies Open

=== Swedish Golf Tour Tour (1) ===
No.	Date	Tournament	Winning score	Margin of victory	Runner-up
1	17 Jun 1990	Ängsö Ladies Open	223 (+7)	1 stroke	(Sweden) Pia Wiberg

=== Other wins (2) ===
- 1991 International Women's Open, Windsor Park Futures Classic

== Results in LPGA majors ==
Tournament	1987	1988	1989	1990	1991	1992	1993	1994	1995	1996	1997	1998	1999	2000	2001	2002
LPGA Championship								CUT		CUT				T46		
U.S. Women's Open	CUT												CUT			CUT
du Maurier Classic								T22	CUT	CUT			CUT	T18		

Did not play

CUT = missed the half-way cut
T = tied

== See also ==
- List of Florida State University athletes
