= Agnieszka Kosmatka =

Polish volleyball player (born 1978)

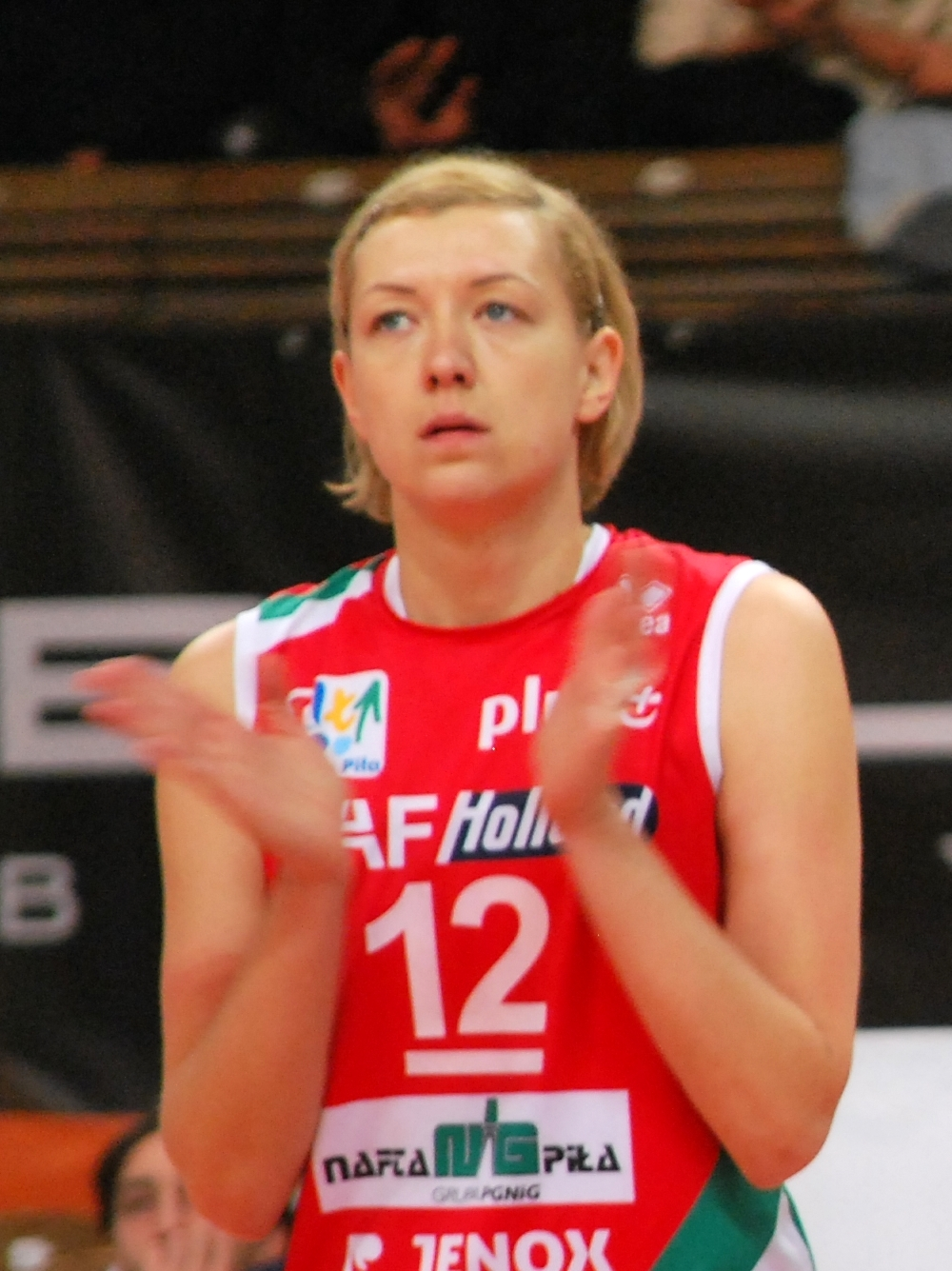
- Kosmatka in 2011

Personal information
- Nationality: Polish
- Born: 17 August 1978 (age 48)
- Height: 6ft 2in (188cm)
- Weight: 75 kg (165 lb)
- Spike: 312 cm (123 in)
- Block: 305 cm (120 in)

National team
1996-2007	Poland (96)

Agnieszka Kosmatka (born 17 August 1978) is a retired Polish volleyball player. She was part of the Poland women's national volleyball team.

She participated in the 2007 FIVB Volleyball World Grand Prix.
