= Liu Li-fang =

Taiwanese volleyball player (born 1982)

Liu Li Fang

Personal information
- Nationality: Chinese Taipei
- Born: 5 July 1982 (age 44)
- Height: 172 cm (68 in)
- Weight: 74 kg (163 lb)
- Spike: 284 cm (112 in)
- Block: 273 cm (107 in)

Volleyball information
- Number: 9 (national team)

National team
| 2002-2007 | Chinese Taipei |

Liu Li Fang (born 5 July 1982) is a retired Taiwanese female volleyball player. She was part of the Chinese Taipei women's national volleyball team.

She participated in the 2007 FIVB Volleyball World Grand Prix. She competed at the 2002 Asian Games.
