= Ekaterina Gromova =

Russian volleyball player (born 1986)

Personal information
- Nationality: Russian
- Born: 13 September 1986 (age 40)
- Height: 192 cm (76 in)
- Weight: 79 kg (174 lb)
- Spike: 312 cm (123 in)
- Block: 303 cm (119 in)

Volleyball information
- Number: 17 (national team)

National team
2007	Russia

Ekaterina Gromova (born 13 September 1986) is a retired Russian female volleyball player. She was part of the Russia women's national volleyball team whose position was opposite hitter.

She participated in the 2007 Women's European Volleyball Championship.
