= Alexandra Dzigalyuk =

Kazakhstani volleyball player (born 1970)

Personal information
- Nationality: Kazakhstani
- Born: 29 March 1970 (age 56)
- Height: 180 cm (71 in)
- Weight: 65 kg (143 lb)
- Spike: 285 cm (112 in)
- Block: 275 cm (108 in)

Volleyball information
- Number: 18 (national team)

National team
2007	Kazakhstan

Alexandra Dzigalyuk (born 29 March 1970) is a retired Kazakhstani female volleyball player. She was part of the Kazakhstan women's national volleyball team.

She participated in the 2007 FIVB Volleyball World Grand Prix.
