= Andrei Ryabov (musician) =

Andrei Vladimirovich Ryabov Андрей Владимирович Рябов
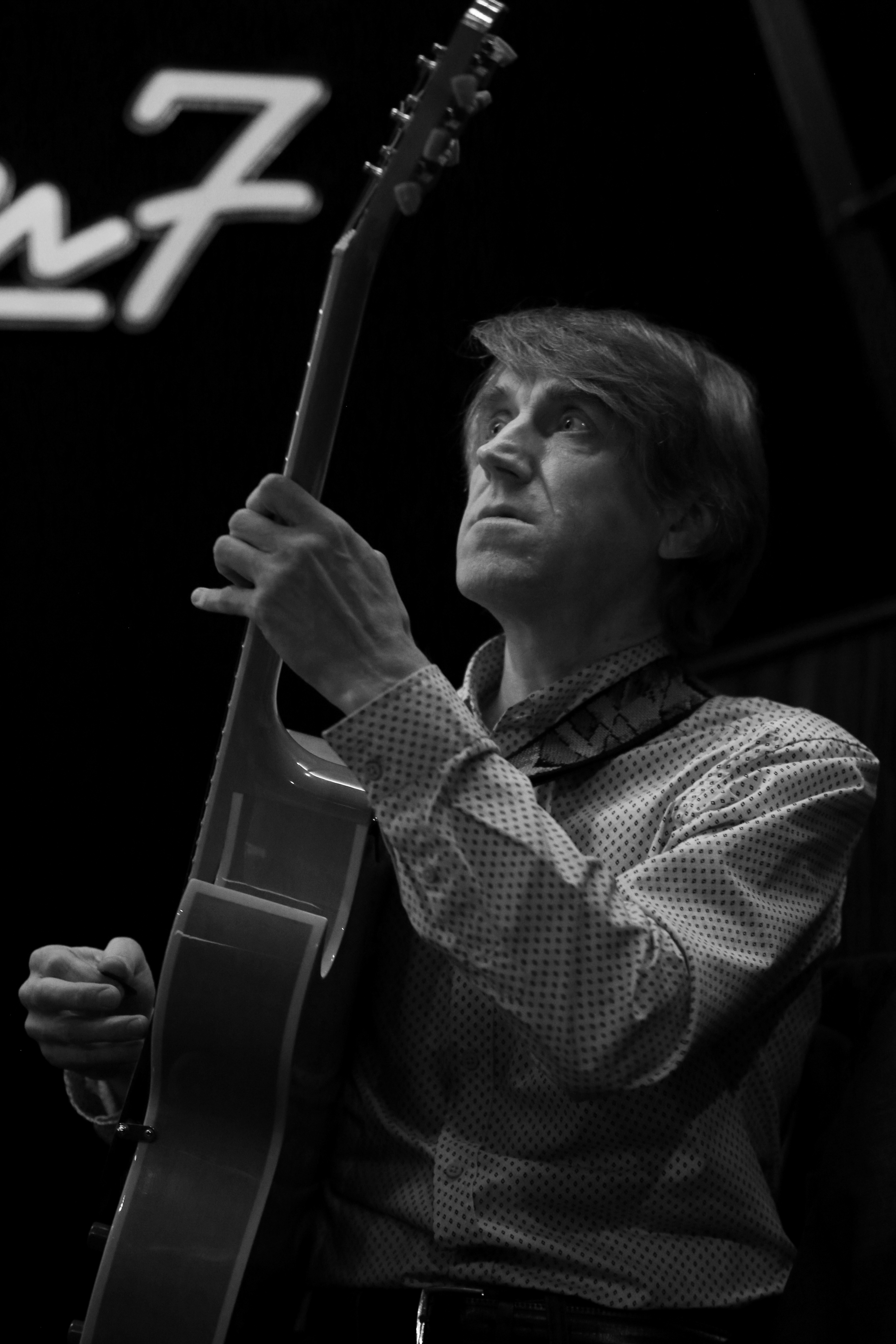
- Andrei Ryabov in 2016

Background information
- Born: July 24, 1962 (age 62); Leningrad, Russian SFSR, Soviet Union (present-day Saint Petersburg, Russia)
- Genres: Jazz
- Occupation: Musician
- Instrument: Guitar

Andrei Vladimirovich Ryabov (Note: Russian: Андрей Владимирович Рябов, romanized: Andrey Vladimirovich Ryabov) (born July 24, 1962) is a Russian-born jazz guitarist. He has worked with jazz guitarists Jim Hall, Tal Farlow, Joe Pass, Attila Zoller, and Gene Bertoncini.

== Biography ==
Born in Leningrad, USSR on July 24, 1962, Andrei Ryabov was inspired by The Beatles and other classic rock groups to begin guitar lessons at the age of eleven. A few years later, he became attracted to jazz, especially the work of George Benson, Jim Hall, Joe Pass, and Wes Montgomery.

In 1982, Andrei Ryabov earned his bachelor's degree from the Mussorgsky College of Music in Leningrad. That same year he joined David Goloschekin's Jazz Ensemble.

With Estonian guitarist Tiit Paulus Ryabov recorded his first album, Tete-a-Tete, as a leader on the Melodia label. In 1989, he became a faculty member at the Mussorgsky College of Music, teaching guitar, jazz improvisation and theory, as well as giving master classes and workshops around the country.

Annually from 1989 to 1992, the Russian Jazz Federation voted Andrei Ryabov Best Jazz Guitarist in the country. In 1992, his quartet with pianist Andrei Kondakov was recognized as the Best Jazz Ensemble of 1992. Working in Russia, Ryabov was featured at many major events throughout the Soviet Union, Europe and South America. He had a chance to meet and play with Dave Brubeck, David Friesen, Dusko Goykovich, Joe Pass, John Stowell, Roger Frampton, Sal Nistico and Richie Cole, with whom he'd recorded Leningrad Alto Madness while touring in Russia in 1989.

In June 1992, Andrei Ryabov came to the United States and for two years settled in western Massachusetts, performing at festivals, jazz clubs, and colleges. He participated in the Jazz in July program at the University of Massachusetts, where he studied and played with Billy Taylor, Ted Dunbar, and Yusef Lateef. He also participated in the Bright Moments Jazz Festival and opened for the Al Di Meola Trio at the Bowker Auditorium UMASS, as well as doing concert series with jazz guitarist Attila Zoller at the Vermont Jazz Center and other music venues in New England.

In 1994, his first American-produced album, Day Dream was released by Signature Sounds. Shortly after, Ryabov decided to move to New York City, where he continued to perform both as a frontman and accompanist. In New York he played with Richie Cole, Craig Handy, Gene Bertoncini, Hubert Laws, Jack Wilkins, Paul Bollenback, Peter Bernstein, Sergio Brandao, and Vic Juris. In 1996, he participated in the Tal Farlow Tribute concert at the Merkin Concert Hall for the New York City JFC Jazz Festival. In 2004, he was invited to perform with the Yellowjackets as broadcast on the BET TV Jam Studio program in Philadelphia. Since 2008, he has lived in St. Petersburg, Russia.

== Discography ==
- Bebop Express, with Richie Cole Alto Madness Orchestra (2008)
- Yesterdays, with Myrna Lake (2007)
- I never felt this way before, with Elina Vasiltchikova (2005)
- Back on Top, with Richie Cole Alto Madness Orchestra (2005)
- It's Easy to Remember, Andrei Ryabov Trio (2000)
- Trenton Style, with Richie Cole Alto Madness Orchestra (1999)
- Day Dream, Andrei Ryabov Quartet, Signature Sounds Recording Co. (1993)
- A Well Kept Secret, with Ted Levine, Signature Sounds Recording Co. (1993)
- Jazz At The Old Fortress, with Andrei Kondakov, Melodia (1992)
- Leningrad Alto Madness, with Richie Cole, Melodia (1990)
- Tête-à-tête, with Tiit Paulus, Melodia (1988)
- Stardust, with David Goloschekin, Melodia (1986)
- 15 Years Later, with David Goloschekin, Melodia (1984)
