= Chang Yi-chieh =

Taiwanese volleyball player (born 1979)

Chang Yi Chieh

Personal information
- Nationality: Chinese Taipei
- Born: 11 June 1979 (age 47)
- Height: 177 cm (70 in)
- Weight: 64 kg (141 lb)
- Spike: 298 cm (117 in)
- Block: 288 cm (113 in)

Volleyball information
- Number: 8 (national team)

National team
2007	Chinese Taipei

Chang Yi-Chieh (born 11 June 1979) is a retired Taiwanese female volleyball player. She was part of the Chinese Taipei women's national volleyball team.

She participated in the 2007 FIVB Volleyball World Grand Prix.
