= Dayesi Maso =

Cuban volleyball player (born 1990)

Dayesi Maso Casalis

Personal information
- Nationality: Cuban
- Born: 4 April 1990 (age 36)
- Height: 1.84 m (6 ft 0 in)
- Weight: 69 kg (152 lb)
- Spike: 314 cm (124 in)
- Block: 280 cm (110 in)

Career
Years	Teams
2010	Camagüey

National team
2010	Cuba

Dayesi Maso Casales (born 4 April 1990) is a retired Cuban volleyball player. She was part of the Cuba women's national volleyball team.

She participated at the 2010 FIVB Volleyball Women's World Championship in Japan. She played with Camagüey.

== Clubs ==
- (Cuba) Camagüey (2010)
