= Lin Yi-shan =

Taiwanese volleyball player (born 1986)

Lin Yi Shan

Personal information
- Nationality: Chinese Taipei
- Born: 28 June 1986 (age 40)
- Height: 173 cm (68 in)
- Weight: 65 kg (143 lb)
- Spike: 284 cm (112 in)
- Block: 275 cm (108 in)

Volleyball information
- Number: 17 (national team)

National team
2007	Chinese Taipei

Lin Yi-Shan (born 28 June 1986) is a retired Taiwanese female volleyball player. She was part of the Chinese Taipei women's national volleyball team.

She participated in the 2007 FIVB Volleyball World Grand Prix.
