= Charnette Fair =

American volleyball player (born 1979)

Personal information
- Nationality: American
- Born: June 29, 1979 (age 47)
- Height: 5 ft 11 in (180 cm)
- Weight: 181 lb (82 kg)
- Spike: 125 in (318 cm)
- Block: 121 in (308 cm)

Volleyball information
- Number: 4 (national team)

National team
2007	United States

Charnette Fair (born June 29, 1979) is a retired American female volleyball player. She was part of the United States women's national volleyball team.

She participated at the 2007 Pan American Games.
