= Anna Ivanova (volleyball, born 1987) =

Russian volleyball player (born 1987)

Personal information
- Nationality: Russian
- Born: 20 November 1987 (age 38)
- Height: 191 cm (6 ft 3 in)
- Weight: 75 kg (165 lb)
- Spike: 310 cm (122 in)
- Block: 305 cm (120 in)

Volleyball information
- Number: 19 (national team)

National team
2007	Russia

Anna Ivanova (Russian: Анна Иванова; born 20 November 1987) is a Russian female volleyball player. She was part of the Russia women's national volleyball team.

She participated at the 2007 FIVB World Grand Prix.
