= Wu Ya-chieh =

Taiwanese volleyball player (born 1982)

Wu Ya Chieh
Personal information
- Nationality: Chinese Taipei
- Born: 3 October 1982 (age 44)
- Height: 170 cm (67 in)
- Weight: 67 kg (148 lb)
- Spike: 281 cm (111 in)
- Block: 272 cm (107 in)

Volleyball information
- Number: 5 (national team)

National team
- Years: Team
- 2007: Chinese Taipei

Wu Ya-Chieh (born 3 October 1982) is a retired Taiwanese female volleyball player. She was part of the Chinese Taipei women's national volleyball team.

She participated in the 2007 FIVB Volleyball World Grand Prix.
