= Norisha Campbell =

American volleyball player

Personal information
- Full name: Norisha Campbell
- Born: California, United States
- Height: 6 ft 3 in (1.91 m)

Volleyball information
- Position: Middle Blocker
- Current club: Rote Raben Vilsbiburg

National team
United States

Norisha Campbell is a retired American indoor volleyball player. Until 2015, she played professionally for "Rote Raben Vilsbiburg" in Germany.

== High school and personal life ==
Norisha Campbell was born in California. She grew up in Lakeland, Florida & San Antonio, Texas and graduated from Judson High School in Converse, Texas 1998 where she played volleyball, basketball, and ran track.

== College highlights ==
Campbell, a two-time AVCA All-East Region selection, compiled 1,319 kills at Florida State University from 1998 to 2001. She added 368 total blocks, including 90 solo blocks. Campbell provided the Seminoles with a .331 attack percentage during her career, including an Atlantic Coast Conference leading .366 mark as a senior. She was honored as an All-ACC First-Team selection twice in her career. Campbell was included on the Atlantic Coast Conference 50th Anniversary Volleyball Team announced in 2002.

== Other highlights ==
Campbell has competed as part of the USA Volleyball's High Performance pipeline. She was a member of the 1999 U.S. Women's Junior National Team that competed at the FIVB World Junior Championships. Campbell was selected to participate in the 2001 USA National A2 Training Program. Outside of the United States, Campbell played professionally on the Rote Raben Vilsbiburg Club before she changed to VBC Volero Zurich (Switzerland) in 2008 and won the Double and reached the Champions League quarter-finals. When she moved back to Germany, she played for Allgäu-Team Sonthofen (Germany) and again for Rote Raben Vilsbiburg.

In 2013 Campbell took part in the 3rd season of the German TV show The Voice of Germany.

In 2014 and 2015 Campbell co-moderated and performed at the CEV (Confédération Européenne de Volleyball) annual Volleyball Gala at the Hofburg Palace in Vienna which was broadcast live by Austrian TV-channel ORF Sport. In 2016 she moderated and performed at the CEV (Confédération Européenne de Volleyball) annual Volleyball Gala in Rome which was broadcast live via Satellite internationally.
