= Alexander Ryabov =

Russian ice hockey player (born 1979)

- Born: 5 February 1979 (age 47) Samara, Russia
- Height: 6 ft 2 in (188 cm)
- Weight: 212 lb (96 kg; 15 st 2 lb)
- Position: Forward
- Played for: RSL; CSK VVS Samara
- NHL draft: Undrafted
- Playing career: 1997–2006

Alexander Ryabov (born 5 February 1979) is a Russian former professional ice hockey player. He was a long-time member with CSK VVS Samara in the Russian leagues.
