= Alyona Ryabova =

Kazakhstani volleyball player (born 1988)

Personal information
- Nationality: Kazakhstani
- Born: 13 August 1988 (age 38)
- Height: 188 cm (74 in)
- Weight: 67 kg (148 lb)
- Spike: 305 cm (120 in)
- Block: 300 cm (118 in)

Volleyball information
- Number: 15 (national team)

National team
2007	Kazakhstan

Alyona Ryabova (born 13 August 1988) is a retired Kazakhstani female volleyball player. She was part of the Kazakhstan women's national volleyball team.

She participated in the 2007 FIVB Volleyball World Grand Prix.
