= Andrey Ryabov =

Russian footballer and coach

Personal information
- Full name: Andrey Anatolyevich Ryabov
- Date of birth: 29 December 1969 (age 56)
- Place of birth: Artyom, Primorsky Krai, Russian SFSR
- Height: 1.73 m (5 ft 8 in)
- Position: Midfielder

Senior career*
Years	Team	Apps	(Gls)
1987	FC Metallurg Yaroslavsky		
1988–1990	SC TOF Vladivostok		
1991–1996	FC Okean Nakhodka	138	(7)
1993	→ FC Okean-d Nakhodka	10	(0)
1997	FC Zarya Leninsk-Kuznetsky	19	(1)
1998	FC Saturn Ramenskoye	6	(0)
1999	FC Dynamo Stavropol	15	(0)
1999–2000	FC Metallurg Lipetsk	18	(0)
2001	FC Lokomotiv Chita	31	(0)
2002–2003	FC Luch-Energiya Vladivostok	19	(0)
2003–2004	FC Okean Nakhodka	16	(0)
2005–2007	FC Portovik-Energiya Kholmsk (amateur)		
Total		272	(8)

Managerial career
- 2007: FC Portovik-Energiya Kholmsk
- 2008–2009: FC Avtodizel Ussuriysk
- 2008–2010: FC Mostovik-Primorye Ussuriysk (academy)
- 2011: FC Mostovik-Primorye Ussuriysk (director/assistant coach)
- 2012–2013: FC Luch-Energiya Vladivostok (assistant)
- * Club domestic league appearances and goals

Andrey Anatolyevich Ryabov (Russian: Андре́й Анато́льевич Ря́бов; born 29 December 1969) is a Russian professional association football coach and a former player.

== Club career ==
He played two seasons in the Russian Premier League for FC Okean Nakhodka.

From 1997 to 2001, he played in the First Division. He played for Zarya, Saturn, Dynamo Stavropol, Metallurg Lipetsk, and Lokomotiv Chita. In 2002–2003, he was a player for Luch-Energiya. In 2003, he returned to Okean. In 2005, he transferred to Portovik-Energiya, where he ended his career a year later.

He played 29 matches in the Top League.

In 2007, he served as the head coach of Portovik-Energiya, and later managed Avtodizel Ussuriysk. He worked for several years as the sporting director of Mostovik-Primorye. In 2012, he was a member of the coaching staff of Luch-Energiya.
