= David Goloschekin =

Russian jazz musician (born 1944)

David Semyonovich Goloschekin
- Давид Семёнович Голощёкин
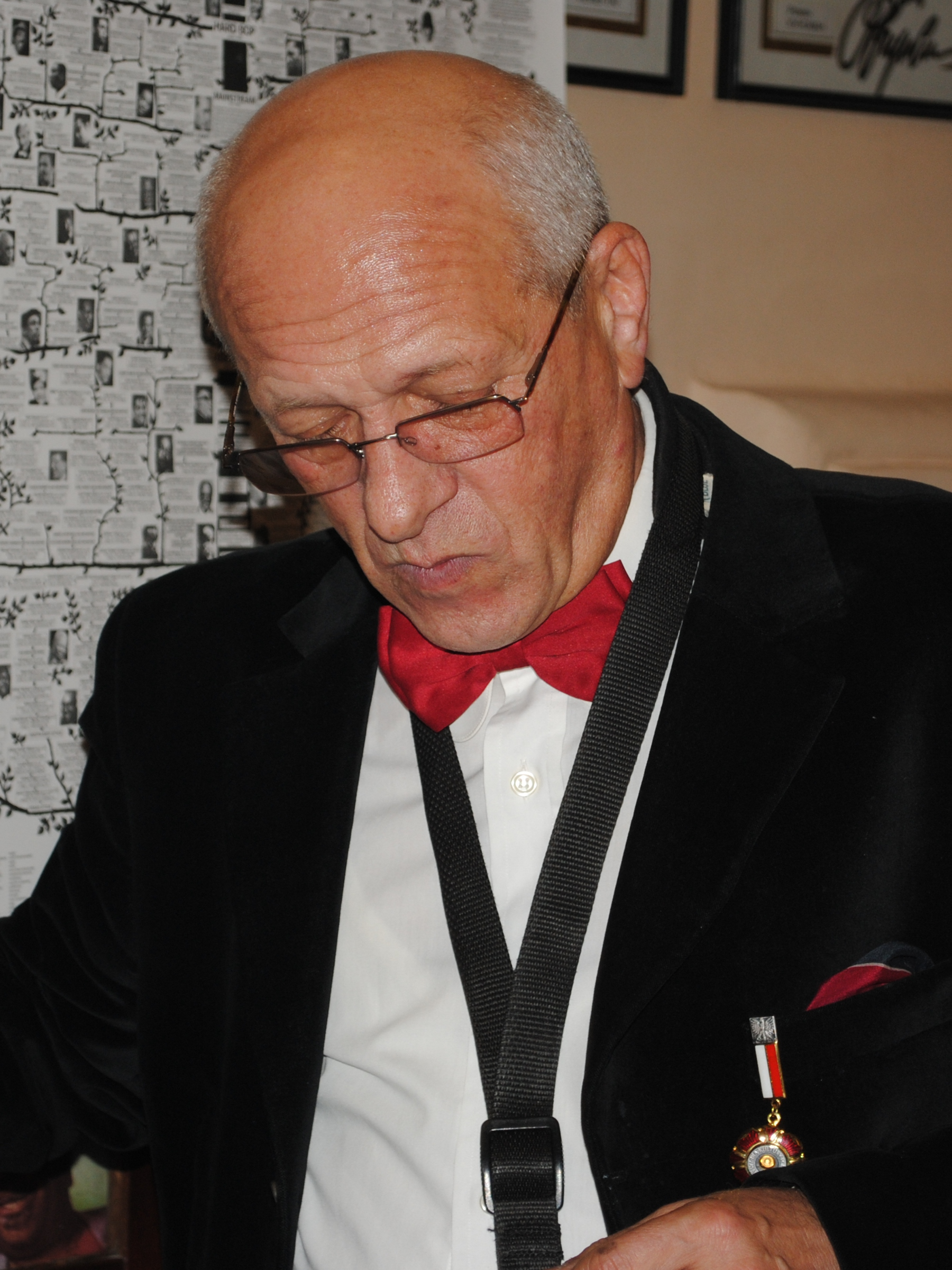
- Born: June 10, 1944 (age 80); Moscow, Soviet Union
- Occupation(s): Jjazz musician, multi-instrumentalist

David Semyonovich Goloschekin (Давид Семёнович Голощёкин; born 1944, in Moscow) is a Russian jazz musician. A multi-instrumentalist, performing on the violin (mainly), saxophone, vibraphone, piano, bass, drums and flugelhorn.

== Awards ==
- 2015 Order of Friendship, Russia.
- 1999 People's Artist of Russia
- Polish honorary badge "For Merits before Polish Culture" (odznaka honorowa «Zasłużony dla Kultury Polskiej»)
