= 2015 in German television =

This is a list of German television-related events in 2015.

== Events ==
- 5 March – After winning Unser Song für Österreich with the song "Heart of Stone" and the chance to represent Germany at the Eurovision Song Contest 2015, Andreas Kümmert dramatically declined the opportunity and gives the prize to the runner-up, Ann Sophie instead. She will now perform her song "Black Smoke" at the contest in May.
- 24 April - 13-year-old Noah-Levi Korth wins the third season of The Voice Kids.
- 5 June - Footballer Hans Sarpei and his partner Kathrin Menzinger win the eighth season of Let's Dance.
- 28 August - Former footballer David Odonkor wins season 3 of Promi Big Brother.
- 12 December - 29-year-old singer Jay Oh wins the ninth season of Das Supertalent.
- 17 December - Jamie-Lee Kriewitz wins the fifth season of The Voice of Germany.
- 22 December - Lusy Skaya wins the twelfth season of Big Brother.

== Debuts ==
- 27 February - After the Fall (Die Himmelsleiter, 2015) (ARD)
- 22 September - Big Brother Germany (2000-2011, 2015–present)

== Television shows ==
=== 1950s ===
- Tagesschau (1952–present)

=== 1960s ===
- heute (1963–present)

=== 1970s ===
- heute-journal (1978–present)
- Tagesthemen (1978–present)

=== 1980s ===
- Lindenstraße (1985–present)

=== 1990s ===
- Gute Zeiten, schlechte Zeiten (1992–present)
- Unter uns (1994–present)
- Verbotene Liebe (1995-2015)
- Schloss Einstein (1998–present)
- In aller Freundschaft (1998–present)
- Wer wird Millionär? (1999–present)

=== 2000s ===
- Deutschland sucht den Superstar (2002–present)
- Let's Dance (2006–present)
- Das Supertalent (2007–present)

=== 2010s ===
- The Voice of Germany (2011–present)
- Promi Big Brother (2013–present)

== Ending this year ==
- Verbotene Liebe (1995-2015)

== Networks and services ==
=== Launches ===
| Network | Type | Launch date | Notes | Source |
|---|---|---|---|---|
| Eo TV | Cable television | 22 December | | |

=== Conversions and rebrandings ===
| Old network name | New network name | Type | Conversion Date | Notes | Source |
|---|---|---|---|---|---|
| Passion | RTL Passion | Cable television | 11 November | | |

== See also ==
- 2015 in Germany
