= Gallery (Elaiza album) =

Studio album by Elaiza
- Released: 28 March 2014
- Recorded: 2013
- Genre: Pop
- Label: Heart of Berlin

Elaiza chronology
Gallery (2014)	Restless (2016)

Singles from Gallery
- 1. "Is it Right" Released: 28 February 2014; 2. "I Don't Love You" Released: 16 September 2014; 3. "Green" Released: 20 November 2014

Gallery is the debut studio album by German band from Berlin Elaiza. It was released in Germany on 28 March 2014. The album has peaked to number 24 on the German Albums Chart. The album includes the single "Is it Right".

== Singles ==
- "Is it Right" was released as the lead single from the album on 28 February 2014. The song has peaked to number 2 in Germany. The song was selected to represent Germany at the Eurovision Song Contest 2014 at the B&W Hallerne in Copenhagen, Denmark. During the German delegation's press conference on 6 May 2014, Germany was allocated to compete in the first half of the final. In the final, the producers of the show decided that Germany would perform 12th, following Austria and preceding Sweden. On stage, the members of Elaiza performed alone with band members Yvonne Grünwald playing the accordion, Natalie Plöger playing the contrabass and Ela Steinmetz performing lead vocal. The German performance featured paper streamers that fall over the stage during the first and last chorus. The song finished 18th in the final with 39 points.

== Track listing ==
Standard listing
No.	Title	Writer(s)	Producer(s)	Length
1.	"Fight Against Myself"	Elżbieta Steinmetz; Frank Kretschmer; Adam Kesselhaut	Frank Kretschmer; Ingo Politz	3:25
2.	"I Don't Love You"	Steinmetz; Kretschmer; Kesselhaut	Kretschmer; Politz	3:13
3.	"Green"	Steinmetz; Kretschmer; Kesselhaut	Kretschmer; Politz	2:46
4.	"Is It Right"	Steinmetz; Kretschmer; Kesselhaut	Kretschmer; Politz	3:53
5.	"Goodbye"	Steinmetz; Kretschmer; Kesselhaut	Kretschmer; Politz	3:17
6.	"Thank You"	Steinmetz; Kesselhaut	Kretschmer; Politz	4:12
7.	"Lemonade"	Steinmetz; Adam Kesselhaut; Frank Kretschmer	Kretschmer; Politz	3:18
8.	"Circle of Life"	Steinmetz; Kretschmer; Kesselhaut	Kretschmer; Politz	3:07
9.	"Without"	Steinmetz; Kretschmer	Kretschmer; Politz	4:49
10.	"Miracle"	Steinmetz; Kretschmer; Kesselhaut	Kretschmer; Politz	3:28
11.	"Cinderella"	Steinmetz; Ashley Hicklin	Kretschmer; Politz	2:54
12.	"Invisible Line"	Steinmetz; Kretschmer	Kretschmer; Politz	5:02

== Critical reception and Chart performance ==
The album has received positive reviews since their Eurovision participation so far. Rory Gannon of ESC Views gave a positive review of the album, saying that there is a "nice balance between folk and pop" and how "it shows Ela's roots in a way that you know where she's from but she's also not rubbing it in your face.". Sergiusz Królak of JazzSoul.pl claimed, that album is "full of catchy-pop songs (...) with catchy melody and not a stupid lyrics".

=== Weekly charts ===
Chart (2014)	Peak position
German Albums (Offizielle Top 100)	24

== Release history ==
Region	Release date	Format	Label
Germany	28 March 2014	Digital Download	Heart of Berlin
