= Silver into Gold =

Silver into Gold may refer to:

- Silver into Gold (film), a 1987 American short documentary film
- Silver into Gold (album), a 2015 album by Ann Sophie
