= Silver into Gold (album) =

Silver Into Gold

Studio album by Ann Sophie
- Released: 24 April 2015
- Recorded: 2014
- Genre: Pop
- Label: Polydor Records; Island Records

Ann Sophie chronology
Time Extended (2012)	Silver Into Gold (2015)	Void! (2019)

Singles from Silver Into Gold
- 1. "Jump the Gun" Released: 2 March 2015; 2. "Black Smoke" Released: 2 March 2015

Silver Into Gold is the debut studio album by German singer and songwriter Ann Sophie. It was released in Germany on 24 April 2015, through Polydor and Island. The album has peaked to number 82 on the German Albums Chart. The album includes the singles "Jump the Gun" and "Black Smoke".

== Singles ==
On 2 March 2015 she released the two singles "Jump the Gun" and "Black Smoke". Ann Sophie was revealed as one of the ten undiscovered German artists competing for the wildcard spot in Unser Song für Österreich. She performed the song "Jump the Gun" and was selected as the wildcard winner after receiving 24.1% of the vote. She competed in Unser Song für Österreich with the songs "Jump the Gun" and "Black Smoke". The latter of the two advanced to the final round of voting where it placed as the runner-up behind Andreas Kümmert and his song "Heart of Stone". However, Kümmert later declined the opportunity to represent Germany in the Eurovision Song Contest, and Ann Sophie was awarded with the chance. She performed in the final on May 23, 2015 at the Wiener Stadthalle in Vienna, Austria with the song "Black Smoke", scoring zero points after the voting.

== Track listing ==
Standard listing
No.	Title	Writer(s)	Length
1.	"Black Smoke"	Michael Harwood, Ella McMahon, Tonino Speciale	3:12
2.	"Jump the Gun"	Beatgees, Katrina Noorbergen, Laila Samuels	3:26
3.	"I Don't Know Where I'm Going"	Didrik Thott, Sebastian Thott, Carl Bjorsell, Fernando Fuentes	2:51
4.	"Lie To Me"	Rami, Carl Falk, Ina Wroldsen	3:52
5.	"Get Over Yourself"	Ann Sophie	3:12
6.	"Still That Girl"	Joy Deb, Linnea Deb, Charlie Mason	3:02
7.	"Have You Ever"	Ann Sophie	3:39
8.	"I Believed"	Steve Mac, Ina Wroldsen	3:22
9.	"See the Light"	Steve Robson, Claude Kelly, Dionne Bromfield	3:31
10.	"I Think It's a Love Song"	Ann Sophie	3:43
11.	"Changing Lights"	Hayley Aitken, Louis Schoorl	3:40
12.	"Silver Into Gold"	Ann Sophie	3:27

== Chart performance ==
Chart (2015)	Peak position
German Albums (Offizielle Top 100)	82

== Release history ==
Region	Release date	Format	Label
Germany	24 April 2015	Digital download; CD	Polydor Records; Island Records
