= Ann Sophie =

German singer (born 1996)

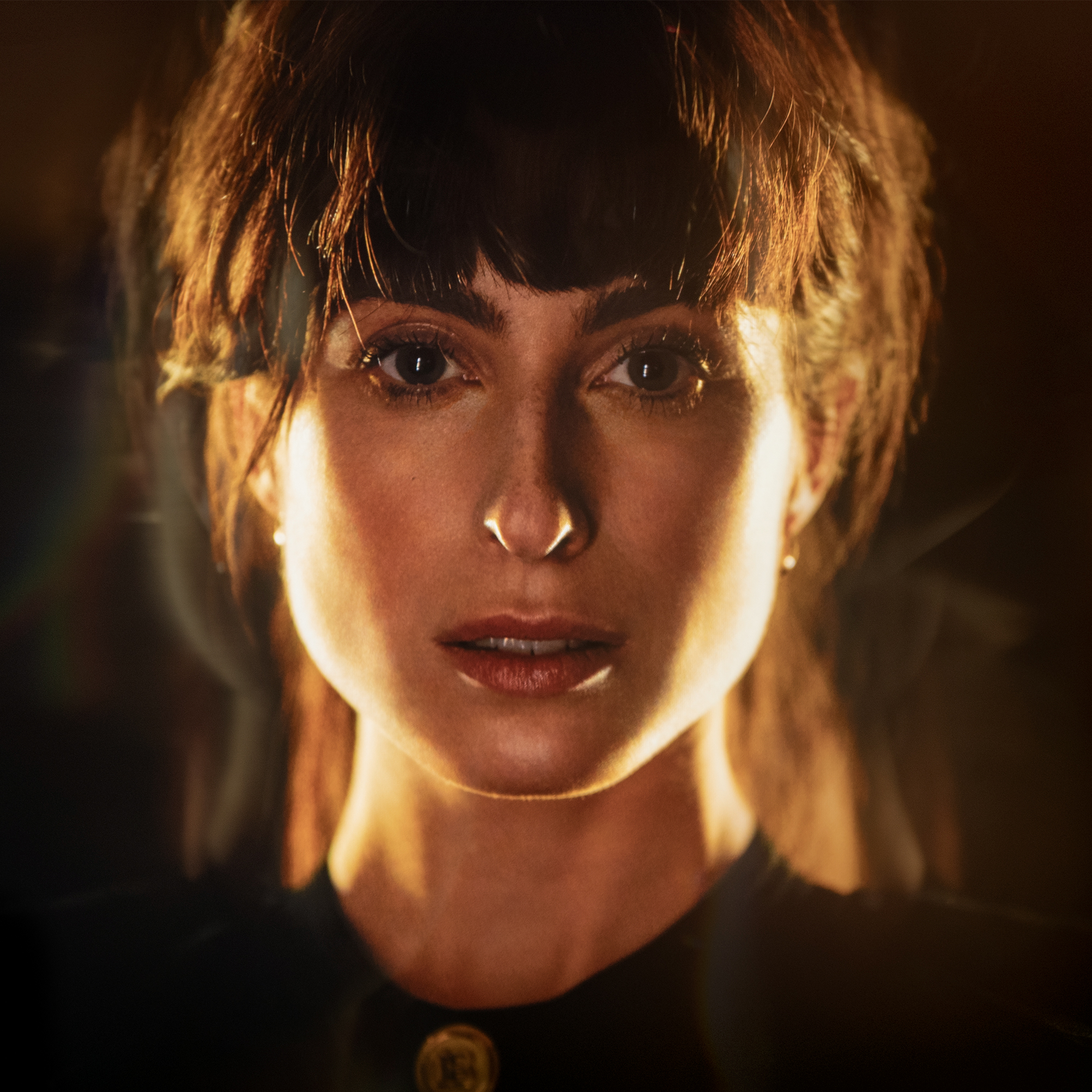
- Ann Sophie in 2021

Background information
- Also known as: Ann Sophie
- Born: Ann Sophie Dürmeyer; 1 September 1990 (age 35); London, England
- Origin: Hamburg, Germany
- Genres: Pop; R&B; soul
- Occupation: Singer
- Instrument: Vocals
- Years active: 2011–present
- Labels: Polydor Records; Island Records

Ann Sophie Dürmeyer (born 1 September 1990), better known as simply Ann Sophie, is a German singer. She represented Germany in the Eurovision Song Contest 2015 with the song "Black Smoke".

== Life and career ==
=== 1990: Early life and career ===
Ann Sophie was born on 1 September 1990 in London, England, to German parents. At a young age, she and her family moved back to Germany, where they settled in Hamburg, whilst she attended Rydal Penrhos in Colwyn Bay, North Wales, as a boarding student. At age four, she studied ballet. In 2010, she took her abitur and moved to New York City to attend the Lee Strasberg Theatre and Film Institute. In 2012, she released her debut single "Get Over Yourself", which was followed by her first album, Time Extended. Ann Sophie also set foot in the musical theatre industry and was recently known for her role as Alex Owens in the musical Flashdance as well as Indigo in the Cirque du Soleil musical Paramour.

=== 2012: Time Extended ===
Time Extended was an album made by Sophie which was released on iTunes in 2012. The album features songs that reappeared in Silver into Gold; these songs included "Have You Ever", "Get Over Yourself" and "Silver into Gold".

=== 2015: Eurovision Song Contest and Silver Into Gold ===
In 2015, Ann Sophie was revealed as one of the ten undiscovered German artists competing for the wildcard spot in Unser Song für Österreich. She performed the song "Jump the Gun" and was selected as the wildcard winner after receiving 24.1% of the vote. She competed in Unser Song für Österreich with the songs "Jump the Gun" and "Black Smoke". The latter of the two advanced to the final round of voting, where it placed as the runner-up behind Andreas Kümmert and his song "Heart of Stone". However, Kümmert later declined the opportunity to represent Germany in the Eurovision Song Contest, and Ann Sophie was awarded with the chance to compete and represent her country in the contest, to which she accepted. Sophie received very favourable reviews from critics over "Black Smoke". She released her debut studio album Silver into Gold, on 24 April 2015. The album features "Black Smoke"; this was the lead single for the album and charted successfully in Germany and Austria, with chart numbers being within the Top 30 in Germany and Top 60 in Austria. "Black Smoke" was released on 2 March 2015 as a stand-alone single. The album also features "Jump The Gun", which Sophie performed at the semi-final for the Eurovision Song Contest 2015; "Silver Into Gold" was released on iTunes 24 April 2015. In the final of the Eurovision Song Contest on 23 May 2015, Ann Sophie scored zero points after the voting, becoming the first German act to do so under the modern voting system in place since 1975. Sophie was presented in last place despite another country also getting zero points because Sophie performed after the other nul point scorer.

=== 2018–present: Musicals and Under My Skin ===
In 2018, Dürmeyer played Gloria and alternating Alex Owen in the tour through Germany, Switzerland, and Austria of the musical Flashdance. This was her first performance in a musical. Then, from 2019 to 2020, she played Indigo in Cirque Du Soleil Paramour in Hamburg, Germany. In 2020 and 2021, Ann Sophie released multiple singles that would later be part of her album Under My Skin.

From 2021–2022 she was in Flashdance again; this time she played Alex Owen in St. Gallen, Switzerland. In 2023, Ann Sophie played a Mata Hari popstar in the musical Mata Hari in Munich, Germany. In December of 2023, Ann Sophie released her third album, Under My Skin.

Then, from 2023–2024 she played Florence Vassy in Chess in Oldenburg, Germany. The same year, she played walk-in cover Satine in Moulin Rouge!. Later in the year, she played Elsa in Frozen in Stuttgart. She would play this role for 2 years.

== Theatre ==
Show	Location	Role	Year
Flashdance	Tour in Germany, Switzerland, and Austria	Gloria and alternating Alex Owen	2018
Cirque Du Soleil Paramour	Hamburg, Germany	Indigo	2019–2020
Flashdance	St. Gallen, Switzerland	Alex Owen	2021–2022
Mata Hari	Munich, Germany	Mata Hari Popstar	2023
Chess	Oldenburg, Germany	Florence Vassy	2023–2024
Moulin Rouge!	Cologne, Germany	Walk-In cover Satine	2024
Frozen	Stuttgart, Germany	Elsa	2024–2026

== Discography ==
=== Albums ===
Title	Details	Peak chart positions
Title	Details	GER
Time Extended	Released: 2012; Formats: Digital download	—
Silver Into Gold	Released: 24 April 2015; Label: Polydor Records, Island Records; Formats: Digital download, CD	82
Under My Skin	Released: 22 December 2023; Label: Recordjet; Formats: Digital download	—

=== Extended plays ===
Title	Details
Void!	Released: 15 November 2019; Label: Minna Music; Formats: Digital download, CD

=== Singles ===
Title	Year	Peak chart positions		Album
Title	Year	GER	AUT	Album
"Get Over Yourself"	2012	—	—	Time Extended and Silver Into Gold
"Jump the Gun"	2015	—	—	Silver Into Gold
"Black Smoke"	2015	26	54	Silver Into Gold
"Tornado"	2019	—	—	Under My Skin
“Bye Boy”	2019	—	—	Under My Skin
"Phantom Pain"	2020	—	—	Under My Skin
"Replay"	2021	—	—	Under My Skin
"The Real You"	2021	—	—	Under My Skin
“Selfish”	2021	—	—	Under My Skin
“April”	2021	—	—	
“Quicksand”	2021	—	—	Under My Skin
“Orchidee”	2023	—	—	From the musical “Mata Hari”
"Moves"	2023	—	—	Under My Skin
"I Love It!"	2024	—	—	Under My Skin
"Emptiness"	2024	—	—	
"R U Thirsty?!"	2025	—	—	
“R U Hungry?!”	2025	—	—	
“Du Bist Alles (Cover)”	2026	—	—	From the musical “Frozen”
"—" denotes a single that did not chart or was not released.

Awards and achievements
Preceded by Elaiza with "Is It Right"	Germany in the Eurovision Song Contest; 2015	Succeeded by Jamie-Lee Kriewitz with "Ghost"
