= Germany in the Eurovision Song Contest 2015 =

- Eurovision Song Contest 2015
- Participating broadcaster: ARD (Note: Arbeitsgemeinschaft der öffentlich-rechtlichen Rundfunkanstalten der Bundesrepublik Deutschland) – Norddeutscher Rundfunk (NDR)
- Country: Germany
- Selection process: Unser Song für Österreich
- Selection date: 5 March 2015

Competing entry
- Song: "Black Smoke"
- Artist: Ann Sophie
- Songwriters: Michael Harwood; Ella McMahon; Tonino Speciale

Placement
- Final result: 27th (last), 0 points

Participation chronology

Germany was represented at the Eurovision Song Contest 2015 with the song "Black Smoke", written by Michael Harwood, Ella McMahon, and Tonino Speciale, and performed by Ann Sophie. The German participating broadcaster on behalf of ARD, Norddeutscher Rundfunk (NDR), selected its entry for the contest through the national final Unser Song für Österreich. The national final took place on 3 March 2015 and featured eight competing acts, one of which was selected through a Club Concert wildcard round. The winner was selected through three rounds of public televoting, and "Heart of Stone" performed by Andreas Kümmert initially announced as the German entry for Vienna after gaining 78.7% of the votes in the third round, however the artist immediately forfeited his victory upon the announcement. The confirmation of national final runner-up "Black Smoke" performed by Ann Sophie as the German entry occurred during a post-show press conference. The unprecedented withdrawal of Kümmert garnered international media interest.

As a member of the "Big Five", Germany automatically qualified to compete in the final of the Eurovision Song Contest. Performing in position 17, Germany placed twenty-seventh (last) out of the 27 participating countries and failed to score any points, making it the sixth time the nation had placed last in the history of the competition and the third time the nation received nul points.

== Background ==
Prior to the 2015 contest, ARD had participated in the Eurovision Song Contest representing Germany fifty-eight times since its debut in 1956. It has won the contest on two occasions: in 1982 with the song "Ein bißchen Frieden" performed by Nicole and in 2010 with the song "Satellite" performed by Lena. Germany, to this point, has been noted for having competed in the contest more than any other country; they have competed in every contest since the first edition in 1956 except in 1996 when it was eliminated in a pre-contest elimination round. In 2014, the German entry "Is It Right" performed by Elaiza placed eighteenth out of twenty-six competing songs scoring 39 points.

As part of its duties as participating broadcaster, ARD organises the selection of its entry in the Eurovision Song Contest and broadcasts the event in the country. Since 1996, ARD had delegated the participation in the contest to its member Norddeutscher Rundfunk (NDR). NDR confirmed that it would participate in the 2015 contest on 23 May 2014. Since 2013, NDR had set up national finals with several artists to choose both the song and performer to compete at Eurovision for Germany. On 8 September 2014, the broadcaster announced that they would organise a multi-artist national final to select the German entry.

== Before Eurovision ==
=== Unser Song für Österreich ===
Unser Song für Österreich (English: Our Song for Austria) was the competition that selected Germany's entry for the Eurovision Song Contest 2015. The competition took place on 5 March 2015 at the TUI Arena in Hannover, hosted by Barbara Schöneberger with Janin Reinhardt reporting from the green room. Like in the previous five years, the national final was co-produced by the production company Brainpool, which also co-produced the Eurovision Song Contest 2011 in Düsseldorf and the Eurovision Song Contest 2012 in Baku. Eight acts, one of them selected through a wildcard round, competed during the show with the winner being selected through a public televote. The show was broadcast on Das Erste and EinsFestival as well as online via the broadcaster's Eurovision Song Contest website eurovision.de.

==== Competing entries ====
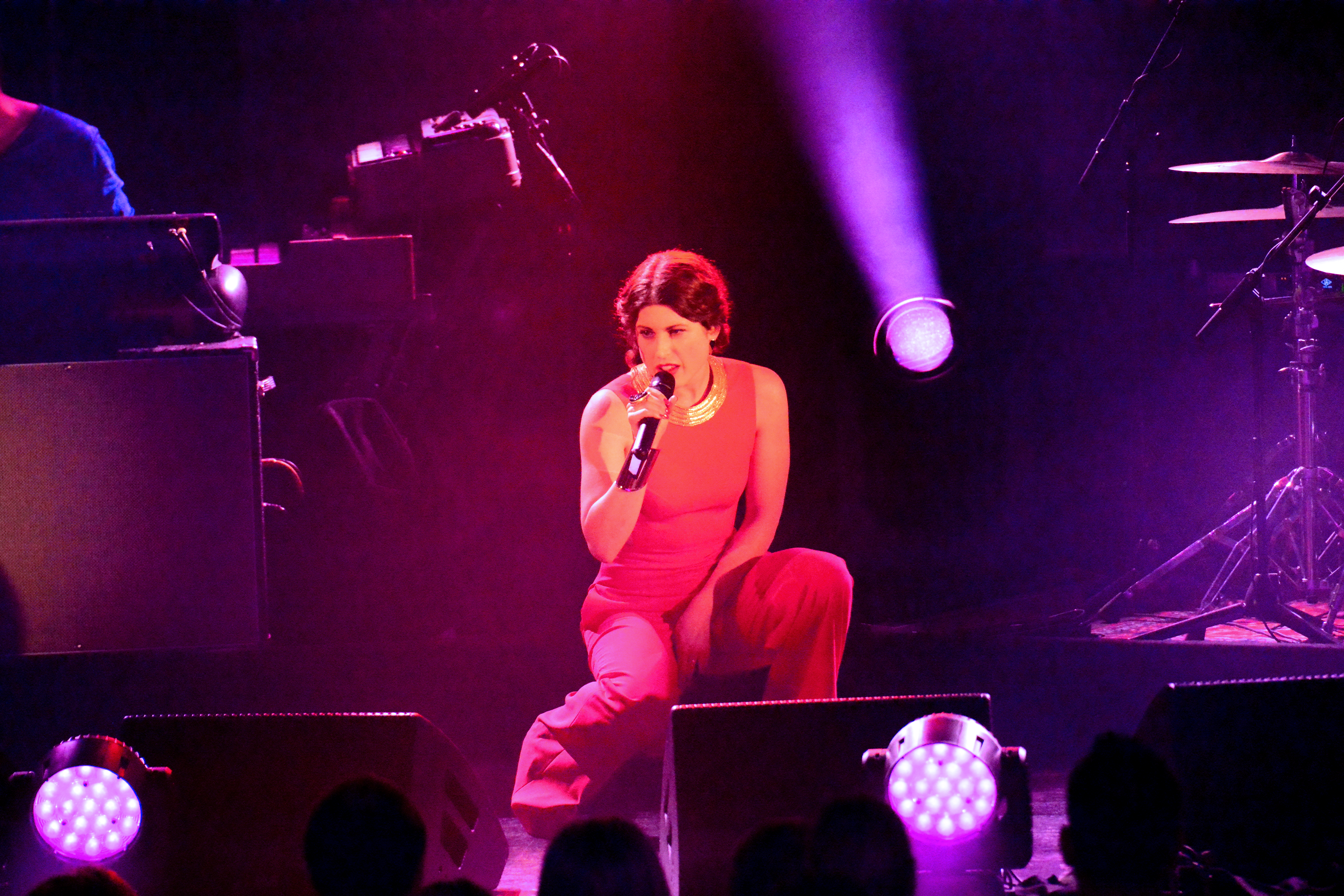
Ann Sophie performing at the Club Concert of Unser Song für Österreich

Seven competing artists were selected by a nine-member panel consisting of Thomas Schreiber (ARD entertainment coordinator, head of the fiction and entertainment department for NDR), Steffen Müller (Warner Music Entertainment managing director for Central Europe), Konrad von Löhneysen (Embassy of Music managing director), Tom Bohne (Universal Music Senior Vice President), Aditya Sharma (Radio Fritz lead music editor), Nico Gössel (Sony Music head of promotion), Norbert Grundei (N-Joy program director), Jörg Grabosch (Brainpool managing director) and Claudia Gliedt (lead music editor for Brainpool). The seven participating acts were announced on 14 January 2015, while an additional act was selected through a wildcard round.

For the wildcard round, interested performers were able to apply by uploading a performance clip of an original or cover song via YouTube between 8 September 2014 and 9 January 2015. Singer-songwriter Andreas Bourani headed the campaign to encourage artists to apply. By the end of the process, it was announced that 1,213 applications were received and ten performers were selected by the nine-member panel. The ten participating artists each performed an original song during a Club Concert show that took place on 19 February 2015 at the Große Freiheit 36 in Hamburg, hosted by Barbara Schöneberger with Janin Reinhardt reporting from the green room and was broadcast on NDR Fernsehen and EinsPlus as well as online via eurovision.de. The winner, Ann Sophie, was selected solely by public televoting, including options for landline and SMS voting, and proceeded to the national final.

Club Concert – 19 February 2015
R/O	Artist	Song	Songwriter(s)	Televote	Place
1	Klangpoet	"4 U"	Stephan Baader, Ekrem Karaca, N'Gom, Zett1	11.6%	4
2	Lars Pinkwart	"Tornado"	Lars Pinkwart	5.7%	8
3	Sophie	"Imperfection"	Guido Schwarz	8.0%	5
4	Moonjos	"Haggard Heart"	Ben Galliers, Daniel Munoz, Ricardo Munoz	12.0%	3
5	Louisa	"Boomerang"	Rupert Blackman, Eyelar Mirzazadeh	2.5%	10
6	Aden Jaron	"We're on Fire"	Aden Jaron	7.3%	7
7	Alisson Bonnefoy	"Burning Down"	Alisson Bonnefoy	7.5%	6
8	Ann Sophie	"Jump the Gun"	The Beatgees, Katrina Noorbergen, Laila Samuelsen	24.1%	1
9	Sendi	"Battlefield"	Sendi Hoxha	3.2%	9
10	Ason	"Hey You"	Dorotea Andersson	18.1%	2

Artist	Song	Songwriter(s)
Alexa Feser	"Das Gold von morgen"	Steve van Velvet, Alexa Feser
Alexa Feser	"Glück"	Steve van Velvet, Alexa Feser
Andreas Kümmert	"Heart of Stone"	Andreas Kümmert, Christian Neander
Andreas Kümmert	"Home Is in My Hands"	Andreas Kümmert, Christian Neander
Ann Sophie	"Black Smoke"	Michael Harwood, Ella McMahon, Tonino Speciale
Ann Sophie	"Jump the Gun"	Beatgees, Katrina Noorbergen, Laila Samuels
Fahrenhaidt feat. Amanda Pedersen	"Frozen Silence"	Andreas John, Erik Macholl, Amanda Pedersen
Fahrenhaidt	"Mother Earth"	Andreas John, Erik Macholl, Alexander Freund, Fiora Cutler
Faun	"Abschied"	Ingo Politz, Bernd Wendlandt, Faun, Oliver Pade, Michael Frewert
Faun	"Hörst du die Trommeln"	Ingo Politz, Bernd Wendlandt, Faun
Laing	"Wechselt die Beleuchtung"	Nicola Rost, Moritz Friedrich
Laing	"Zeig deine Muskeln"	Michael Vajna, Nicola Rost
Mrs. Greenbird	"Shine Shine Shine"	Chris Buseck, Sarah Nücken, Steffen Brückner
Mrs. Greenbird	"Take My Hand"	Sarah Nücken, Steffen Brückner
Noize Generation feat. Patrik Jean	"A Song for You"	Linnea Deb, Joyce Leong, Anton Malmberg Hård af Segerstad, Jewgeni Grischbowski
Noize Generation	"Crazy Now"	Jewgeni Grischbowski, Axel Ehnström

==== Final ====
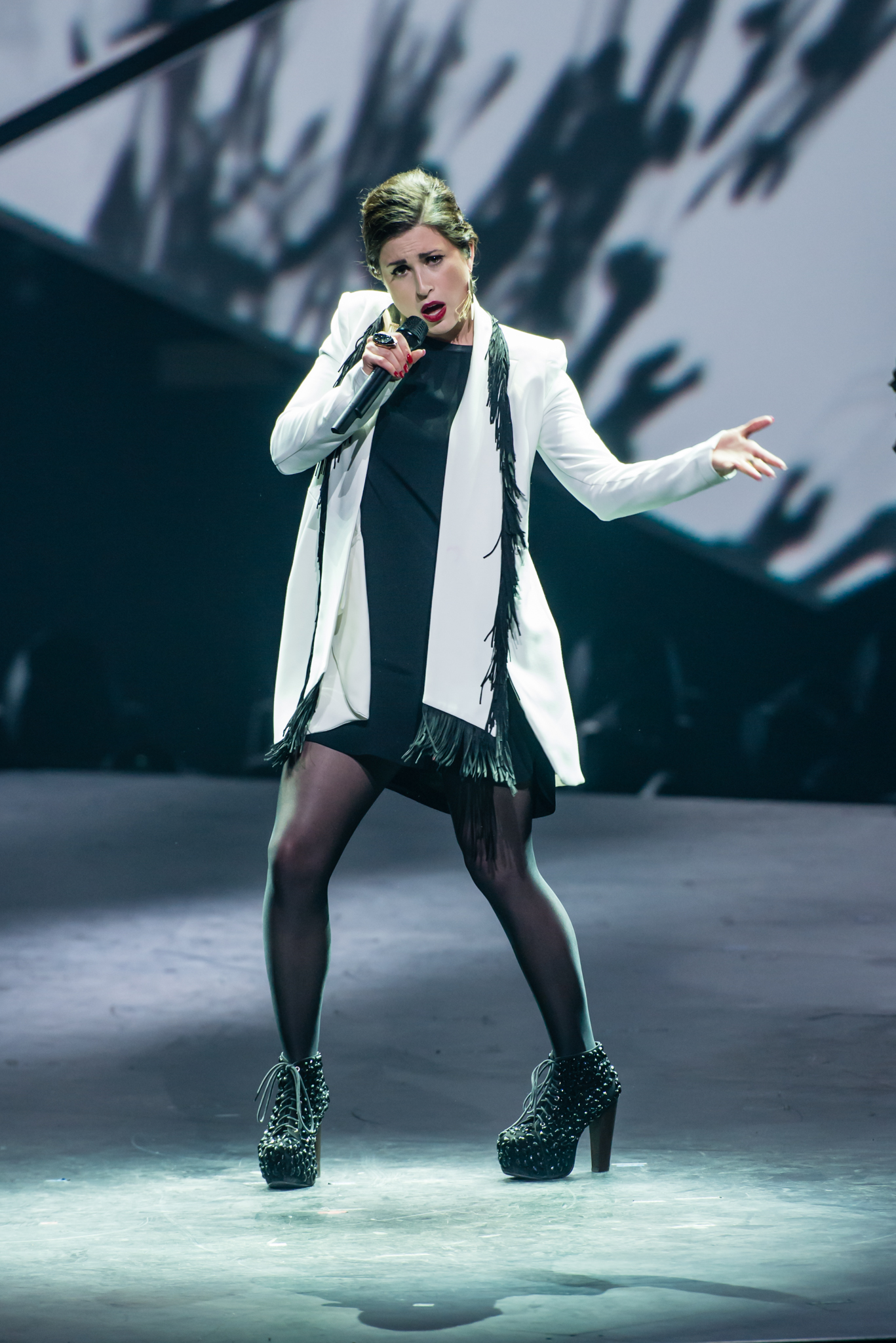
Ann Sophie performing at Unser Song für Österreich

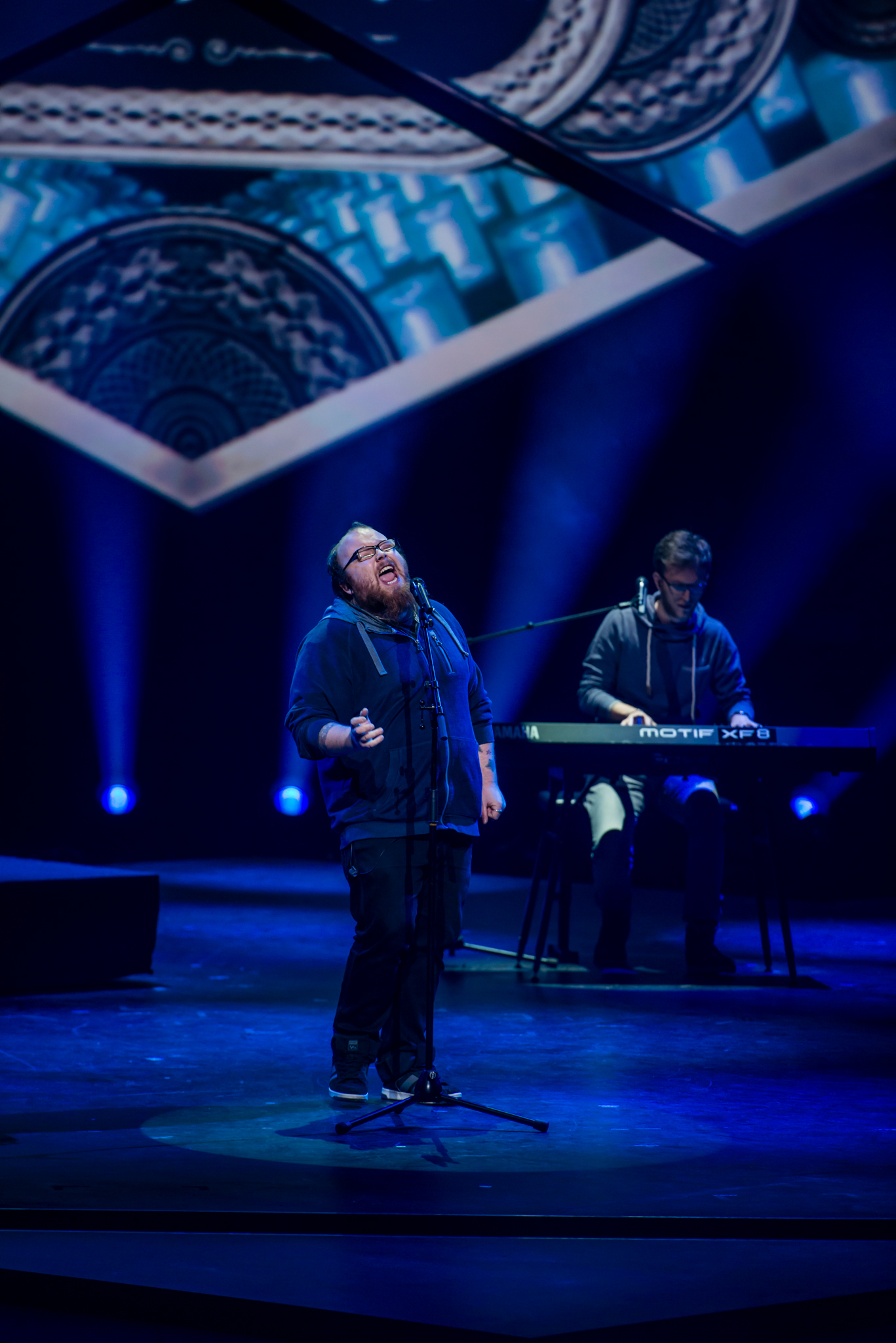
Andreas Kümmert performing at Unser Song für Österreich

The televised final took place on 3 March 2015. The winner was selected through three rounds of public televoting, including options for landline and SMS voting. In the first round of voting, each artist performed their selected first of their two songs and the top four artists were selected to proceed to the second round. In the second round, the four remaining artists performed their second song and the top two artists with one song each were selected to proceed to the final round. In the final round, "Heart of Stone" performed by Andreas Kümmert was announced as the winner, however Kümmert stated shortly after that he would cede his victory for runner-up Ann Sophie: "Thanks for your support, Germany, but right now I'm not in the right condition to do this and I want to give the chance to Ann Sophie. I'm just a little singer and she is the better choice." Following the show, NDR held a press conference confirming "Black Smoke" performed by Ann Sophie as the German entry for the 2015 Eurovision Song Contest. His unprecedented decision to withdraw later garnered international media attention. In addition to the performances of the competing entries, Conchita Wurst, who won Eurovision for Austria in 2014, performed her entry "Rise Like a Phoenix" and her new song "You Are Unstoppable", while Mark Forster performed his song "Flash mich" and Swiss singer Stefanie Heinzmann performed her new song "In the End" during the show.

First Round – 3 March 2015
R/O	Artist	Song	Result
1	Mrs. Greenbird	"Shine Shine Shine"	—N/a
2	Alexa Feser	"Glück"	Advanced
3	Faun	"Hörst du die Trommeln"	—N/a
4	Noize Generation feat. Patrik Jean	"A Song for You"	—N/a
5	Ann Sophie	"Jump the Gun"	Advanced
6	Fahrenhaidt feat. Amanda Pedersen	"Frozen Silence"	—N/a
7	Laing	"Zeig deine Muskeln"	Advanced
8	Andreas Kümmert	"Home Is in My Hands"	Advanced

Second Round – 3 March 2015
R/O	Artist	Song	Result
1	Alexa Feser	"Das Gold von morgen"	—N/a
1	Alexa Feser	"Glück"	—N/a
2	Ann Sophie	"Black Smoke"	Advanced
2	Ann Sophie	"Jump the Gun"	—N/a
3	Laing	"Wechselt die Beleuchtung"	—N/a
3	Laing	"Zeig deine Muskeln"	—N/a
4	Andreas Kümmert	"Heart of Stone"	Advanced
4	Andreas Kümmert	"Home Is in My Hands"	—N/a

Winner

Third Round – 3 March 2015
R/O	Artist	Song	Televote	Place
1	Ann Sophie	"Black Smoke"	21.3%	2
2	Andreas Kümmert	"Heart of Stone"	78.7%	1

==== Ratings ====
Viewing figures by show
Show	Air date	Viewing figures		Ref.
Show	Air date	Nominal	Share	Ref.
Club Concert	19 February 2015	520,000	2.4%	
Final	3 March 2015	3,200,000	10.3%	

=== Promotion ===
Ann Sophie made several appearances across Europe to specifically promote "Black Smoke" as the German Eurovision entry. On 18 April, Ann Sophie performed during the Eurovision in Concert event which was held at the Melkweg venue in Amsterdam, Netherlands and hosted by Cornald Maas and Edsilia Rombley. On 26 April, Ann Sophie performed during the London Eurovision Party, which was held at the Café de Paris venue in London, United Kingdom and hosted by Nicki French and Paddy O'Connell.

== At Eurovision ==
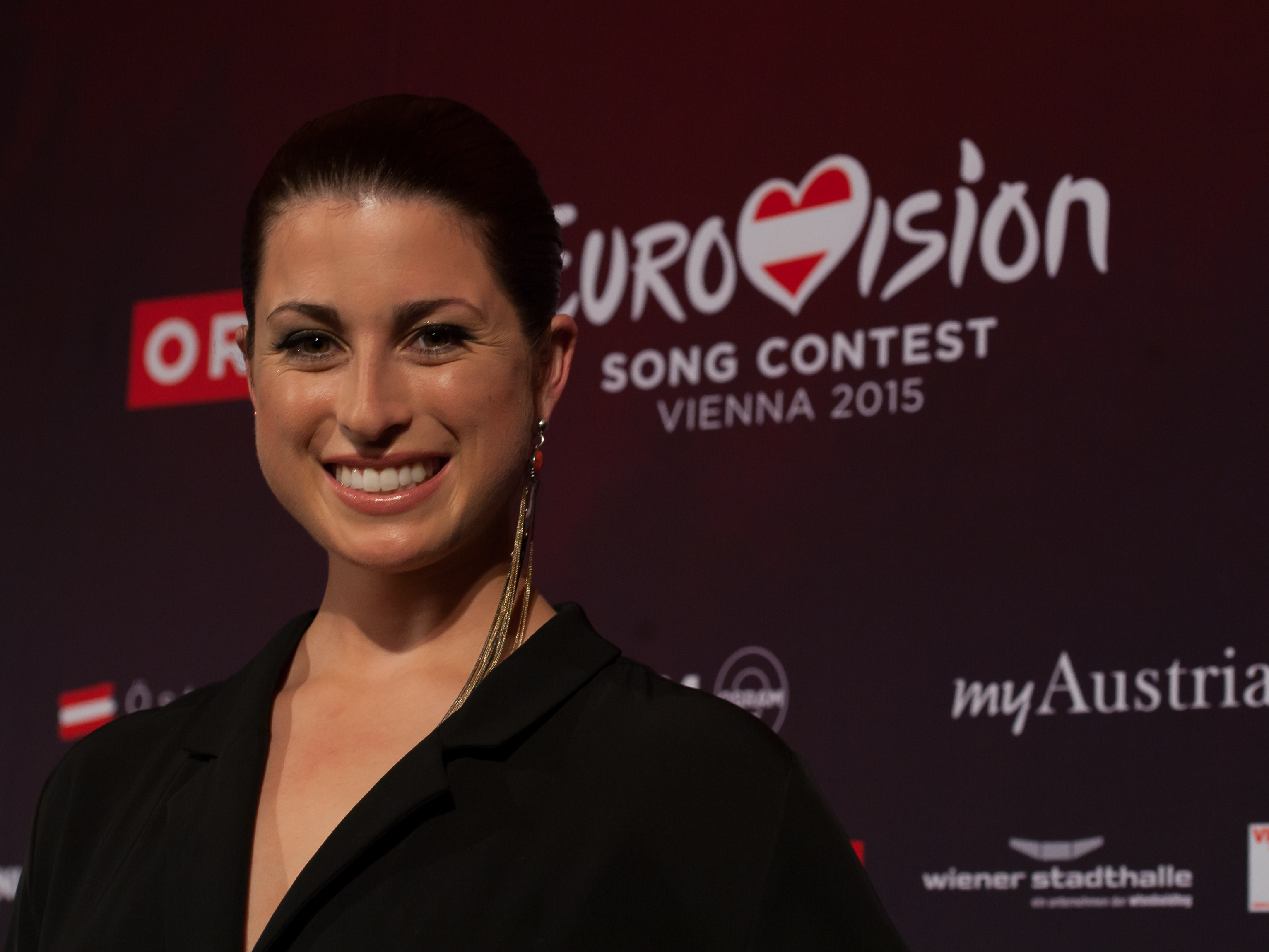
Ann Sophie during a press meet and greet

According to Eurovision rules, all nations with the exceptions of the host country and the "Big Five" (France, Germany, Italy, Spain and the United Kingdom) are required to qualify from one of two semi-finals in order to compete for the final; the top ten countries from each semi-final progress to the final. In the 2015 contest, Australia also competed directly in the final as an invited guest nation. As a member of the "Big Five", Germany automatically qualified to compete in the final on 23 May 2015. In addition to their participation in the final, Germany was also required to broadcast and vote in one of the two semi-finals. During the semi-final allocation draw on 26 January 2015, Germany was assigned to broadcast and vote in the second semi-final on 21 May 2015.

In Germany, the two semi-finals were broadcast on EinsFestival and Phoenix, and the final was broadcast on Das Erste. All broadcasts featured commentary by Peter Urban. ARD also broadcast the three shows with sign language performers for the hearing impaired on EinsPlus. The final was watched by 8.09 million viewers in Germany, which meant a market share of 33.8 per cent. NDR appointed Barbara Schöneberger as its spokesperson to announced the top 12-point score awarded by Germany.

=== Final ===
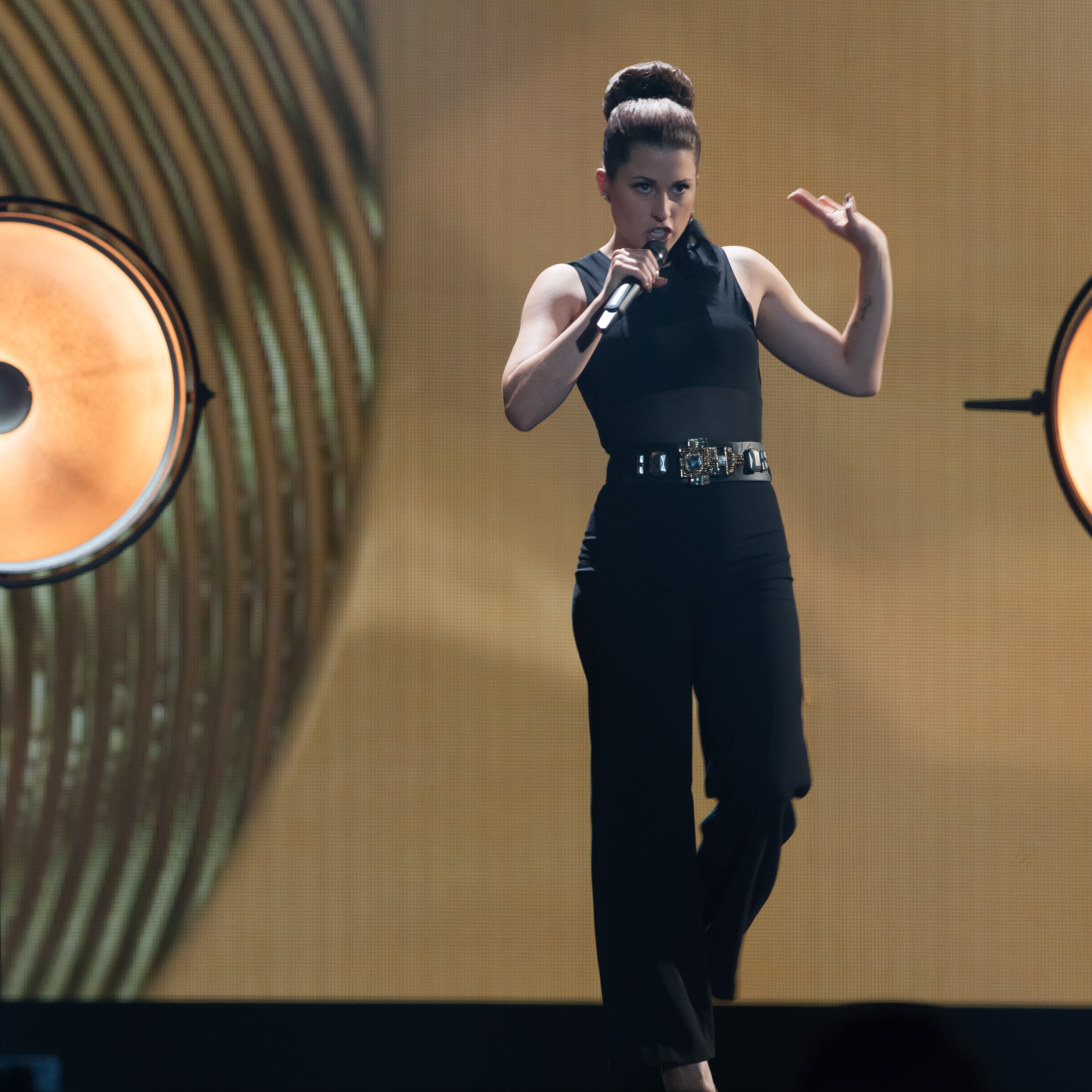
Ann Sophie during a rehearsal before the final

Ann Sophie took part in technical rehearsals on 17 and 20 May, followed by dress rehearsals on 22 and 23 May. This included the jury final on 22 May where the professional juries of each country watched and voted on the competing entries. After technical rehearsals were held on 20 May, the "Big Five" countries, host country Austria and special guest Australia held a press conference. As part of this press conference, the artists took part in a draw to determine which half of the grand final they would subsequently participate in. Germany was drawn to compete in the second half. Following the conclusion of the second semi-final, the shows' producers decided upon the running order of the final. The running order for the semi-finals and final was decided by the shows' producers rather than through another draw, so that similar songs were not placed next to each other. Germany was subsequently placed to perform in position 17, following the entry from Montenegro and before the entry from Poland.

The German performance featured Ann Sophie performing on stage in a black pantsuit, high heels and a single large gold earring with black feathers with four backing vocalists. The staging presentation included yellow spotlights and lamps as well as Ann Sophie performing a routine that included walking, gesturing and dancing. The stage colours were black and white with the LED screens displaying black smoke. The four backing vocalists that joined Ann Sophie on stage were Giovanna Winterfeldt, Bibi Vongehr, Lan Syreen and Kayna Okwuazu. Germany placed twenty-seventh (last) in the final, failing to score any points. The nation initially tied with Austria as both countries finished with zero points, however, due to a tiebreaker rule that favours the song performed earliest in the running order, Germany was placed twenty-seventh, while Austria, which performed in position 14 during the final, placed twenty-sixth. This was the sixth time Germany finished in last place and the third time the nation received nul points, the previous occasions being in 1964 and 1965.

=== Voting ===
Voting during the three shows consisted of 50 percent public televoting and 50 percent from a jury deliberation. The jury consisted of five music industry professionals who were citizens of the country they represent, with their names published before the contest to ensure transparency. This jury was asked to judge each contestant based on: vocal capacity; the stage performance; the song's composition and originality; and the overall impression by the act. In addition, no member of a national jury could be related in any way to any of the competing acts in such a way that they cannot vote impartially and independently. The individual rankings of each jury member were released shortly after the grand final.

Following the release of the full split voting by the EBU after the conclusion of the competition, it was revealed that Germany had placed twenty-fifth with the public televote and twentieth with the jury vote. In the public vote, Germany scored 5 points and in the jury vote the nation scored 24 points.

Below is a breakdown of points awarded to Germany and awarded by Germany in the second semi-final and grand final of the contest, and the breakdown of the jury voting and televoting conducted during the two shows:

==== Points awarded to Germany ====
Germany did not receive any points at the Eurovision Song Contest 2015.

==== Points awarded by Germany ====
Points awarded by Germany (Semi-final 2)
Score	Country
12 points	Sweden
10 points	Latvia
8 points	Israel
7 points	Norway
6 points	Slovenia
5 points	Cyprus
4 points	Czech Republic
3 points	Poland
2 points	Ireland
1 point	Portugal

Points awarded by Germany (Final)
Score	Country
12 points	Russia
10 points	Sweden
8 points	Belgium
7 points	Australia
6 points	Latvia
5 points	Israel
4 points	Norway
3 points	Italy
2 points	Estonia
1 point	Hungary

==== Detailed voting results ====
The following members comprised the German jury:

- Johannes Strate (jury chairperson) – bandleader, singer, songwriter
- Leslie Clio – singer, songwriter
- Mark Ćwiertnia (Mark Forster) – singer, songwriter
- Sascha Reimann (Ferris MC) – musician, rapper, actor
- Swen Meyer – music producer

Detailed voting results from Germany (Semi-final 2)
R/O	Country	J. Strate	L. Clio	M. Forster	Ferris MC	S. Meyer	Jury Rank	Televote Rank	Combined Rank	Points
01	Lithuania	12	3	9	15	14	10	10	11	
02	Ireland	8	4	7	5	3	4	12	9	2
03	San Marino	17	17	17	17	17	17	15	16	
04	Montenegro	16	10	13	11	10	13	11	12	
05	Malta	13	8	11	6	7	9	17	14	
06	Norway	3	1	3	4	2	2	8	4	7
07	Portugal	7	9	14	12	13	11	9	10	1
08	Czech Republic	5	13	6	2	12	6	7	7	4
09	Israel	6	6	4	9	9	5	2	3	8
10	Latvia	1	2	1	1	1	1	5	2	10
11	Azerbaijan	11	16	8	7	16	12	13	13	
12	Iceland	14	14	15	16	8	16	16	17	
13	Sweden	2	5	2	3	4	3	3	1	12
14	Switzerland	15	12	10	13	11	14	14	15	
15	Cyprus	4	11	5	14	5	7	6	6	5
16	Slovenia	9	7	12	10	6	8	4	5	6
17	Poland	10	15	16	8	15	15	1	8	3

Detailed voting results from Germany (Final)
R/O	Country	J. Strate	L. Clio	M. Forster	Ferris MC	S. Meyer	Jury Rank	Televote Rank	Combined Rank	Points
01	Slovenia	15	8	19	13	10	10	23	20	
02	France	21	25	12	6	22	17	25	22	
03	Israel	9	7	6	18	8	9	7	6	5
04	Estonia	6	6	5	12	6	6	14	9	2
05	United Kingdom	20	20	26	14	23	23	26	26	
06	Armenia	17	23	23	21	25	24	19	23	
07	Lithuania	10	11	9	25	13	11	21	19	
08	Serbia	16	22	17	19	11	15	9	11	
09	Norway	4	4	4	3	2	3	15	7	4
10	Sweden	3	5	2	2	3	2	5	2	10
11	Cyprus	11	18	13	23	21	16	16	18	
12	Australia	8	9	8	4	9	7	3	4	7
13	Belgium	5	3	7	7	4	5	4	3	8
14	Austria	7	10	11	10	5	8	17	12	
15	Greece	13	19	16	22	18	19	13	17	
16	Montenegro	19	16	25	16	14	20	24	24	
17	Germany									
18	Poland	22	26	14	17	20	22	8	13	
19	Latvia	1	1	1	1	1	1	12	5	6
20	Romania	18	21	24	15	16	21	11	16	
21	Spain	14	13	20	9	19	14	20	21	
22	Hungary	12	17	10	20	15	13	10	10	1
23	Georgia	24	12	15	8	12	12	18	14	
24	Azerbaijan	25	14	22	24	26	25	22	25	
25	Russia	2	2	3	5	7	4	2	1	12
26	Albania	26	24	18	26	24	26	6	15	
27	Italy	23	15	21	11	17	18	1	8	3
