= Fahrenhaidt =

German band

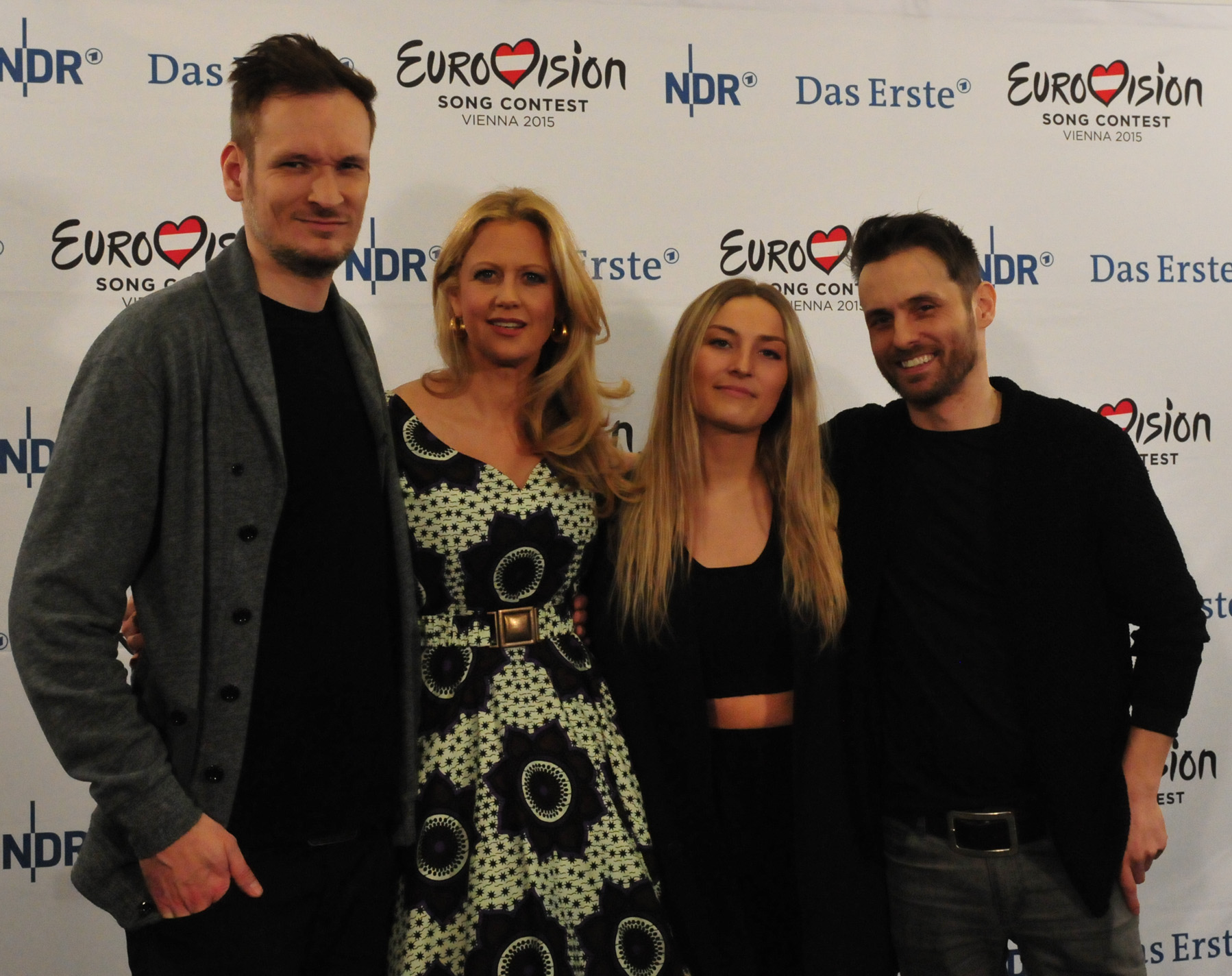

Background information
- Origin: Berlin, Germany
- Genres: Pop, new-age
- Years active: 2014 - present
- Labels: Electrola
- Members: Erik Macholl, Andreas John

Fahrenhaidt is a German band, with the main composers, producers, and band members being Erik Macholl and Andreas John. Its music is described as "modern nature-Pop".

== Career ==
The duo produced for many artists before they banded together, including Yvonne Catterfield, No Angels, Howard Carpendale, The Baseballs, Cassandra Steen and Betty Dittrich, under the name of JMC Music.

On 29 January 2015, they released their first single in collaboration with the Danish singer Amanda Pedersen, titled "Frozen Silence". A week later, on 6 February, they released their first album, The Book of Nature. The songs were performed by other artists, such as the German-Canadian-English singer Alice Merton and the Eurovision 2013 winner Emmelie de Forest.

Fahrenhaidt participated as contestants to represent Germany in the Eurovision Song Contest 2015 in Vienna, Austria. They had previously produced the song "Disappear" for Germany in the Eurovision Song Contest 2008. The two songs they chose were "Frozen Silence" and "Mother Earth". They were eliminated in the first round.

A second single, "Lights Will Guide Me", was used for the web campaign of the online game Echo of Soul.

== Discography ==
=== Albums ===
Year	Title	Peak chart positions		
Year	Title	GER	AUT	SWI
2015	The Book of Nature: Label: Electrola; Format: CD	17	55	89
2016	Home Under the Sky: Label: Electrola; Format: CD	36	—	—
