= Elaiza =

German band

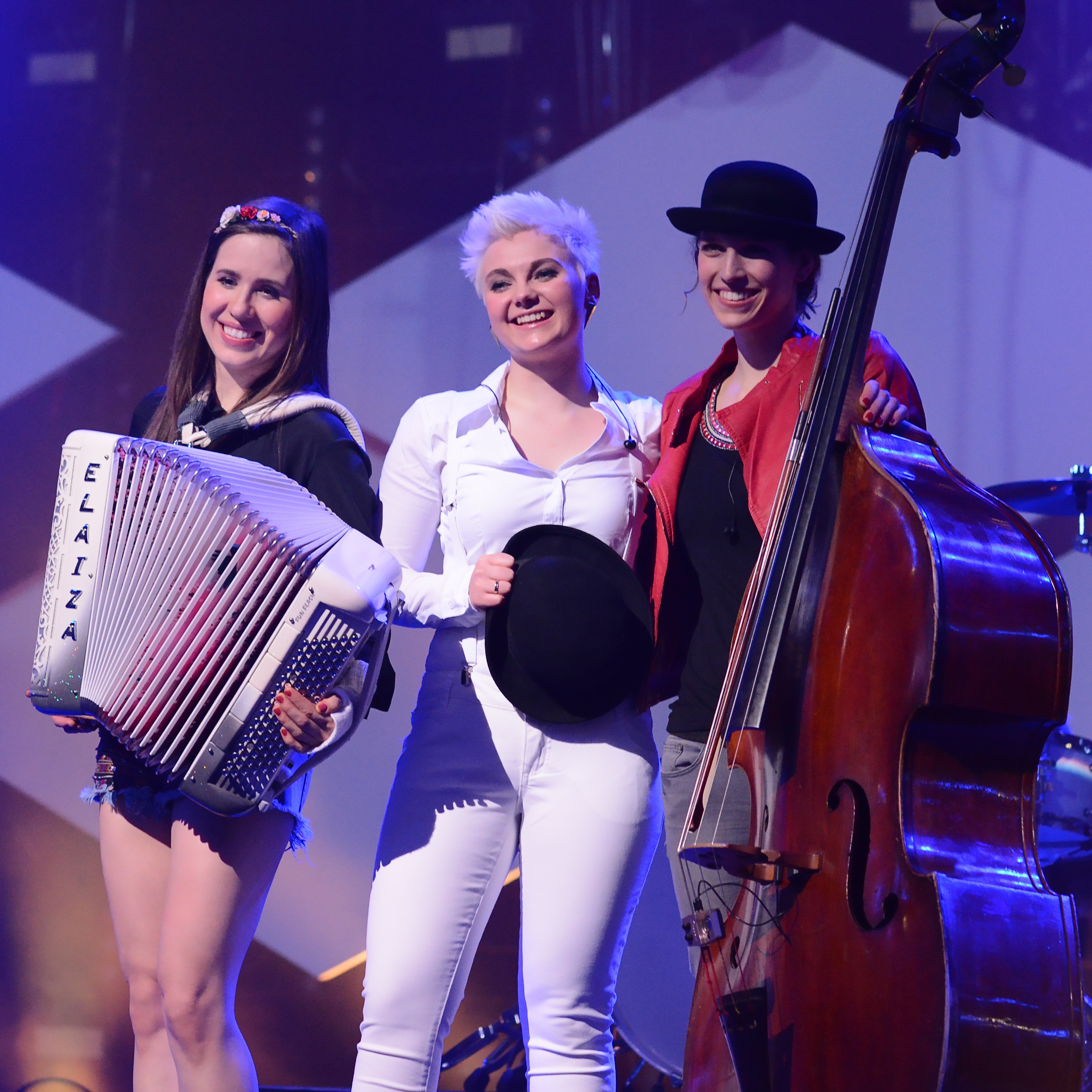

Background information
- Origin: Berlin, Germany
- Genres: Folk, indie, alternative
- Years active: 2013–present
- Members: Elżbieta "Ela" Steinmetz; Laura Zimmermann; Natalie Plöger
- Past members: Yvonne Grünwald (2013–2016)

Elaiza presenting themselves 2014.

Elaiza (German: [ɛlaˈiːza]) is a German band from Berlin that represented Germany at the Eurovision Song Contest 2014 in Copenhagen, Denmark, with their song "Is It Right". The leader of the group is Elżbieta "Ela" Steinmetz. She was born in Ukraine and is of mixed Polish and Ukrainian origin as her mother comes from Poland and her father is from Ukraine. This cultural background is reflected in the sound of her songs.

== Career ==
=== Early beginnings ===
At the age of 16 Steinmetz began to work as a singer-songwriter at Valicon-Studios, Berlin. At the recording studio she met accordionist Yvonne Grünwald. At some event Grünwald saw a photo of Natalie Plöger with her string bass, and Plöger was invited to play with them.

=== 2013: Formation ===
Early in 2013 the three women founded the band Elaiza. At Emil Berliner Studios Elaiza produced in March 2013 the LP "March 28" via direct-to-disk recording. The record was named after the date of recording and was published by the label Berliner Meister Schallplatten. Since then the band applied itself to the production of its debut album, which is in progress in collaboration with the Valicon-producer team at Berlin. In 2013 the band won the newcomer award at the famous Women-of-the-World-Festival. In January 2014 Elaiza released an EP with the songs Is It Right, Fight Against Myself and Without.

=== 2014–present: Eurovision Song Contest and Gallery ===
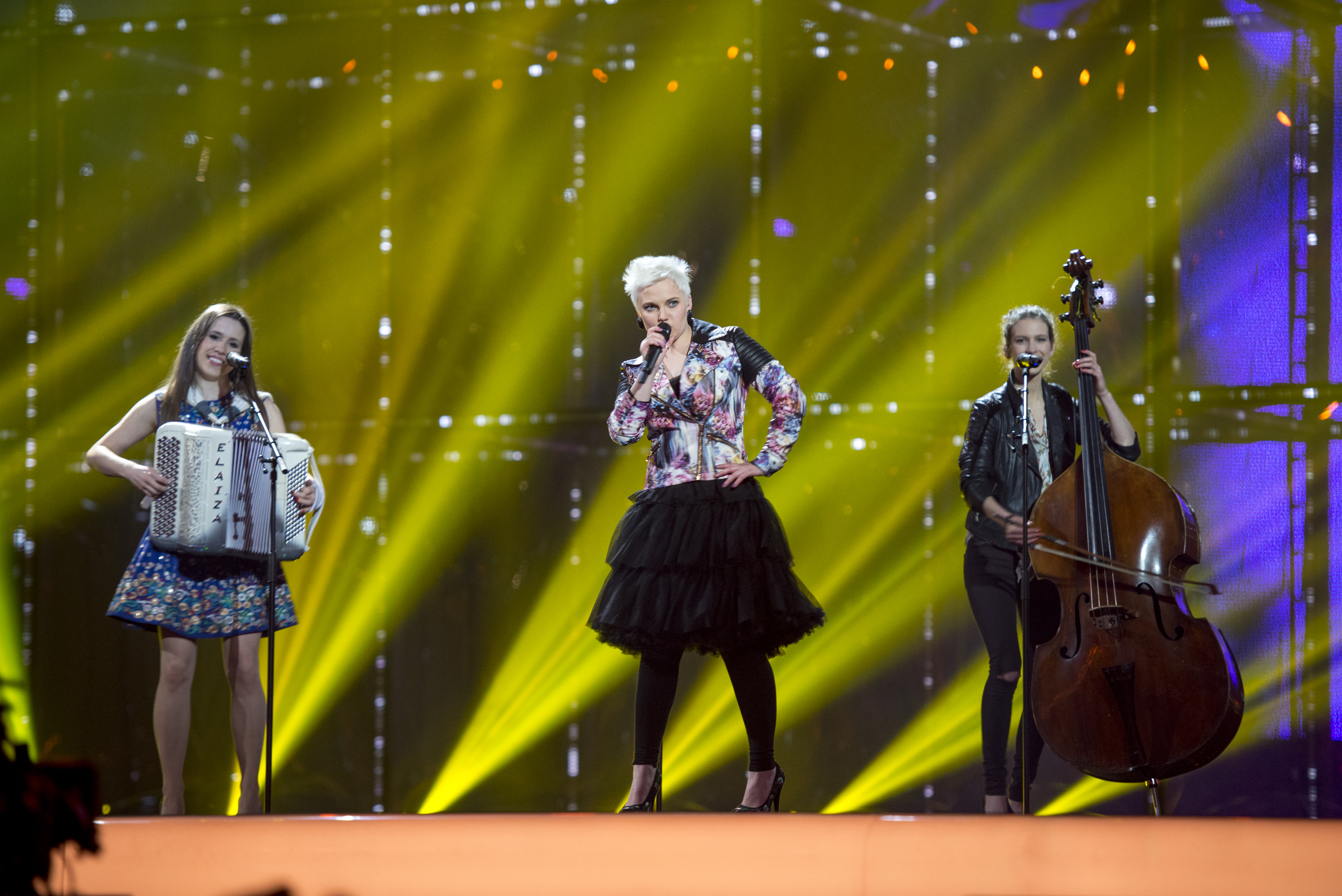
Elaiza at Eurovision Song Contest 2014

With their song Is It Right written together with Mesanic Music headwriter Adam Kesselhaut, Elaiza applied via YouTube for the so-called wild card for the German preselection, where the broadcaster had seeded seven acts. Elaiza were chosen to perform among the ten best entries at a club concert at Edelfettwerk, Hamburg. The trio won the televoting, which qualified them to start at the German preselection Unser Song für Dänemark on 13 March 2014 at Lanxess-Arena, Cologne, with seven other contenders. In the third and final round Elaiza won the televoting with 55 percent against the band Unheilig, which is very popular in Germany. On 28 March 2014 they released their debut studio album Gallery, it peaked at number 24 in Germany. Elaiza represented Germany at the Eurovision Song Contest on 10 May 2014 at Copenhagen.

== Members ==
- Elżbieta "Ela" Steinmetz (born 11 October 1992 in Smila, Ukraine) — vocals, piano
- Laura Zimmermann (born 8 April 1989 in Munich, Bavaria, West Germany – accordion, violin, backing vocals
- Natalie Plöger (born 3 September 1985 in Leer, Lower Saxony, West Germany) — string bass, backings
- Yvonne Grünwald (born 10 May in Salzwedel, Saxony-Anhalt, East Germany) — accordion, Glockenspiel, backing vocals. Grünwald left the band in August 2016 to pursue other music projects.

== Discography ==
=== Albums ===
Title	Details	Peak chart positions
Title	Details	GER
Gallery	Released: 28 March 2014; Label: Heart of Berlin; Format: Digital download, CD	24
Restless	Released: 6 May 2016; Label: Heart of Berlin; Format: Digital download, CD	92
Liebe & Krieg	Released: 14 February 2020; Label: Ariola; Format: Digital download, CD	87

=== Singles ===
Title	Year	Peak chart positions							Certifications	Album
Title	Year	GER	AUT	DEN	IRE	POL	SWI	UK	Certifications	Album
"Fight Against Myself"	2014	50	—	—	—	—	—	—		Gallery
"Is it Right"	2014	4	14	39	83	1	43	161	BVMI: Gold	Gallery
"I Don't Love You"	2014	—	—	—	—	—	—	—		Gallery
"Hurricane"	2016	—	—	—	—	—	—	—		Restless
"Real"	2016	—	—	—	—	—	—	—		Restless
"—" denotes single that did not chart or was not released in that territory.

=== Other charted songs ===
Title	Year	Peak chart positions	Album
Title	Year	GER	Album
"Without"	2014	88	Gallery

Awards and achievements
Preceded by Cascada with "Glorious"	Germany in the Eurovision Song Contest; 2014	Succeeded by Ann Sophie with "Black Smoke"
