= Alexa Feser =

German singer

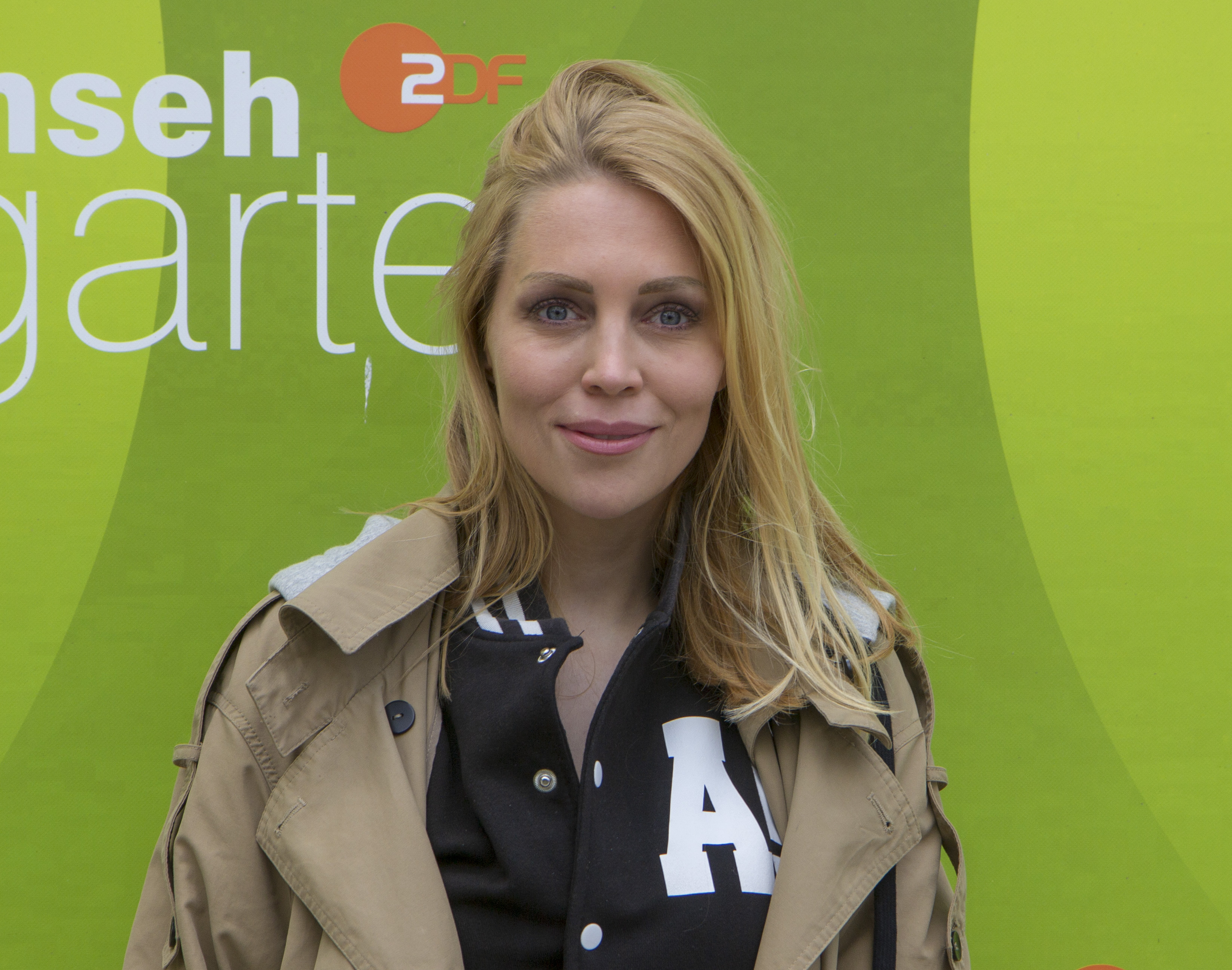
- Feser in 2019

Background information
- Also known as: Alexa Phazer
- Born: 30 December 1979 (age 46); Wiesbaden, West Germany
- Genres: Pop; R&B; pop rock
- Occupations: Singer, songwriter
- Instruments: Vocals, piano
- Years active: 2007–present

Alexa Feser (born 30 December 1979), sometimes credited as Alexa Phazer is a German singer and songwriter. She is best known for taking part in Unser Song für Österreich.

== Career ==
Feser was born in Wiesbaden and became interested in music at age four. She states that her grandfather, a jazz pianist is her biggest musical inspiration. She has worked as a backing singer for No Angels, Juliette Schoppmann, Joana Zimmer, Thomas Anders, Ricky Martin, and Mike Leon Grosch.

In January 2015, she was announced as one of the seven established artists taking part in Unser Song für Österreich. She competed with the songs "Glück" and "Das Gold von morgen". She passed round 1, after performing "Glück", but failed to qualify for round 3 with either of her songs.

== Discography ==
=== Albums ===
List of studio albums, with selected chart positions, sales figures and certifications
Title	Album details	Peak chart positions		
Title	Album details	GER	AUT	SWI
Ich gegen mich (as Alexa Phazer)	Released: 8 August 2008; Label: Sony Music; Format: CD, digital download	—	—	—
Gold von morgen	Released: 26 September 2014; Label: Warner Music; Format: CD, digital download	19	—	—
Zwischen den Sekunden	Released: 21 April 2017; Label: Warner Music; Format: CD, LP, digital download	3	27	34
A!	Released: 10 May 2019; Label: Warner Music; Format: CD, LP, Boxset, digital download	7	74	65
Liebe 404	Released: 4 February 2022; Label: Sony Music; Format: CD, Boxset, digital download	6	—	—
Kino	Released: 15 March 2024; Label: 1991TM; Format: CD, LP, Boxset, digital download	29	—	—

=== Singles ===
==== As lead artist ====
List of singles with selected chart positions
Title	Year	Peak chart positions		Album
Title	Year	GER	AUT	Album
"Ich heirate mich selbst"	2007	—	—	Ich gegen mich
"Hypnotisiert"	2008	—	—	Ich gegen mich
"Wir sind hier"	2014	—	—	Gold von morgen
"Glück"	2015	63	—	Gold von morgen
"Mehr als ein Lied"	2015	—	—	Gold von morgen
"Medizin"	2016	—	—	Zwischen den Sekunden
"Wunderfinder" (featuring Curse)	2017	—	62	Zwischen den Sekunden
"Leben"	2017	—	—	Zwischen den Sekunden
"Gold reden"	2018	—	—	A!
"Mut"	2018	—	—	A!
"Atari T-Shirt"	2019	—	—	A!
"Bei 10 wieder oben"	2019	—	—	A!
"1A"	2019	—	—	A!
"Tempelhofer Feld" (featuring Disarstar)	2019	—	—	A!
"Abgeholt"	2019	—	—	A!
"Optimist"	2020	—	—	Liebe 404
"Minibar"	2020	—	—	Liebe 404
"Einen"	2021	—	—	Liebe 404
"Fluchtwagen" (featuring Kool Savas)	2021	95	—	Liebe 404
"Air Max"	2021	—	—	Liebe 404
"Liebe 404" (featuring Sero)	2021	—	—	Liebe 404
"Aufstehmensch"	2022	—	—	Liebe 404
"Memo"	2022	—	—	Liebe 404
"Schiebedach" (featuring Esther Graf)	2022	—	—	Liebe 404
"Highscore"	2022	—	—	Kino
"Checkbox"	2023	—	—	Kino
"Lana Del Rey"	2023	—	—	Kino
"Mein Name ist"	2023	—	—	Kino
"Deine Freunde"	2023	—	—	Kino
"Fritten"	2023	—	—	Kino
"Kaiserschnitt" (featuring Ava Ion)	2024	—	—	Kino
"Anker"	2024	—	—	Kino
"—" denotes a recording that did not chart or was not released in that territory.

==== As featured artist ====
List of singles, with selected chart positions and certifications
Title	Year	Peak chart positions		Certifications	Album
Title	Year	GER	AUT	Certifications	Album
"Best of Us" (as part of Wier)	2020	78	—	BVMI: Gold	non-album singles
"8MilliardenHaus" (with DopeClass)	2022	—	—		non-album singles
"—" denotes a recording that did not chart or was not released in that territory.
