= The Voice of Germany season 3 =

The Voice of Germany
- Season 3
- Hosted by: Thore Schölermann; Doris Golpashin (V Reporter)
- Judges: Nena; Max Herre; Samu Haber; The BossHoss
- Winner: Andreas Kümmert
- Winning coach: Max Herre
- Runner-up: Chris Schummert

Release
- Original network: ProSieben and Sat.1
- Original release: October 17 – December 20, 2013

Season chronology
- ← Previous; Season 2 Next → Season 4

The Voice of Germany (season 3) is a German reality talent show that premiered on 17 October 2013 on ProSieben and Sat.1. Based on the reality singing competition The Voice of Holland, the series was created by Dutch television producer John de Mol. It is part of an international series. Xavier Naidoo and Rea Garvey have been replaced with Max Herre and Samu Haber, singer of the Finnish pop-rock band Sunrise Avenue. This season adopted the Knockout round as seen in the US version of The Voice.

On 20 December 2013, Andreas Kümmert was declared the winner of the season marking Max Herre's first and only win as a coach and the first new coach to win on his first attempt.

== Teams ==
- Winner
- Runner-up
- Third place
- Fourth place
- Eliminated in the Semi-final
- Eliminated in the Quarterfinal
- Eliminated in the Showdown round
- Stolen in the Battle rounds
- Eliminated in the Battle rounds

Coach	Top 76 Artists						
Nena							
Nena	Tiana Kruskic	Emily Instful	Nader Rahy	Laura Kattan	John Noville	Thorunn Egilsdottir	Lilith Wieland
Nena	Gentiana Merturi	Pascal Diederich	Norisha Campbell	David Hanselmann	Jonas Pütz	~~Anja Lerch~~	~~Isaac Roosevelt~~
Nena	~~Tal Ofarim~~	Astrid Lonergan	Katya Aujesky	Msoke Mhina	Georgina Mettbach	John Eid	
Max Herre							
Max Herre	Andreas Kümmert	Peer Richter	Violetta Kokollari	Katharina Schoofs	Jazz Akkar	Nico Gomez	Anja Lerch
Max Herre	Leon Rudolf	Annika Kron	Sara Koell	Karen Firlej	Isaac Roosevelt	~~Janine Hecht~~	~~Rasmus Hoffmeister~~
Max Herre	Marc Motzer	Cathrin Joksch	Nonhle Beryl	Hanna Iser	Larissa Evans	Ines Koch	
Samu Haber							
Samu Haber	Chris Schummert	Judith van Hel	Romina Amann	Yvonne Rüller	Tesirée Priti	Nilima Chowdhury	Rasmus Hoffmeister
Samu Haber	Joy Masala	Manuel Storz	Ashonte Lee	Sibell	Akina Ingold	~~Laura Kattan~~	Marco Musca
Samu Haber	Agatino Sciurti	Alex Radloff	Tabea Elkarra	Madlen Böhm	Margit Silay	Johny Fraser	
The BossHoss							
The BossHoss	Debbie Schippers	Caro Trischler	David Whitley	Anina Schibli	Tal Ofarim	Aalijah Tabatha Hahnemann	Janine Hecht
The BossHoss	Juri Rother	Albulena Krasniqi	Fredrik	Philip Bölter	Zsuzsa Magyar	~~Gentiana Merturi~~	~~Sara Koell~~
The BossHoss	~~Romina Amann~~	Lisette Whitter	Holger Brokmann	Mario Gegner	Hafdís Hallgrimsdóttir	Astrid "Chilli" Rusznyak	
Note: Italicized names are stolen artists (names struck through within former teams).

== The first phase: The Blind Auditions ==
Key	Coach hit his or her "I WANT YOU" button	Contestant eliminated with no coach pressing his or her "I WANT YOU" button	Contestant defaulted to this coach's team	Contestant elected to join this coach's team

=== Episode 1: October 17, 2013 ===
Order	Contestant	Song	Coaches' and Contestants' Choices			
Order	Contestant	Song	Nena	Max Herre	Samu Haber	The BossHoss
1	Nico Gomez	"Blurred Lines"				
2	Nilima Chowdhury	"Just Give Me a Reason"	—			—
3	Jonas Pütz	"Diamonds"		—		
4	Tümay Zoroğlu	"Don't You Worry Child"	—	—	—	—
5	Laura Kattan	"Clown"		—		—
6	Nader Rahy	"Plush"		—	—	
7	Albulena Krasniqi	"Impossible"	—	—	—	
8	Peer Richter	"Zu Dir (Weit Weg)"			—	—
9	Ashonte "Dolo" Lee	"Tears Always Win"				
10	Kathrin Breuer	"My Heart Is Refusing Me"	—	—	—	—
11	Debbie Schippers	"Brand New Me"	—	—		
12	Andreas Kümmert	"Rocket Man"				

=== Episode 2: October 18, 2013 ===
Order	Contestant	Song	Coaches' and Contestants' Choices			
Order	Contestant	Song	Nena	Max Herre	Samu Haber	The BossHoss
1	Katharina Schoofs	"Irgendwo Anders"				
2	Isaac Roosevelt	"Get Lucky"		—		—
3	Sina Rösener	"I'm Alive"	—	—	—	—
4	Larissa Evans	"Trouble"	—		—	—
5	Philip Bölter	"The Dreamer"		—		
6	Thorunn Egilsdóttir	"Winter"				
7	Hanna Iser	"Nobody's Fool"	—		—	
8	Norisha Campbell	"Why"		—	—	
9	Agatino Sciurti	"Love Me Again"	—	—		—
10	Tiana Kruškić	"Try"			—	—
11	Patrick Schober	"How We Do (Party)"	—	—	—	—
12	Anina Schibli	"Price of Love"	—	—	—	
13	Chris Schummert	"Pumped Up Kicks"		—		

=== Episode 3: October 24, 2013 ===
Order	Contestant	Song	Coaches' and Contestants' Choices			
Order	Contestant	Song	Nena	Max Herre	Samu Haber	The BossHoss
1	Tabea Elkarra	"Somehow"	—	—		
2	Katja Aujesky	"She Wolf (Falling To Pieces)"				
3	Mario Gegner	"Need You Now"	—	—		
4	Judith van Hel	"The Way I Tend To Be"	—	—		—
5	Fredrik	"1234"			—	
6	Menno Reyntjes	"Suit & Tie"	—	—	—	—
7	Joy Masala	"Here's to Never Growing Up"	—	—		
8	Pascal Diederich	"Mich kann nur Liebe retten"		—	—	—
9	Tesirée Priti	"The Other Side"	—	—		
10	Hafdís Hallgrimsdóttir	"Nothing Compares 2 U"	—	—	—	
11	Violeta Kokollari	"Wonder"	—			—
12	Gianni Meurer	"Beneath Your Beautiful"	—	—	—	—
13	David Whitley	"Freedom"				

=== Episode 4: October 25, 2013 ===
Order	Contestant	Song	Coaches' and Contestants' Choices			
Order	Contestant	Song	Nena	Max Herre	Samu Haber	The BossHoss
1	Marc Motzer	"Fine China"	—			
2	Emily Intsiful	"Give Me Love"			—	—
3	Astrid Chilli Rusznyak	"Kiss"	—	—		
4	Annika Kron	"Never Forget You"				
5	Sibell	"I Can't Stand the Rain"	—	—		—
6	Burkhardt Eiben	"Accidentally in Love"	—	—	—	—
7	Lilith Wieland	"Lego House"		—	—	—
8	Madlen Böhm	"Don't Stop the Music"	—	—		—
9	David Hanselmann	"Let's Stay Together"		—	—	—
10	Rasmus Hoffmeister	"Mit jedem deiner Fehler"			—	—
11	Romina Amann	"Wild"		—	—	
12	Marco Musca	"Come Home"	—	—		—
13	Aalijah Tabatha Hahnemann	"My Baby Left Me"				
14	Margit Silay	"Sleeping Satellite"	—	—		—
15	Sarah Ego	"Come & Get It"	—	—	—	—

=== Episode 5: October 31, 2013 ===
Order	Contestant	Song	Coaches' and Contestants' Choices			
Order	Contestant	Song	Nena	Max Herre	Samu Haber	The BossHoss
1	Akina Ingold	"The Last Day on Earth"		—		—
2	Tal Ofarim	"Hello World"		—	—	—
3	Yvonne Rüller	"Under"	—	—		—
4	Caro Trischler	"Last Request"	—	—	—	
5	Ron van Lankeren	"It's a Beautiful Day"	—	—	—	—
6	Cathrin Joksch	"I Can't Make You Love Me"				—
7	Leon Rudolf	"Counting Stars"	—		—	
8	Gentiana Merturi	"R.I.P."		—	—	
9	Msoke Mhina	"I Need a Dollar"			—	—
10	Janine Hecht	"And I Am Telling You I'm Not Going"	—			—
11	Jannik Ridiger	"Another Love"	—	—	—	—
12	Anja Lerch	"Both Sides, Now"		—	—	—
13	Manuel Storz	"Who Did That To You?"	—	—		—
14	Lisette Whitter	"Teach Me How to Be Loved"	—	—	—	
15	Yasemin "Jazz" Akkar	"If I Ain't Got You"				

=== Episode 6: November 1, 2013 ===
Order	Contestant	Song	Coaches' and Contestants' Choices			
Order	Contestant	Song	Nena	Max Herre	Samu Haber	The BossHoss
1	Holger Brokmann	"Army of Two"				
2	Alex Radloff	"I Feed You My Love"	—	—		—
3	Ines Koch	"Me and Mrs. Jones"	—			—
4	John Noville	"This Time"		—	—	—
5	Alina Neichel	"Love Ain't Gonna Let You Down"	—	—	—	—
6	Karen Firlej	"Good Luck"	—			—
7	Georgina Mettbach	"Love You I Do"		—	—	—
8	Juri Rother	"Higher Love"	—	—	—	
9	Sarah Koell	"Where I Come From"		—		
10	Clare Sheridan	"Tangled Up"	—	—	—	—
11	Zsuzsa Magyar	"This Ain't Goodbye"		—	—	
12	Johny Fraser	"Maybe Tomorrow"	—	—		—
13	Astrid Lonergan	"Chasing Pavements"		—	—	—
14	John Eid	"Nie vergessen"		—	—	—
15	Nonhle Beryl	"Mr. Know It All"	—		—	

== The second phase: The Battle Rounds ==
For this first time, this series will see the Steal Deal where eliminated contestants can be stolen by other coaches.

Key
– Coach hit his/her "I WANT YOU" button
– Artist defaulted to this coaches team
– Artist elected to join this coaches team
– Battle winner
– Battle loser
- Battle loser but was saved by another coach

=== Episode 7: November 7, 2013 ===
Order	Coach	Artist			Song	Coaches and artists choices			
Order	Coach	Artist			Song	Nena	Max Herre	Samu Haber	The BossHoss
1	Max Herre	Janine Hecht	Andreas Kümmert	—N/a	"To Love Somebody"		—N/a	—	
2	Samu Haber	Ashonte Lee	Marco Musca	Tesirée Priti	"All the Right Moves"	—	—	—N/a	—
3	The BossHoss	Lisette Whitter	Anina Schibli	—N/a	"Stay"	—	—	—	—N/a
4	Nena	John Noville	Anja Lerch	—N/a	"All Along the Watchtower"	—N/a		—	—
5	Samu Haber	Chris Schummert	Agatino Sciurti	—N/a	"Follow Me"	—	—	—N/a	—
6	Nena	Tiana Kruškić	Astrid Lonergan	—N/a	"Mercedes Benz"	—N/a	—	—	—
7	The BossHoss	Debbie Schippers	Aalijah Tabitha Hahnemann	Romina Amann	"Black Cat"	—	—		—N/a

=== Episode 8: November 8, 2013 ===
Order	Coach	Artist			Song	Coaches and artists choices			
Order	Coach	Artist			Song	Nena	Max Herre	Samu Haber	The BossHoss
1	Max Herre	Nico Gomez	Marc Motzer	—N/a	"Blame It on the Boogie"	—	—N/a	—	—
2	The BossHoss	Caro Trischler	Sara Koell	—N/a	"Thinking of You"			—	—N/a
3	Samu Haber	Sibell	Alex Radloff	Judith van Hel	"Wherever You Will Go"	—	—	—N/a	—
4	Nena	David Hanselmann	Katja Aujesky	—N/a	"Over the Rainbow"	—N/a	—	—	—
5	Samu Haber	Yvonne Rüller	Tabea Elkarra	—N/a	"Ironic"	—	—	—N/a	—
6	The BossHoss	Fredrik	Holger Brokmann	—N/a	"Lonely Boy"	—	—	—	—N/a
7	Max Herre	Katharina Schoofs	Cathrin Joksch	—N/a	"Ohne Dich"	—	—N/a	—	—
8	Nena	Isaac Roosevelt	Emily Intsiful	Jonas Pütz	"Nights in White Satin"	—N/a		—	—

=== Episode 9: November 14, 2013 ===
Order	Coach	Artist			Song	Coaches and artists choices			
Order	Coach	Artist			Song	Nena	Max Herre	Samu Haber	The BossHoss
1	Max Herre	Leon Rudolf	Rasmus Hoffmeister	Peer Richter	"Zu schnell vorbei"	—	—N/a		—
2	Nena	Msoke Mhina	Lilith Wieland	—N/a	"La La La"	—N/a	—	—	—
3	Samu Haber	Nilima Chowdhury	Madlen Böhm	—N/a	"Lights"	—	—	—N/a	—
4	The BossHoss	Mario Gegner	Philip Bölter	—N/a	"I Will Wait"	—	—	—	—N/a
5	Max Herre	Nonhle Beryl	Yasemin "Jazz" Akkar	—N/a	"Love on Top"	—	—N/a	—	—
6	Samu Haber	Joy Masala	Margit Silay	—N/a	"You Know I'm No Good"	—	—	—N/a	—
7	The BossHoss	David Whitley	Hafdís Hallgrimsdóttir	—N/a	"Treasure"	—	—	—	—N/a
8	Nena	Tal Ofarim	Thorunn Egilsdóttir	Nader Rahy	"Kiss from a Rose"	—N/a	—	—	

=== Episode 10: November 15, 2013 ===
Order	Coach	Artist			Song	Coaches and artists choices			
Order	Coach	Artist			Song	Nena	Max Herre	Samu Haber	The BossHoss
1	The BossHoss	Albulena Krasniqi	Zsuzsa Magyar	Gentiana Merturi	"Sweet Nothing"		—	—	—N/a
2	Samu Haber	Johny Fraser	Manuel Storz	—N/a	"Hall of Fame"	—	—	—N/a	—
3	Max Herre	Violeta Kokollari	Hanna Iser	—N/a	"Sleep"	—	—N/a	—	—
4	Nena	Georgina Mettbach	Norisha Campbell	—N/a	"Sign o' the Times"	—N/a	—	—	—
5	Max Herre	Karen Firlej	Larissa Evans	—N/a	"La La La"	—	—N/a	—	—
6	The BossHoss	Astrid "Chilli" Rusznyak	Juri Rother	—N/a	"Next to Me"	—	—	—	—N/a
7	Max Herre	Ines Koch	Annika Kron	—N/a	"Wake Me Up"	—	—N/a	—	—
8	Nena	John Eid	Pascal Diederich	—N/a	"Weil das morgen noch so ist"	—N/a	—	—	—
9	Samu Haber	Akina Ingold	Laura Kattan	—N/a	"Wings"		—	—N/a	—

== The third phase: The Showdown Round ==
Two contestants sing an individual song and the coach decides which contestant will advance to the Live Shows.

Color key:

Artist won the showdown and advances to the Live shows
Artist lost the showdown and was eliminated

=== Episode 11: November 21, 2013 ===
Coach	Order	Song	Artists		Song
Nena	1	"All the Man That I Need"	Norisha Campbell	Laura Kattan	"Against All Odds (Take a Look at Me Now)"
BossHoss	2	"Alive"	Tal Ofarim	Philip Bölter	"Come Together"
Samu	3	"Work It Out"	Sibell	Tesirée Priti	"Firework"
Max	4	"Superstition"	Nico Gomez	Isaac Roosevelt	"A Real Mother for You"
BossHoss	5	"One Life"	Janine Hecht	Debbie Schippers	"Don't Stop"
Max	6	"Little Lion Man"	Leon Rudolf	Peer Richter	"Ich Will Nur"
Nena	7	"Please Sister"	Þorunn Egilsdóttir	Jonas Pütz	"Shoulda"
Samu	8	"Soul's On Fire"	Ashonte Lee	Yvonne Rüller	"Heartbeat"

=== Episode 12: November 22, 2013 ===
Coach	Order	Song	Artists		Song
BossHoss	1	"Soulmate"	Aalijah Tabatha Hahnemann	Zsuzsa Magyar	"Don't Let Go (Love)"
Nena	2	"Papa Was a Rollin' Stone"	David Hanselmann	John Noville	"No Woman, No Cry"
Max	3	"You Got the Love"	Katharina Schoofs	Sara Koell	"Sex on Fire"
Samu	4	"Fast Car"	Chris Schummert	Rasmus Hoffmeister	"Kraniche"
Nena	5	"No More Drama"	Gentiana Merturi	Emily Intsiful	"Home"
Samu	6	"Red"	Joy Masala	Judith van Hel	"The First Cut Is the Deepest"
Max	7	"Talkin' 'bout a Revolution"	Violeta Kokollari	Annika Kron	"One and Only"
BossHoss	8	"A Song for You"	David Whitley	Albulena Krasniqi	"Nobody's Perfect"

=== Episode 13: November 28, 2013 ===
Coach	Order	Song	Artists		Song
BossHoss	1	"Walking in Memphis"	Juri Rother	Caro Trischler	"I Knew You Were Trouble"
Max	2	"Heaven"	Jazz Akkar	Karen Firlej	"Thinkin Bout You"
Nena	3	"Bei meiner Seele"	Pascal Diederich	Nader Rahy	"Nutshell"
Samu	4	"We Found Love"	Akina Ingold	Nilima Chowdhury	"Autumn Leaves"
BossHoss	5	"Personal Jesus"	Fredrik	Anina Schibli	"Hard Knocks"
Nena	6	"Tears Dry on Their Own"	Lilith Wieland	Tiana Kruskic	"Proud Mary"
Samu	7	"Save Room"	Manuel Storz	Romina Amman	"Nasty Naughty Boy"
Max	8	"I'd Rather Go Blind"	Anja Lerch	Andreas Kümmert	"A Whiter Shade of Pale"

== The fourth phase: The Live shows ==
The live shows started on 29 November 2013 and concluded with the Final on 20 December 2013. All Live shows were broadcast on Sat.1. In the first two live shows the six remaining contestants of every team were split in groups of three. After all the contestants in each group had sung their individual songs, the responsible coach had to award 20, 30 & 50 points to these contestants. After this a televoting had been held, which made up 50% of voting. The contestant with the most points advanced to final.

In the Semifinal and Final the coach didn't vote and only the public decided who will advance and win The voice of Germany 2013.

=== Episode 14: November 29, 2013 ===
Voting #	Coach	Candidate	Song	Total Points		
Voting #	Coach	Candidate	Song	Coach	Public	Total
1.	Samu Haber	Tesirée Priti	"Wrecking Ball"	30	13,0	43,0
1.	Samu Haber	Judith van Hel	"The Power of Love"	50	73,9	123,9
1.	Samu Haber	Nilima Chowdhury	"Symphonie"	20	13,1	33,1
2.	The BossHoss	David Whitley	"When Love Takes Over"	30	33,0	63,0
2.	The BossHoss	Anina Schibli	"Seven Nation Army"	20	21,7	41,7
2.	The BossHoss	Debbie Schippers	"Nobody Knows"	50	45,3	95,3
3.	Nena	Nader Rahy	"Kashmir"	30	36,7	66,7
3.	Nena	Laura Kattan	"Sunrise"	20	24,7	44,7
3.	Nena	Tiana Kruskic	"Bad"	50	38,6	88,6
4.	Max Herre	Violeta Kokollari	"Strong"	30	9,0	39,0
4.	Max Herre	Katharina Schoofs	"Meine Worte"	20	4,8	24,8
4.	Max Herre	Andreas Kümmert	"If You Don't Know Me by Now"	50	86,2	136,2

Non-competition performances
Order	Performers	Song
14.1	Ivy Quainoo ft. Top 12 Liveshow #1	"Atomic"
14.2	Team Nena (Nena, Nader Rahy, Laura Kattan, Tiana Kruskic, John Noville, Emily Intsiful & Thorunn Egilsdottir)	"Solange Du Dir Sorgen machst"
14.3	Sunrise Avenue	"Live Saver"

=== Episode 15: December 6, 2013 ===
Voting #	Coach	Candidate	Song	Total Points		
Voting #	Coach	Candidate	Song	Coach	Public	Total
1.	The BossHoss	Tal Ofarim	"A Thousand Years"	30	41,2	71,2
1.	The BossHoss	Aalijah Tabatha Hahnemann	"Roar"	20	11,2	31,2
1.	The BossHoss	Caro Trischler	"The Boys of Summer"	50	47,5	97,5
2.	Samu Haber	Romina Amman	"Sway"	20	15,3	35,3
2.	Samu Haber	Chris Schummert	"Hey Brother"	50	65,9	115,9
2.	Samu Haber	Yvonne Rüller	"Weak"	30	18,8	47,8
3.	Max Herre	Jazz Akkar	"Umbrella"	30	14,1	44,1
3.	Max Herre	Nico Gomez	"LoveStoned"	20	33,7	53,7
3.	Max Herre	Peer Richter	"Sie sieht mich nicht"	50	52,2	102,2
4.	Nena	John Noville	"Wonderful Life"	20	13,7	33,7
4.	Nena	Emily Intsiful	"Walzer für Niemand"	50	40,4	90,4
4.	Nena	Thorunn Egilsdottir	"The Scientist"	30	45,9	75,9

Non-competition performances
Order	Performers	Song
15.1	Blue Man Group ft. Top 12 Liveshow #2	"Applause"
15.2	OneRepublic ft. Top 12 Liveshow #2	"Counting Stars"
15.3	Nick Howard ft. Judith van Hel, Debbie Schippers, Tiana Kruskic & Andreas Kümmert	"Untouchable"
15.4	The BossHoss	"Do it"

=== Episode 16 (Semifinal): December 13, 2013 ===
The semifinal saw the introduction of "The Cross-Battles". Two contestant of different teams sing an individual song. The contestant with the most public votes advances to the final. After the announcement of the finalist, the winning contestant sang his winning song. All songs, also the ones which were not presented live, were released on iTunes. Every download counted as two phone calls from the public in the final voting.

Sing- duell	Coach	Candidate	Song	Televote (in %)	Winning Single of Finalist
1.	Max Herre	Peer Richter	"Unter die Haut"	28,7	—
1.	Samu Haber	Chris Schummert	"Every Breath You Take"	71,3	"The Singer"
2.	Samu Haber	Judith van Hel	"Chasing Cars"	73,1	"Fucking Beautiful"
2.	Nena	Emily Intsiful	"Hey Jude"	26,9	—
3.	Nena	Tiana Kruskic	"Ja Nisam Tu"	42,3	—
3.	The BossHoss	Debbie Schippers	"With or Without You"	57,7	"Skin and Bones"
4.	The BossHoss	Caro Trischler	"Your Song"	21,1	—
4.	Max Herre	Andreas Kümmert	"With a Little Help from My Friends"	78,9	"Simple Man"

Non-competition performances
Order	Performers	Song
15.1	Katy Perry ft. Peer Richter, Chris Schummert, Debbie Schippers & Caro Trischler	"Unconditionally"
15.2	Katy Perry	"Dark Horse"
15.3	Michael Bublé ft. Judith van Hel, Emily Intsiful, Tiana Kruskic & Andreas Kümmert	"After All"
15.4	Max Herre ft. Joy Denalane & Gentleman	"Tabula Rasa" & "A-N-N-A"

=== Episode 17 (Final): December 20, 2013 ===
Rang #	Coach	Contestant	Songs		Televoting and Downloads in %
1.	Max Herre	Andreas Kümmert	Winner Single	"Simple Man"	47,44
1.	Max Herre	Andreas Kümmert	Duet with Coach	"So Wundervoll"	47,44
1.	Max Herre	Andreas Kümmert	Duet with Guest Artist	"Nothing's Real but Love" with Rebecca Ferguson	47,44
2.	Samu Haber	Chris Schummert	Winner Single	"The Singer"	27,54
2.	Samu Haber	Chris Schummert	Duet with Coach	"Faith"	27,54
2.	Samu Haber	Chris Schummert	Duet with Guest Artist	"Bonfire Heart" with James Blunt	27,54
3.	Samu Haber	Judith van Hel	Winner Single	"Fucking Beautiful"	17,51
3.	Samu Haber	Judith van Hel	Duet with Coach	"Enjoy The Silence"	17,51
3.	Samu Haber	Judith van Hel	Duet with Guest Artist	"Another Love" with Tom Odell	17,51
4.	The BossHoss	Debbie Schippers	Winner Single	"Skin And Bones"	7,51
4.	The BossHoss	Debbie Schippers	Duet with Coach	"Are You Gonna Go My Way"	7,51
4.	The BossHoss	Debbie Schippers	Duet with Guest Artist	"Burn" with Ellie Goulding	7,51

== Elimination Chart ==
=== Overall ===
Color key
Artist's info

- Artist from Team Samu Haber
- Artist from Team TheBossHoss
- Artist from Team Max Herre
- Artist from Team Nena

Result details

- Winner
- Runner-up
- Third place
- Fourth place
- Artist was saved
- Artist was eliminated
- Artist did not perform on that particular week

Live show results per week
Artist	Week 1	Week 2	Week 3	Finals
Andreas Kümmert	Safe		Safe	Winner
Chris Schummert		Safe	Safe	Runner-Up
Judith van Hel	Safe		Safe	3rd Place
Debbie Schippers	Safe		Safe	4th Place
Tiana Kruskic	Safe		Eliminated	Eliminated (Week 3)
Peer Richter		Safe	Eliminated	Eliminated (Week 3)
Emily Intsiful		Safe	Eliminated	Eliminated (Week 3)
Caro Trischler		Safe	Eliminated	Eliminated (Week 3)
Thorunn Egilsdottir		Eliminated	Eliminated (Week 2)	
Tal Ofarim		Eliminated	Eliminated (Week 2)	
Nico Gomez		Eliminated	Eliminated (Week 2)	
Yvonne Rciller		Eliminated	Eliminated (Week 2)	
Jazz Akkar		Eliminated	Eliminated (Week 2)	
Romina Amman		Eliminated	Eliminated (Week 2)	
John Noville		Eliminated	Eliminated (Week 2)	
Aalijah Tabatha Hahnemann		Eliminated	Eliminated (Week 2)	
Nader Rahy	Eliminated	Eliminated (Week 1)		
David Whitley	Eliminated	Eliminated (Week 1)		
Laura Kattan	Eliminated	Eliminated (Week 1)		
Tesirée Priti	Eliminated	Eliminated (Week 1)		
Anina Schibli	Eliminated	Eliminated (Week 1)		
Violeta Kokollari	Eliminated	Eliminated (Week 1)		
Nilima Chowdhury	Eliminated	Eliminated (Week 1)		
Katharina Schoofs	Eliminated	Eliminated (Week 1)		

== Ratings ==
Episode	Date	Viewers		Market share		Source
Episode	Date	Total	14 to 49 years	Total	14 to 49 years	Source
Blind Audition 1	17 October 2013	4.03 Mio.	2.73 Mio.	13.5%	24.1%	
Blind Audition 2	18 October 2013	4.57 Mio.	2.80 Mio.	15.2%	25.9%	
Blind Audition 3	24 October 2013	4.16 Mio.	2.89 Mio.	13.7%	23.8%	
Blind Audition 4	25 October 2013	4.12 Mio.	2.54 Mio.	14.0%	23.7%	
Blind Audition 5	31 October 2013	3.77 Mio.	2.44 Mio.	13.0%	23.1%	
Blind Audition 6	1 November 2013	4.13 Mio.	2.63 Mio.	13.1%	22.6%	
Battles 1	7 November 2013	4.08 Mio.	2.77 Mio.	13.3%	23.4%	
Battles 2	8 November 2013	4.06 Mio.	2.60 Mio.	13.1%	23.9%	
Battles 3	14 November 2013	3.44 Mio.	2.38 Mio.	11.0%	19.4%	
Battles 4	15 November 2013	3.15 Mio.	1.93 Mio.	10.2%	16.6%	
Showdown 1	21 November 2013	3.51 Mio.	2.39 Mio.	11.2%	20.2%	
Showdown 2	22 November 2013	3.34 Mio.	2.06 Mio.	11.0%	18.2%	
Showdown 3	28 November 2013	3.12 Mio.	2.01 Mio.	11.0%	16.8%	
Liveshow 1	29 November 2013	2.99 Mio.	1.71 Mio.	10.9%	17.3%	
Liveshow 2	6 December 2013	2.80 Mio.	1.68 Mio.	10.6%	16.5%	
Semifinal	13 December 2013	2.72 Mio.	1.63 Mio.	9.7%	16.3%	
Final	20 December 2013	3.60 Mio.	2.32 Mio.	12.5%	19.8%	
