= Laing (band) =

German band

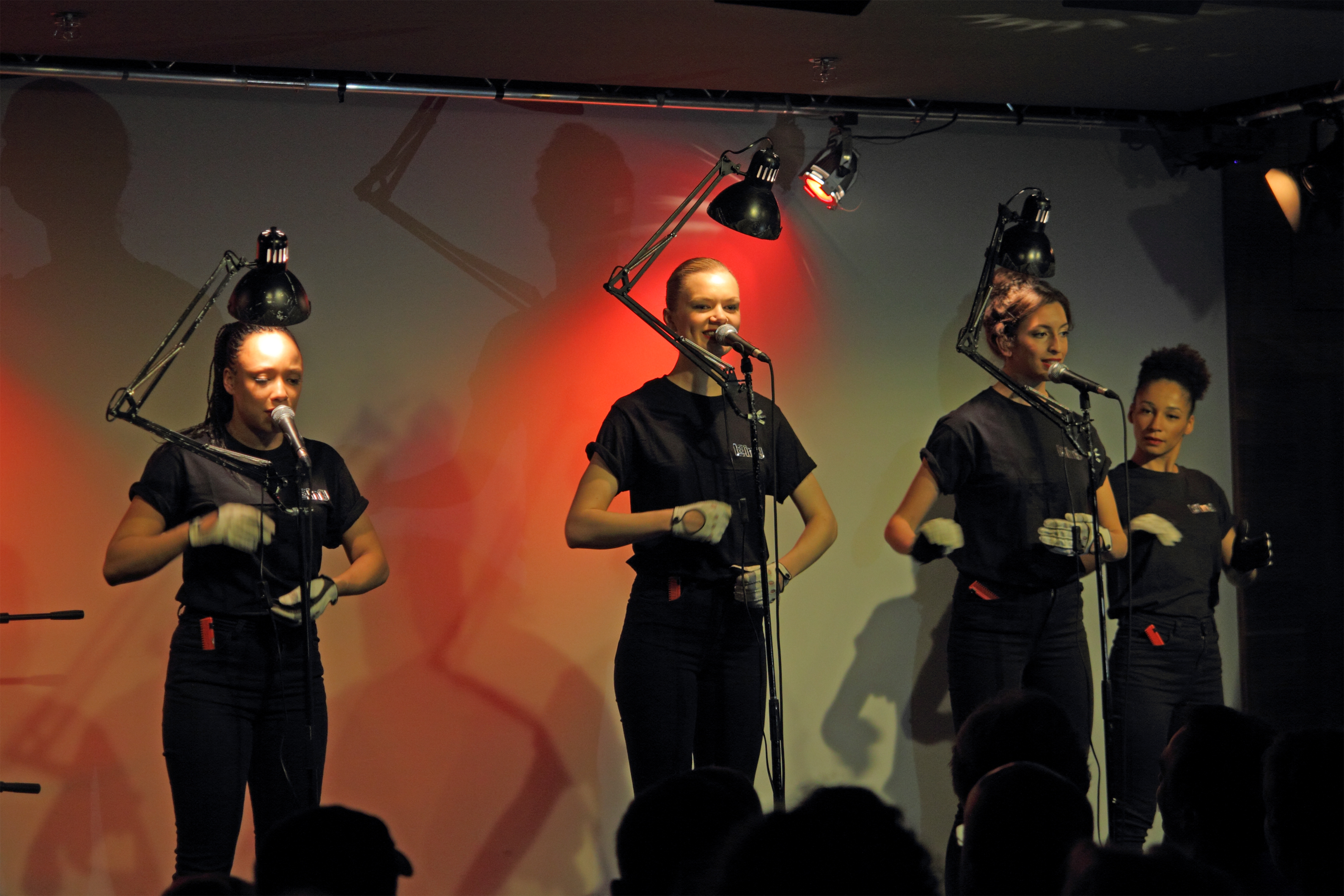
- Laing performing in 2013

Background information
- Origin: Berlin, Germany
- Genres: Electropop; Electroclash; soul; alternative dance
- Years active: 2007–present
- Labels: Universal Music Germany
- Members: Nicola Rost; Josefine Werner; Johanna Marshall; Marisa Akeny
- Past members: Susanna Berivan; Atina Tabé; Larissa Pesch; Ben Lauber

Laing is a German band currently consisting of Nicola Rost, Josefine Werner, Johanna Marshall, and Marisa Akeny.

== Career ==
Laing was founded in 2007 by lead vocalist, songwriter, and producer Nicola Rost, vocalists Johanna Marshall and Larissa Pesch, and dancer Marisa Akeny. The group's name comes from the surname of Rost's adoptive mother. Their breakthrough came in 2012 when they represented Saxony in the 2012 Bundesvision Song Contest with the song "Morgens immer müde". They placed second and the song went on to reach the Top 10 and Top 50 in the German and Austrian charts, respectively. They competed in Unser song für Österreich with the songs "Zeig deine Muskeln" and "Wechselt die Beleuchtung". The group qualified to the Top 4, but did not make it to the Top 2 and were eliminated.

== Members ==
The founding members of Laing consist of lead vocalist Nicola Rost, vocalists Johanna Marshall and Susanna Berivan, and dancer Marisa Akeny. In 2012, Berivan left the group in favour of a solo career and was replaced by Atina Tabé. Tabé later left the group as well in 2014 and was replaced by Larissa Pesch.

== Discography ==
=== Studio albums ===
List of studio albums, with selected chart positions, sales figures and certifications
Title	Album details	Peak chart positions
Title	Album details	AT
Paradies Naiv	Released: 15 March 2013; Label: Universal Music Germany	75
Wechselt die Beleuchtung	Released: 12 September 2014; Label: Universal Music Germany	—
Fotogena	Released: 7 September 2018; Label: Universal Music Germany	—

=== EPs ===
- 030 / 577 07 886 (2011)
- Sehnsucht (2011)
- Morgens immer müde (2012)

=== Singles ===
List of singles as main artist, with selected chart positions and certifications
Title	Year	Peak chart positions	Certifications
Title	Year	AT	Certifications
"Neue Liebe"	2011	—	
"Sehnsucht"	2011	—	
"Morgens immer müde"	2012	49	
"Nacht für nacht"	2012	—	
"Paradies Naiv"	2013	—	
"Mit Zucker"	2013	—	
"Safari"	2014	—	
"Zeig deine Muskeln"	2015	—	
