= Noize Generation =

Electronic dance music producer and DJ

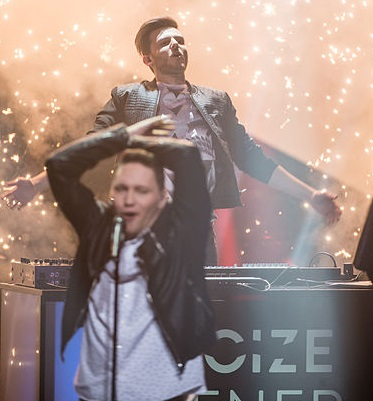
Jewgeni Grischbowski in 2015

Jewgeni Grischbowski (born 20 July 1992), better known by his stage name Noize Generation, is a Ukrainian-German music producer and DJ based in Germany.

== Background ==
Noize Generation was born Jewgeni Grischbowski in 1992 in Zhytomyr, Ukraine. He also has Russian and Polish roots. He made his first musical steps as a drummer in an Alternative Rock-Band. Grischbowski's interest in producing electronic music was piqued after hearing Justice and The Bloody Beetroots. He began producing and composing his own songs at the age of 16. He gained recognition with his remixes of Dare and Feel Good Inc for the band Gorillaz, which both have peaked in the Top 3 on the music platform The Hype Machine. Afterwards he released several remixes for artists like Skrillex, Iggy Azalea and Route 94. He has also started touring as a DJ and has played in shows all over Germany and globally, including South Korea, Portugal, Italy, Sweden, Austria, Switzerland and Ukraine. On some of them he has shared the stage with DJs like Martin Garrix, Dimitri Vegas & Like Mike, R3hab and many more. In July 2014, it was confirmed that he signed a record deal with Universal Music. After that he made an unofficial remix for OneRepublic's single Love Runs Out, which attained big popularity and gained one million plays on SoundCloud and YouTube in a very short time. His first official single A Song for You was released on the 27 January 2015 and featured the Swedish singer Patrik Jean. A Song for You was already supported on some German radio stations before the official release.
