= Frank Kretschmer =

East German slalom canoeist

Medal record

Men's canoe slalom

Representing East Germany

World Championships
Bronze medal – third place	1977 Spittal	C-2

Frank Kretschmer is a former East German slalom canoeist who competed in the mid-to-late 1970s. He won a bronze medal in the C-2 event at the 1977 ICF Canoe Slalom World Championships in Spittal.
