= Is It Right =

2014 song by Elaiza

"Is it Right"

Single by Elaiza

from the album Gallery
- Released: 28 February 2014
- Genre: Neofolk
- Length: 3:54 (album version); 3:00 (single version)
- Label: Heart of Berlin
- Songwriters: Elżbieta Steinmetz; Frank Kretschmer; Adam Kesselhaut
- Producers: Ingo Politz; Frank Kretschmer

Elaiza singles chronology
"Fight Against Myself" (2014)	"Is it Right" (2014)	"I Don't Love You" (2014)

Music video
- "Is It Right" on YouTube

Eurovision Song Contest 2014 entry
- Country: Germany
- Artist: Elaiza
- Language: English
- Composers: Elżbieta Steinmetz; Frank Kretschmer
- Lyricists: Elżbieta Steinmetz; Adam Kesselhaut

Finals performance
- Final result: 18th
- Final points: 39

Entry chronology
- ◄ "Glorious" (2013)
- "Black Smoke" (2015) ►

Song presentation
- file; help

Official performance video
- "Is It Right" (Final) on YouTube

"Is it Right" is a song by German band Elaiza. Written by Elżbieta Steinmetz, Frank Kretschmer, and Adam Kesselhaut, it was released in Germany on 28 February 2014 as the lead single from their debut studio album Gallery (2014). It represented Germany at the Eurovision Song Contest 2014 in Denmark, where it finished in 18th place. Commercially, "Is it Right" went to number 1 in Poland, number 4 in Germany and number 14 in Austria.

== Music video ==
A music video to accompany the release of "Is it Right" was first released onto YouTube on 27 April 2014 at a total length of three minutes and fifty-two seconds. The video shows Elaiza performing in a white room while a mime acts out the song's lyrics.

== Track listing ==
Digital download
No.	Title	Length
1.	"Is It Right"	3:54
2.	"Fight Against Myself"	3:26
3.	"Without" (Live At Emil Berliner Studios)	4:22
4.	"Fight Against Myself" (Music video)	3:26

== Charts ==
=== Weekly charts ===
Weekly chart performance for "Is It Right"
Chart (2014)	Peak positions
Austria (Ö3 Austria Top 40)	14
Denmark (Tracklisten)	39
Germany (GfK)	4
Germany (Official Airplay Chart)	1
Ireland (IRMA)	83
Poland (Polish Airplay Top 100)	1
Switzerland (Schweizer Hitparade)	43
UK Singles (OCC)	161

=== Year-end charts ===
Chart (2014)	Position
Brazil (Antena 1 Radio)	18
Germany (Official German Charts)	46
Poland (ZPAV)	29

== Certifications ==
Certifications for "Is It Right"
Region	Certification	Certified units/sales
Germany (BVMI)	Gold	150,000^{^}
^{^} Shipments figures based on certification alone.

== Release history ==
Release dates and formats for "Is It Right"
Region	Date	Format	Label	Ref.
Germany	28 February 2014	digital download	Heart of Berlin	

== See also ==
- Germany in the Eurovision Song Contest 2014
