= Eo TV =

eo TV
- Country: Germany
- Broadcast area: Germany, Austria, Switzerland
- Headquarters: Munich, Germany

Programming
- Language: German
- Picture format: 576i (16:9 SDTV); 1080i (HDTV)

History
- Launched: 22 December 2015; 10 years ago
- Closed: 19 June 2021; 4 years ago
- Replaced by: More Than Sports TV

Links
- Website: www.eotv.de

Availability

Streaming media
- Magine TV (Germany): -
- waipu.tv (Germany): -
- Zattoo (Germany): -

eo TV (European Originals Television) was a German TV station based in Munich. It showed a mixture of European television series, feature films, classics and first releases on free TV. Since 22 December 2015 the program window of eo TV was broadcast daily from 20:15 h to 01:00 h on the TV channel RiC, a branch channel of Your Family Entertainment.

The independent television program in Germany, Austria and Switzerland will be distributed over all broadcast channels of RiC. The station reaches more than 32 million households in Germany, Austria and Switzerland.

eo TV was developed by Jürgen Hörner, the former head of ProSiebenSat.1.

== Distribution ==
Broadcasting of its own 24/7 service started on the German IPTV platform waipu.tv in December 2016, followed by Zattoo in July 2017 and the satellite service via Astra 1KR started on August 15, 2017.

== Programming ==
- A Young Doctor's Notebook (2016–present)
- Anna Karenina (2017–present)
- Ashes to Ashes (Ashes to Ashes - Zurück in die 80er) (2016–present)
- Big Man (Jack Clementi - Anruf genügt/Il Professore) (2016–present)
- Cranford (2016–present)
- D'Artagnan et les Trois Mousquetaires (2005) (Die drei Musketiere) (2016–present)
- Gran Hotel (2017–present)
- Inspector Rex (Kommissar Rex/Il Commissario Rex) (2016–present)
- Jane Eyre (2016–present)
- La piovra (Allein gegen die Mafia) (2016–present)
- La Scalata (Auf Messers Schneide) (2016–present)
- Lark Rise to Candleford (Von Lark Rise nach Candleford) (2016–present)
- Life on Mars (Life on Mars - Gefangen in den 70ern) (2016–present)
- Mistresses (Aus Lust und Leidenschaft) (2016–present)
- Mustat lesket (Black Widows - Rache auf Finnisch) (2016–present)
- Pod Prikritie (Undercover) (2016–present)
- Romanzo Criminale (2016–present)
- Rome (2016–present)
- The Bletchley Circle (2015–present)
- The Driver (2015–present)
- The Enid Blyton Adventure Series (Enid Blyton Abenteuer) (2017–present)
- The Enid Blyton Secret Series (Enid Blyton - Die verwegenen Vier) (2017–present)
- The Hunger (2016–present)
- The Legend of William Tell (Tell - Im Kampf gegen Lord Xax) (2017–present)
- Turbo (Mein Partner auf vier Pfoten) (2016–present)
- Versailles (2017–present)
