= Andreas Kümmert =

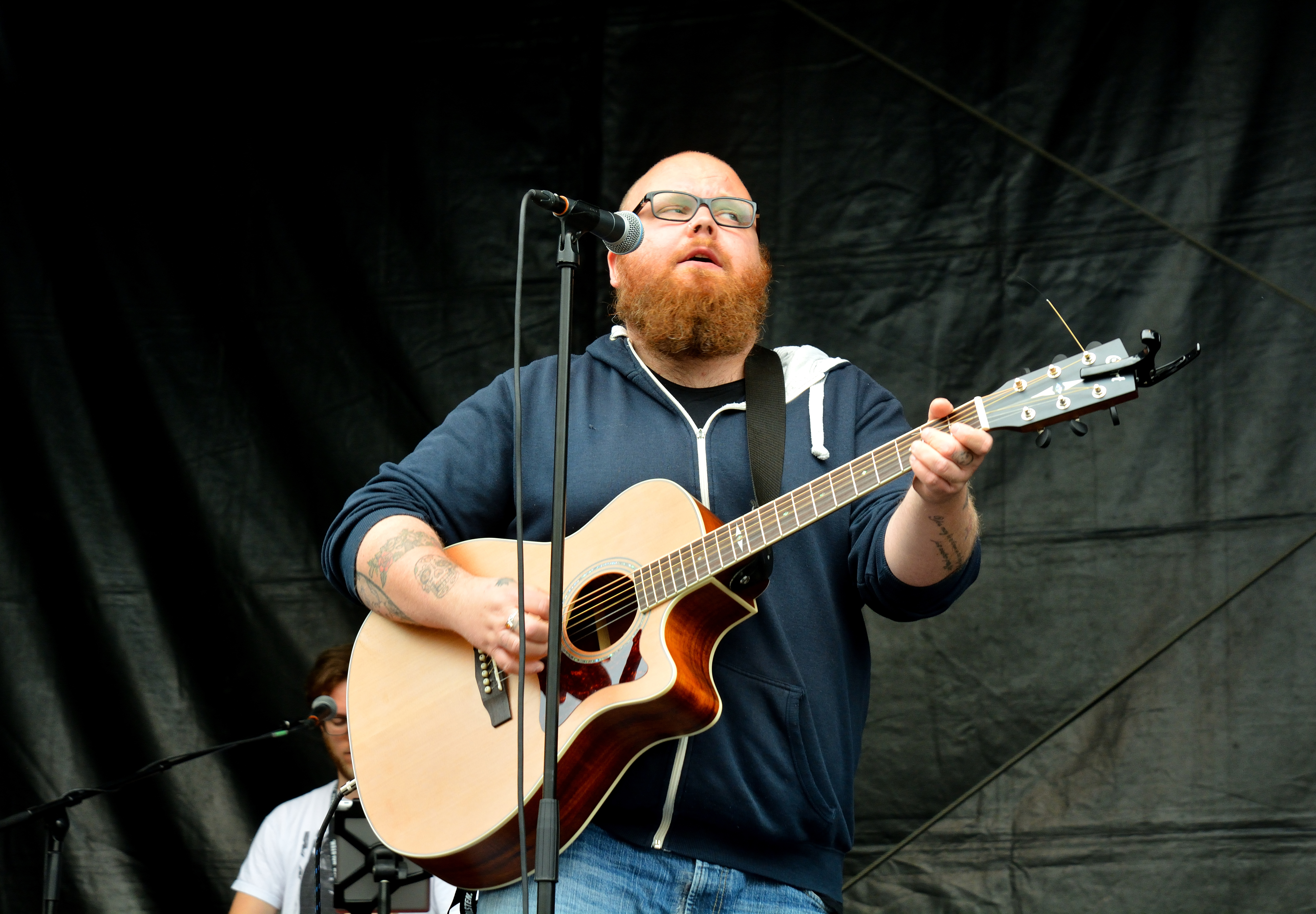

Background information
- Born: 20 July 1986 (age 40); Gemünden am Main, Bavaria, West Germany
- Genres: Rock; blues rock; folk rock; pop rock
- Occupations: Singer; songwriter
- Instruments: Vocals; guitar; drums
- Years active: 2002–present

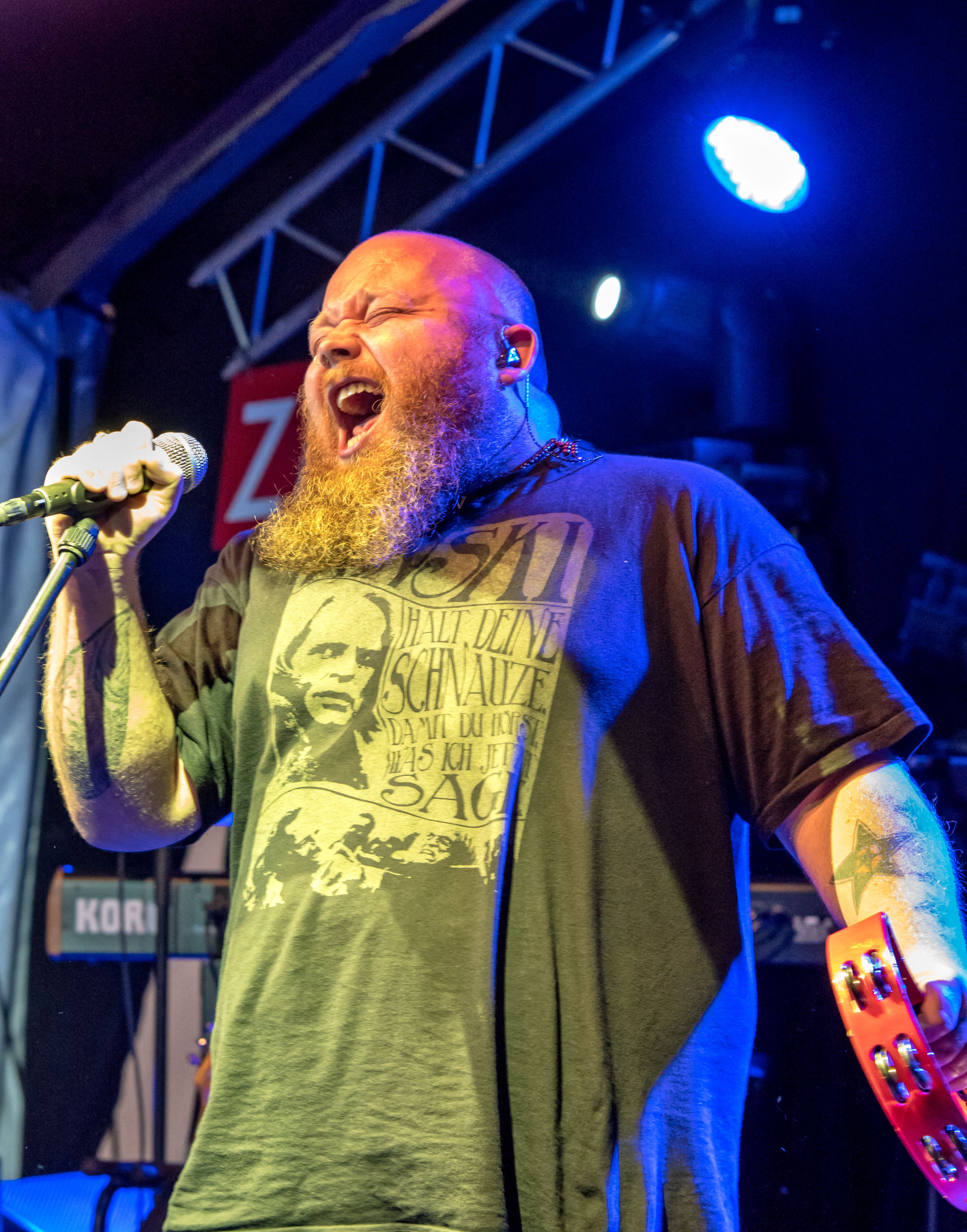
Zelt-Musik-Festival 2016 in Freiburg, Germany

Andreas Kümmert (born 20 July 1986) is a German singer and songwriter who is best known for winning season three of The Voice of Germany. He also won Unser Song für Deutschland with the song "Heart of Stone", giving him the possibility to represent his country at the Eurovision Song Contest 2015. However, he declined the opportunity and the runner-up Ann Sophie took his place.

== Career ==
Kümmert started his career playing the drums or singing in various punk rock bands throughout Germany. He achieved minor success in music competitions while performing with the grunge band Silent Cry. In 2013, Kümmert began to participate in season three of The Voice of Germany. Several of the songs he covered throughout the competition went on to chart in Germany, Austria, and Switzerland. Kümmert later won the competition. He later released his début album The Mad Hatter's Neighbour in 2014 which reached the Top 20 in Germany. In January 2015, Kümmert was announced as one of the seven established German artists competing in Unser Song für Deutschland with the songs "Home Is In My Hands" and "Heart of Stone". The latter of the two was announced as the winner of the competition and thus would represent Germany at the Eurovision Song Contest 2015, however he declined the opportunity and Ann Sophie and her song "Black Smoke" went on to represent the country in the contest, which got joint last place with nul points.

== Discography ==
=== Albums ===
List of studio albums, with selected chart positions, sales figures and certifications
Year	Title	Peak chart positions		
Year	Title	DE	AT	CH
2014	The Mad Hatter's Neighbour	14	46	93
2014	Here I Am	3	13	13
2016	Recovery Case	22	—	—
2018	Lost and Found	41	—	—

=== Singles ===
List of singles as main artist, with selected chart positions and certifications
Title	Year	Peak chart positions		
Title	Year	DE	AT	CH
"If You Don't Know Me by Now"	2013	44	58	59
"Simple Man"	2013	2	10	8
"Home Is In My Hands"	2015	51	—	—
"Heart of Stone"	2015	12	36	—

Awards and achievements
Preceded by Nick Howard	The Voice of Germany Winner; 2013	Succeeded by Charley Ann Schmutzler
