= Black Smoke (song) =

2015 song by Ann Sophie

Single by Ann Sophie

from the album Silver Into Gold
- Released: 2 March 2015
- Recorded: 2014
- Length: 3:12
- Label: Polydor; Island
- Songwriters: Michael Harwood; Ella McMahon; Tonino Speciale
- Producers: Mathias Ramson; Johannes Schmalenbach; Brix

Ann Sophie singles chronology
"Jump the Gun" (2015)	"Black Smoke" (2015)	"Tornado" (2019)

Audio sample
- file; help

Eurovision Song Contest 2015 entry
- Country: Germany
- Artist: Ann Sophie
- Language: English
- Composers: Michael Harwood; Ella McMahon; Tonino Speciale
- Lyricists: Michael Harwood; Ella McMahon; Tonino Speciale

Finals performance
- Final result: 27th
- Final points: 0

Entry chronology
- ◄ "Is It Right" (2014)
- "Ghost" (2016) ►

"Black Smoke" is a song performed by German singer Ann Sophie. The song represented Germany in the Eurovision Song Contest 2015, receiving zero points. Despite "Heart of Stone" by Andreas Kümmert being the original winner of the selection show Unser Song für Österreich, Kümmert decided to withdraw himself just when he was announced as the winner and therefore Ann Sophie and "Black Smoke" were chosen to represent the country. The song was co-written by British singer Ella Eyre. Black Smoke became the third German entry to get zero points at Eurovision, and the first one since Ulla Wiesner with "Paradies, wo bist du?" in 1965, 50 years earlier.

== Background and release ==
After Ann Sophie was selected as the wildcard for the final of Unser Song für Österreich, "Black Smoke" was announced as her second song for the final. A snippet of one minute of the song was revealed on 27 February 2015. The song was available for download on 2 March 2015, a few days before the selection.

== Composition and development ==
"Black Smoke" is a soul song with pop and jazz influences which runs for three minutes and twelve seconds. The song is written and composed by British singer Ella McMahon (better known as Ella Eyre), Michael Harwood and Tonino Speciale.

As said by Ann Sophie during an interview, the song is about "love, dating, what you have". It is a break-up song, talking about two people who have been in a relationship, do not recognize each other and "can't say three words".

== Critical reception ==
The song has received mostly positive reviews. With five reviews from Wiwibloggs, "Black Smoke" received an average score of 7 out of 10. Louis gave the song 7 out of 10 and said that it is "a solid song" and "really fun to listen to with lots of energy". Max, who also gave it 7 out of 10, said that the song is way better than Sophie's first song "Jump the Gun" and that is "calm, cool and emits a vibe that would appeal to the masses". He also said that it sounds like "an English version Nina Zilli's rejections". Mikhail and Patrick both gave it 9 out of 10 with the first saying that the song has "all the attitude of “Jump the Gun”, but tripled" while Patrick said that Sophie's voice is strong and the melody of the song is special. Lastly, Robyn gave the song 7 out of 10 and described the song as a "straight-up pop song".

Despite these positive reviews, the song finished tied for last at Eurovision, receiving 0 points.

== Live performances ==
The song was performed for the first time during the final of Unser Song für Österreich, the German national final for the Eurovision Song Contest 2015 in Vienna, Austria. It was performed three times during the final: twice when Ann Sophie qualified to the second and third rounds and once after she was selected to represent the country. Sophie performed the song during the final of the Eurovision Song Contest, receiving zero points. Although the host nation, Austria, also failed to score, and although the final scoreboard during transmission showed that "Black Smoke" was ranked in 26th place, the ranking was reviewed after the contest, and the tie-break rule - which states that the first song to perform should be ranked higher - resulted in its demotion to last (27th) place.

== Credits and personnel ==
- Ella McMahon – writing
- Michael Harwood – writing
- Ann Sophie – vocals
- Tonino Speciale – writing
- Mathias Ramson – producer
- Johannes Schmalenbach – producer
- Brix – producer

== Chart performance ==
Chart performance for "Black Smoke"
Chart (2015)	Peak position
Austria (Ö3 Austria Top 40)	54
Germany (GfK)	26

== Release history ==
Release history and formats for "Black Smoke"
Region	Date	Format	Label
Germany	2 March 2015	Digital download	Polydor; Island
