= Bennigsen (disambiguation) =

Bennigsen is a settlement, part of the town of Springe in Lower Saxony, Germany.

Bennigsen may also refer to:

== People ==
- Alexander Levin von Bennigsen (1809–1893), German politician
- Alexandre Bennigsen (1913–1988), scholar of Islam in the Soviet Union
- August von Bennigsen (1765–1815), Hanoverian officer
- Avenir Bennigsen (1912–??), Soviet intelligence officer
- Karl von Bennigsen (1789–1869), Hanoverian major general
- Levin August von Bennigsen (1745–1826), Russian general
- Ray Bennigsen (1902-1986), American sports business executive who served as president of the Chicago Cardinals
- Rudolf von Bennigsen (1824–1902), German politician
- Rudolf von Bennigsen (governor) (1859–1912), German colonial politician

== Other ==
- Bennigsen Beavers, German baseball and softball team based in Bennigsen
