= 2016 in German television =

This is a list of German television related events from 2016.

== Events ==
- 25 February - The Voice of Germany season 5 winner Jamie-Lee Kriewitz is selected to represent Germany at the 2016 Eurovision Song Contest with her song "Ghost". She is selected to be the sixty-first German Eurovision entry during Unser Lied für Stockholm held at the Brainpool Studios in Cologne.
- 25 March - 13-year-old Lukas Janisch wins the fourth season of The Voice Kids.

== Debuts ==
=== International ===
- 7 August - (United States) The Cleveland Show (2009–2013) (Comedy Central)

=== American Forces Network ===
- (United States) The Loud House (2016–present) (AFN Family)

== Television shows ==
=== 1950s ===
- Tagesschau (1952–present)

=== 1960s ===
- heute (1963–present)

=== 1970s ===
- heute-journal (1978–present)
- Tagesthemen (1978–present)

=== 1980s ===
- Lindenstraße (1985–present)

=== 1990s ===
- Gute Zeiten, schlechte Zeiten (1992–present)
- Unter uns (1994–present)
- Schloss Einstein (1998–present)
- In aller Freundschaft (1998–present)
- Wer wird Millionär? (1999–present)

=== 2000s ===
- Deutschland sucht den Superstar (2002–present)
- Let's Dance (2006–present)
- Das Supertalent (2007–present)

=== 2010s ===
- The Voice of Germany (2011–present)
- Promi Big Brother (2013–present)

== Networks and services ==
=== Launches ===
Network	Type	Launch date	Notes	Source
RTL International	Cable television	18 January		
RTLplus	Cable television	4 June		
Animax Germany	Cable television	1 July		
Zee One	Cable and satellite	28 July		
Kabel eins Doku	Cable television	22 September		
Sky One	Cable television	3 November		

=== Conversions and rebrandings ===
Old network name	New network name	Type	Conversion Date	Notes	Source
TNT Glitz	TNT Comedy	Cable television	1 June		
EinsFestival	One	Cable television	3 September		
Sony Entertainment Television	Sony Channel	Cable television	Unknown		

=== Closures ===
Network	Type	End date	Notes	Sources
EinsPlus	Cable television	30 September		
ZDFkultur	Cable television	30 September		

== Deaths ==
Date	Name	Age	Cinematic Credibility
22 February	Margit Geissler-Rothemund	57	German actress

== See also ==
- 2016 in Germany
