= 2016 in television =

2016 in television may refer to

- 2016 in American television for television-related events in the United States.
- 2016 in Australian television for television-related events in Australia.
- 2016 in Belgian television for television-related events in Belgium.
- 2016 in Brazilian television for television-related events in Brazil.
- 2016 in British television for television-related events in the United Kingdom.
  - 2016 in Scottish television for television-related events in Scotland.
- 2016 in Canadian television for television-related events in Canada.
- 2016 in Croatian television for television-related events in Croatia.
- 2016 in Danish television for television-related events in Denmark.
- 2016 in Dutch television for television-related events in the Netherlands.
- 2016 in Estonian television for television-related events in Estonia.
- 2016 in French television for television-related events in France.
- 2016 in German television for television-related events in Germany.
- 2016 in Indian television for television-related events in India.
- 2016 in Irish television for television-related events in the Republic of Ireland.
- 2016 in Italian television for television-related events in Italy.
- 2016 in Japanese television for television-related events in Japan.
- 2016 in Mexican television for television-related events in Mexico.
- 2016 in Norwegian television for television-related events in Norway.
- 2016 in Pakistani television for television-related events in Pakistan.
- 2016 in Philippine television for television-related events in the Philippines.
- 2016 in Polish television for television-related events in Poland.
- 2016 in Portuguese television for television-related events in Portugal.
- 2016 in South African television for television-related events in South Africa.
- 2016 in South Korean television for television-related events in South Korea.
- 2016 in Spanish television for television-related events in Spain.
- 2016 in Swedish television for television-related events in Sweden.
- 2016 in Turkish television for television-related events in Turkey.
