= Jamie-Lee Kriewitz =

German pop singer

Jamie-Lee
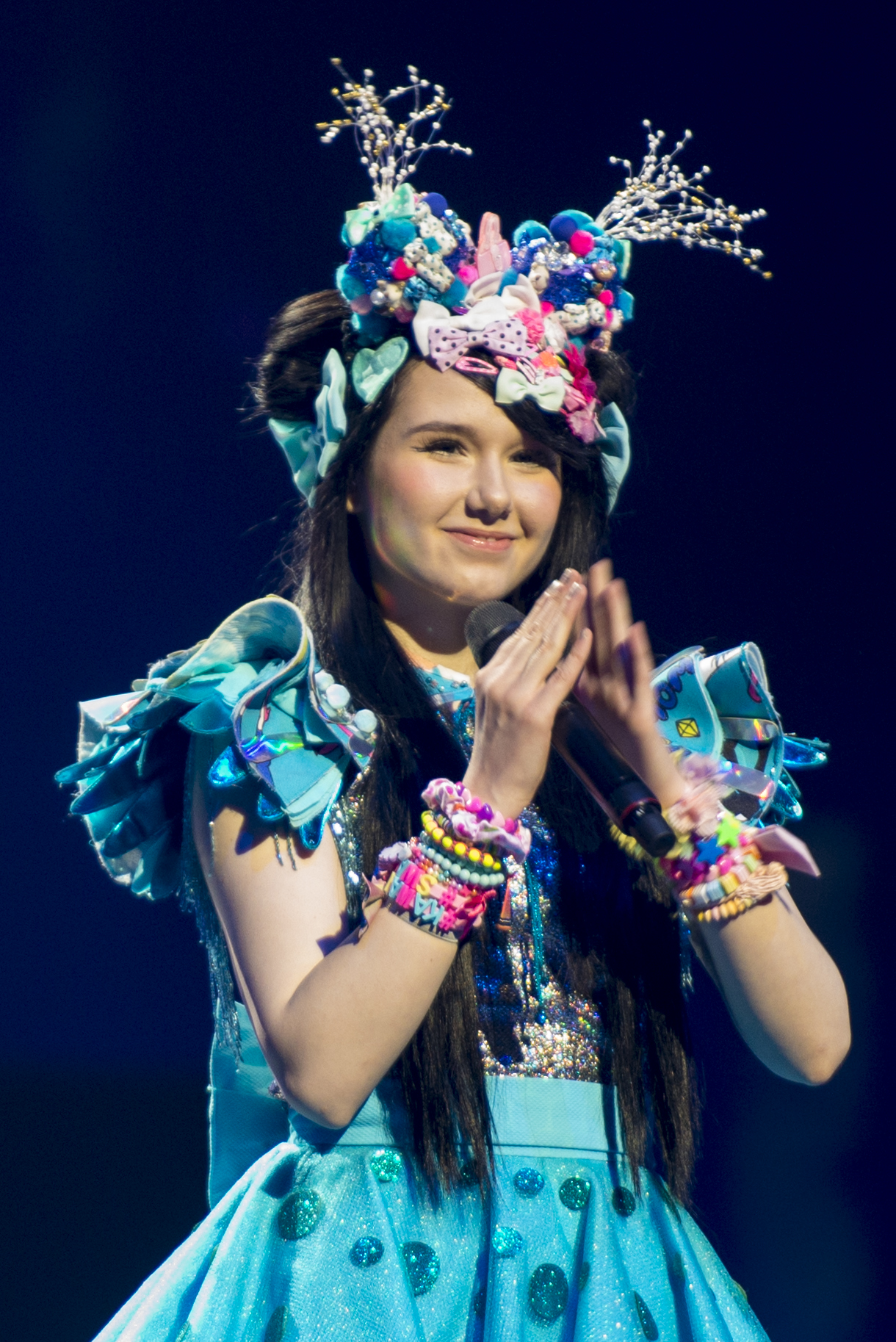
- Kriewitz in 2016

Background information
- Born: Jamie-Lee Kriewitz; 18 March 1998 (age 28); Bennigsen, Hanover, Germany
- Genre: Pop
- Occupation: Singer
- Years active: 2015–present
- Label: Universal Music Group
- Website: jamie-lee.eu

Jamie-Lee Kriewitz (pronounced [kʁiːvɪt͡s]; born 18 March 1998), better known as Jamie-Lee, is a German pop singer. Born and raised in Bennigsen, Hanover, she (Note: Kriewitz uses both she/her and they/them pronouns. This article uses she/her for consistency.) performed as a member of the children choir Joyful Noise before auditioning for the fifth season of The Voice of Germany in 2015. She competed as one of the seventeen composing members of Team Michi & Smudo and later emerged as the winner after garnering 38% of the public vote. Kriewitz's debut and winner's single, "Ghost", peaked at number 11 on the GfK Entertainment Charts, number 65 in the Ö3 Austria Top 40 and number 26 on the Swiss Hitparade. She subsequently signed a recording contract with Universal Music Group; her debut studio album Berlin was released on 29 April 2016 and peaked at number 18 on the GfK Entertainment Charts.

Following Xavier Naidoo's disqualification, Kriewitz was announced as one of the ten finalists for Unser Lied für Stockholm, Germany's preliminary decision for their representative at the Eurovision Song Contest 2016, in 2016. She competed with her debut and winner's single "Ghost" and later emerged as the winner after garnering 44.5% of the public vote. Kriewitz then represented Germany in the Eurovision Song Contest 2016, where she placed twenty-sixth in the final, scoring 11 points: 10 points from the televoting and 1 point from the juries. Her placement became Germany's second consecutive time at last place since Lena's win with her song "Satellite" in 2010, the first being Ann Sophie with her song "Black Smoke", whom placed twenty-seventh and scored zero points in 2015.

== Life and career ==
=== 1998–2015: Early life and career ===
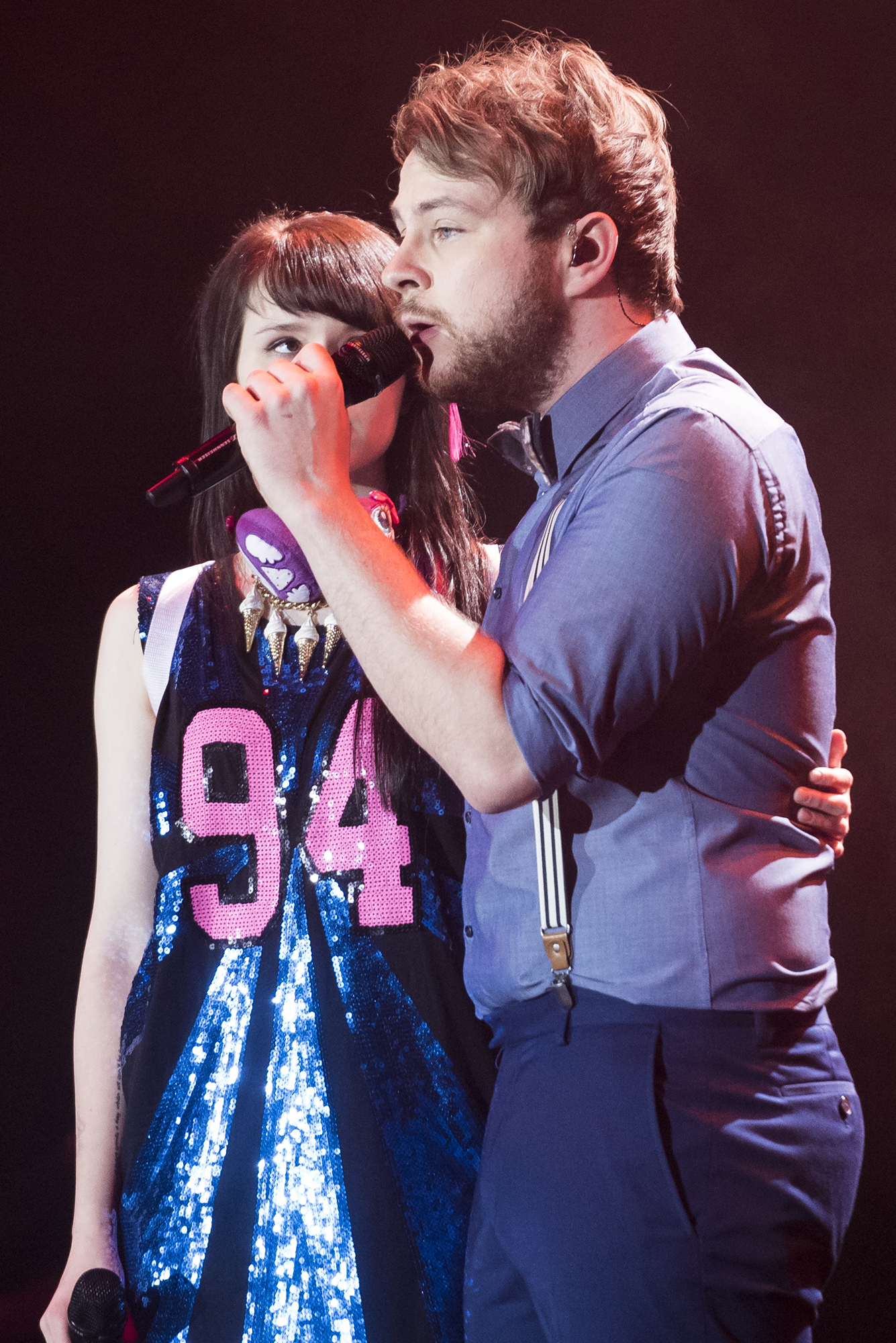
Kriewitz (left) and Ayke Witt (right) performing during The Voice of Germany: Live in Concert.

Jamie-Lee Kriewitz was born in Bennigsen, Hanover on 18 March 1998 to Michael Kriewitz, a former drummer for the German punk rock band 3Zylinder, and Nicole Kriewitz. She has an older brother named Joey. At the age of 12, Kriewitz became a member of the German children choir Joyful Noise. At the age of 14, she became a vegan. Kriewitz originally intended to pursue a degree in Korean studies before deciding to pursue a career as a musician.

In 2015, Kriewitz successfully auditioned for the fifth season of The Voice of Germany, singing "The Hanging Tree" by James Newton Howard and Jennifer Lawrence. She persuaded all four coaches to turn their chairs and chose to compete as one of the 17 composing members of Team Michi & Smudo. Kriewitz progressed to the battle rounds and was paired against Meike Rosendahl, singing "Royals" by Lorde and was saved by her coach. She made it to the knockout rounds, where she sang "Berlin" by RY X and was saved by her coach once again. During the live rounds, Kriewitz sang "Lights Will Guide Me" by Fahrenhaidt and was saved by her coach for the third consecutive time. On 2 December, the music video for her winner's single, "Ghost", premiered on the Digster On Stage's official YouTube channel. For the semi-final, Kriewitz sang "Warriors" by Imagine Dragons and was saved by the public vote. During the grand final, she was required to perform three songs – a duet with her coaches ("Name drauf"), a duet with a singer ("Take Me Home") and the winner's single ("Ghost"). Kriewitz was later announced as the winner after garnering 38% of the public vote.

After emerging as the winner of the fifth season of The Voice of Germany, Kriewitz's debut and winner's single, "Ghost", peaked at number 11 on the GfK Entertainment Charts, number 65 in the Ö3 Austria Top 40 and number 26 on the Swiss Hitparade. She subsequently signed a recording contract with Universal Music Group. Kriewitz then embarked on The Voice of Germany: Live in Concert concert tour with 8 other finalists, which ran from 27 December 2015 in Hof, Bavaria to 13 January 2016 in Hamburg, Germany.

==== Performances on The Voice of Germany ====
denotes a performance that entered the charts
denotes winner

Stage	Song choice	Original Artist	Date	Result
The Blinds	"The Hanging Tree"	James Newton Howard ft. Jennifer Lawrence	15 October 2015	Four chairs turned Joined Team Michi & Smudo
The Battles	"Royals" (vs. Meike Rosendahl)	Lorde	20 November 2015	Saved by Coach
The Knockouts	"Berlin"	RY X	26 November 2015	Saved by Coach
The Lives	"Lights Will Guide Me"	Fahrenhaidt	3 December 2015	Saved by Public Vote
Semi-Finals	"Warriors"	Imagine Dragons	10 December 2015	Saved by Public Vote
Finals	"Name drauf" (with Michi Beck and Smudo)	Die Fantastischen Vier	17 December 2015	Winner
Finals	"Take Me Home" (with Jess Glynne)	Jess Glynne	17 December 2015	Winner
Finals	"Ghost"	Kriewitz	17 December 2015	Winner

=== 2016–present: Eurovision Song Contest and Berlin ===
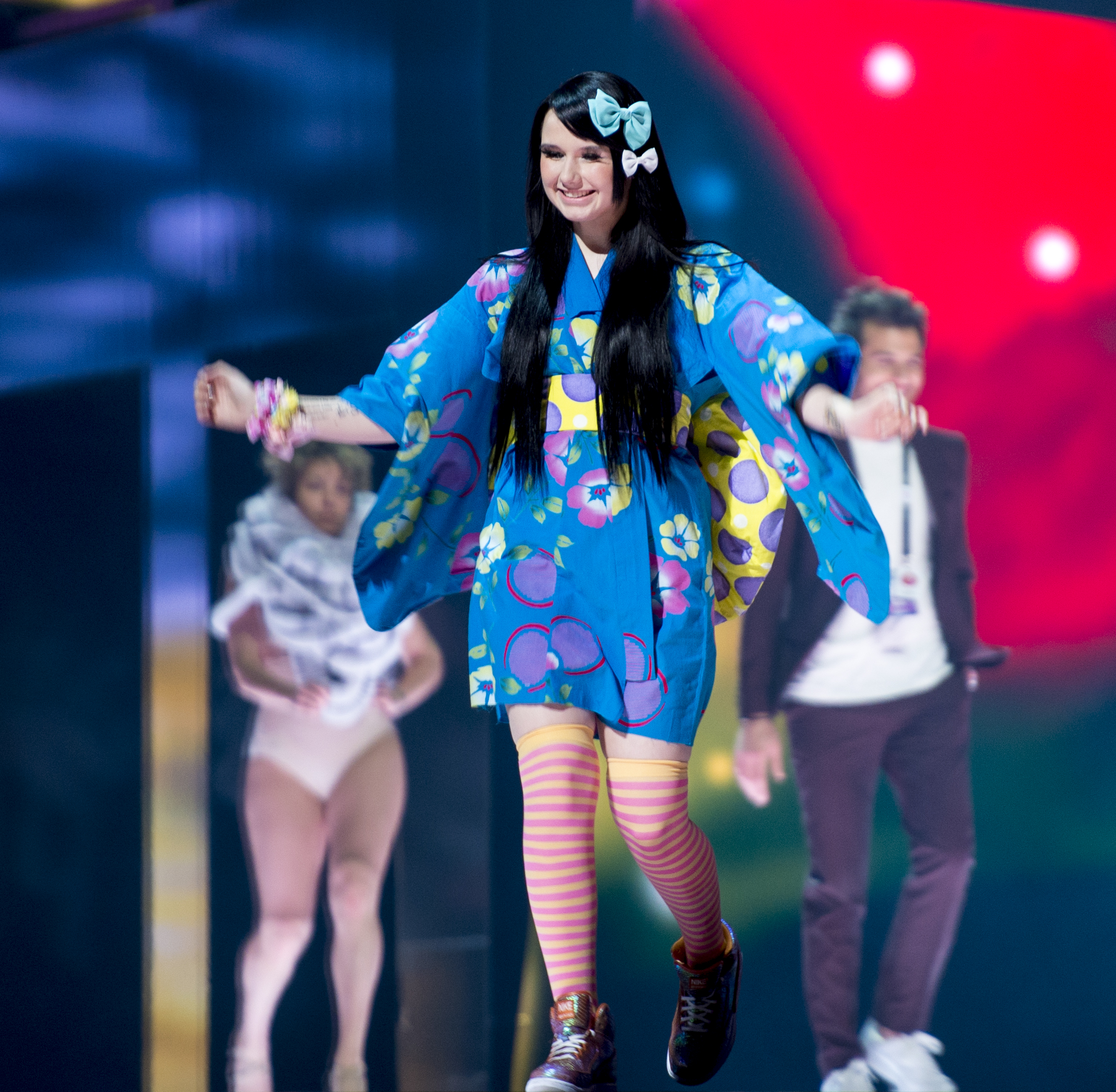
Kriewitz walking on the stage during a dress rehearsal for the opening act of the Eurovision Song Contest 2016 held in Stockholm, Sweden on 13 May.

2016 for Kriewitz began with an announcement which presented "Ghost" (2015), previously released as her debut and winner's single, as one of the ten finalists of Unser Lied für Stockholm, the German national competition held in search for their representative in the sixty-first edition of the Eurovision Song Contest. Prior to the competition, Xavier Naidoo was originally intended to be their representative after an internal selection, although numerous controversies which involved him ultimately resulted in his withdrawal. "Ghost" was drawn as the ninth performance of the first round, later advancing to the subsequent round after accumulating 28.78 percent of the public vote. It ultimately achieved the winning title after accumulating the highest number of votes with 44.5 percent from the public. The compilation album of the sixty-first edition of the competition titled Eurovision Song Contest: Stockholm 2016, released on 15 and 22 April digitally and physically respectively, featured "Ghost" on its first disk.

Kriewitz's debut studio album titled Berlin, released on 29 April, peaked at number eighteen on the GfK Entertainment Charts. It produced two singles; "Ghost" was previously released in December 2015, which served as her winner's and debut single following her emergence as the winner of the fifth season of The Voice of Germany. It went on to peak at number eleven on the GfK Entertainment Charts and has made a notable appearance on the Ö3 Austria Top 40 and the Swiss Hitparade at number sixty-four and twenty-six respectively. "Wild One" was released in September 2016, however it failed to match the success of its predecessor. She then embarked on her second headlining tour in order to further promote Berlin, which ran from 19 October through 20 April 2017.

In the Eurovision Song Contest, Kriewitz automatically advanced to the final since Germany was among the countries included in the "Big Five" rule. "Ghost" was drawn as the tenth performance of the final, where it later finished last after accumulating eleven points; it received one point from the national jury and ten points from the televoting. In an interview with Barbara Schöneberger, who previously presented Unser Lied für Stockholm, she told her: "Well, of course I'm a little sad that it actually happened and I finished last. But I personally don't think it's my fault and I was really satisfied with my performance." Kriewitz was then selected as the cover girl of the Welt Vegan magazine for their June 2016 issue, where it held a raffle for a copy of Berlin for five winners. Later that month, she served as a member of the national jury for 2016 KWF Audition In Berlin, a German national competition in search for their representative in the sixth edition of the K-Pop World Festival.

2017 saw the release of "Jetzt erst recht!", a collaboration between Kriewitz and Fargo. It served as the opening theme of the Song Contest Eineweltsong.

== Personal life ==
Kriewitz is an animal rights activist. She collaborated with the People for the Ethical Treatment of Animals for their "Vegan life is the best life" project, where her Japanese decora kei-inspired outfit and an autographed poster was auctioned. During an interview with PETA, Kriewitz explained her perspective on equality of all living things by saying: "The difference between the dog and pork is simply not for me - it is inhumane, animals that cannot defend themselves to abuse. I take my responsibility for all animals too seriously and would also say 'no' to leather, wool and animal experiments."

In 2021, Kriewitz identified as non-binary, using she/they pronouns.

== Discography ==
- Berlin (2016)

== Concert tours ==
Headlining

- The Voice of Germany: Live in Concert (2016)
- Berlin Tour (2016)

== Awards and nominations ==
Year	Organisation	Recipient	Category	Result
2016	Napster Fan Awards	Herself	Top Individual Artist	Won
2017	Echo Music Prize	Berlin	Künstlerin Pop National	Nominated

== Notes ==
Awards and achievements
Preceded by Charley Ann Schmutzler	The Voice of Germany; Winner; 2015	Succeeded by Tay Schmedtmann
Preceded by Ann Sophie with "Black Smoke"	Germany in the Eurovision Song Contest; 2016	Succeeded by Levina with "Perfect Life"
