= Hugo Skopnik =

German notary and colonial official (1857–1943)

Landeshauptmann of the German New Guinea Company Acting
- In office 11 September 1897 – 16 October 1898
- Preceded by: Albert Hahl
- Succeeded by: Rudolf von Bennigsen (as Governor of German New Guinea)

Personal details
- Born: Hugo Carl Theodor Skopnik; 29 December 1857 Bromberg (West Prussia), Kingdom of Prussia, German Confederation
- Died: 14 July 1943 (aged 85) Gleiwitz (Upper Silesia), Free State of Prussia, Nazi Germany
- Spouse: Franziska Kirchenwitz
- Occupation: Notary, colonial official

Hugo Carl Theodor Skopnik (29 December 1857 – 14 July 1943) was a German notary and colonial official. He was acting Landeshauptmann of the German New Guinea Company from 11 September 1897 to 16 October 1898.

== Life ==
Comparatively little is known about Hugo Skopnik. He was a son of the District Court Judge in Bromberg Theodor Skopnik, who came from Königsberg, and his wife Adele (née Raabe, widowed Henning). At his baptism on 9 February 1858, the godparents were August Geßler, district physician Dr. Junker, government assessor le Juge, and Lina Deekens, Rosa Pohl and Emma Raabe.

Hugo Skopnik was married twice. On 29 November 1902, he married Franziska Kirchenwitz, a native of Oerden (today Uradz), Neustettin District.

On 19 August 1886, the Thorner Presse announced: "The lawyer Skopnik in Mewe is admitted to the bar at the regional court in Stolp."

Hugo Skopnik died on 14 July 1943 in the Municipal Hospital of Gleiwitz. At that time he lived with his wife Franziska in the house at Seminarstraße 10 in Myslowitz, Kattowitz District.

== Work in German New Guinea ==
After Landeshauptmann Curt von Hagen, general director of the German New Guinea Company, was murdered by the natives on a trip through the protectorate, Hugo Skopnik, who had previously worked as a lawyer in Stolp, was chosen as his successor. He left Genoa on 27 July 1897. (Note: The investigation into the 1895 murder of travel writer Otto Ehrenfried Ehlers not only cost the life of Curt von Hagen, but also of Ehlers's alleged murderers, two police soldiers from Buka Island (Solomon Archipelago), who were killed with spears as punishment and their heads were placed in Stephansort as a deterrent.)

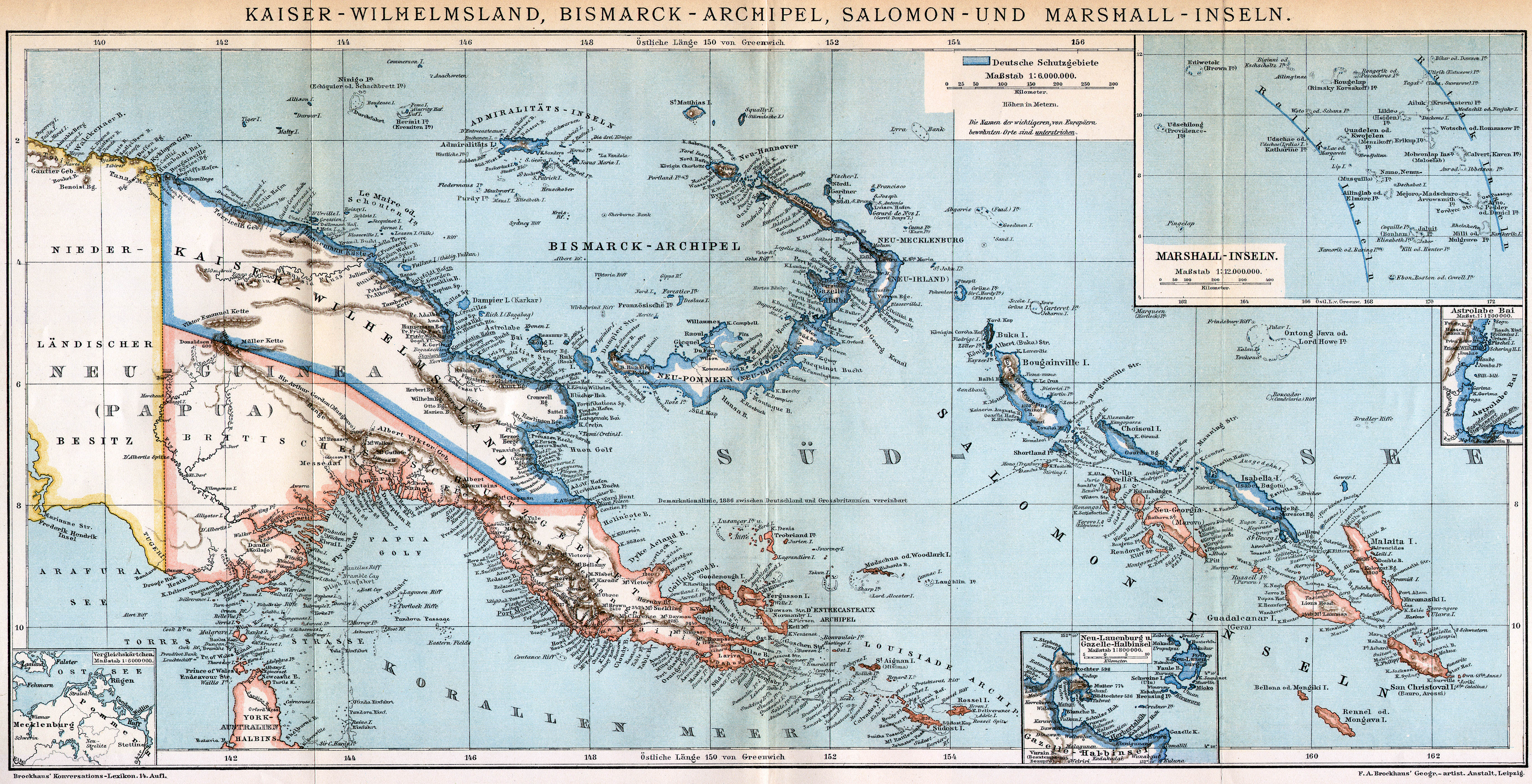
German New Guinea (borders before 1898).

Skopnik served as Landeshauptmann of the German New Guinea Company on an interim basis from 11 September 1897 to 16 October 1898. The German New Guinea Company was founded in 1884 in Berlin by banker Adolph von Hansemann to acquire colonial property in the western part of the South Seas. According to the recollections of the judge and deputy governor of German New Guinea, Heinrich Schnee, Skopnik had to work according to von Hansemann's instructions.

Hugo Skopnik was the last Landeshauptmann of the German New Guinea Company. According to the memories of contemporaries, the choice of him was not the best. Lieutenant (ret.) Hans Blum (Note: Hans Blum was a former employee of the German New Guinea Company, which operated plantations in Kaiser-Wilhelmsland. He wrote his doctoral thesis on the "population problem".) later wrote:

The death of Curt von Hagen was a hard blow for the young colony, which owes to his restless energy almost everything that has lasting value and is capable of development in New Guinea. Not that there were not at times some very useful and capable officials among his predecessors, but admirals, senior postal counsellors and court assessors may be very useful in and of themselves, but in Kaiser-Wilhelmsland they were certainly not at home and only poorly compensated for their lack of expertise with endless paperwork and orders. The company's bureaucratic system – if you can call constant change a system at all – required people who could handle the pen even in the jungle in order to produce beautifully colored reports for the shareholders. Now the New Guinea Company seems to have found in its current first official, the lawyer Skopnik, a general director who was exactly what it wanted; and since this gentleman gave up his practice as a lawyer in Pomerania 'for family reasons', he may have adopted purely chromatic principles about earning money. But he could only consider himself qualified to be a colonial official because of his total ignorance of the situation. Thanks to his activity, the colony has been in complete stagnation for the past year and his personal companion is a Silenus, who has sprung from the train of Bacchus and who, with the sparkling water in his left hand and a maiden from Batavia pressed to his breast in his right, occasionally lets it be known that the Ramu expedition he has planned will soon begin despite the almost insurmountable difficulties.

— Die Zukunft, p. 386 (1899)

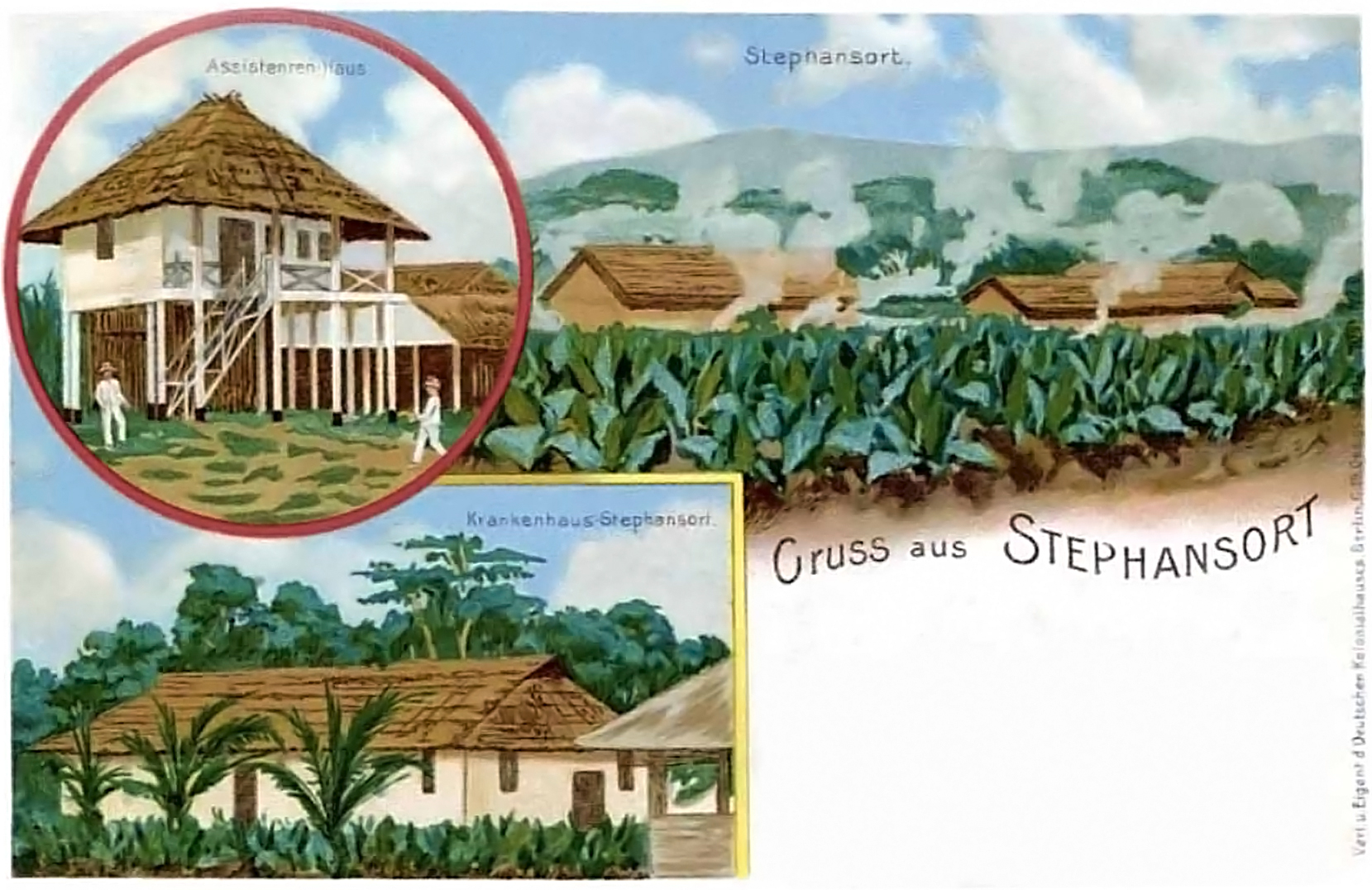
Postcard from the trading station Stephansort, which still shows the tobacco plantations that were abandoned in 1901.

"The affairs of the previous provincial government of the New Guinea Company were handed over to me by the general director and previous provincial governor of the New Guinea Company, Mr. Skopnik, who had come over from Stephansort to Herbertshöhe for this purpose", Heinrich Schnee later recalled.

In the Deutsche Allgemeine Zeitung of 6 October 1909, Hugo Skopnik advertised: "I am admitted as a lawyer at the Royal Regional Court II Berlin, office: W. 57, Bülowstr. 73, I. 9700 / Justice Counsel Hugo Skopnik, until July 1908 Kgs.-Wusterhausen."

Hugo Skopnik applied for a job at the Reich Colonial Office in 1910. In the meantime, he was living in Friedenau, Hähnelstr. 20.

In July 1912, Skopnik was appointed notary in the Berlin-Schöneberg District Court for the duration of his admission to the bar. He was still practicing in 1939, now in Berlin-Charlottenburg, Leibnizstraße 44, as can be seen from a public notice in the German Reichsanzeiger and Preußischer Staatsanzeiger of November 3, 1939.

== Bibliography ==
- (in German) Joachim Schultz-Naumann: Unter Kaisers Flagge. Deutschlands Schutzgebiete im Pazifik und in China einst und heute. München 1985.
- (in German) Wolfgang Boochs: Deutsche Kolonien: Neuguinea und Samoa. BoD – Books on Demand, 2021.
- (in German) Jürgen Kilian: Des Kaisers Gouverneure: Sozialprofil, Deutungsmuster und Praktiken einer kolonialen Positionselite, 1885–1914. Global- und Kolonialgeschichte, Bd. 21, 2024, ISBN 978-3-8376-7205-3.
- (in German) Hans-Jürgen Bauer: Des Kaisers Platz an der Sonne: Die Kolonie Deutsch Neuguinea. 2024 (ebook).

Government offices
Preceded by Albert Hahl	Landeshauptmann of the German New Guinea Company; Acting; 1897–1898	Succeeded by Rudolf von Bennigsen as Governor of German New Guinea
