= Dawn (Ry X album) =

Studio album by Ry X
- Released: 6 May 2016
- Length: 52:28
- Label: Infectious Music

Ry X chronology
Ry Cuming (2010)	Dawn (2016)	Unfurl (2019)

Professional ratings
Review scores
Source	Rating
Clash	7/10
DIY	4/5 stars
"The Interns"	8/10

Dawn is the second studio album by Ry X, released through Infectious Records and Loma Vista Records. The album was released on 6 May 2016. The album charted at #34 in the UK Albums Chart as well as charting in Germany, France, Canada and Australia. It gained favourable reception from the media, with a New York Times review saying "His voice is a pearly, androgynous tenor, a vessel for liquid melancholy that blurs words at the edges. He stretches pop structures with repetition that grows devotional, obsessive, hypnotic". In support of the album, RY X began an extensive tour across Europe and the US as well as appearing at many festival throughout 2016 such as Barn on the Farm and Montreux Jazz Festival.

== Track listing ==
No.	Title	Length
1.	"Dawn"	1:55
2.	"Shortline"	3:54
3.	"Salt"	5:24
4.	"Howling"	5:09
5.	"Only"	4:28
6.	"Berlin"	2:54
7.	"Beacon"	6:02
8.	"Deliverance"	3:50
9.	"Haste"	4:04
10.	"Hold Me Love"	3:13
11.	"Sweat"	3:59
12.	"Lean"	7:29
Total length:		52:28

== Charts ==
Chart (2019)	Peak position
Australian Albums (ARIA Charts)	56
Austrian Albums (Ö3 Austria)	60
Belgian Albums (Ultratop Flanders)	41
Belgian Albums (Ultratop Wallonia)	52
Canadian Albums (Canadian Albums Chart)	21
Dutch Albums (Album Top 100)	57
French Albums (SNEP)	114
German Albums (Offizielle Top 100)	38
Spanish Albums (Productores de Música de España)	66
Swiss Albums (Schweizer Hitparade)	52
UK Albums (UK Albums Chart)	34
