= Rudolf von Bennigsen (governor) =

German colonial official (1859–1912)

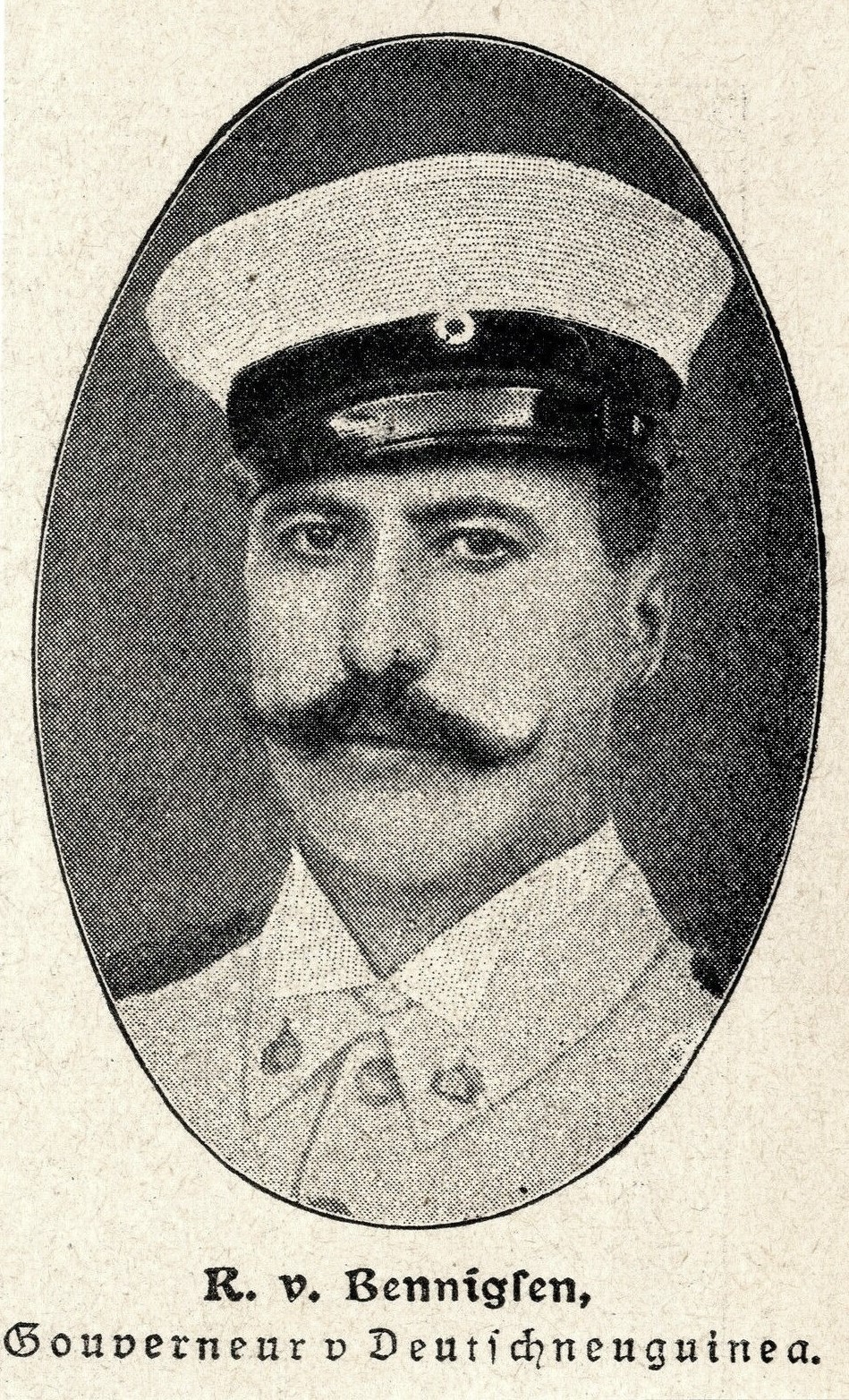
- Bennigsen in 1901

Governor of German New Guinea
- In office 1 April 1899 – 10 July 1901
- Monarch: Wilhelm II
- Chancellor: Chlodwig zu Hohenlohe-Schillingsfürst; Bernhard von Bülow
- Director of the Colonial Department: Gerhard von Buchka; Oscar Wilhelm Stübel
- Preceded by: Hugo Skopnik (as Acting Landeshauptmann of the German New Guinea Company)
- Succeeded by: Albert Hahl

Personal details
- Born: 12 May 1859 Bennigsen (Springe), Kingdom of Hanover, German Confederation
- Died: 3 May 1912 (aged 52) Berlin, Kingdom of Prussia, German Empire
- Occupation: Colonial official

Rudolf von Bennigsen (Bennigsen near Springe, 12 May 1859 – Berlin, 3 May 1912) was a German colonial official. He was the governor of German New Guinea from 1 April 1899 to 10 July 1901.

== Biography ==
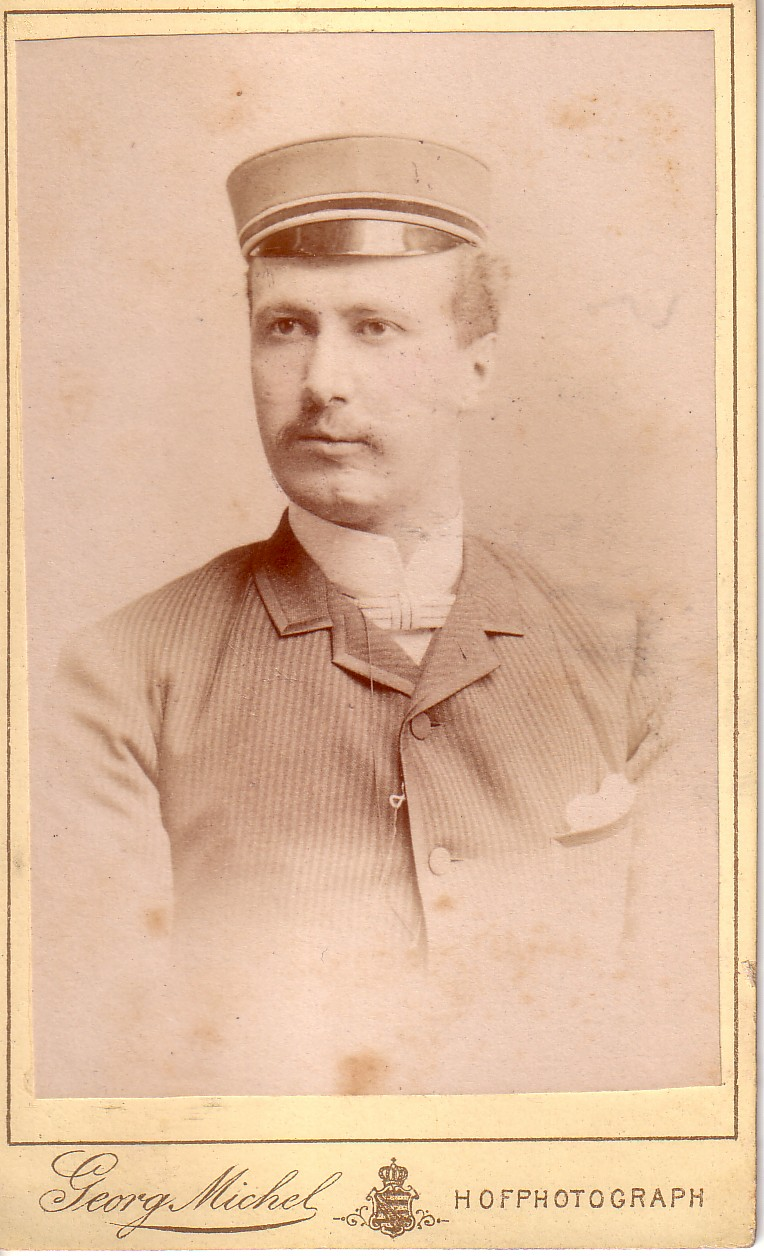
Bennigsen c. 1879

Bennigsen was a son of the Reichstag member Rudolf von Bennigsen. He was descended from an old Hanoverian family, which was named after its Bennigsen estate near Springe. He studied law at the Kaiser Wilhelm University in Strasbourg and in 1878 became a member of the Corps Suevia there. When there was a crisis in the mid-1880s, he became active again and fought as an assessor for the First Batch. For this, Suevia later awarded him honorary membership. The SC-Comradeship of the Corps was named after him in 1941.

Bennigsen was government assessor in the Imperial Territory of Alsace-Lorraine, then district administrator of the Prussian district of Peine. In 1893 he became financial director in the colony of German East Africa, where he also acted as deputy to the local governor. In German East Africa, at Bennigsen's suggestion, the "hut tax" was introduced in 1897, the ruthless collection of which led to countless uprisings among the local population in the following years.

On 1 April 1899, Bennigsen was appointed the first governor of German New Guinea and the island area of the Carolines, Palau and the Marianas. In the same year he moved the seat of the colonial administration from Friedrich-Wilhelmshafen (today Madang) on Kaiser-Wilhelmsland to Herbertshöhe (today Kokopo) on the island of Neupommern (today New Britain). Bennigsen was mainly concerned with enforcing the German Empire's claim to colonial power through punitive expeditions – he himself spoke of "bringing order to the neglected conditions in the colony of German New Guinea". In June 1900, Robert Koch was a guest of Bennigsen in Herbertshöhe during his New Guinea expedition to research malaria. Whether for political or health reasons remains unclear, but on 10 July 1901, Bennigsen ended his service in German New Guinea by handing over the governorship to Albert Hahl.

In 1902 Bennigsen became a board member of the German Colonial Society for South West Africa. From 1904 to 1909 he was a representative of Kölnische Zeitung in Berlin, from 1909 to 1912 director of the German Colonial Society for South West Africa, on whose behalf he made trips to German South West Africa in 1903 and 1910.

== Bibliography ==
- (in German) Heinrich Schnee (Hrsg.): Deutsches Kolonial-Lexikon. Band 1, S. 163, Leipzig 1920. Deutsches Kolonial-Lexikon online
- (in German) Johannes Grüntzig, Heinz Mehldorn: Expedition ins Reich der Seuchen, Medizinische Himmelfahrtskommandos der deutschen Kaiser- und Kolonialzeit. Spektrum Akademischer Verlag, München 2005, ISBN 3-8274-1622-1.

Government offices
| Preceded by Hugo Skopnik as Acting Landeshauptmann of the German New Guinea Company | Governor of German New Guinea; 1899–1901 | Succeeded by Albert Hahl |
