= Unfurl =

Studio album by Ry X
- Released: 15 February 2019
- Length: 51:24
- Label: Infectious Music

Ry X chronology
Dawn (2016)	Unfurl (2019)	Blood Moon (2022)

Singles from Unfurl
- 1. "Untold" Released: 9 October 2018

Professional ratings
Aggregate scores
Source	Rating
Metacritic	75/100
Review scores
Source	Rating
Clash	8/10
DIY	3/5 stars
Exclaim!	7/10

Unfurl is the third studio album by Australian singer-songwriter Ry X. It was released on 15 February 2019 through Infectious Music.

== Track listing ==
No.	Title	Length
1.	"Body"	1:25
2.	"Untold"	4:18
3.	"Bound"	4:58
4.	"Body Sun"	5:00
5.	"YaYaYa"	3:49
6.	"Coven"	4:58
7.	"Hounds"	3:59
8.	"Foreign Tides"	3:52
9.	"The Water"	4:22
10.	"Mallorca"	3:04
11.	"To Know"	4:57
12.	"Sun"	1:22
13.	"Fumbling Prayer"	5:24

== Charts ==
Chart (2019)	Peak position
Austrian Albums (Ö3 Austria)	60
Belgian Albums (Ultratop Flanders)	11
Belgian Albums (Ultratop Wallonia)	70
Dutch Albums (Album Top 100)	54
French Albums (SNEP)	184
German Albums (Offizielle Top 100)	38
Lithuanian Albums (AGATA)	29
Scottish Albums (OCC)	82
Swiss Albums (Schweizer Hitparade)	31
UK Album Downloads (OCC)	70
UK Independent Albums (OCC)	11
