= Bennigsen =

- Village of Springe
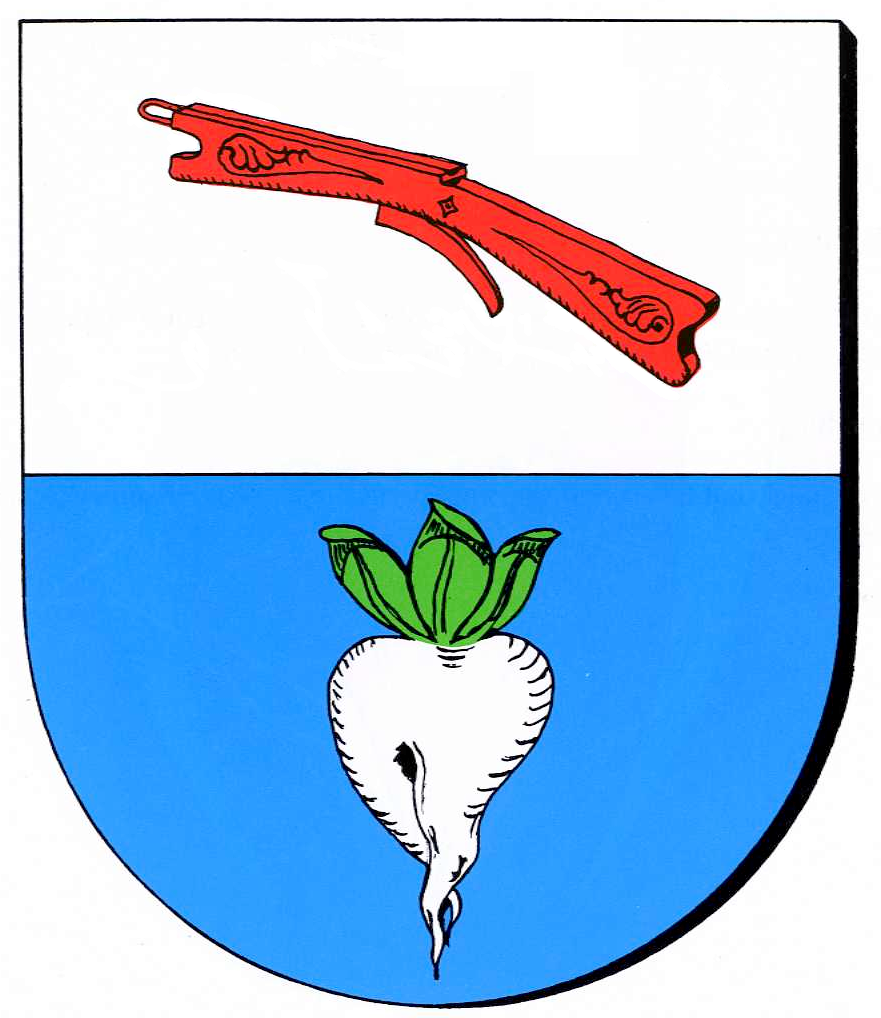
- Coat of arms
- Interactive map of Bennigsen
- Location within Germany Location within Lower Saxony
- Coordinates: 52°14′20″N 9°40′10″E
- Country: Germany
- State: Lower Saxony
- District: Hanover
- Town: Springe
- Elevation: 80 m (260 ft)

Population (2019)
  - Total: 4,052
- Time zone: UTC+01:00 (CET)
  - Summer (DST): UTC+02:00 (CEST)
- Postal codes: 31832
- Dialling codes: 05045

Bennigsen is a village near Springe in the district of Hanover in Lower Saxony, Germany. Since 1974 it has been administered by the municipality of Springe.

The Hanover–Altenbeken railway runs through the village with the local railstation being served by the S5 line of the Hanover S-Bahn network. Former Premier Baseball League team Bennigsen Beavers is based there. Famous people of Bennigsen include 19th century national liberal politician Rudolf von Bennigsen, a member of the eponymous noble family. In 2016, Voice of Germany winner Jamie-Lee Kriewitz from Bennigsen was selected to represent Germany at the Eurovision Song Contest.
