= Ghost (Jamie-Lee Kriewitz song) =

2015 song by Jamie-Lee Kriewitz

Single by Jamie-Lee Kriewitz

from the album Berlin
- Released: 12 December 2015
- Length: 3:52
- Label: Polydor; Island
- Songwriter(s): Thomas Burchia; Anna Leyne; Conrad Hensel

Eurovision Song Contest 2016 entry
- Country: Germany
- Artist(s): Jamie-Lee Kriewitz
- Language: English
- Composer(s): Thomas Burchia; Anna Leyne; Conrad Hensel
- Lyricist(s): Anna Leyne

Finals performance
- Final result: 26th
- Final points: 11

Entry chronology
- ◄ "Black Smoke" (2015)
- "Perfect Life" (2017) ►

"Ghost" is a song performed by German singer Jamie-Lee Kriewitz. The song represented Germany in the Eurovision Song Contest 2016 in Stockholm, Sweden, and was written by Thomas Burchia (better known as DJ Thomilla), Anna Leyne, and Conrad Hensel. The song was released as a digital download on 12 December 2015 through Polydor and Island Records. It was also performed as Kriewitz's winner's single during season five of The Voice of Germany.

== Eurovision Song Contest ==
Kriewitz was announced as one of the participants in Unser Lied für Stockholm on 12 January 2016. In the final, she performed ninth and later advanced to the superfinal. She performed last in the superfinal, and was later announced as the winner with 44.5% of the tele-vote. She then represented Germany in the Eurovision Song Contest 2016. Being a member of the "Big Five", the song automatically advanced to the final, where it came in last place with 11 points.

== Track listing ==
Digital download
No.	Title	Length
1.	"Ghost" (From The Voice of Germany)	3:52

== Charts ==
Weekly chart performance for "Ghost"
Chart (2015)	Peak position
Austria (Ö3 Austria Top 40)	65
Germany (GfK)	11
Sweden Heatseekers (Sverigetopplistan)	10
Switzerland (Schweizer Hitparade)	26

== Release history ==
Release dates and formats for "Ghost"
Region	Date	Format	Label	Ref.
Various	12 December 2015	Digital download	Polydor; Island	
