= RY X =

Australian musician (born 1988)

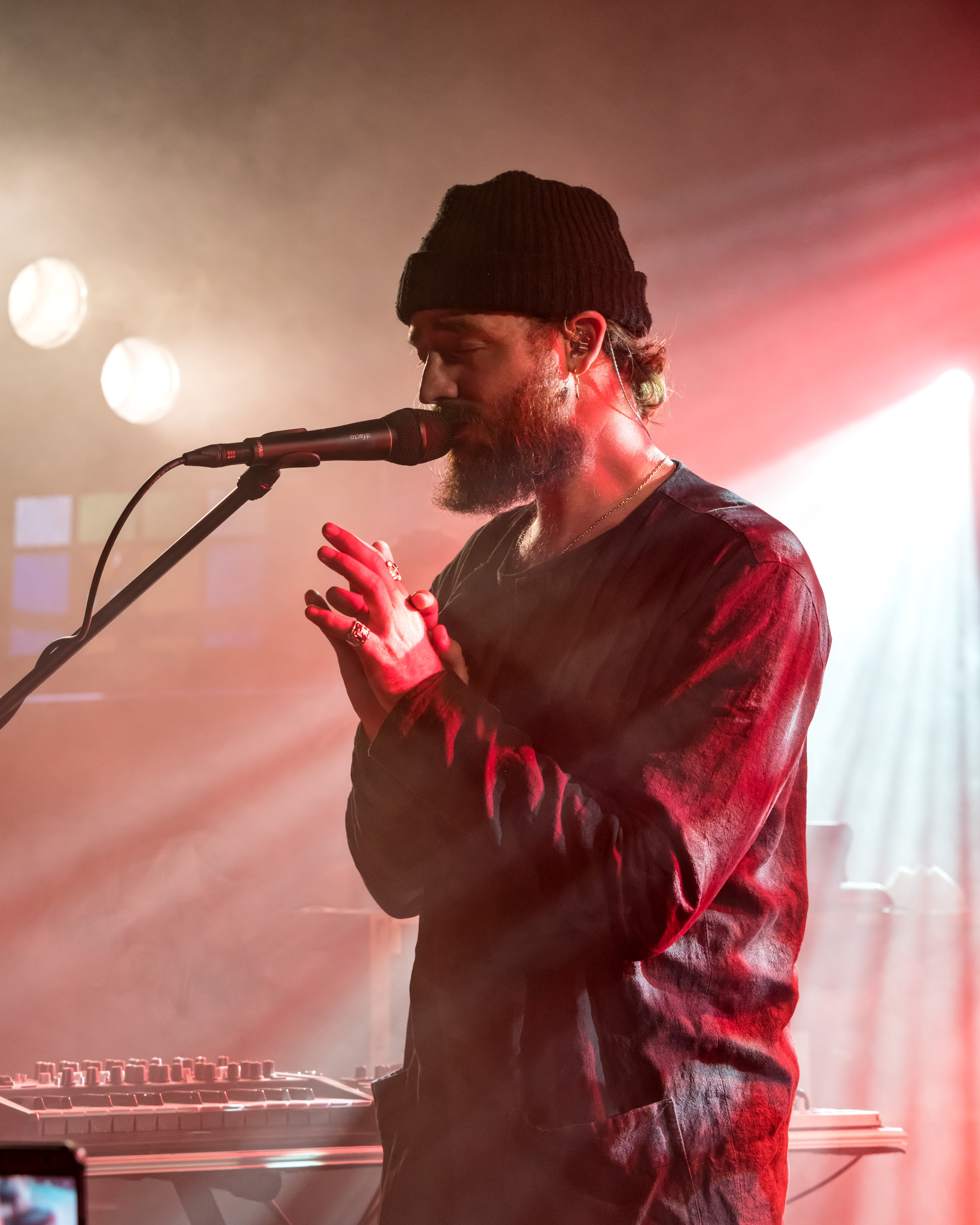
- RY X performing in 2017

Background information
- Born: Ry Cuming; 6 May 1988 (age 38); Woodford Island, Australia
- Genres: Alt-pop; indietronica; indie folk
- Occupations: Singer; musician; songwriter; record producer
- Instruments: Vocals; guitar
- Years active: 2006–present
- Labels: Jive Records; Dumont Dumont; Infectious Music UK
- Member of: The Acid
- Website: ry-x.com

Ry Cuming (born 6 May 1988), better known by his stage name RY X, is an Australian singer, musician, songwriter, and record producer. He was the first artist signed to the Stockholm-based label Dumont Dumont.

== Early life ==
Ry Cuming was born on 6 May 1988 on Woodford Island, where he became a surfer. He now resides in California.

== Career ==
Cuming has cited Pearl Jam and Jeff Buckley as his greatest influences; he started writing music at the age of 16 after hearing Buckley's 1994 album Grace. His song "Let Your Spirit Fly" appeared on the soundtrack of the 2006 film Hoot. Cuming then moved to Los Angeles, where he was signed by Jive Records, releasing his self-titled debut album on 20 July 2010. He briefly toured with Maroon 5, becoming their opening act in select venues.

Cuming won the 2010 Dolphin Awards for "Best Pop Song" and "Best New Artist". In 2012, he collaborated with Frank Wiedemann to release "Howling" on the German record label Innervisions, including a remix by Âme. Cuming's EP Berlin, released on 28 August 2013, was made available as 12" vinyl and digital. The title track charted in France, Germany, and the United Kingdom. The track also caught the attention of singer Sam Smith, who covered it.

In 2014, Cuming became the lead singer of the band The Acid, which he formed with Adam Freeland and Steve Nalepa. The trio released an album titled Liminal, in July 2014. Together with Wiedemann he formed the band Howling and released a full-length album, Sacred Ground, on Ninja Tune and Monkeytown Records. Cuming's single "Howling" was featured in the movie Everything, Everything. The remix by Âme was featured in the movie Taken 3.

In May 2016, Cuming released his second album Dawn through Infectious Records and Loma Vista Records. The album charted at number 34 in the UK Album Charts as well as charting in Germany, France, Canada, and Australia. It gained favourable reception from the media, with a New York Times review saying, "His voice is a pearly, androgynous tenor, a vessel for liquid melancholy that blurs words at the edges. He stretches pop structures with repetition that grows devotional, obsessive, hypnotic." In support of the album, Coming began an extensive tour across Europe and the U.S. as well as appearing at many festivals throughout 2016, such as Barn on the Farm and the Montreux Jazz Festival.

Cuming's third studio album, Unfurl, was released in February 2019 via Infectious Music. The single "Untold" was released from the album in October 2018, which coincided with the beginning of his global tour.

“Cuming has previously appeared on tracks by Diplo, ODESZA, Duke Dumont, and Black Coffee, and was commissioned to remix Rihanna’s “Love on the Brain”.”

Blood Moon, Cuming's fourth album, was released in June 2022 via BMG. The album was recorded, produced and engineered almost entirely by Cuming at his home studio in Topanga. Blood Moon was released on the same day as Drake's album Honestly, Nevermind. "It was a dual celebration for RY X, who co-wrote and co-produced the Honestly, Nevermind track “Sticky”.” Blood Moon features collaborator Ólafur Arnalds on the track, "Colorblind". The project also took Cuming to Iceland to collaborate with Imre and Marne Van Opstal and nature photographer Benjamin Hardman for the official videos of "Your Love" and "Come Back". Blood Moon Remixes was released the following year, in June 2023.

Moths was released in September 2023 with its debut on Youtube with the official video, shot in the Sahara desert.

== Live Performances ==
Cuming, performing as RY X, has played non-traditional venues throughout his career, including a Cercle livestreamed show from Brazil's Lençóis Maranhenses National Park. In 2021, Cuming performed a livestream show produced by Driift from Vibiana Cathedral. In September 2023, Cuming performed at London's St. Paul's Cathedral with the London Contemporary Orchestra. It was said that this show sold out so quickly, the waitlist consisted of over 4000 people.

=== Orchestral Shows ===
Artist	Year	City	Venue	Orchestra
RY X	2017	Berlin	Konzerthaus Berlin	Deutsches Kammerorchester
RY X	2018	Munich	Alte Kongresshalle	Münchner Rundfunkorchester
RY X	2018	Brussels	AB	Brussels Philharmonic Soloists
RY X	2018	London	Barbican	London Contemporary Orchestra
RY X	2019	London	Royal Albert Hall	London Contemporary Orchestra
RY X	2021	Los Angeles	Walt Disney Concert Hall	LA Philharmonic
RY X	2023	London	Roundhouse	London Philharmonic Orchestra
RY X	2023	London	St Paul's Cathedral	London Contemporary Orchestra

== Discography ==
=== Albums ===
Title	Album details	Peak chart positions				
Title	Album details	BEL (FL)	FRA	GER	NLD	SWI
Ry Cuming	Released: 20 July 2010; Label: Jive; Format: Digital download, CD	—	—	—	—	—
Dawn	Released: 6 May 2016; Label: Loma Vista, Infectious; Format: Digital download, CD	41	114	87	57	52
Unfurl	Released: 15 February 2019; Label: Infectious; Format: Digital download, CD	11	184	38	54	31
Blood Moon	Released: 17 June 2022; Label: Infectious; Format: Digital download, CD	151	—	—	—	68

=== Extended plays ===
Title	Details	Certification
Berlin	Released: 2013; Label: Infectious Music UK; Format: Digital download, 12" vinyl	ARIA: Gold

=== Charted singles ===
Year	Title	Peak chart positions					Album
Year	Title	UK	BEL (FL) Tip	BEL (WA) Tip	FRA	GER	Album
2013	"Berlin"	38	—	42*	15	46	Berlin EP
2018	"Untold"	—	9*	—	—	—	Unfurl
2018	"YaYaYa"	—	19*	—	—	—	Unfurl

*Did not appear in the official Belgian Ultratop 50 charts, but rather in the bubbling under Ultratip charts.

== Awards & nominations ==
=== Australian Music Prize ===
The Australian Music Prize has provided a mouthpiece to the best albums in Australian contemporary music.

Year	Category	Nominee/Work	Result	Ref
2022	Australian Music Prize	Blood Moon	Nominated	

=== Dolphin Awards ===
The NCEIA Dolphin Music Awards are an annual iconic local music event, organised by the North Coast Entertainment Industry Association (NCEIA).

Year	Category	Nominee/Work	Result	Ref
2013	Best Pop Song	"Berlin"	Won	
2013	Best New Artist	RY X	Won	

=== Grammy Awards ===
The Grammy Awards are awards presented by The Recording Academy of the United States to recognise outstanding achievements in music.

Year	Category	Nominee/Work	Result	Ref
2016	Best Remixed Recording	Only (Kaskade x Lipless Remix)	Nominated	

=== Music Week Awards ===
The Music Week Awards are the UK's only music awards that recognise labels, publishing, live, retail, A&R, radio, marketing and PR.

Year	Category	Nominee/Work	Result	Ref
2021	Sync of the Year	Berlin - Normal People	Nominated	
