= Berlin (EP) =

Berlin EP

EP and single by RY X
- Released: 27 November 2013
- Length: 13:21
- Label: Dumont Dumont; Infectious Music UK

RY X chronology
| Ry Cuming (2010) | Berlin EP (2013) | Dawn (2016) |

Berlin is a 2013 EP by Australian singer and musician RY X, released on Infectious Music UK.

== Track listing ==
1. "Berlin" – 2:50
2. "Shortline" – 4:34
3. "Vampires" – 3:03
4. "Wanderlust" – 2:54

== "Berlin" single ==
"Berlin" was the first successful single of RY X released as main single from the similarly titled EP in 2013. it reached number 15 on SNEP, the official French Singles Chart and also appeared on UK Singles Chart peaking at number 38 and in German Singles Chart and on Ultratip Belgian (Wallonia) Singles Chart. A music video was also released. The song reached spot 38 in the UK charts, lasting 7 weeks in the top 75.

== Charts ==
"Berlin" single

| Chart (2014) | Peak position |
|---|---|
| Belgium (Ultratip Bubbling Under Wallonia) | 42 |
| France (SNEP) | 15 |
| Germany (GfK) | 46 |
| UK Singles (OCC) | 38 |

== Certifications ==
Certifications for "Berlin" single
| Region | Certification | Certified units/sales |
|---|---|---|
| Australia (ARIA) | Gold | 35,000^{‡} |
| New Zealand (RMNZ) | Gold | 15,000^{‡} |
| Norway (IFPI Norway) | 2× Platinum | 120,000^{‡} |
| United Kingdom (BPI) | Silver | 200,000^{‡} |
Streaming
| Sweden (GLF) | Platinum | 8,000,000^{†} |
^{‡} Sales+streaming figures based on certification alone.^{†} Streaming-only figures based on certification alone.
