= The Voice of Germany season 5 =

The Voice of Germany
- Season 5
- Hosted by: Thore Schölermann; Lena Gercke
- Judges: Rea Garvey; Michi & Smudo; Stefanie Kloß; Andreas Bourani
- Winner: Jamie-Lee Kriewitz
- Winning coach: Michi & Smudo
- Runner-up: Ayke Witt

Release
- Original network: ProSieben and Sat.1
- Original release: October 15 – December 17, 2015

Season chronology
- ← Previous; Season 4 Next → Season 6

The Voice of Germany (season 5) is a German reality talent show that premiered on 15 October 2015 on ProSieben and Sat.1. Based on the reality singing competition The Voice of Holland, the series was created by Dutch television producer John de Mol. It is part of an international series. Stefanie Kloß, Rea Garvey, and Michi & Smudo returned as coaches for season 5, while Andreas Bourani was a new coach for season 5, replacing Samu Haber. Thore Schölermann returned as a host for season 5. Lena Gercke was the co-host. The season was won by Jamie-Lee Kriewitz, who had already performed The Hanging Tree, which was her song at the blind auditions, for Jennifer Lawrence at The Hunger Games: Mockingjay – Part 2 premiere in Berlin. At age 17, Kriewitz became the youngest winner in the show's history. Michi & Smudo also achieved their second win as a coach, making them the first, and so far only, coaches to win multiple consecutive seasons.

== Coaches and Hosts ==
In May 2015, it was announced that Samu Haber would not be returning as a coach this season, while Rea Garvey, Stefanie Kloß and Michi & Smudo would be continuing. They are joined by new coach Andreas Bourani.

The Voice of Germany season 5 coaches

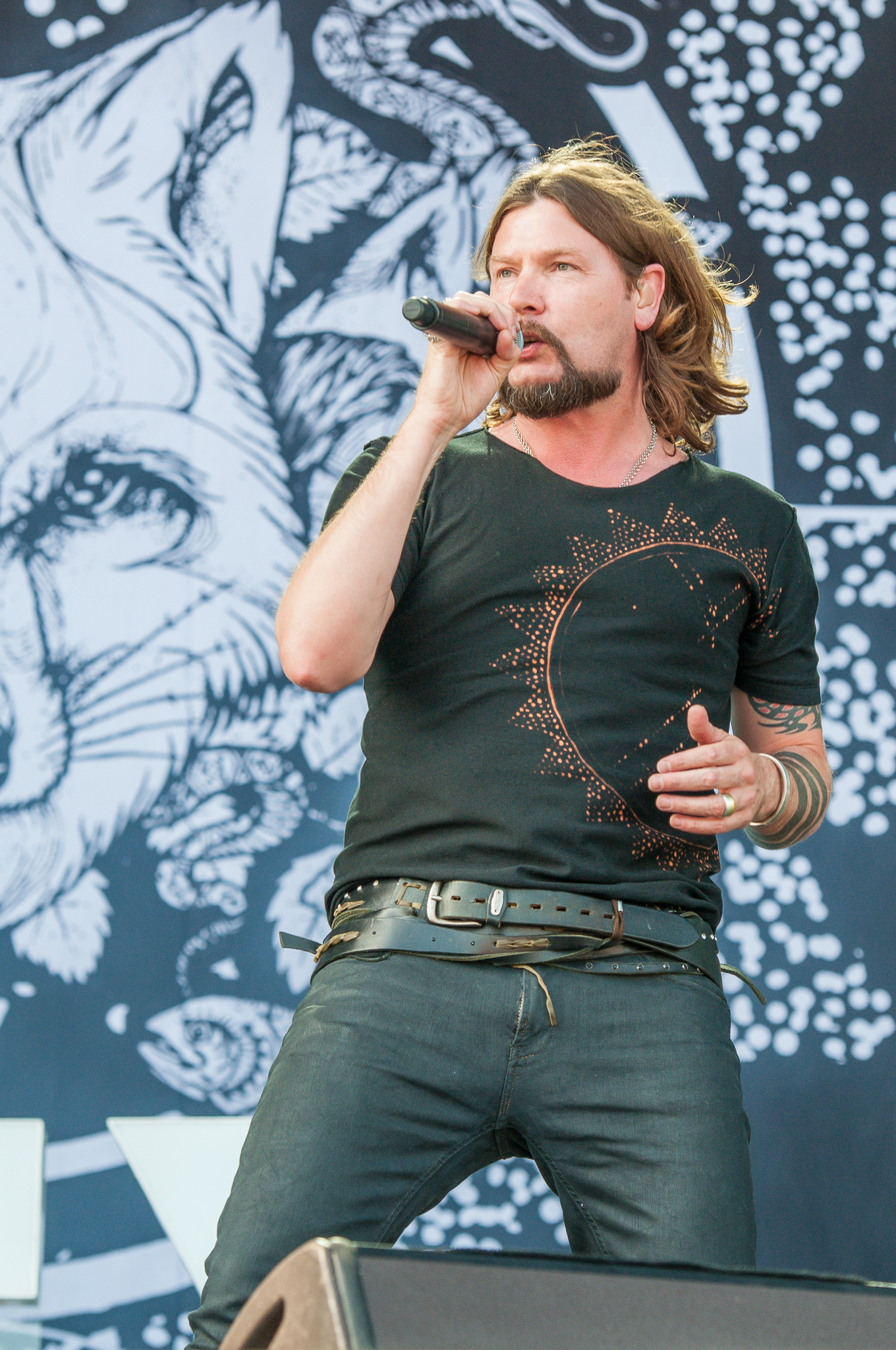
Rea Garvey

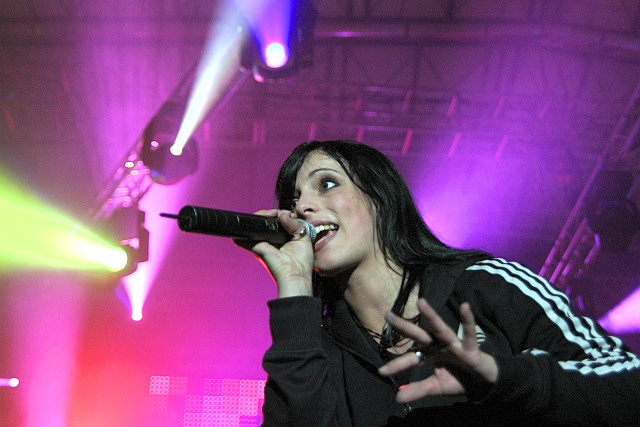
Stefanie Kloß

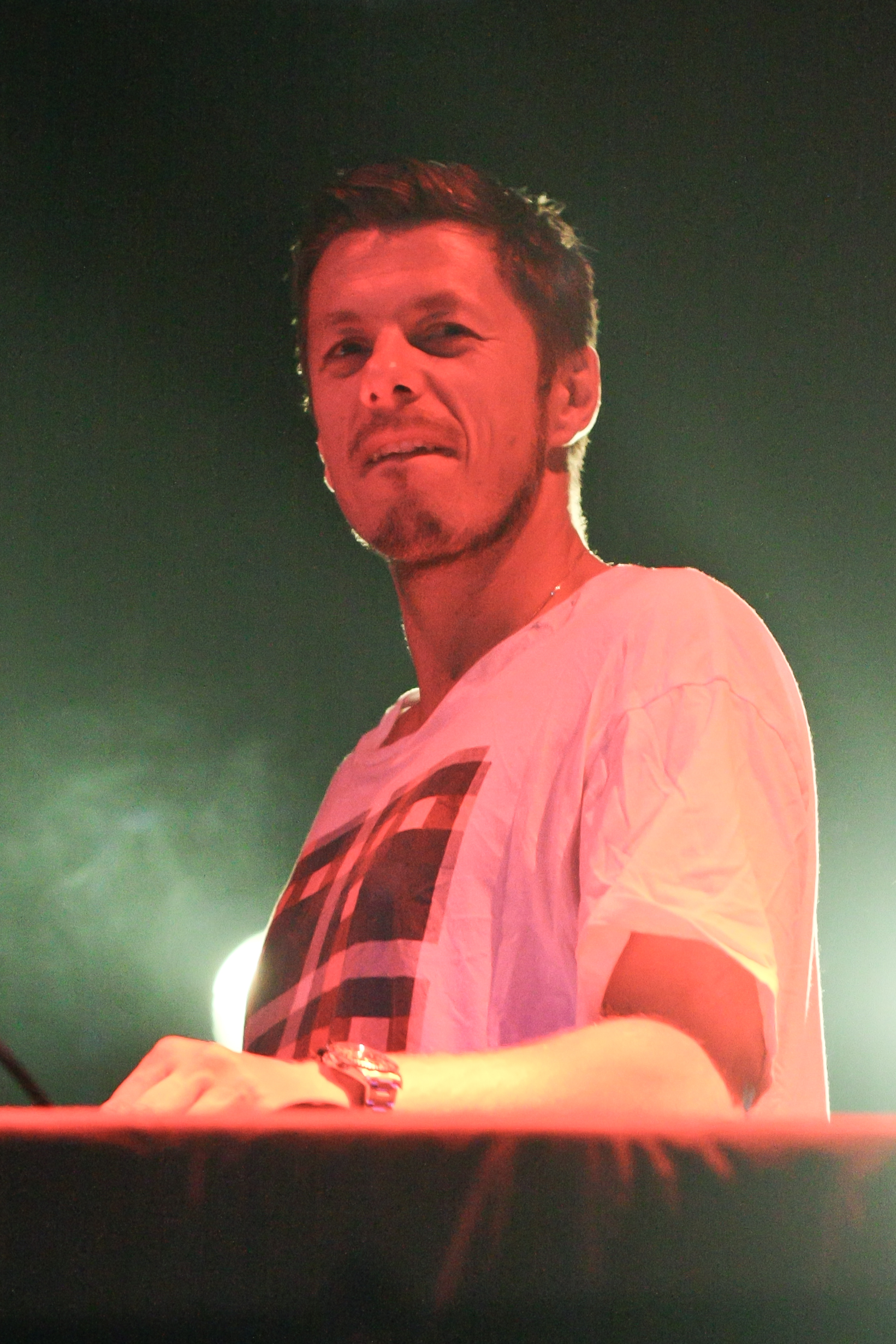
Michi

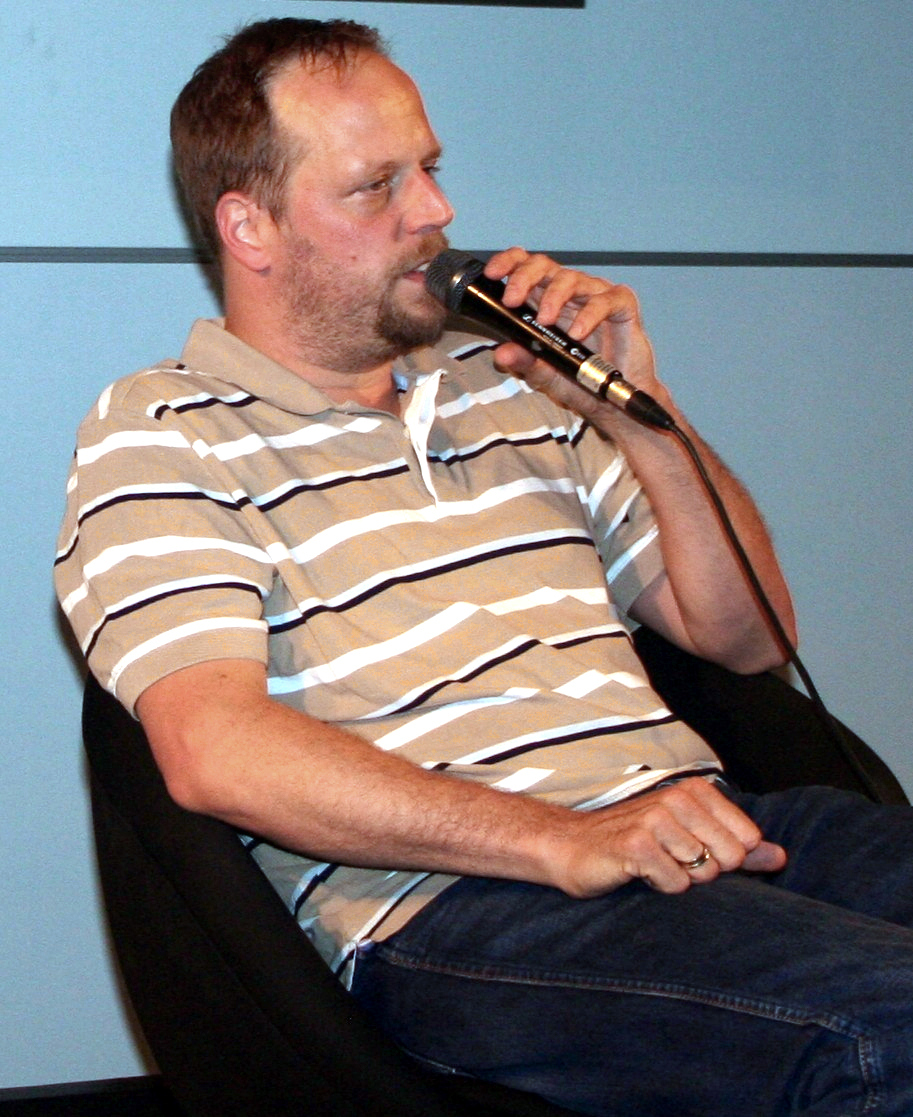
Smudo

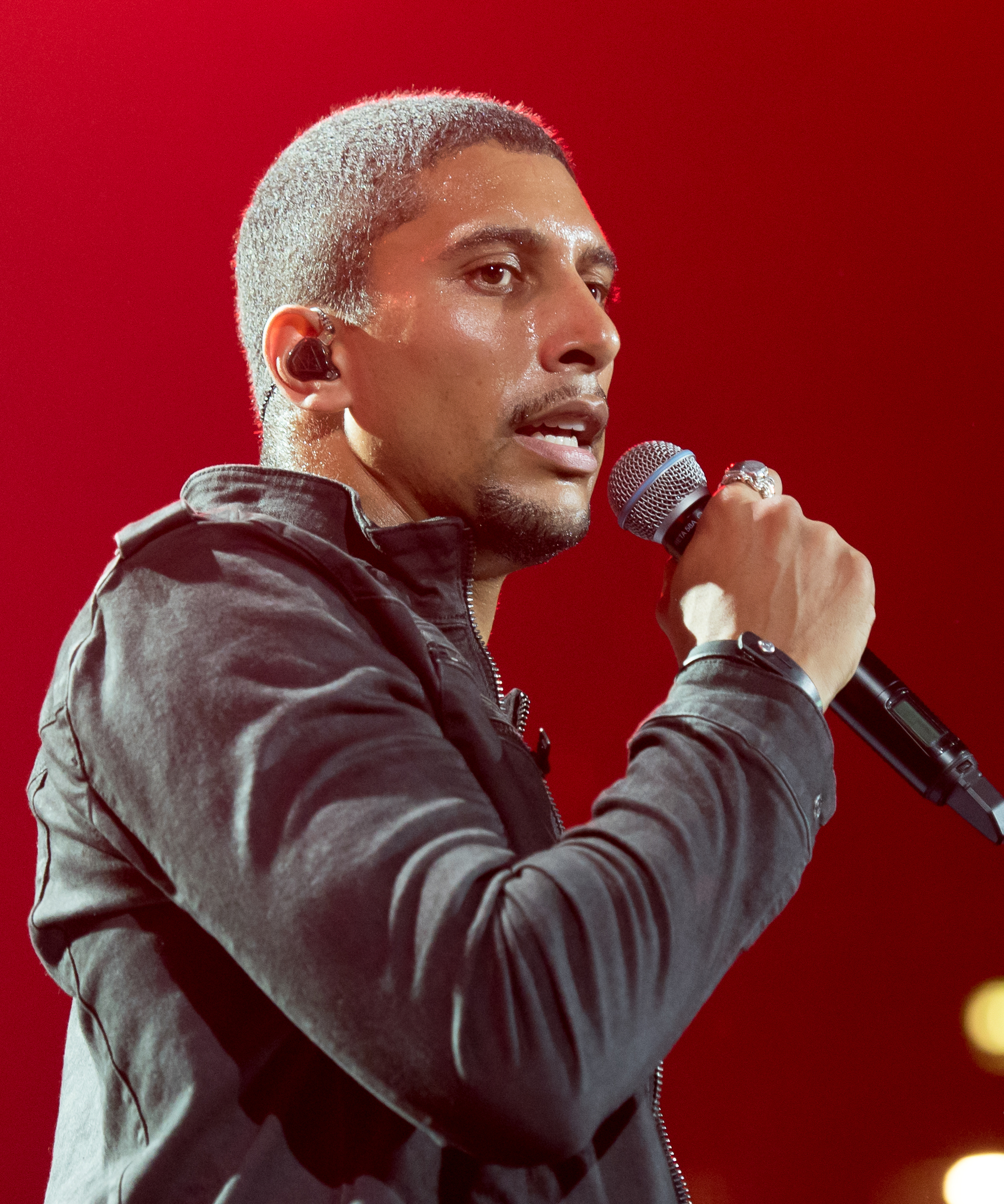
Andreas Bourani

== Teams ==
- Winner
- Runner-up
- Third place
- Fourth place
- Eliminated in the Semi-final
- Eliminated in the Quarterfinal
- Eliminated in the Knockout rounds
- Stolen in the Battle rounds
- Eliminated in the Battle rounds

Coach	Top 68 Artists						
Rea Garvey							
Rea Garvey	Denise Beiler	Mary Summer	Joshua Harfst	Konstantin Kuhn	Alexander Wolff	Sarah Trumpfheller	Josephine Seehawer
Rea Garvey	Clara Rothländer	Oscar Ivo Ackermann	Мishka Mackova	~~Tiffany Kemp~~	~~Rachelle Jeanty~~	Mark Huschke	Gella Scheven
Rea Garvey	Jonny-Lee Möller	Roma Schneider	Sabrina Gerard	Die LADYs	Jonas Stuch		
Stefanie Kloß							
Stefanie Kloß	Isabel Ment	Dimi Rompos	Cheryl Vorsterman van Oijen	Mitchy & André Katawazi	Milos Malesevic	Rachelle Jeanty	Daniela Hertje
Stefanie Kloß	Julian Adler	Linus Bruhn	Cihan Morsünbül	~~Marlene Wieser~~	~~Mishka Mackova~~	~~Jaqueline Stürmer~~	Norman Strauss
Stefanie Kloß	Natascha Herrmann	Nastassja Andrearczyk	Mimi Elsässer	Markus Bremm	Anny & Lissy Klein		
Michi & Smudo							
Michi & Smudo	Jamie-Lee Kriewitz	Tobias Vorwerk	Matthias Nzola Zanquila	Jaqueline Stürmer	Jazzy Gudd	Azim Touré & Robin Carpe	Elly Vardanian
Michi & Smudo	Dijana Dashari	Carl Ellis	Alegra Weng	~~Julian Adler~~	~~Mary Summer~~	Dany Fernandez Peralta & Steve vom Wege	Cuba Stern Jr
Michi & Smudo	Ute Ullrich	Anja Backus	Johannes Leis-Bendorff	Lisa Carter	Meike Rosendahl		
Andreas Bourani							
Andreas Bourani	Ayke Witt	Tiffany Kemp	Michael Bauereiß	Aitana Zienert Navas	Rebecca Strumpen	Can Yalin	Lamin Chaib
Andreas Bourani	Marlene Wieser	Samuel Türksoy	Alicia-Awa Beissert	~~Dijana Dashari~~	Debby van Dooren	Markus Buck	Anna Zuegg
Andreas Bourani	Sarah-Ann Stenglein	SameDay Records	Anina Sara Baumgartner	Nicole Bazan	Andrea Zug		
Note: Italicized names are stolen artists (names struck through within former teams).

== The Blind Auditions ==
The castings for the fifth season took place in February and March 2015, but were not shown on television. The Blind Auditions were recorded at the Studio Adlershof in Berlin from July 6 to 9, 2015 and were broadcast on eight television programs from October 15 to November 6, 2015. The jury selected 68 candidates, including four duos and two trios. Each team was filled with 17 participants.

=== Episode 1 (October 15) ===
Order	Artist	Song	Coach's and artist's choices			
Order	Artist	Song	Rea	Stefanie	Michi & Smudo	Andreas
1	Ayke Witt	"Flash mich"	✔	✔	✔	✔
2	Anna Oberauer	"Heartbeat Song"	–	–	–	–
3	Matthias Nzola Zanquila	"Jealous"	✔	✔	✔	✔
4	Natascha Herrmann	"Whole Lotta Love"	✔	✔	✔	✔
5	Ronas Alp.	"Nicht von dieser Welt"	–	–	–	–
6	Sabrina Gerard	"Flowerduet"	✔	✔	✔	–
7	Linus Bruhn	"A Thousand Miles"	–	✔	–	✔
8	Marco Alt	"Tonight"	–	–	–	–
9	Jamie Lee-Kriewitz	"The Hanging Tree"	✔	✔	✔	✔
10	SameDay Records	"Friday I'm In Love"	–	✔	✔	✔
11	Helin Ag	"One Last Time"	–	–	–	–
12	Denise Beiler	"Flashlight"	✔	✔	✔	✔

=== Episode 2 (October 16) ===
Order	Artist	Song	Coach's and artist's choices			
Order	Artist	Song	Rea	Stefanie	Michi & Smudo	Andreas
1	Nicole Basan	"And I Am Telling You I'm Not Going"	–	✔	✔	✔
2	Azim & Robin	"Word Up"	✔	✔	✔	–
3	Jesse Rathgeber	"Listen"	–	–	–	–
4	Mishka Mackova	"Salvation"	✔	✔	✔	✔
5	Emmo Acer	"Can't Stop Lovin' You"	–	–	–	–
6	Marc Huschke	"Lullaby Of Birdland"	✔	✔	✔	✔
7	Samantha Kronz	"Worth It"	–	–	–	–
8	Timo Buttendorf	"Dein Ist Mein Ganzes Herz"	–	–	–	–
9	Elly Vardanian	"Creep"	–	✔	✔	✔
10	Sarah Trumpfheller	"Going Under"	✔	✔	–	–
11	Anina Sara Baumgartner	"Ultraleicht"	–	–	–	✔
12	Chris Tyrone	"Regulate"	–	–	–	–
13	Cheryl Vorsterman van Oijen	"Get Away"	✔	✔	✔	✔

=== Episode 3 (October 22) ===
Order	Artist	Song	Coach's and artist's choices			
Order	Artist	Song	Rea	Stefanie	Michi & Smudo	Andreas
1	Michael Bauereiß	"Magneten"	–	✔	✔	✔
2	Jong David Lee	"Bad Day"	–	–	–	–
3	Gella Scheven	"Everytime"	✔	✔	–	–
4	Tiffany Kemp	"Bills"	✔	✔	✔	✔
5	Elias Barzinpour	"Upside Down"	–	–	–	–
6	Caddy Tschiedel	"When You're Gone"	–	–	–	–
7	Dimi Rompos	"Cry Me A River"	✔	✔	✔	✔
8	Konstantin Kuhn	"Stand by My Woman"	✔	✔	✔	✔
9	Nicole Jorgenson	"Searchin' My Soul"	–	–	–	–
10	Markus Buck	"Sing"	–	✔	✔	✔
11	Milos Malesevic	"I Wonder Why"	–	✔	✔	–
12	Anny & Lissy	"Blank Space"	✔	✔	✔	✔

=== Episode 4 (October 23) ===
Order	Artist	Song	Coach's and artist's choices			
Order	Artist	Song	Rea	Stefanie	Michi & Smudo	Andreas
1	Iris Romen	"Sweet Dreams"	–	–	–	–
2	Rachelle Jeanty	"I Wish"	✔	✔	✔	✔
3	Mino Westhauser	"Am Seidenen Faden"	–	–	–	–
4	Clara Rothländer	"Better Than Yourself"	✔	✔	–	✔
5	Lisa Carter	"What's Love Got to Do with It"	–	✔	✔	–
6	Hannah Röger	"Kribbeln im Bauch"	–	–	–	–
7	Cihan Morsünbül	"Dann Bin Ich Zu Haus"	✔	✔	–	✔
8	Ute Ullrich	"Holding Back the Years"	–	–	✔	–
9	Daniel Oliveira	"Jeremy"	–	–	–	–
10	Andrea Zug	"When Love Comes To Town"	–	✔	–	✔
11	Oscar Ivo Ackermann	"Heimat"	✔	✔	–	–
12	Victoria Benesch	"Troublemaker"	–	–	–	–
13	Carl Ellis	"Dance with My Father"	–	✔	✔	✔

=== Episode 5 (October 29) ===
Order	Artist	Song	Coach's and artist's choices			
Order	Artist	Song	Rea	Stefanie	Michi & Smudo	Andreas
1	Samuel Türksoy	"Human Nature"	–	✔	–	✔
2	Saskia Kirjakov	"Wie Schön Du Bist"	–	–	–	–
3	Tobias Vorwerk	"Home"	✔	✔	✔	✔
4	Die LADYs	"Roar"	✔	–	–	–
5	Amanda Lopez Moreno	"Dear Future Husband"	–	–	–	–
6	Jazzy Gudd	"Schlaflos"	–	✔	✔	–
7	Niki Leaf	"Make You Feel My Love"	–	–	–	–
8	Alicia-Awa Beissert	"FourFiveSeconds"	✔	✔	✔	✔
9	Mimi Elsässer	"Blaue Augen"	–	✔	–	–
10	Mitchy & André	"Shut Up and Dance"	–	✔	–	✔
11	Debby van Dooren	"One"	–	–	–	✔
12	Steffen Frommberger	"Alles Rot"	–	–	–	–
13	Josephine Seehawer	"Wake Me Up"	✔	✔	–	✔

=== Episode 6 (October 30) ===
Order	Artist	Song	Coach's and artist's choices			
Order	Artist	Song	Rea	Stefanie	Michi & Smudo	Andreas
1	Anja Backus	"Hands Clean"	–	✔	✔	–
2	Jonas Stuch	"See You Again"	✔	–	–	–
3	Steve & Dany	"King"	–	✔	✔	✔
4	Tatjana Uschakowa	"Mr. Brightside"	–	–	–	–
5	Isabel Ment	"We Built This City"	✔	✔	✔	✔
6	Aitana Zienert Navas	"Together"	✔	✔	–	✔
7	Michael Wurst	"Spinner"	–	–	–	–
8	Mary Summer	"Where Is the Love?"	–	✔	✔	–
9	Marlene Wieser	"Never Forget You"	–	✔	–	–
10	Lilli Fichtner	"Mit Jedem Deiner Fehler"	–	–	–	–
11	Norman Strauss	"Into The Wide Open"	–	✔	–	–
12	Simon Zenzen	"Broken"	–	–	–	–
13	Lamin Chaib	"Was Immer Du Willst"	✔	✔	–	✔

=== Episode 7 (November 5) ===
Order	Artist	Song	Coach's and artist's choices			
Order	Artist	Song	Rea	Stefanie	Michi & Smudo	Andreas
1	Meike Rosendahl	"Something's Got a Hold on Me"	–	✔	✔	✔
2	Can Yalin	"I Look to You"	✔	–	–	✔
3	Anuschka Weber	"No Ordinary Love"	–	–	–	–
4	Jaqueline Stürmer	"Best Thing I Never Had"	–	✔	–	–
5	Thomas Gundert	"If You're Gone"	–	–	–	–
6	Joshua Harfst	"Georgia"	✔	✔	–	✔
7	Victoria Mertsch	"Fallin' for You"	–	–	–	–
8	Jonny-Lee Möller	"When Susannah Cries"	✔	✔	✔	✔
9	Sarah-Ann Stenglein	"Lieber So"	–	–	–	✔
10	Pia Baresch	"Hunting High and Low"	–	–	–	–
11	Markus Bremm	"Herz Über Kopf"	✔	✔	–	–
12	Cuba Stern Junior	"Lay Me Down"	–	–	✔	–
13	Angelina Herrmann	"Who Knew"	–	–	–	–
14	Julian Adler	"Halt Mich"	–	✔	✔	–

=== Episode 8 (November 6) ===
Order	Artist	Song	Coach's and artist's choices			
Order	Artist	Song	Rea	Stefanie	Michi & Smudo	Andreas
1	Daniela Hertje	"Can't Get You Out of My Head"	–	✔	✔	–
2	Roma Schneider	"Love Me like You Do"	✔	–	–	–
3	Rebecca Strumpen	"Ein Kompliment"	–	✔	✔	✔
4	Julia Ponholzer	"In the End"	–	–	–	–
5	Alegra Weng	"The Voice Within"	–	✔	✔	✔
6	Anna Zuegg	"Turning Tables"	–	✔	–	✔
7	Alexander Wolff	"Haven't Met You Yet"	✔	–	✔	–
8	Nastassja Andrearczyk	"California Dreamin'"	Team full	✔	–	–
9	Andre Page	"Man in the Mirror"	Team full	Team full	–	–
10	Johannes Leis-Bendorff	"Daydream Believer"	Team full	Team full	✔	–
11	Dijana Jashari	"No Diggity"	Team full	Team full	Team full	✔

== The Battles ==
The Battle Round was recorded on 1 and 2 September 2015 in Berlin and broadcast from 12 to 20 November 2015 in four episodes. Within each team, the 17 candidates were divided into seven one-on-one duels and a triple battle. The respective coach chose one of the Battle participants as the winner and came directly into the Knockout. As seen in the third and fourth season, the losing candidates could have the chance to be stolen by another coaches. All four coaches each took two candidates from the triple battle, so after the Battles, ten participants per team went into the Knockout.

Color key:

Participants won the Battle and advanced to the Knockouts
Participants lost the Battle but was stolen by another coach and advanced to the Knockouts
Participants lost the Battle and was eliminated

Episode	Coach	Order	Winner	Song	Loser	'Steal' result			
Episode	Coach	Order	Winner	Song	Loser	Rea	Stefanie	Michi & Smudo	Andreas
9	Rea Garvey	1	Denise Beiler	"Hedonism (Just Because You Feel Good)"	Rachelle Jeanty	—N/a		—	—
9	Andreas Bourani	2	Can Yalin	"9 Crimes"	Debby van Dooren	—	—	—	—N/a
9	Stefanie Kloß	3	Dimi Rompos	"Changing"	Marlene Wieser	—	—N/a	—	
9	Michi & Smudo	4	Carl Ellis	"The World's Greatest"	Cuba Stern Junior	—	—	—N/a	—
9	Stefanie Kloß	5	Isabel Ment	"Hero"	Norman Strauss	—	—N/a	—	—
9	Andreas Bourani	6	Alicia-Awa Beissert	"1 Thing"	Dijana Jashari	—	—		—N/a
9	Rea Garvey	7	Alexander Wolff	"My Way"	Marc Huschke	—N/a	—	—	—
10	Stefanie Kloß	1	Cheryl Vorsterman van Oijen	"Don't Let Go (Love)"	Jaqueline Stürmer	—	—N/a		—
10	Andreas Bourani	2	Michael Bauereiß	"You Get What You Give"	Markus Buck	—	—	Team full	—N/a
10	Rea Garvey	3	Clara Rothländer	"Hold My Hand"	Gella Scheven & Jonny-Lee Möller	—N/a	—	Team full	—
10	Michi & Smudo	4	Elly Vardanian	"Glory Box"	Ute Ullrich	—	—	Team full	—
10	Stefanie Kloß	5	Milos Malesevic	"Cryin'"	Natascha Herrmann	—	—N/a	Team full	—
10	Andreas Bourani	6	Samuel Türksoy	"Photograph"	Anna Zuegg	—	—	Team full	—N/a
10	Stefanie Kloß	7	Mitchy & André Katawaz	"Uptown Funk"	Nastassja Andrearczyk	—	—N/a	Team full	—
10	Rea Garvey	8	Konstantin Kuhn	"Back to Black"	Tiffany Kemp	—N/a	—	Team full	
11	Stefanie Kloß	1	Cihan Morsünbül	"Ich will nur"	Mimi Elsässer & Markus Bremm	—	—N/a	Team full	Team full
11	Michi & Smudo	2	Matthias Nzola Zanquila	"Am I Wrong"	Mary Summer		—	Team full	Team full
11	Andreas Bourani	3	Lamin Chaib	"Nichts geht mehr"	Sarah-Ann Stenglein	—	—	Team full	Team full
11	Rea Garvey	4	Joshua Harfst	"Hold Back the River"	Roma Schneider	—N/a	—	Team full	Team full
11	Stefanie Kloß	5	Linus Bruhn	"Riptide"	Anny & Lissy Klein	—	—N/a	Team full	Team full
11	Michi & Smudo	6	Jazzy Gudd	"Fühlt sich wie fliegen an"	Julian Adler	—		Team full	Team full
11	Andreas Bourani	7	Aitana Zienert Navas	"Little Talks"	SameDay Records	—	Team full	Team full	Team full
11	Michi & Smudo	8	Alegra Weng	"Stadt"	Anja Backus & Johannes Leis-Bendorff	—	Team full	Team full	Team full
11	Rea Garvey	9	Sarah Trumpfheller	"Angels"	Sabrina Gerard	—N/a	Team full	Team full	Team full
12	Michi & Smudo	1	Tobias Vorwerk	"Hey Ya!"	Lisa Carter	—	Team full	Team full	Team full
12	Andreas Bourani	2	Ayke Witt	"Keinen Zentimeter"	Anina Sara Baumgartner	—	Team full	Team full	Team full
12	Rea Garvey	3	Oscar Ivo Ackermann	"Venus"	Die LADYs	—N/a	Team full	Team full	Team full
12	Michi & Smudo	4	Azim Touré und Robin Carpe	"Like I Love You"	Dany Fernandez Peralta & Steve vom Wege	—	Team full	Team full	Team full
12	Stefanie Kloß	5	Daniela Hertje	"Lovefool"	Mishka Mackova		Team full	Team full	Team full
12	Andreas Bourani	6	Rebecca Strumpen	"The Best"	Nicole Basan & Andrea Zug	Team full	Team full	Team full	Team full
12	Rea Garvey	7	Josephine Seehawer	"Counting Stars"	Jonas Stuch	Team full	Team full	Team full	Team full
12	Michi & Smudo	8	Jamie-Lee Kriewitz	"Royals"	Meike Rosendahl	Team full	Team full	Team full	Team full

== Final ==
Rang #	Coach	Contestant	Songs		Televoting and Downloads in %
1.	Michi & Smudo	Jamie-Lee Kriewitz	Winner Single	"Ghost"	38,29
1.	Michi & Smudo	Jamie-Lee Kriewitz	Duet with Guest Artist	"Take Me Home" with Jess Glynne	38,29
2.	Andreas Bourani	Ayke Witt	Winner Single	"Bis gleich"	22,95
2.	Andreas Bourani	Ayke Witt	Duet with Guest Artist	"Melodie" with Cro	22,95
3.	Andreas Bourani	Tiffany Kemp	Winner Single	"Have You Ever Been In Love"	21,88
3.	Andreas Bourani	Tiffany Kemp	Duet with Guest Artist	"Stay Like This" with James Morrison	21,88
4.	Stefanie Kloß	Isabel Ment	Winner Single	"In Reverse"	16,89
4.	Stefanie Kloß	Isabel Ment	Duet with Guest Artist	"Army" with Ellie Goulding	16,89

== Contestants who appeared on previous season ==
- Dany Fernandez Peralta & Steve vom Wege participated (separately) in last season, but no one coach turned for them.
