= Bennigsen Beavers =

Coordinates: 52.242°N 9.6637°E

Information
- League: Verbandsliga
- Location: Springe
- Ballpark: Bennigsen Beavers Ballpark
- Founded: 1993
- League championships: None
- Former name(s): Bennigsen Beavers
- Colors: Red/White/Blue
- Website: www.bennigsenbeavers.de

The Bennigsen Beavers are a German baseball and softball team in the Springer Ortsteil Bennigsen, southwest of Hannover. The club has at points in the past participated in the first division of the Baseball Bundesliga The first men's team currently plays in the Verbandsliga, the 4th tier of baseball in Germany.

== History ==
The Bennigsen Beavers were established in 1993 as a department of FC Bennigsen, and became an independent sporting team on January 1, 2004. The club fielded 7 teams for the 2005 season, including three men's teams, a women's team, a junior team, a youth team and a student team. As of mid-2005, the Beavers claimed a total of 97 Members.

The first men's team was promoted to the first division of the Bundesliga for the 2003 season, with the women's team ascending to the first division of the women's bundesliga. In 2000 the Junior team finished 4th place in the German championships.
