= The Masked Singer Austria =

Austrian television series

- Genre: Reality television Game show
- Based on: King of Mask Singer by Munhwa Broadcasting Corporation
- Presented by: Arabella Kiesbauer; Mirjam Weichselbraun
- Starring: Elke Winkens; Nathan Trent; Sasa Schwarzjirg; Rainer Schönfelder
- Opening theme: "Who Are You" by The Who
- Country of origin: Austria
- Original language: German
- No. of seasons: 2
- No. of episodes: 12

Production
- Production locations: MMC Studios, Cologne
- Running time: approx. 110 to 135 minutes per episode (including commercials)
- Production companies: EndemolShine Germany, 4Entertainment

Original release
- Network: Puls 4
- Release: 14 March 2020 – 22 March 2021

Related
- Masked Singer franchise; King of Mask Singer; The Masked Singer (US)

The Masked Singer Austria is an Austrian reality singing competition television series adapted from the South Korean format King of Mask Singer. The first season premiered on Puls 4 on 14 March 2020, and is hosted by Arabella Kiesbauer. The show features celebrities singing in head-to-toe costumes and face masks which conceal their identities from other contestants, panelists, and an audience.

On 19 March 2020, Puls 4 announced that the production would be interrupted due to the COVID-19 pandemic in Austria. The program continued on 15 September 2020.

== Panelists and host ==
Current season panelists and host

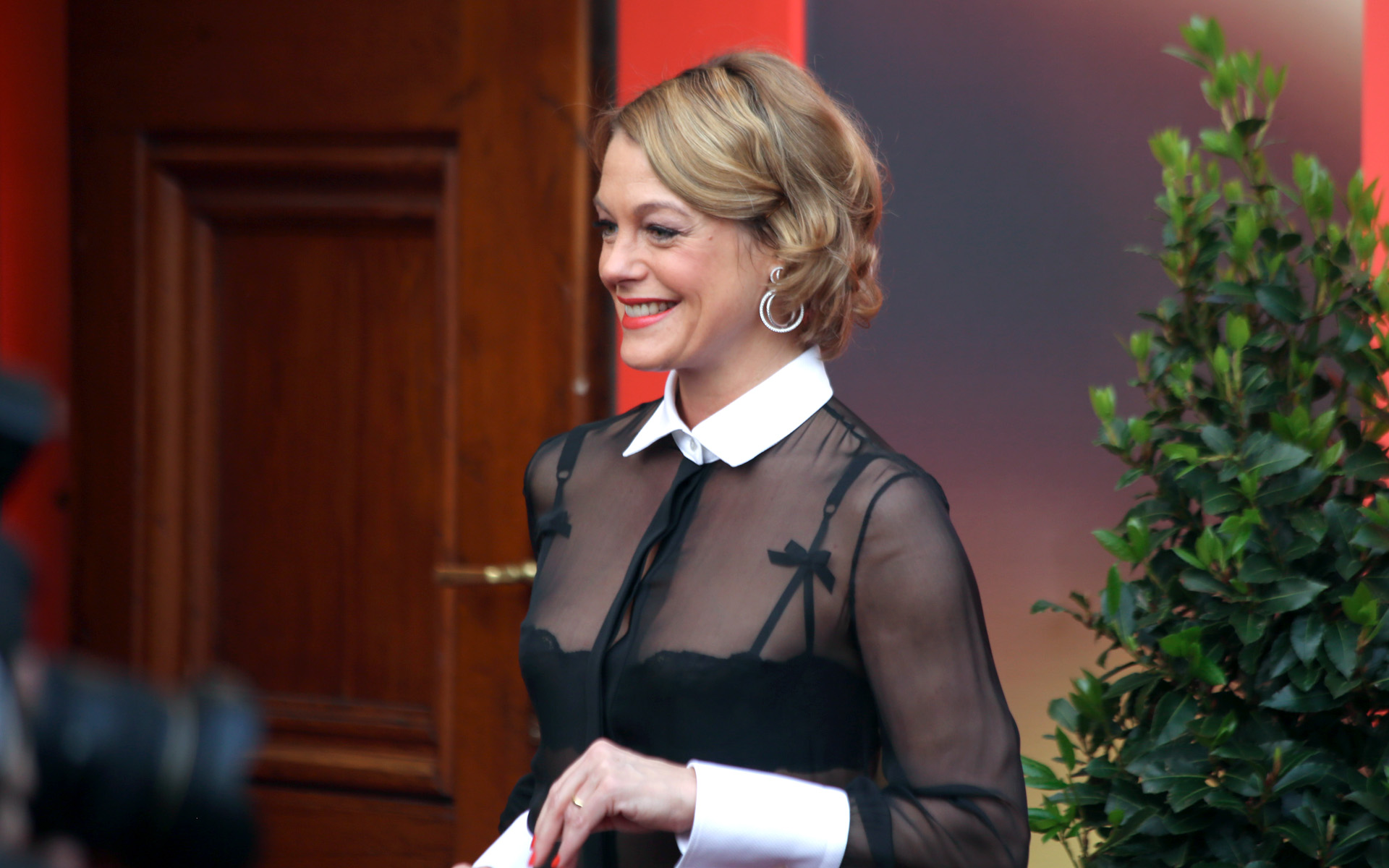
Elke Winkens

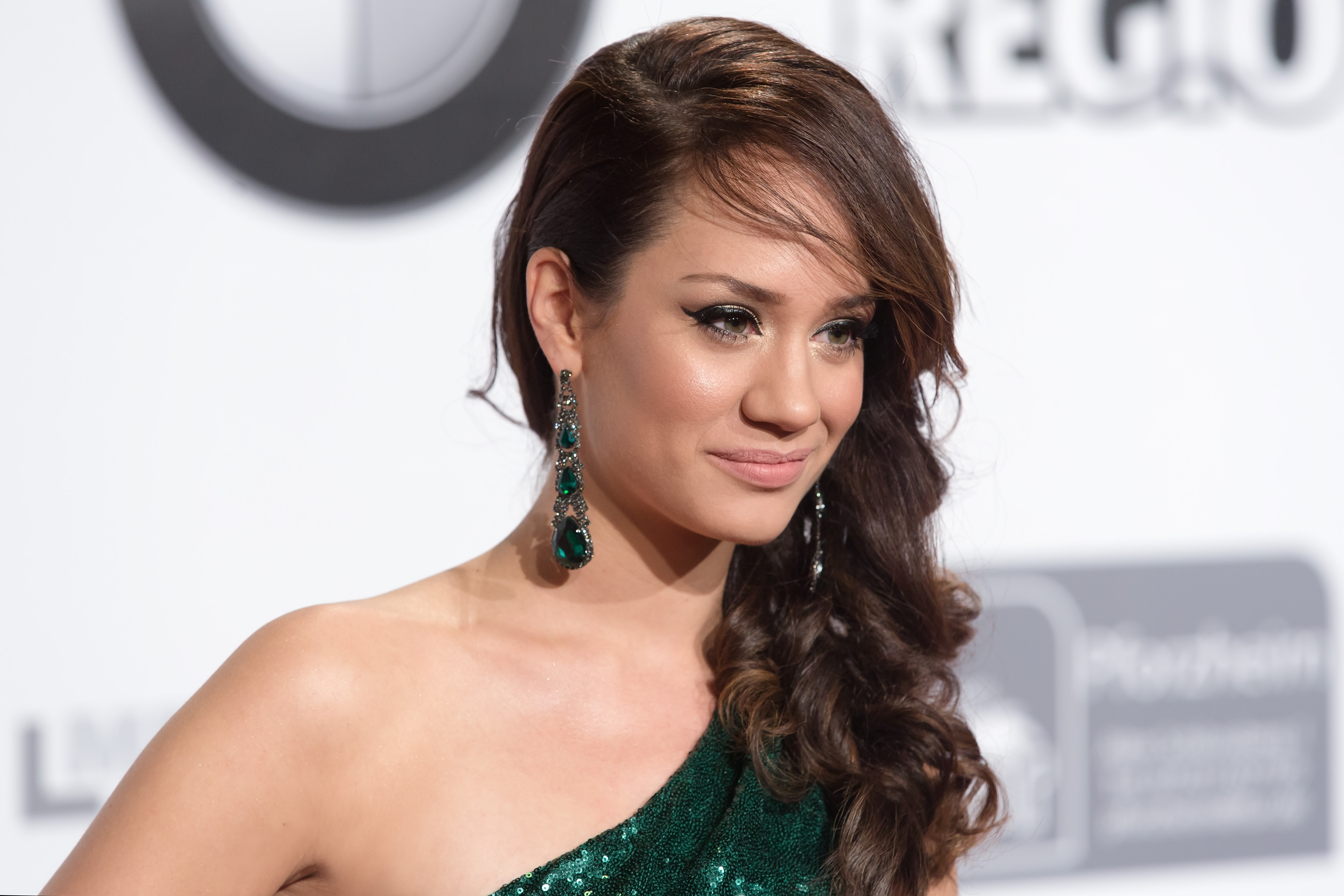
Sasa Schwarzjirg

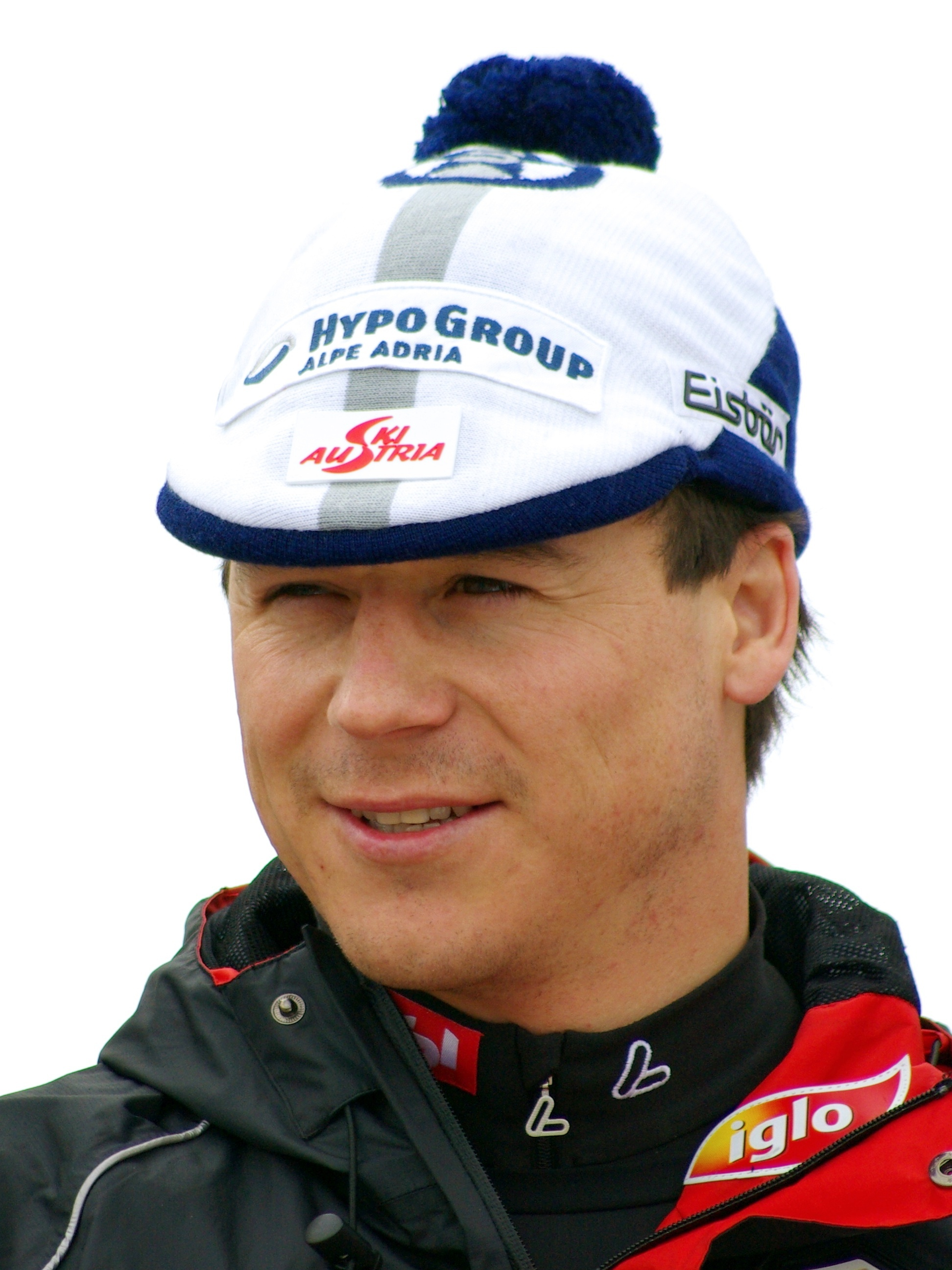
Rainer Schönfelder

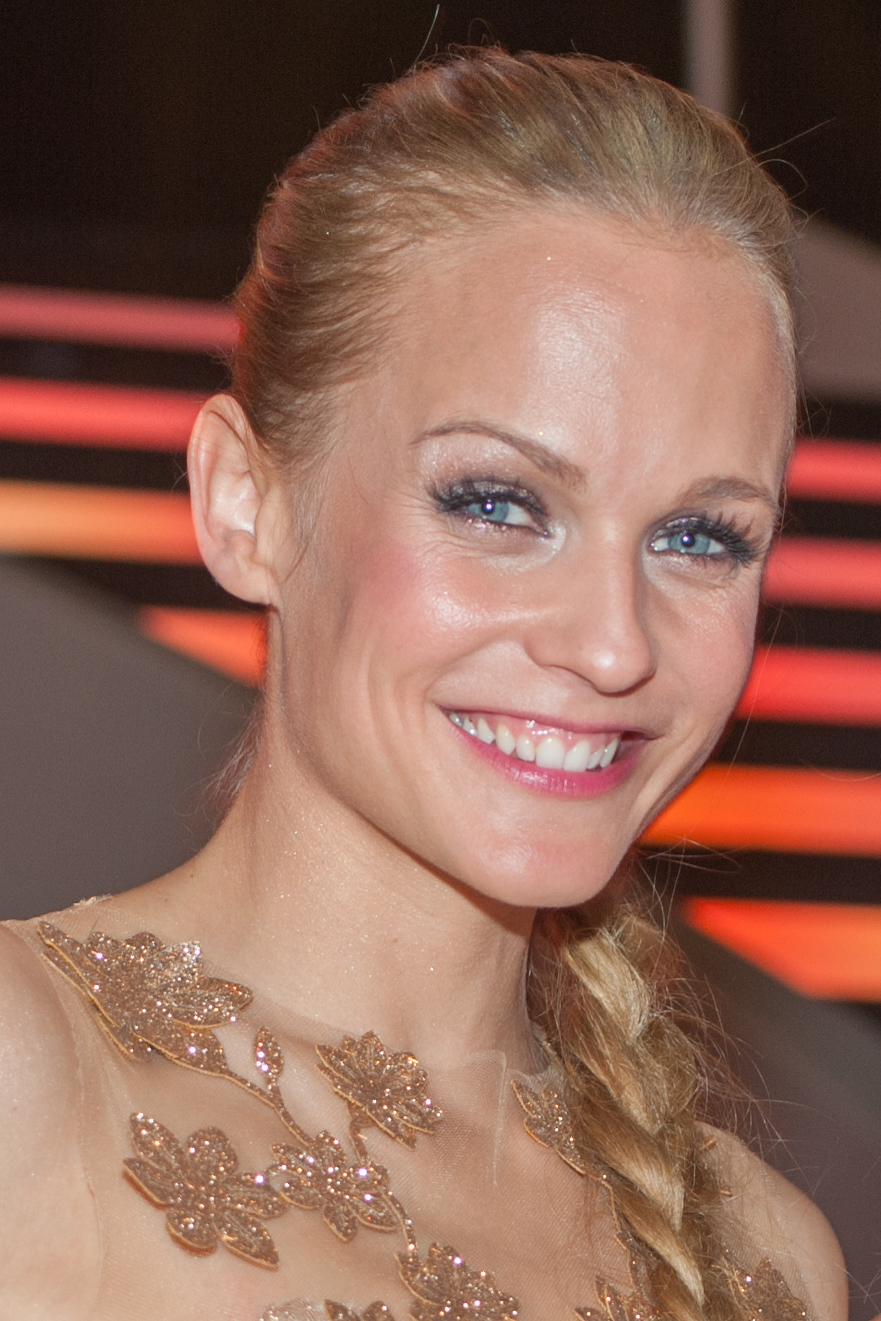
Mirjam Weichselbraun

Arabella Kiesbauer served as host of the series for its first season. Kiesbauer was replaced by Mirjam Weichselbraun for the second season. Since the first season, the panelists consist of Elke Winkens and Sasa Schwarzjirg. Nathan Trent served as a third panelist in the first season before being replaced by Rainer Schönfelder for the second.

Cast timeline
Cast	Seasons	
Cast	1	2
Hosts
Arabella Kiesbauer	Main	
Mirjam Weichselbraun		Main
Panelists
Elke Winkens	Main	Main
Sasa Schwarzjirg	Main	Main
Nathan Trent	Main	
Nazar	Guest	
Hans Sigl	Guest	
Josh.	Guest	Guest
Cesár Sampson	Guest	Mask
Gery Seidl	Guest	
Manuel Rubey	Guest	
Rainer Schönfelder	Mask	Main
Felix Neureuther		Guest
Nina Proll	Mask	Guest
Andy Borg		Guest
Ina Regen		Guest
Nadine Beiler	Mask	Guest

== Series overview ==
Series overview
Season	Celebrities	Episodes	Originally released		Winner	Runner-up	Third place
Season	Celebrities	Episodes	First released	Last released	Winner	Runner-up	Third place
1	8	6	March 14, 2020	October 13, 2020 (Note: This season was originally set to end on April 18, 2020 but was interrupted by the COVID-19 pandemic. It eventually resumed in September 2020, after a six-month hiatus.)	Nadine Beiler as "Yeti"	Simone Stelzer as "Lipizzaner"	Nina Proll as "Geistergräfin"
2	9	6	February 15, 2021	March 22, 2021	Sandra Pires as "Babyelefant"	Madita as "Donaunymphe"	Jakob Seebäck as "Gelse"

== Season 1 ==
Contestants

Stage name	Celebrity	Notability	Episodes						
Stage name	Celebrity	Notability	1	2	3	4	5	6	
Stage name	Celebrity	Notability	1	2	3	4	5	A	B
Yeti	Nadine Beiler	Singer	RISK	WIN	WIN	WIN	WIN	SAFE	WINNER
Lipizzaner	Simone Stelzer	Singer	WIN	WIN	WIN	WIN	RISK	SAFE	RUNNER-UP
Geistergräfin "Ghost Countess"	Nina Proll	Actress/singer	WIN	WIN	WIN	RISK	WIN	THIRD	
Karpfen "Carp"	Rainer Schönfelder	Retired Ski Racer	RISK	WIN	RISK	RISK	OUT		
Klimaheld "Climate Hero"	Lukas Plöchl	Rapper	WIN	RISK	RISK	OUT			
Katze "Cat"	Sabine Petzl	Actress	WIN	RISK	OUT				
Steinbock "Ibex"	Alfons Haider	Actor/singer	RISK	OUT					
Falke "Falcon"	James Cottriall	Musician/singer	OUT						

The masked singer won their face-off and remained in the competition.
The masked singer lost their face-off and was in the bottom three/two, but was not eliminated.
The masked singer was safe from elimination.
The masked singer was eliminated from the competition and unmasked upon their elimination.
- Carp is also known as Carp Diva
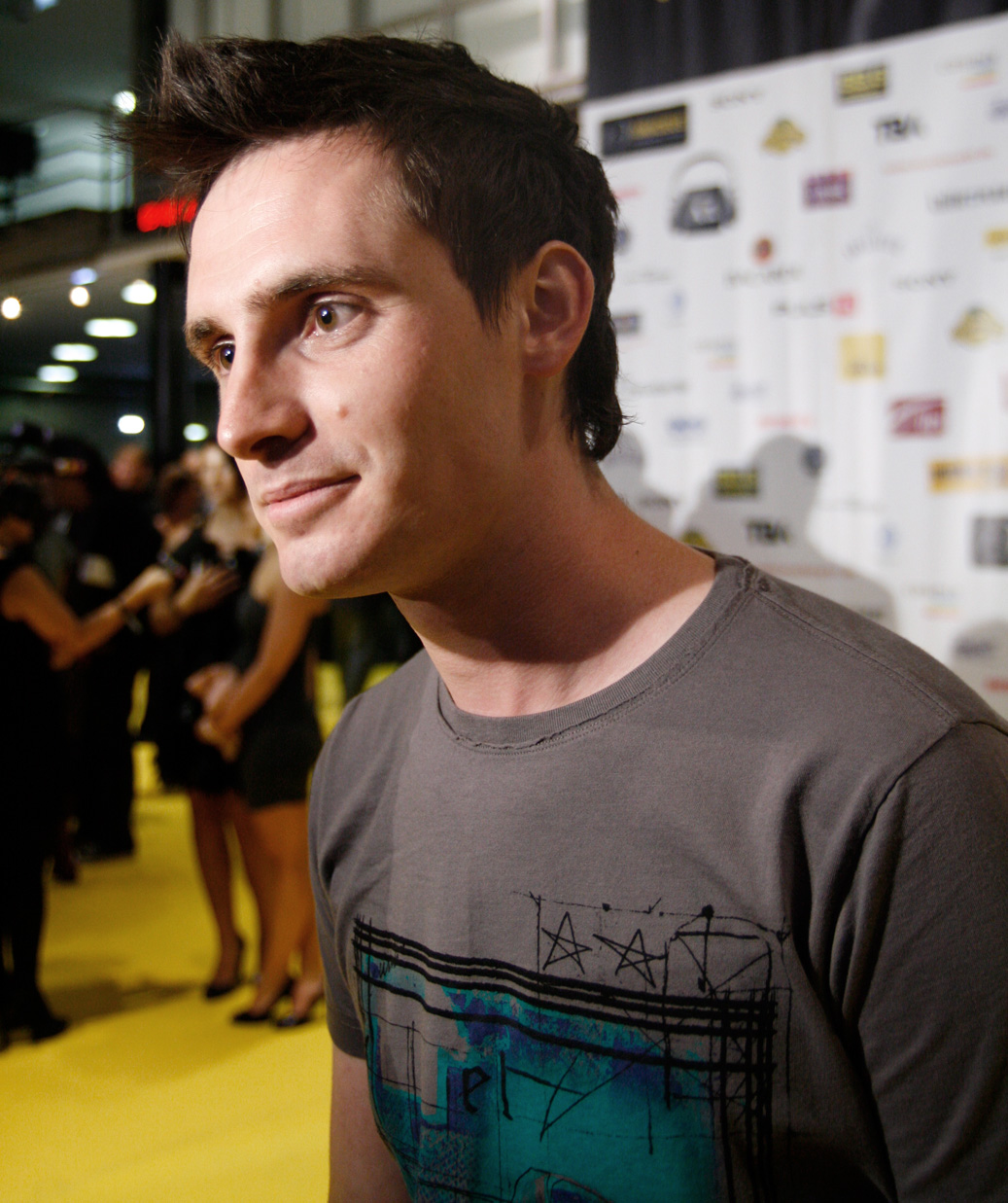
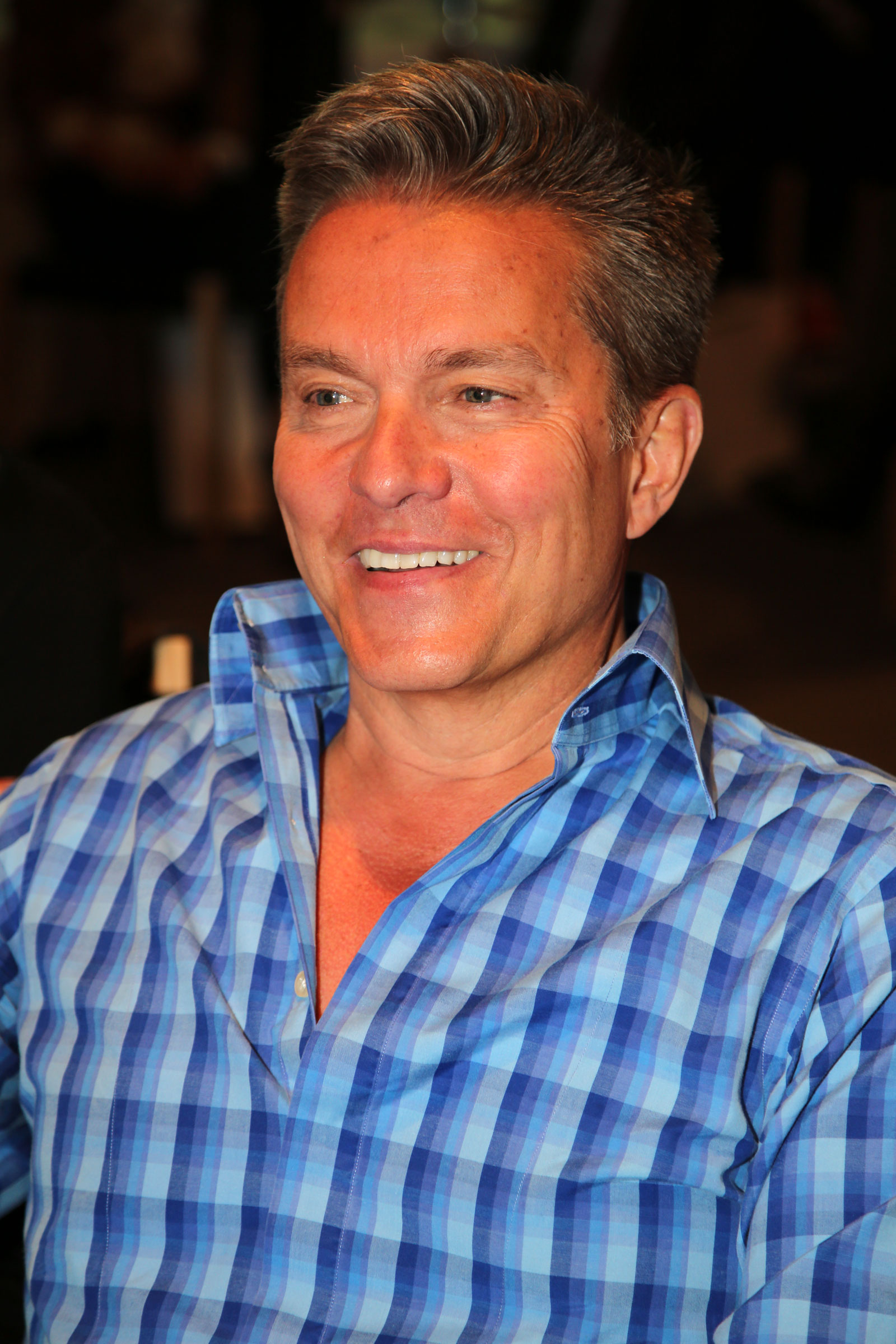
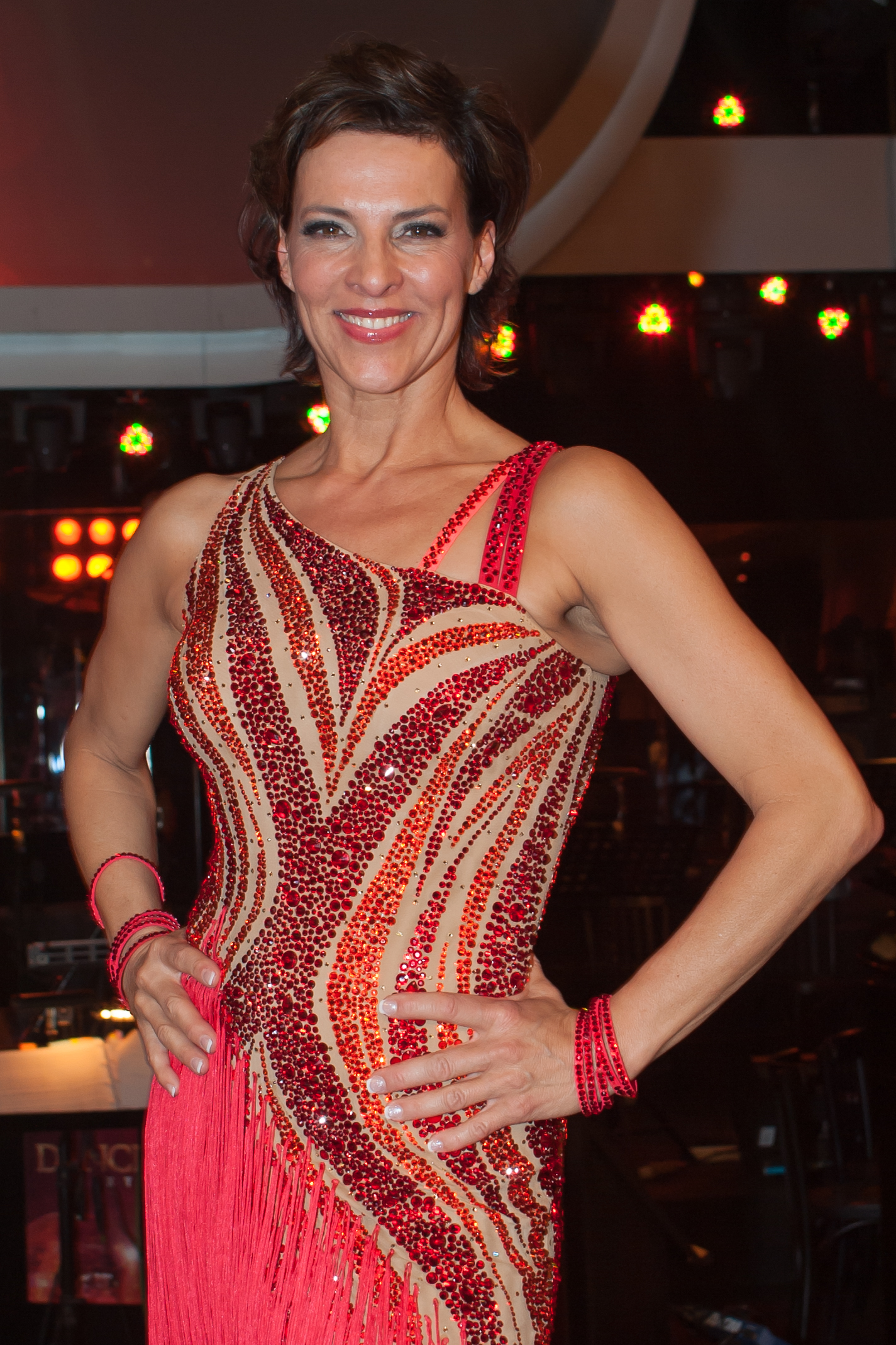
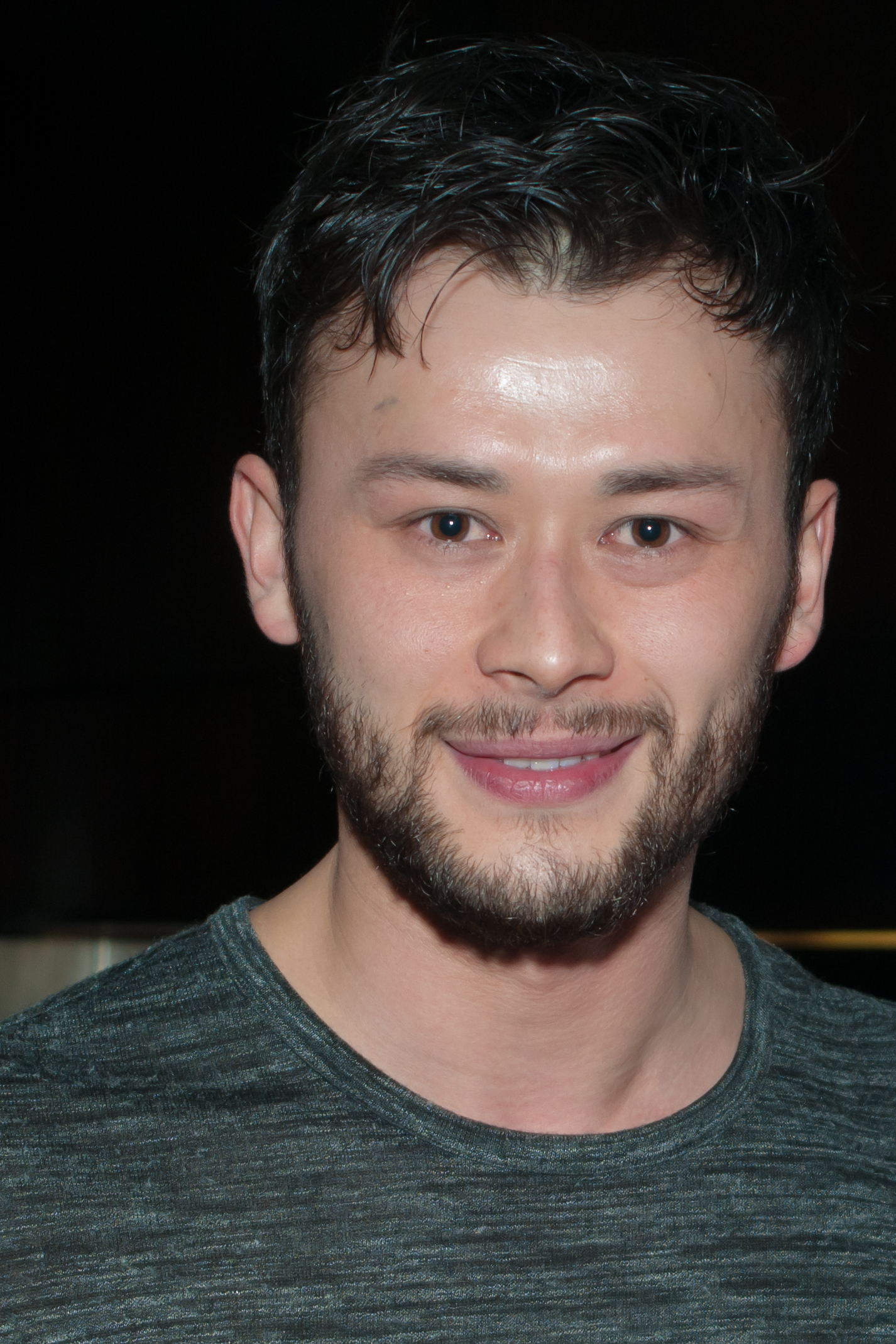
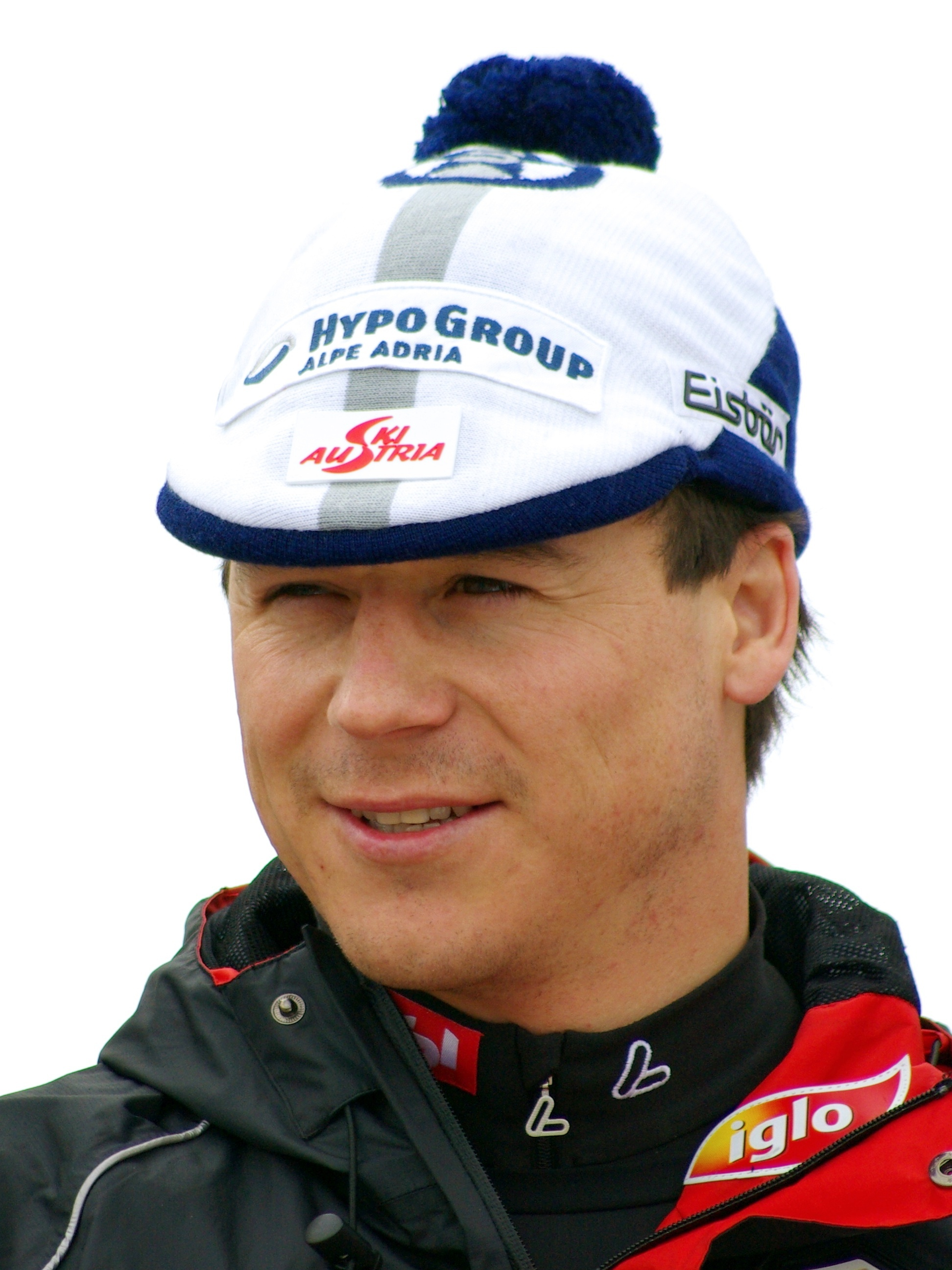
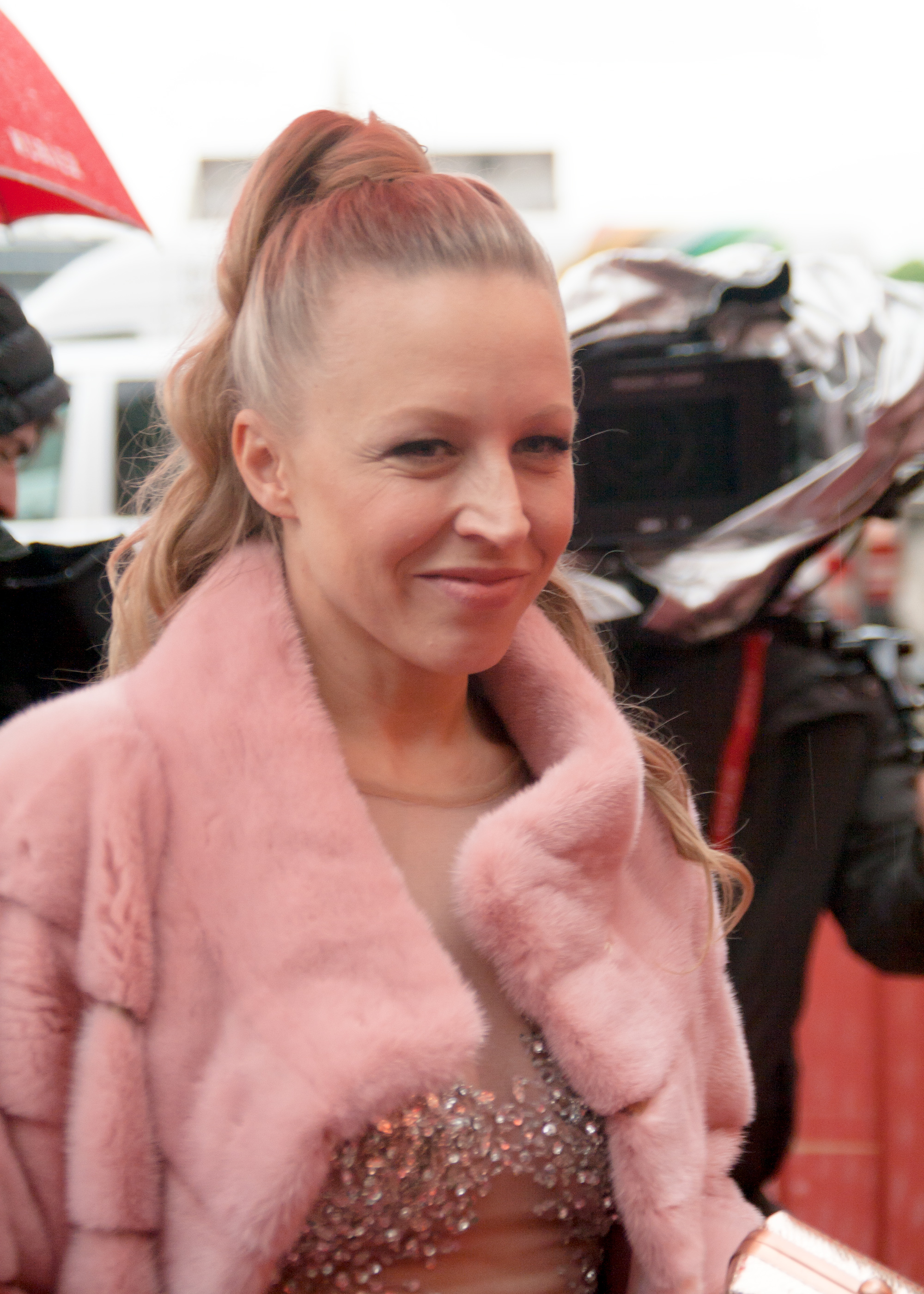
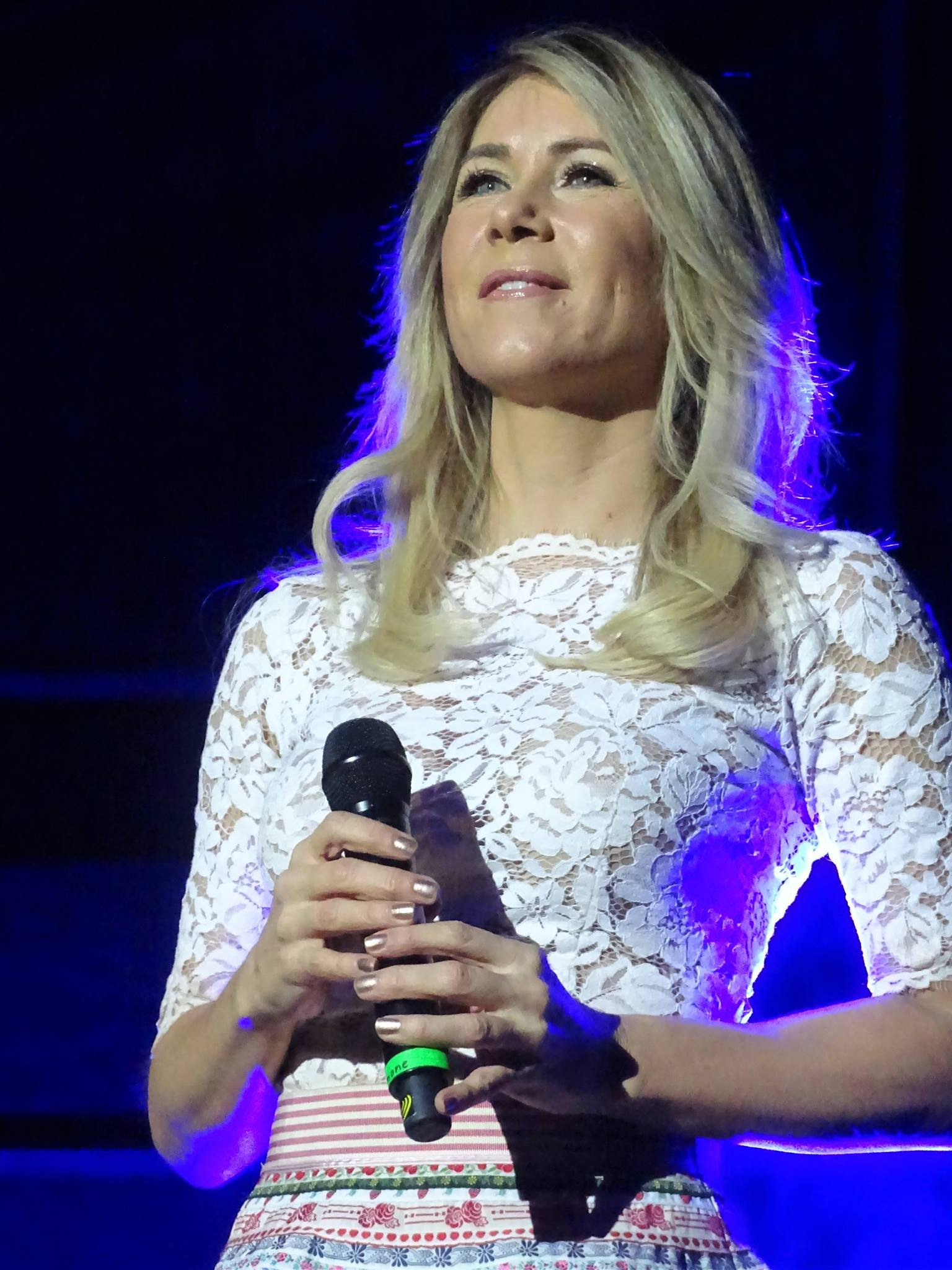
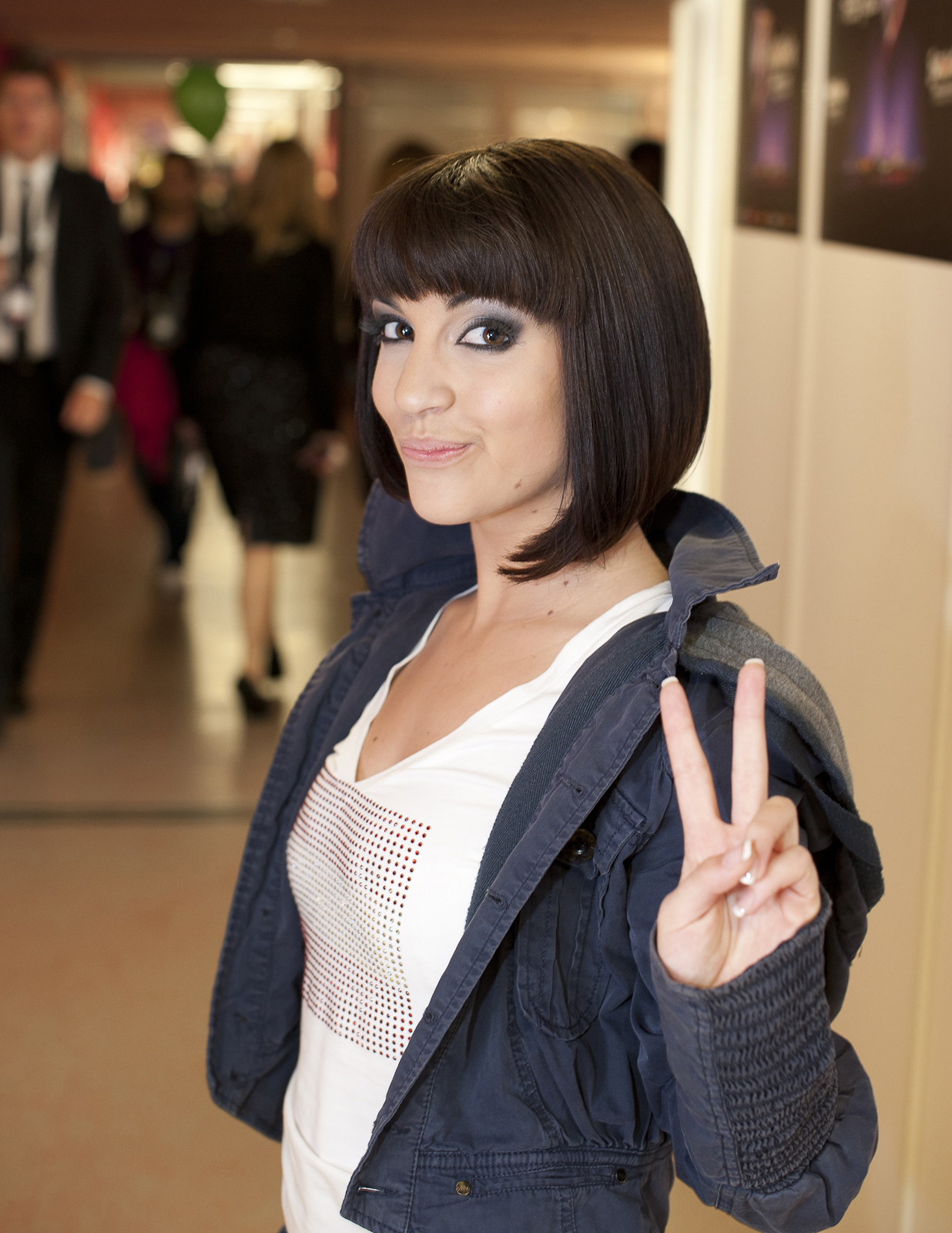
The celebrities who competed in the first season of The Masked Singer Austria, pictured in order of elimination (l-r):
James Cottriall ("Falcon"), Alfons Haider ("Ibex"), Sabine Petzl ("Cat"), Lukas Plöchl ("Climate Hero"), Rainer Schönfelder ("Carp"), Nina Proll ("Ghost Countess"), Simone Stelzer ("Lipizzaner"), Nadine Beiler ("Yeti").

Episodes

=== Week 1 (14 March) ===
Performances on the first episode
#	Stage name	Song	Identity	Result
1	Falke	"Junge Roemer" by Falco	James Cottriall	OUT
2	Geistergräfin	"Take Me to Church" by Hozier	undisclosed	WIN
3	Karpfen	"Diamonds" by Rihanna	undisclosed	RISK
4	Katze	"Your Song" by Elton John	undisclosed	WIN
5	Klimaheld	"Formidable" by Stromae	undisclosed	WIN
6	Steinbock	"Girl, You'll Be a Woman Soon" by Neil Diamond	undisclosed	RISK
7	Lipizzaner	"Listen to Your Heart" by Roxette	undisclosed	WIN
8	Yeti	"Supergirl" by Reamonn	undisclosed	RISK

=== Week 2 (15 September) ===
Performances on the second episode
#	Stage name	Song	Identity	Result
1	Lipizzaner	"Ex's & Oh's" by Elle King	undisclosed	WIN
2	Steinbock	"The Final Countdown" by Europe	Alfons Haider	OUT
3	Geistergräfin	"No Time to Die" by Billie Eilish	undisclosed	WIN
4	Karpfen	"Lady Marmalade" by Labelle	undisclosed	WIN
5	Klimaheld	"Skinny Love" by Bon Iver	undisclosed	RISK
6	Yeti	"Mercy" by Duffy	undisclosed	WIN
7	Katze	"Memory" from Cats	undisclosed	RISK

=== Week 3 (22 September) ===
Performances on the third episode
#	Stage name	Song	Result	
1	Katze	"Ich will immer wieder... dieses Fieber spür'n" by Helene Fischer	RISK	
2	Lipizzaner	"Wrecking Ball" by Miley Cyrus	WIN	
3	Karpfen	"Ai Se Eu Te Pego" by Michel Teló	RISK	
4	Yeti	"Valerie" by The Zutons	WIN	
5	Geistergräfin	"Heart of Glass" by Blondie	WIN	
6	Klimaheld	"Out of the Dark" by Falco	RISK	
Sing-off details			Identity	Result
1	Katze	"Believe" by Cher	Sabine Petzl	OUT
2	Karpfen	"I Kissed a Girl" by Katy Perry	undisclosed	SAFE
3	Klimaheld	"Say Something" by A Great Big World	undisclosed	SAFE

=== Week 4 (29 September) ===
Performances on the fourth episode
#	Stage name	Song	Result	
1	Karpfen	"Alles nur geklaut" by Die Prinzen	RISK	
2	Klimaheld	"Fix You" by Coldplay	RISK	
3	Lipizzaner	"Man! I Feel Like a Woman!" by Shania Twain	WIN	
4	Geistergräfin	"It's a Man's Man's Man's World" by James Brown	RISK	
5	Yeti	"Rise Like a Phoenix" by Conchita Wurst	WIN	
Sing-off details			Identity	Result
1	Karpfen	"In the Ghetto" by Elvis Presley	undisclosed	SAFE
2	Klimaheld	"Love Me like You Do" by Ellie Goulding	Lukas Plöchl	OUT
3	Geistergräfin	"Because of You" by Kelly Clarkson	undisclosed	SAFE

=== Week 5 (6 October) ===
Performances on the fifth episode
#	Stage name	Song	Result	
1	Yeti	"Elastic Heart" by Sia feat. The Weeknd and Diplo	WIN	
2	Karpfen	"Faith" by George Michael	RISK	
3	Geistergräfin	"Because the Night" by Patti Smith Group	WIN	
4	Lipizzaner	"Bad Romance" by Lady Gaga	RISK	
Sing-off details			Identity	Result
1	Karpfen	"Just a Gigolo" by Louis Prima	Rainer Schönfelder	OUT
2	Lipizzaner	"L'amour toujours" by Gigi D'Agostino	undisclosed	SAFE

=== Week 6 (13 October) – Final ===
Group Number: "Everybody Needs Somebody to Love" by The Blues Brothers

==== Round One ====
Performances on the final live episode – round one
#	Stage name	Song	Identity	Result
1	Geistergräfin	"Cry Me a River" by Justin Timberlake	Nina Proll	THIRD
2	Lipizzaner	"Cordula Grün" by Josh.	undisclosed	SAFE
3	Yeti	"Creep" by Radiohead	undisclosed	SAFE

==== Round Two ====
Performances on the final live episode – round two
#	Stage name	Song	Identity	Result
1	Lipizzaner	"Wrecking Ball" by Miley Cyrus	Simone Stelzer	RUNNER-UP
2	Yeti	"Rise Like a Phoenix" by Conchita Wurst	Nadine Beiler	WINNER

== Season 2 ==
Contestants

Stage name	Celebrity	Notability	Episodes							
Stage name	Celebrity	Notability	1	2	3	4	5		6	
Stage name	Celebrity	Notability	1	2	3	4	A	B	A	B
Babyelefant "Baby Elephant"	Sandra Pires	Singer	RISK	RISK	WIN	WIN	SAFE	WIN	SAFE	WINNER
Donaunymphe "Danube Siren"	Madita	Singer/actress	WIN	WIN	WIN	WIN	SAFE	WIN	SAFE	RUNNER-UP
Gelse "Mosquito"	Jakob Seeböck	Actor	WIN	WIN	RISK	RISK	SAFE	RISK	THIRD	
Frechdachs "Cheeky Badger"	Cesár Sampson	Singer	RISK	WIN	WIN	WIN	SAFE	OUT		
Weintraube "Grape"	Elisabeth Görgl	Retired Ski Racer	WIN	WIN	RISK	RISK	OUT			
Wackeldackel "Bobblehead"	Robert Almer	Former Footballer	WIN	RISK	WIN	OUT				
Germknödel "Yeast Dumpling"	Roberto Blanco	Singer & Actor	WIN	RISK	OUT					
Schaf "Sheep"	Nicole Beutler	Actress	RISK	OUT						
Wildschwein "Wild Boar"	Klaus Eberhartinger	Singer/actor/host	OUT							

The masked singer won their face-off and remained in the competition.
The masked singer lost their face-off and was in the bottom three/two, but was not eliminated.
The masked singer was safe from elimination.
The masked singer was eliminated from the competition and unmasked upon their elimination.
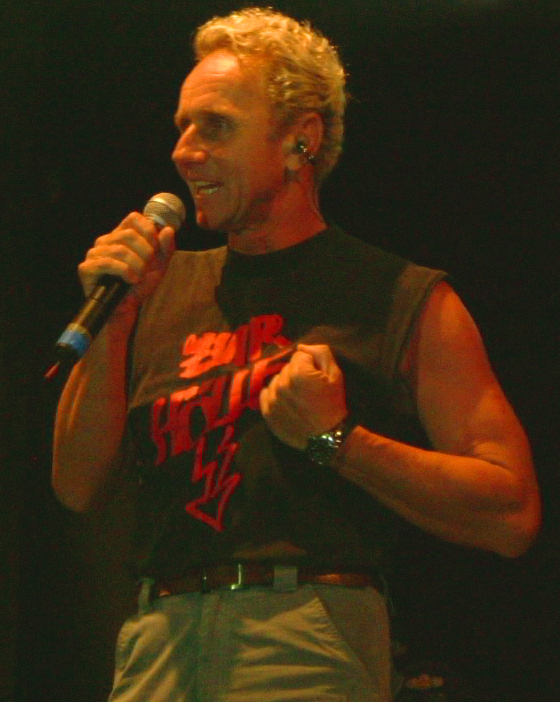
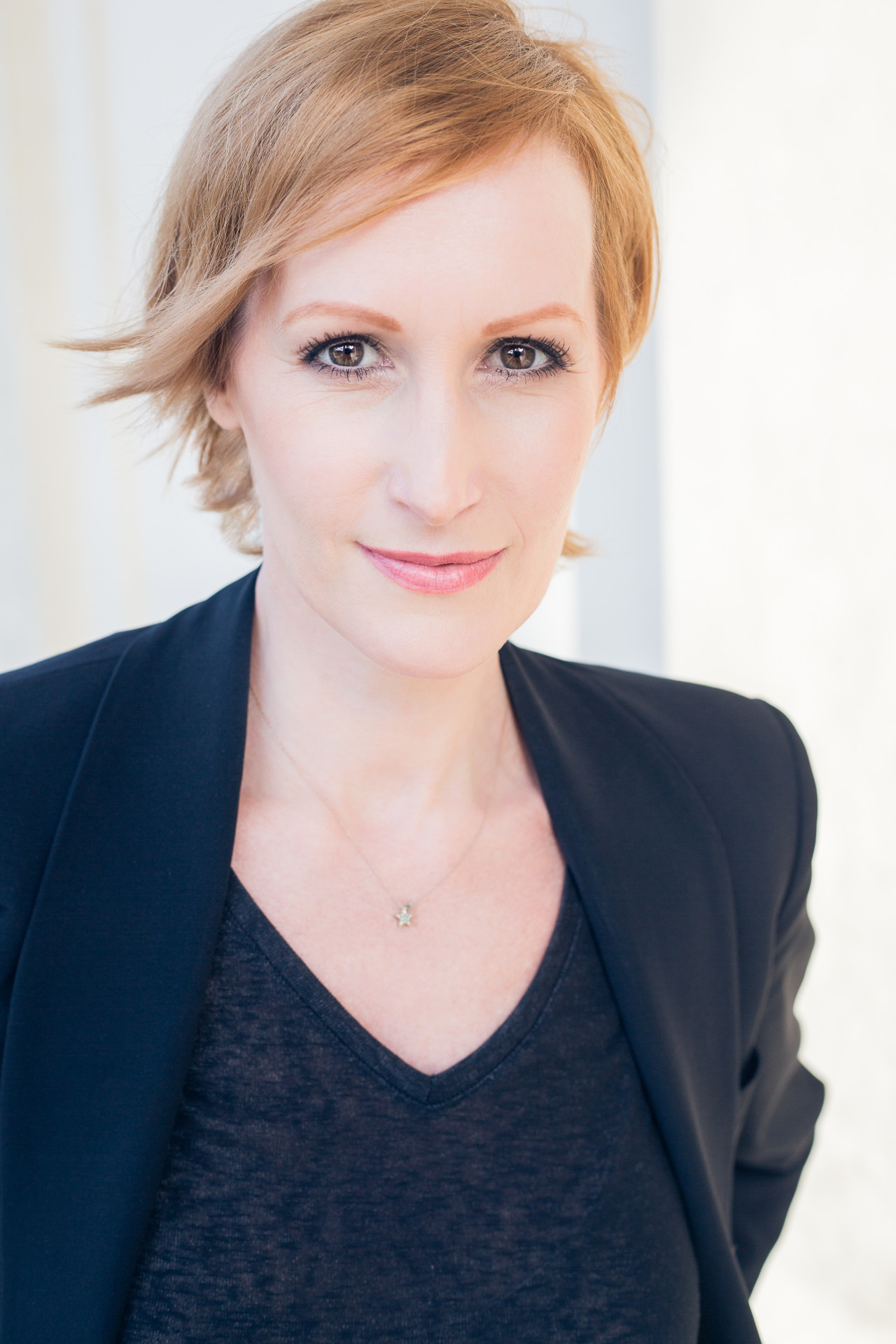
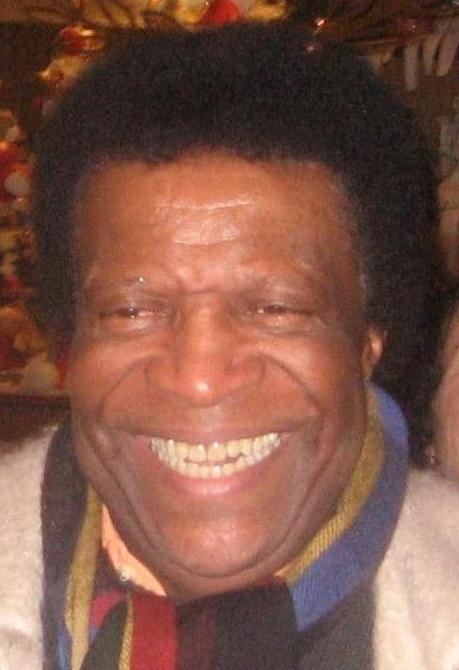
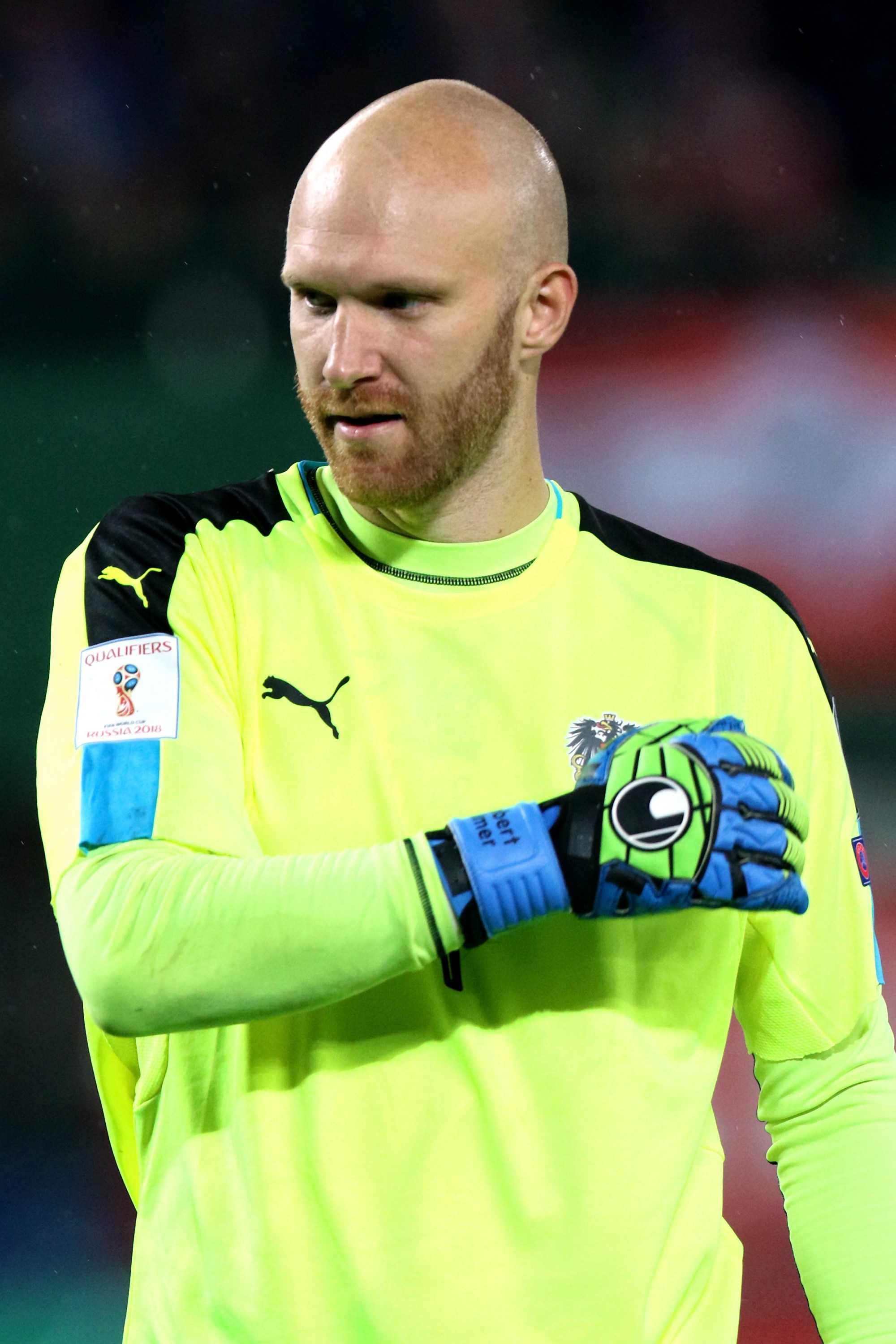
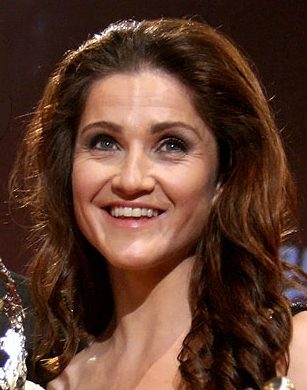
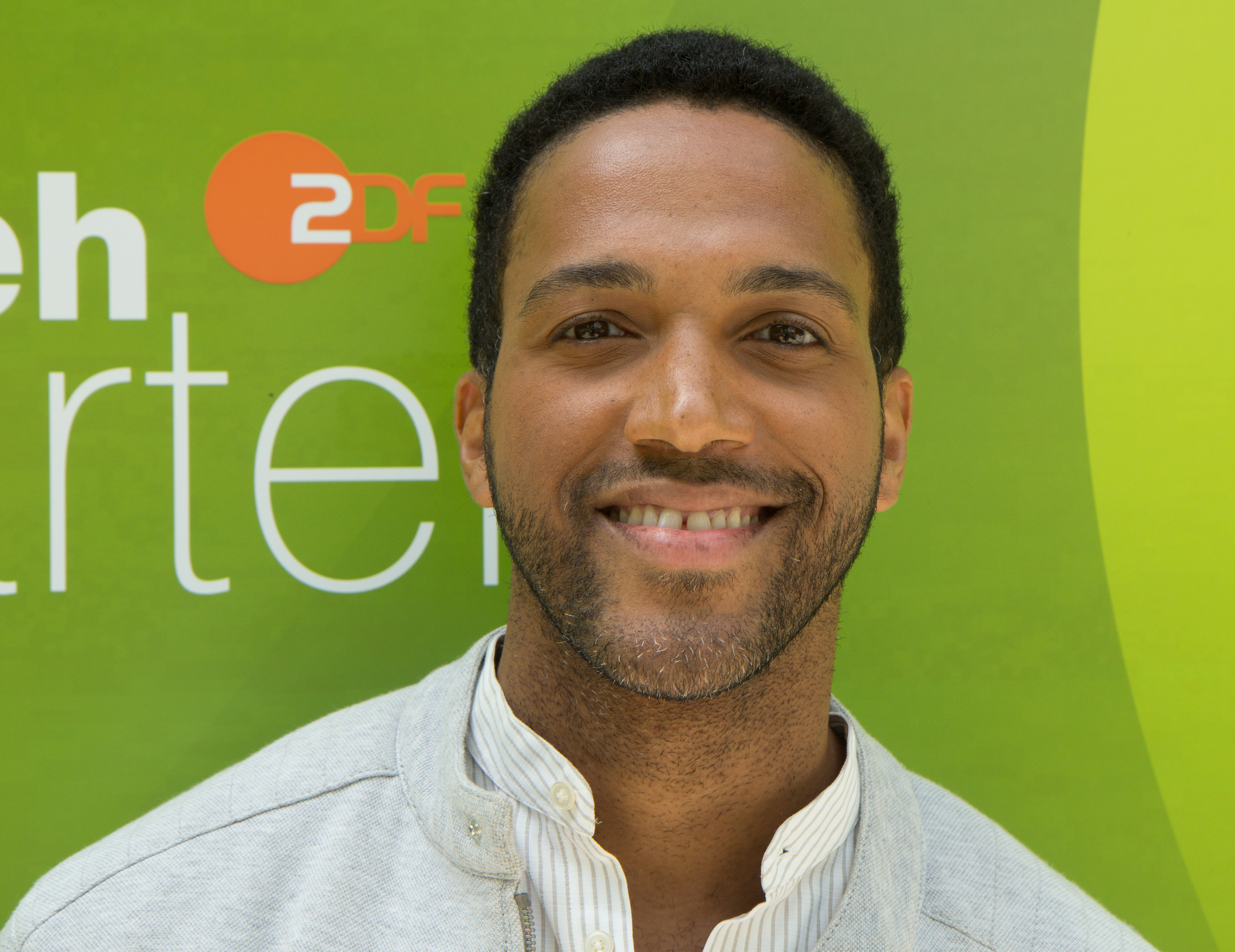
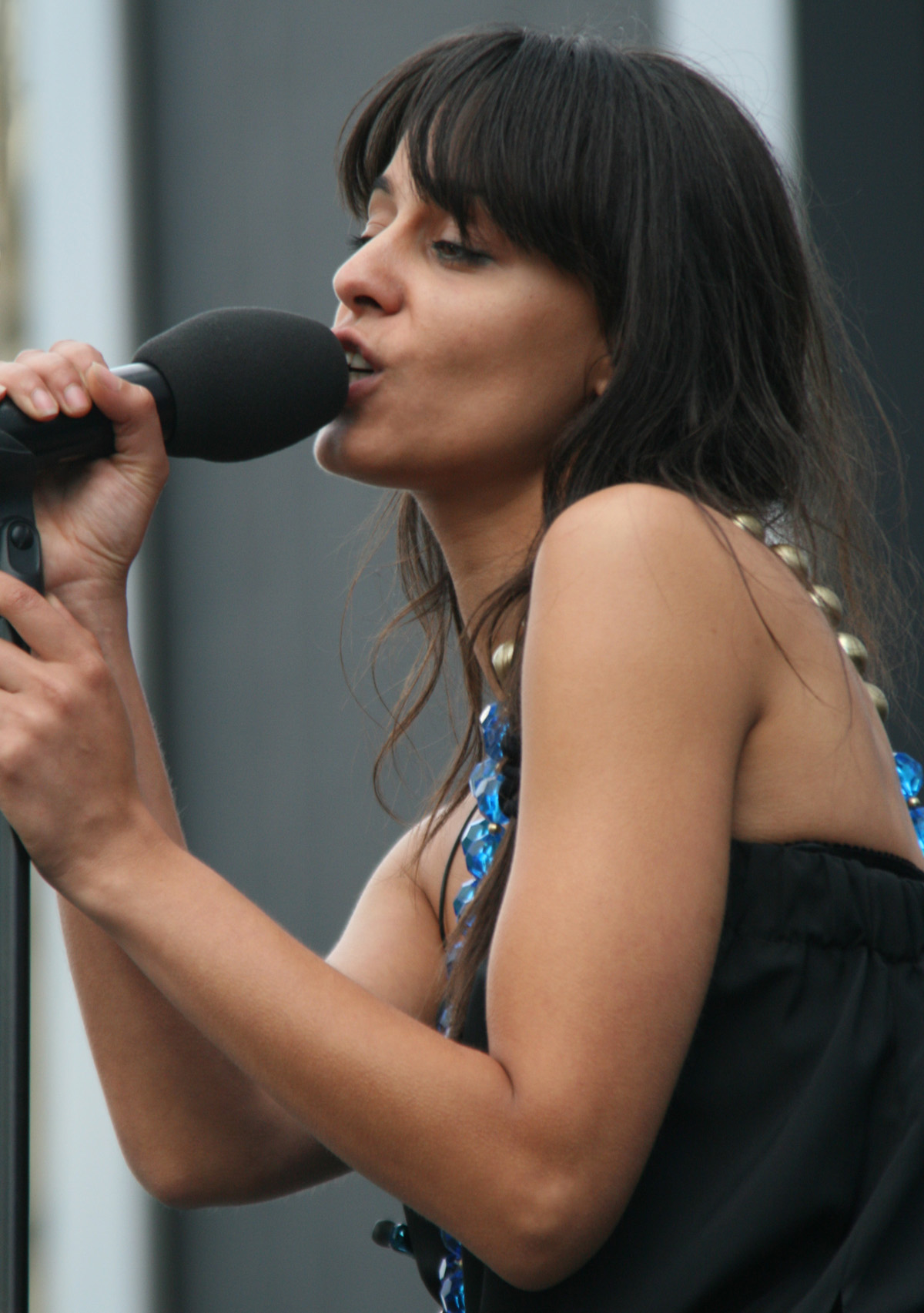
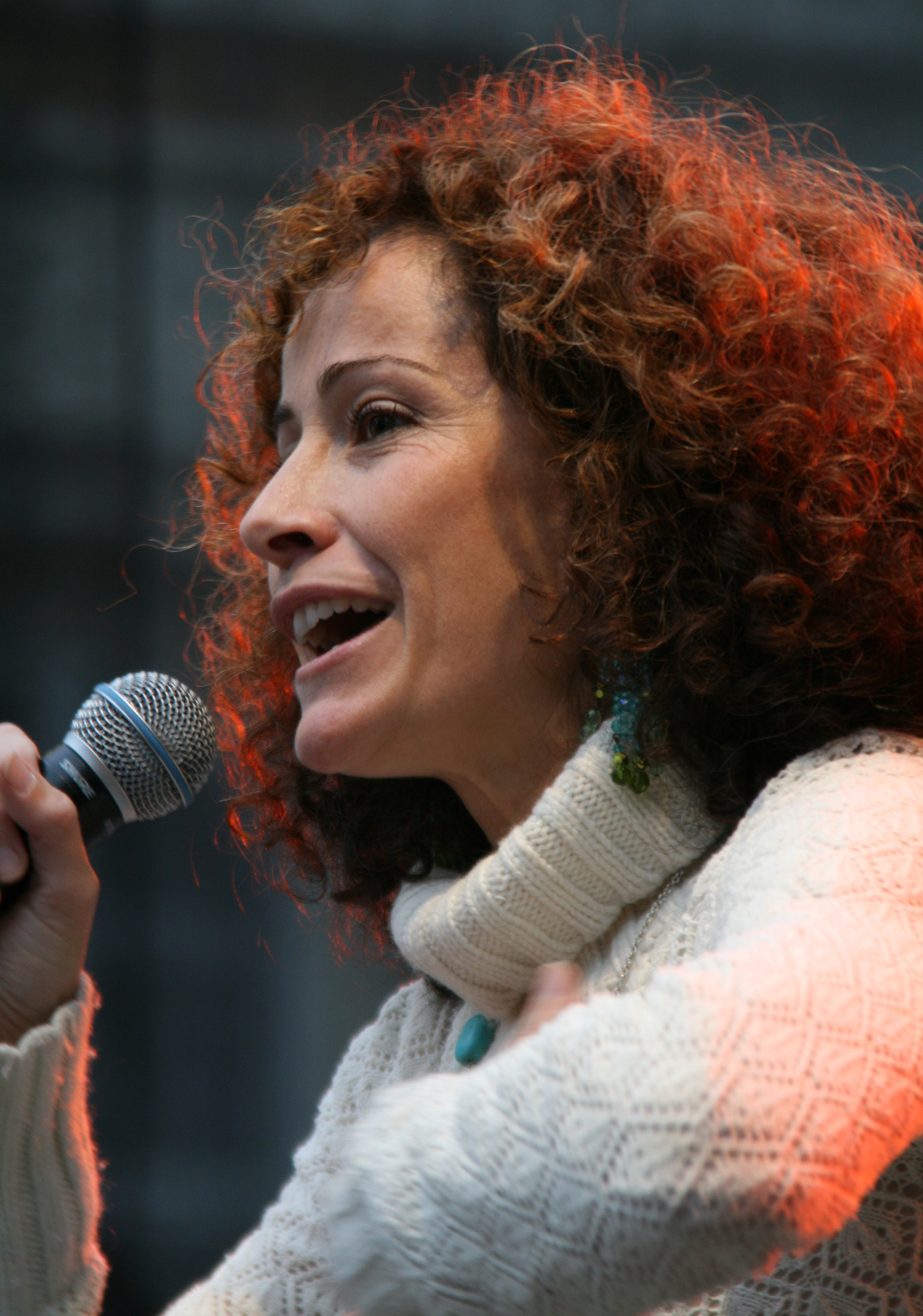
The celebrities who have competed in the second season of The Masked Singer Austria, pictured in order of elimination (l-r):

Klaus Eberhartinger ("Wildschwein"), Nicole Beutler ("Schaf"), Roberto Blanco ("Germknödel"), Robert Almer ("Wackeldackel"), Elisabeth Görgl ("Weintraube") Cesár Sampson ("Frechdachs") Madita ("Donaunymphe"), Sandra Pires ("Babyelefant").

Not Pictured: Jakob Seeböck ("Gelse")

Episodes

=== Week 1 (15 February) ===
Performances on the first episode
#	Stage name	Song	Identity	Result
1	Gelse	"Easy" by Lionel Richie/"Gangnam Style" by Psy	undisclosed	WIN
2	Babyelefant	"The Lion Sleeps Tonight" by The Tokens	undisclosed	RISK
3	Donaunymphe	"Toxic" by Britney Spears	undisclosed	WIN
4	Schaf	"These Boots Are Made for Walkin'" by Nancy Sinatra	undisclosed	RISK
5	Frechdachs	"Welcome to the Jungle" by Guns N' Roses	undisclosed	RISK
6	Wackeldackel	"Kabinenparty" by Skero	undisclosed	WIN
7	Wildschwein	"Behind Blue Eyes" by Limp Bizkit	Klaus Eberhartinger	OUT
8	Weintraube	"Je Veux" by Zaz	undisclosed	WIN
9	Germknödel	"Caruso" by Lucio Dalla	undisclosed	WIN

=== Week 2 (22 February) ===
Performances on the second episode
#	Stage name	Song	Identity	Result
1	Donaunymphe	"Don't Start Now" by Dua Lipa	undisclosed	WIN
2	Germknödel	"Cotton Eye Joe" by Rednex	undisclosed	RISK
3	Weintraube	"I Wanna Be Loved By You" by Marilyn Monroe/"Schöner fremder Mann" by Connie Francis	undisclosed	WIN
4	Wackeldackel	"Daddy Cool"/"Sunny" by Boney M.	undisclosed	RISK
5	Gelse	"Bungalow" by Bilderbuch	undisclosed	WIN
6	Schaf	"Time Warp" from The Rocky Horror Show	Nicole Beutler	OUT
7	Babyelefant	"Dancing Queen" by ABBA	undisclosed	RISK
8	Frechdachs	"Every You Every Me" by Placebo	undisclosed	WIN

=== Week 3 (1 March) ===
Performances on the third episode
#	Stage name	Song	Identity	Result
1	Frechdachs	"The Real Slim Shady" by Eminem	undisclosed	WIN
2	Gelse	"Last Resort" by Papa Roach	undisclosed	RISK
3	Wackeldackel	"Hollywood" by Gigi D'Agostino	undisclosed	WIN
4	Donaunymphe	"Mother" by Danzig	undisclosed	WIN
5	Weintraube	"Underdog" by Alicia Keys	undisclosed	RISK
6	Germknödel	"Fly Me to the Moon" by Frank Sinatra	Roberto Blanco	OUT
7	Babyelefant	"Engel" by Rammstein	undisclosed	WIN

=== Week 4 (8 March) ===
Performances on the fourth episode
#	Stage name	Song	Result	
1	Weintraube	"A Little Party Never Killed Nobody (All We Got)" by Fergie	RISK	
2	Babyelefant	"Somewhere Over the Rainbow/What a Wonderful World" by Israel Kamakawiwoʻole	WIN	
3	Wackeldackel	"Was du Liebe nennst" by Bausa	RISK	
4	Frechdachs	"Largo al factotum" by Gioachino Rossini	WIN	
5	Gelse	"...Baby One More Time" by Britney Spears	RISK	
6	Donaunymphe	"Time After Time" by Cyndi Lauper	WIN	
Sing-off details			Identity	Result
1	Weintraube	"Feeling Good" by Nina Simone/Muse	undisclosed	SAFE
2	Wackeldackel	"I'm Still Standing" by Elton John	Robert Almer	OUT
3	Gelse	"Ham kummst" by Seiler und Speer	undisclosed	SAFE

=== Week 5 (15 March) ===
Performances on the fifth episode
#	Stage name	Song	Identity	Result
Round One
1	Baby Elefant	"Bohemian Rhapsody" by Queen	undisclosed	SAFE
2	Gelse	"Sweet Dreams (Are Made of This)" by Marilyn Manson/Eurythmics	undisclosed	SAFE
3	Weintraube	"I Will Follow Him" by Peggy March	Elisabeth Görgl	OUT
4	Donaunymphe	"Frozen"/"Hung Up" by Madonna	undisclosed	SAFE
5	Frechdachs	"Wild World" by Cat Stevens	undisclosed	SAFE
Round Two
1	Babyelefant	"One Moment in Time" by Whitney Houston	undisclosed	WIN
2	Gelse	"Word Up!" by Cameo	undisclosed	RISK
3	Donaunymphe	"Ohne dich" by Rammstein	undisclosed	WIN
4	Frechdachs	"Jailhouse Rock" by Elvis Presley	Cesár Sampson	OUT

=== Week 6 (22 March) ===
- Group number: "Come Together" by The Beatles/"Don't Stop Me Now" by Queen

Performances on the sixth episode
#	Stage name	Song	Identity	Result
Round One
1	Donaunymphe	"Freed from Desire" by Gala	undisclosed	SAFE
2	Gelse	"Under the Bridge" by Red Hot Chili Peppers	Jakob Seeböck	THIRD
3	Babyelefant	"Never Enough" by Loren Allred	undisclosed	SAFE
Round Two
1	Donaunymphe	"Toxic" by Britney Spears	Madita	RUNNER-UP
2	Babyelefant	"Bohemian Rhapsody" by Queen	Sandra Pires	WINNER

== Reception ==
=== Ratings ===
Season	Time slot	No. of episodes	Premiered		Ended		TV season	Viewers (in millions)
Season	Time slot	No. of episodes	Date	Viewers (in millions)	Date	Viewers (in millions)	TV season	Viewers (in millions)
1	Saturday 8:15 pm (episode 1); Tuesdays 8:15 pm (episodes 2-6)	6	14 March 2020	0.311	1 August 2019	0.292	2019–2020	
2	Mondays 8:15 pm	6	15 February 2021	0.121	22 March 2021	TBA	2020–2021	
