= The Masked Singer Austria season 2 =

The Masked Singer Austria
- Season 2
- Starring: Elke Winkens; Sasa Schwarzjirg; Rainer Schönfelder; Various guests
- Hosted by: Mirjam Weichselbraun
- No. of contestants: 9
- Winners: Sandra Pires as "Babyelefant"
- Runners-up: Madita as "Donaunymphe"
- No. of episodes: 6

Release
- Original network: Puls 4
- Original release: 15 February 2021 – March 22, 2021

Season chronology
- ← Previous; Season 1

The first season of the Austrian singing competition The Masked Singer Austria premiered on 15 February 2021 on Puls 4. Elke Winkens and Sasa Schwarzjirg, returned as the panelists. Rainer Schönfelder was the new panelist, replacing Nathan Trent. Mirjam Weichselbraun was the new host, replacing Arabella Kiesbauer.

On 22 March 2021, the Babyelefant (singer Sandra Pires) was declared the winner and the Donaunymphe (singer Madita) was the runner-up.

== Panelists and host ==
Season 2 panelists and host

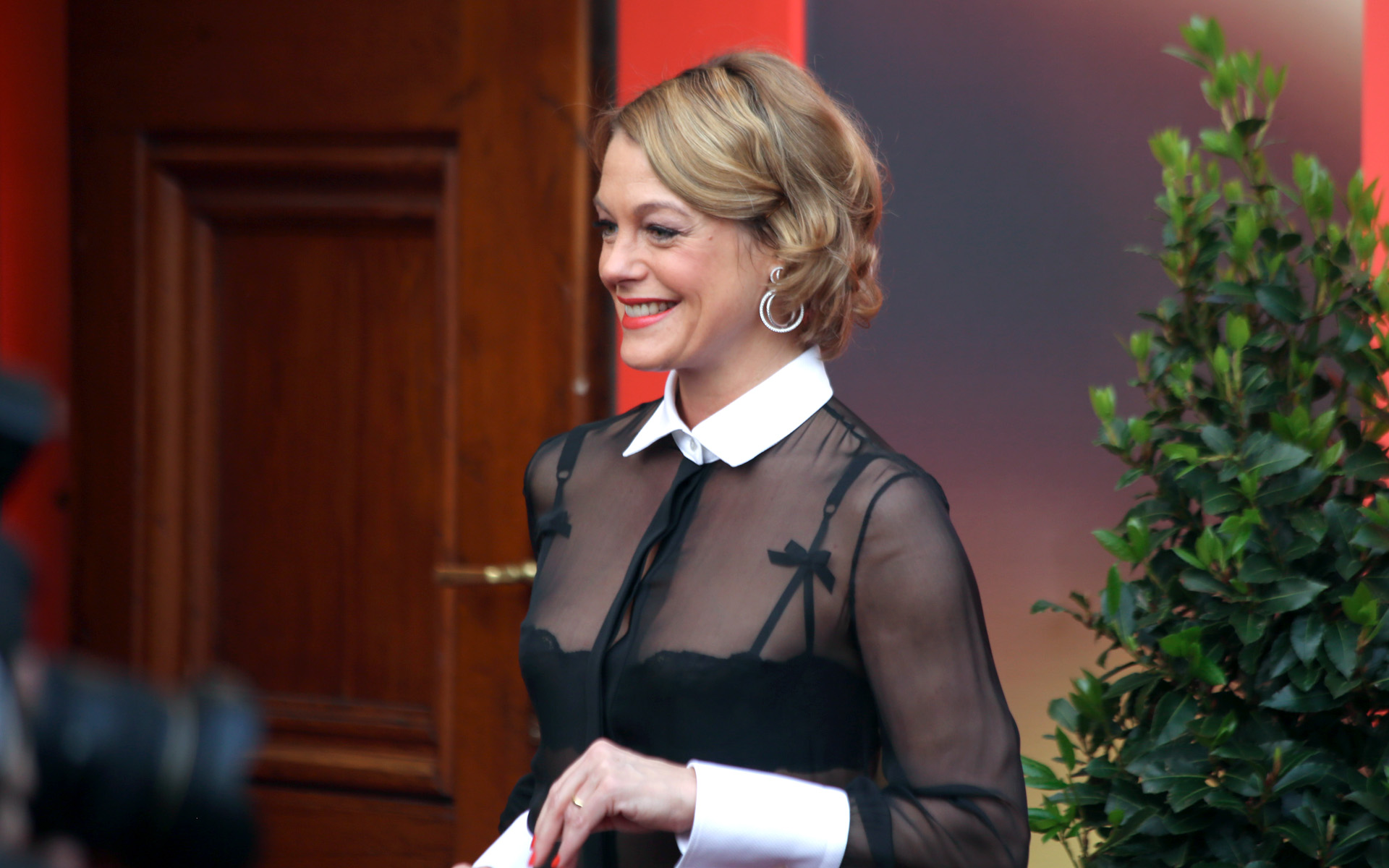
Elke Winkens

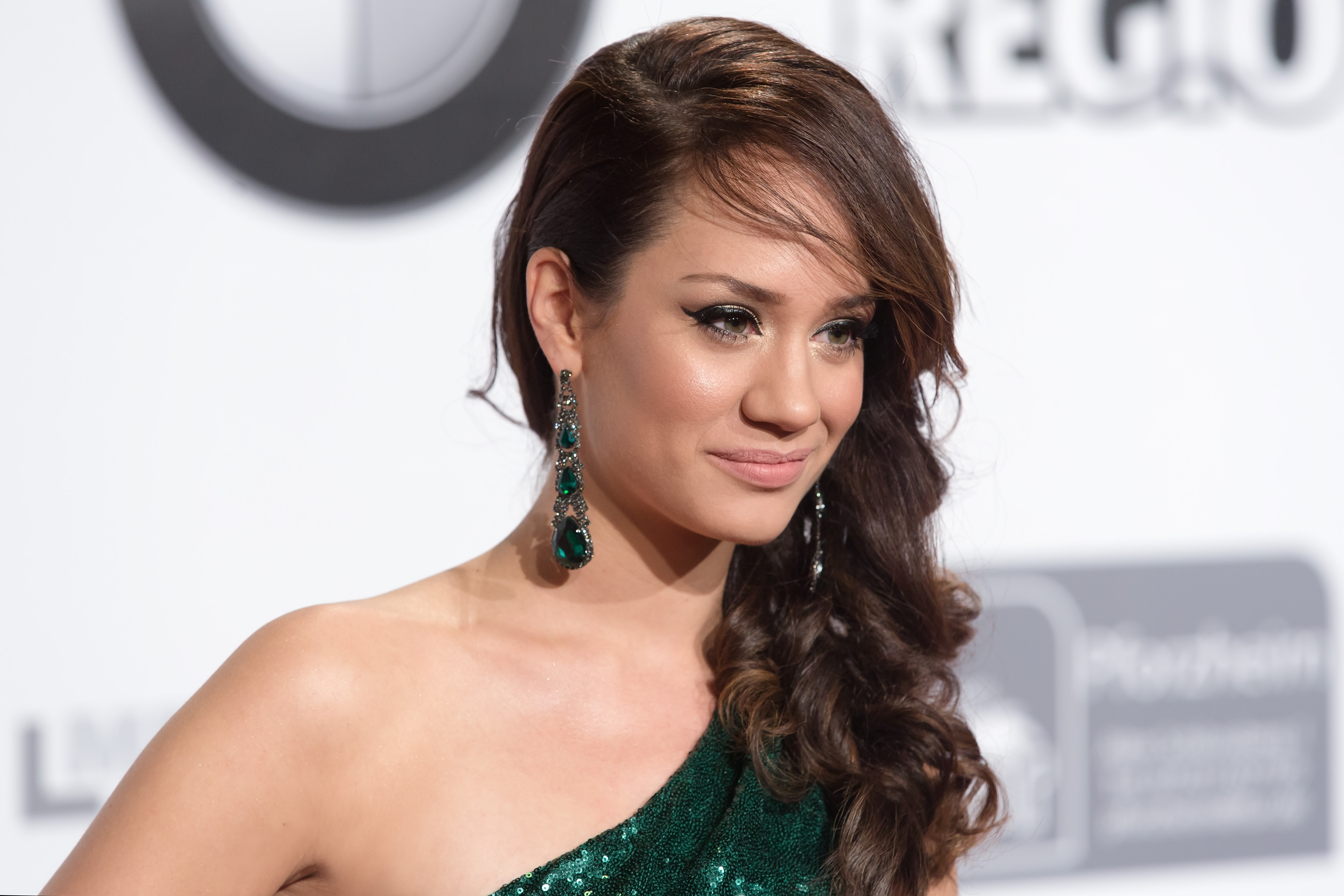
Sasa Schwarzjirg

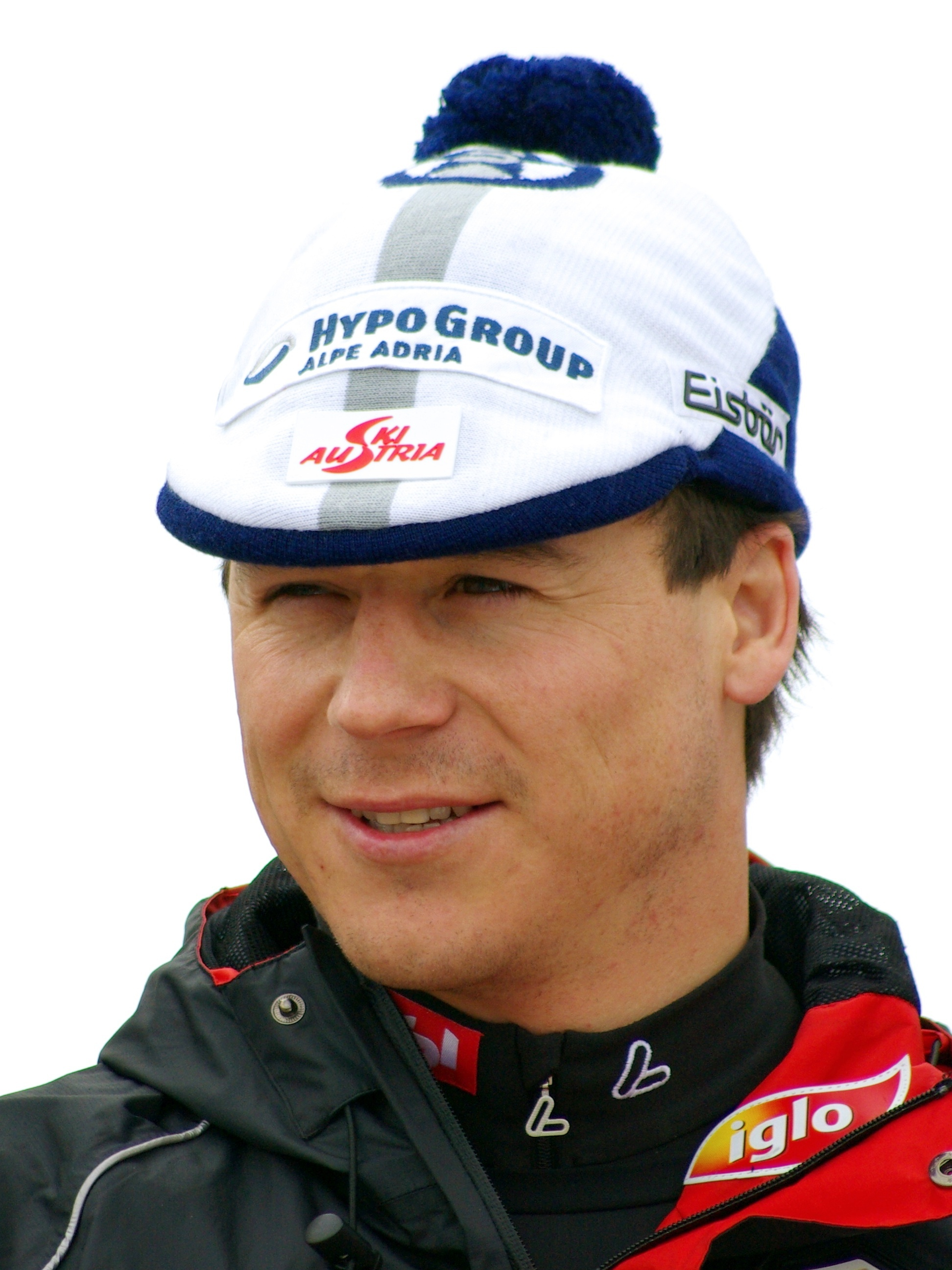
Rainer Schönfelder

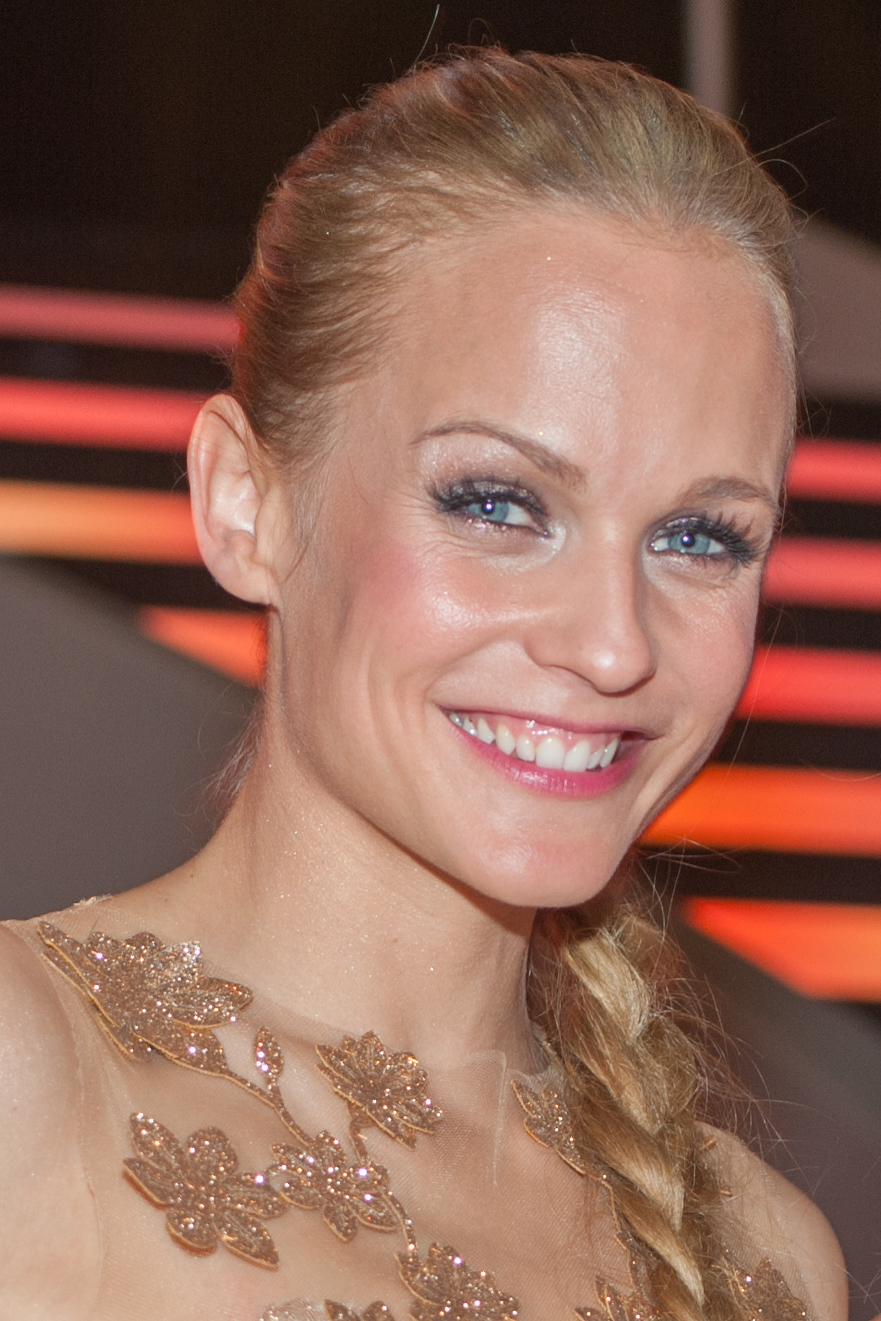
Mirjam Weichselbraun

=== Guest panelists ===
Throughout the second season, various guest judges are set to appear alongside Elke Winkens, Rainer Schönfelder, and Sasa Schwarzjirg as the fourth member of the judging panel, for one episode.

The guest panelists that have been included so far:

Episode	Name	Notability
1	Felix Neureuther	Retired Ski Racer
2	Nina Proll	Actress
3	Andy Borg	Singer
4	Josh.	Singer
5	Ina Regen	Singer
6	Nadine Beiler	Singer

== Contestants ==
Stage name	Celebrity	Notability	Episodes							
Stage name	Celebrity	Notability	1	2	3	4	5		6	
Stage name	Celebrity	Notability	1	2	3	4	A	B	A	B
Babyelefant "Baby Elephant"	Sandra Pires	Singer	RISK	RISK	WIN	WIN	SAFE	WIN	SAFE	WINNER
Donaunymphe "Danube Siren"	Madita	Singer/actress	WIN	WIN	WIN	WIN	SAFE	WIN	SAFE	RUNNER-UP
Gelse "Mosquito"	Jakob Seeböck	Actor	WIN	WIN	RISK	RISK	SAFE	RISK	THIRD	
Frechdachs "Cheeky Badger"	Cesár Sampson	Singer	RISK	WIN	WIN	WIN	SAFE	OUT		
Weintraube "Grape"	Elisabeth Görgl	Retired Ski Racer	WIN	WIN	RISK	RISK	OUT			
Wackeldackel "Bobblehead"	Robert Almer	Former Footballer	WIN	RISK	WIN	OUT				
Germknödel "Yeast Dumpling"	Roberto Blanco	Singer & Actor	WIN	RISK	OUT					
Schaf "Sheep"	Nicole Beutler	Actress	RISK	OUT						
Wildschwein "Wild Boar"	Klaus Eberhartinger	Singer/actor/host	OUT							

The masked singer won their face-off and remained in the competition.
The masked singer lost their face-off and was in the bottom three/two, but was not eliminated.
The masked singer was safe from elimination.
The masked singer was eliminated from the competition and unmasked upon their elimination.
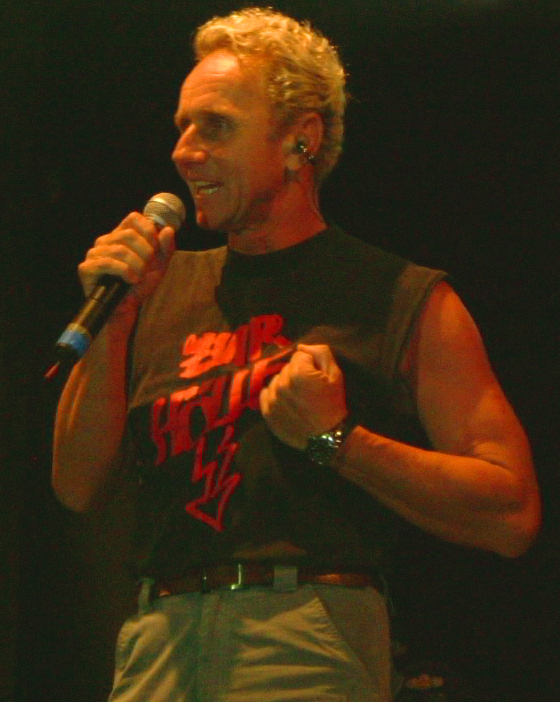
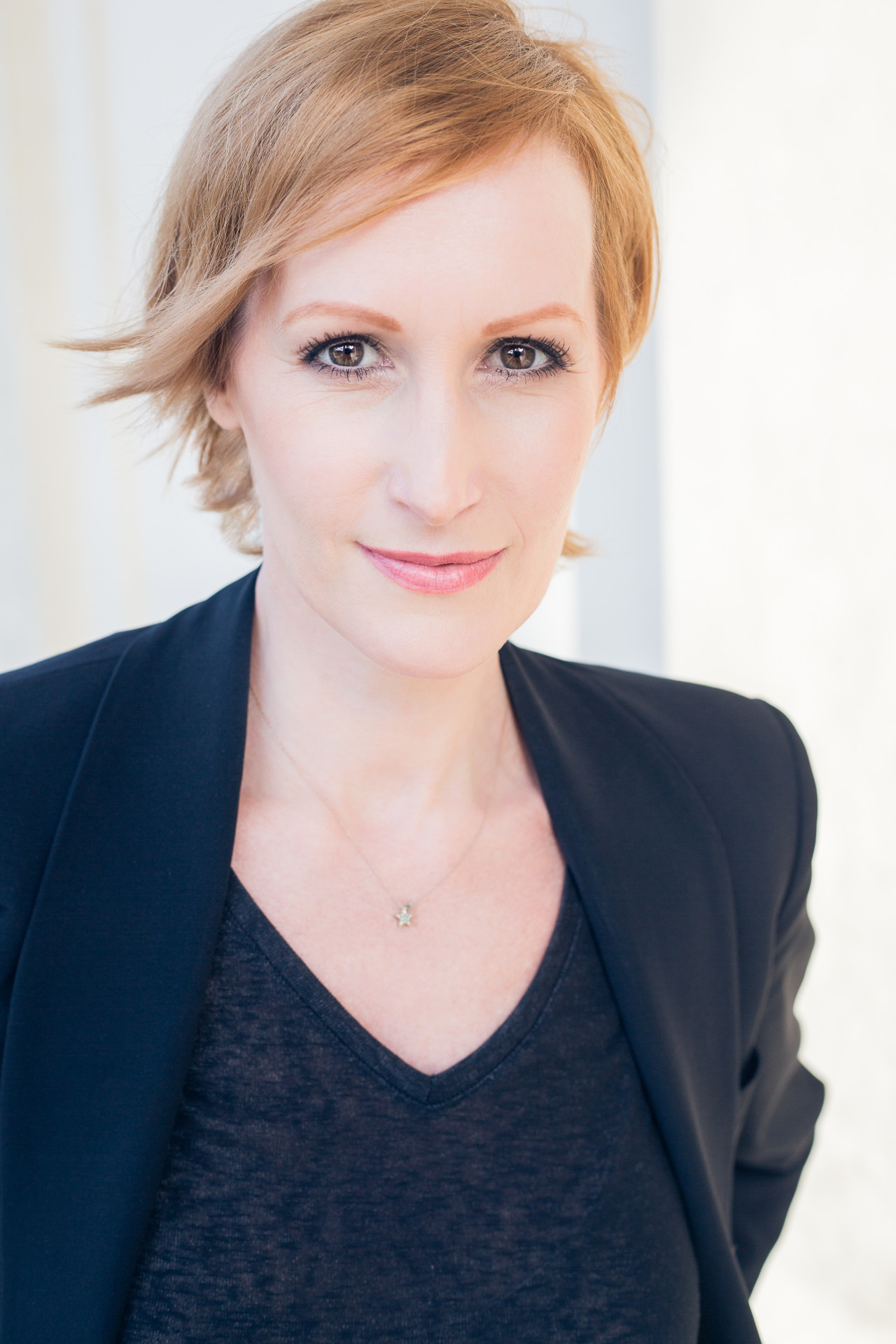
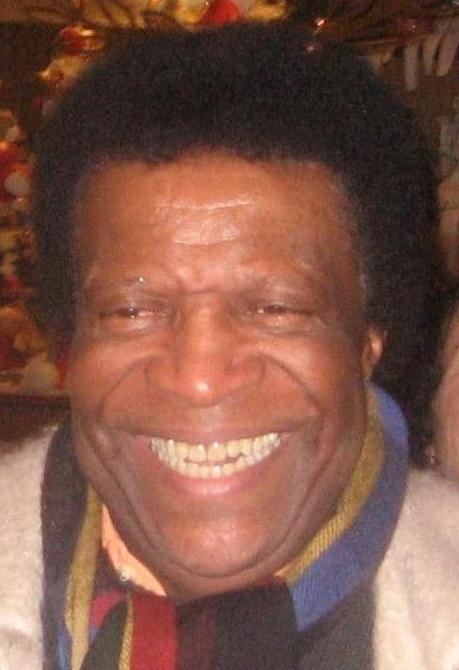
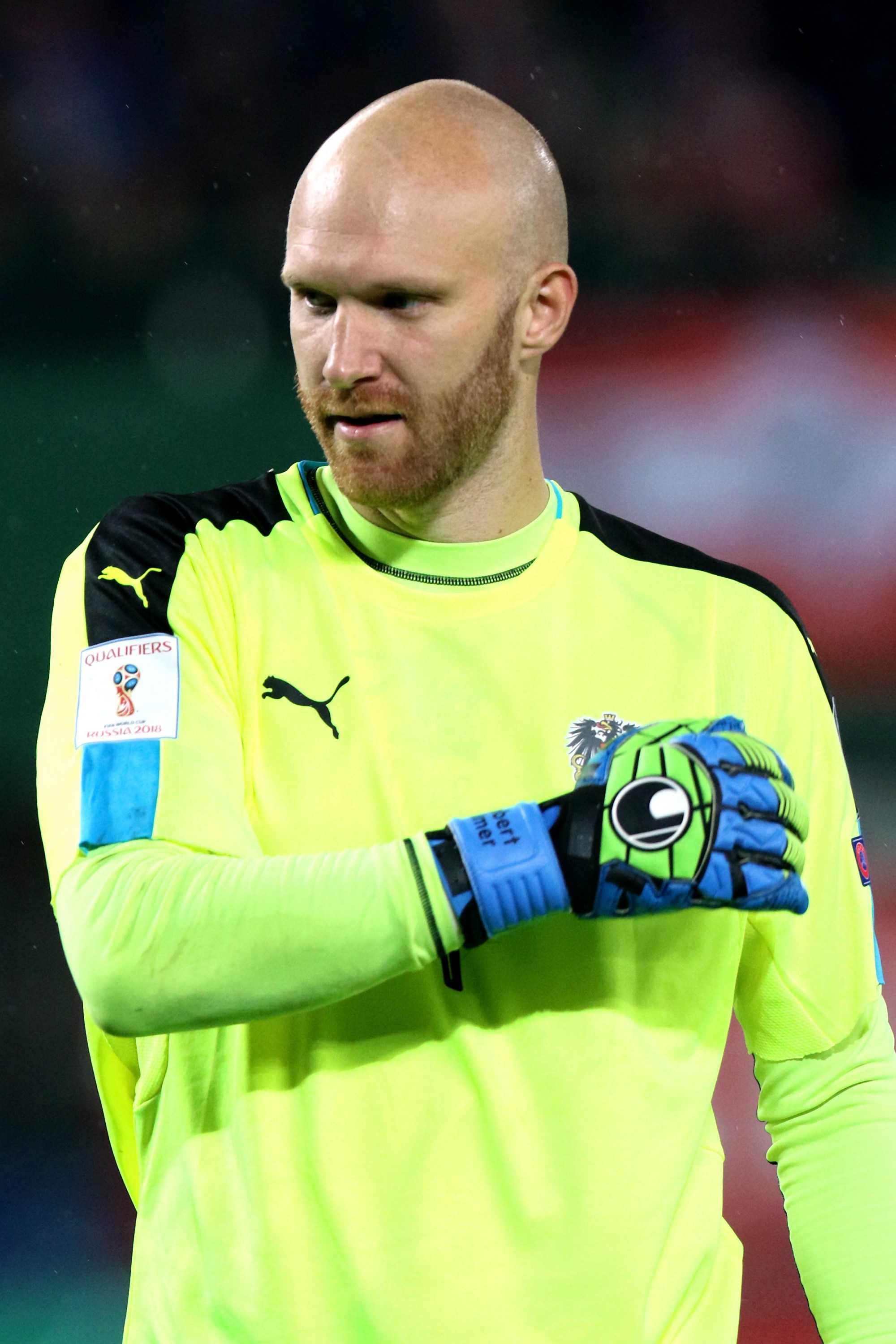
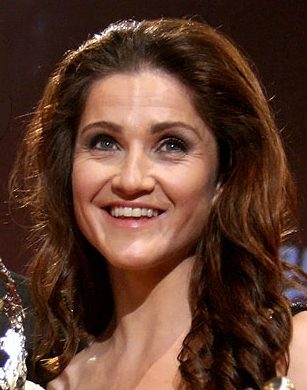
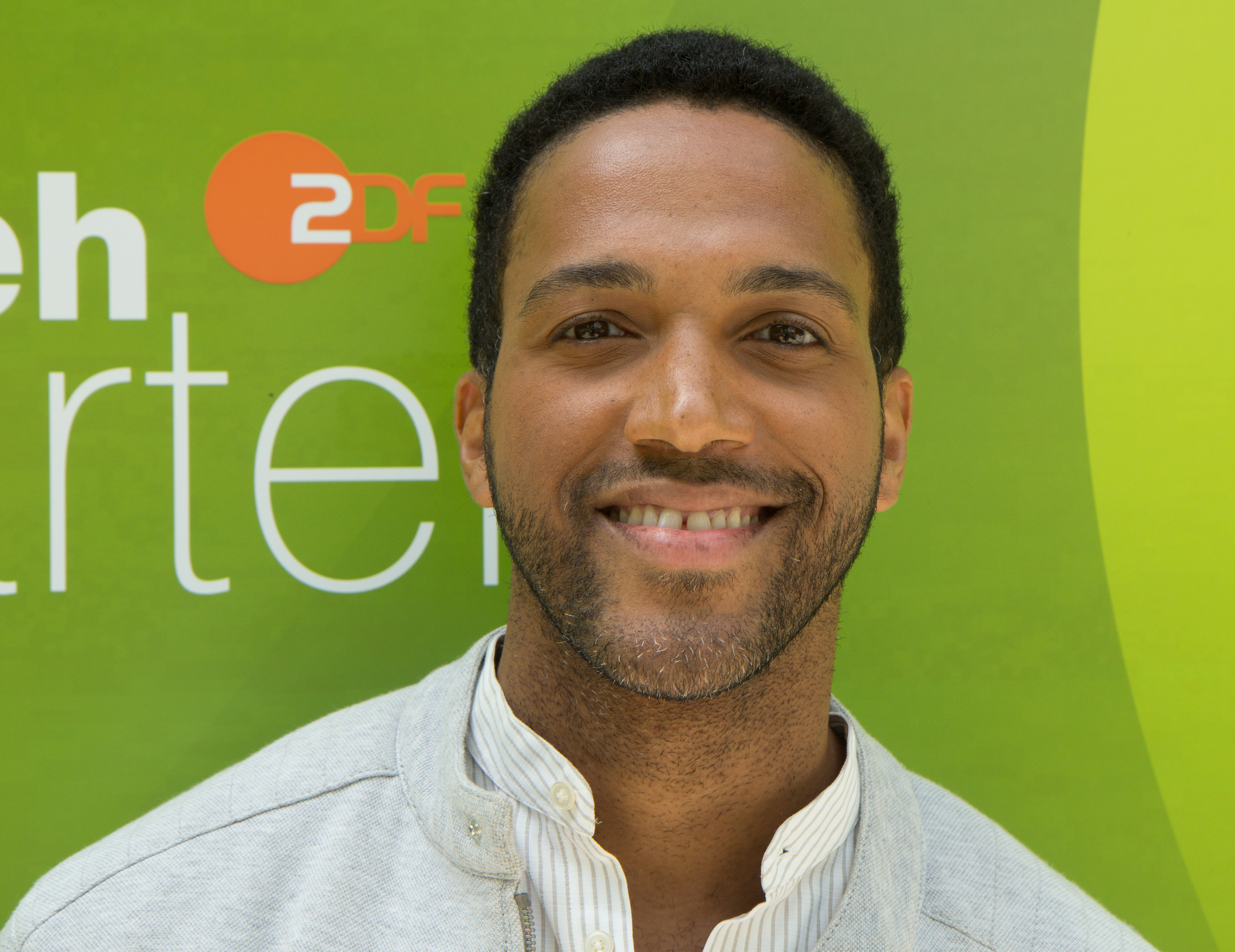
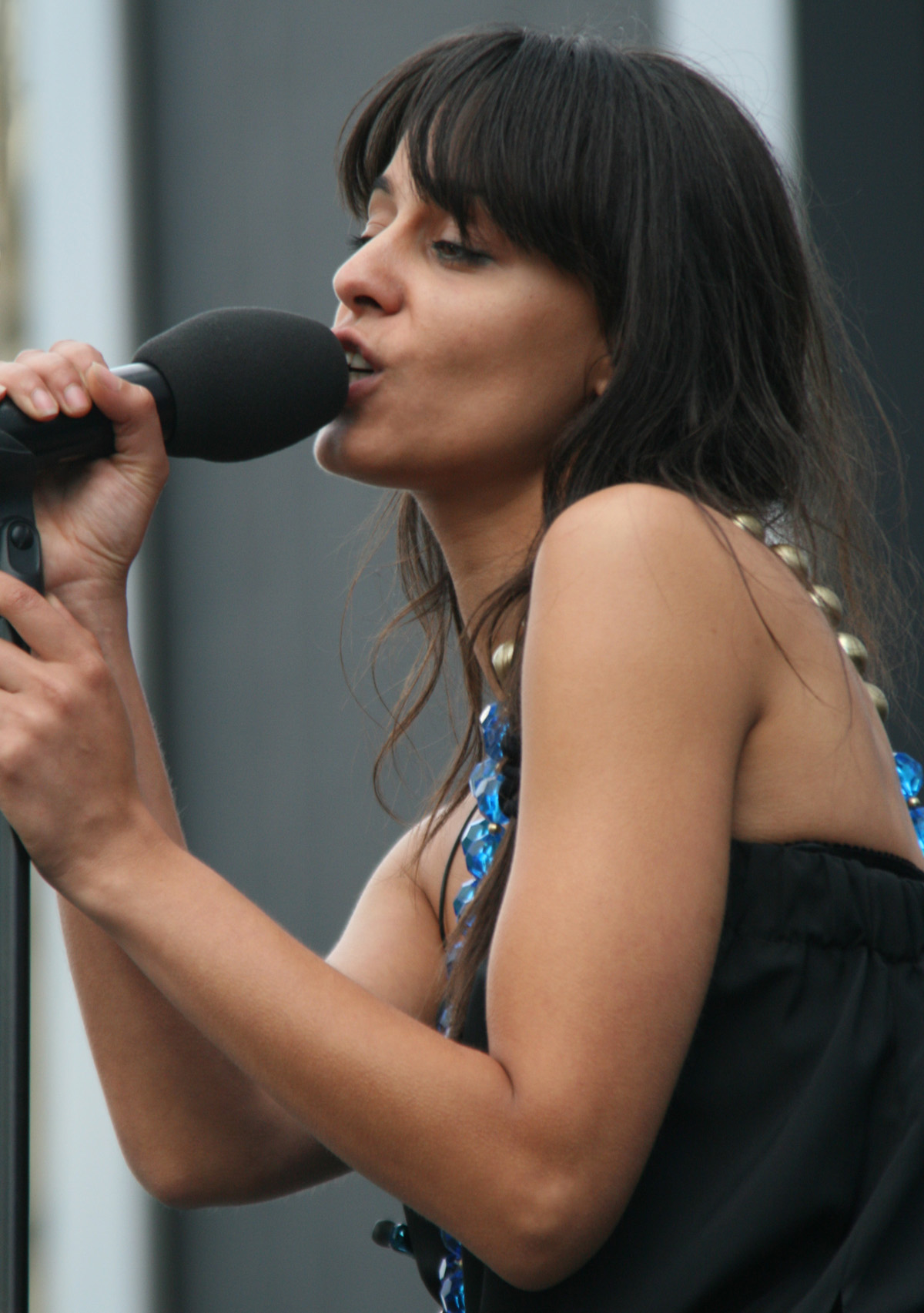
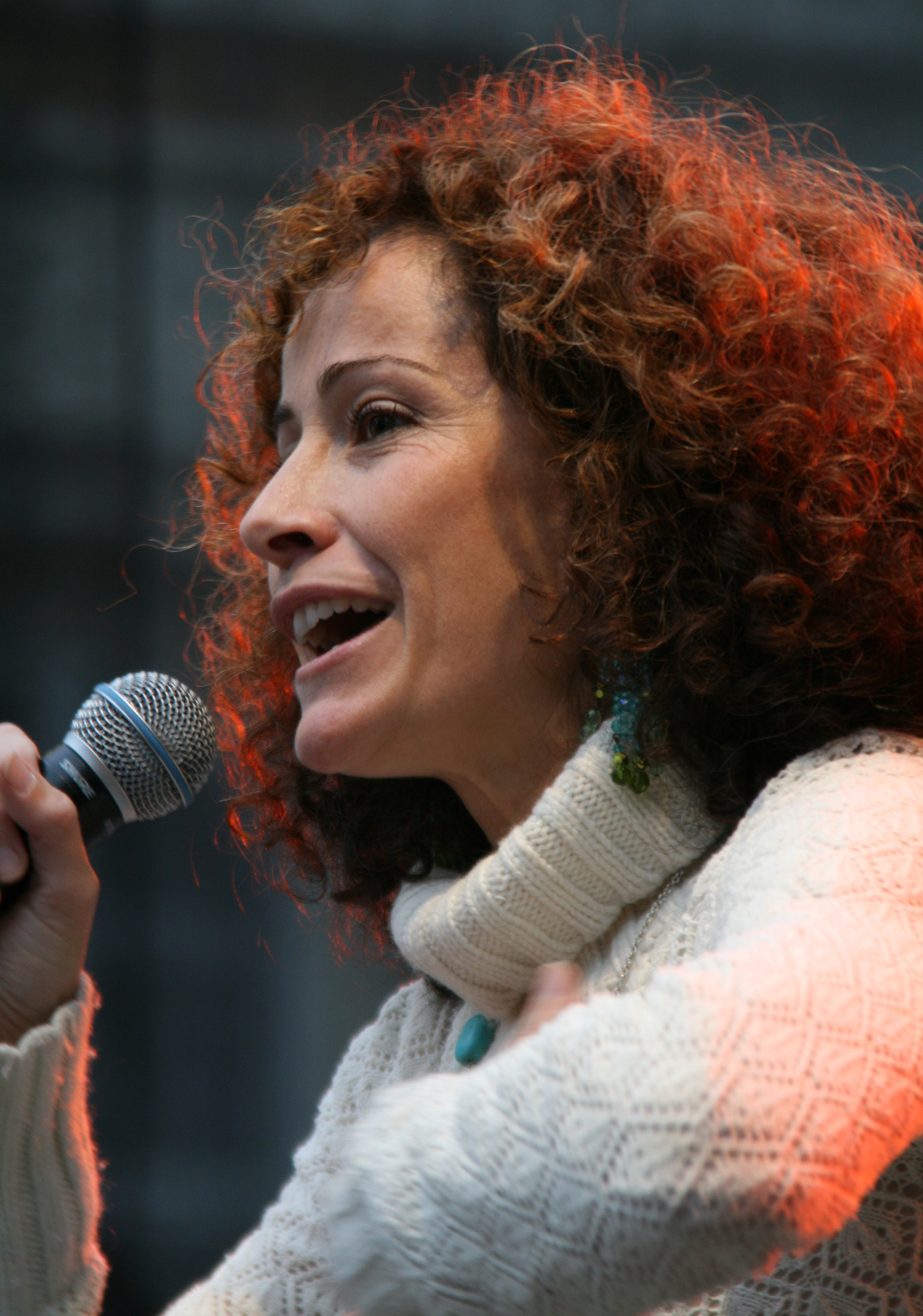
The celebrities who have competed in the second season of The Masked Singer Austria, pictured in order of elimination (l-r):

Klaus Eberhartinger ("Wildschwein"), Nicole Beutler ("Schaf"), Roberto Blanco ("Germknödel"), Robert Almer ("Wackeldackel"), Elisabeth Görgl ("Weintraube") Cesár Sampson ("Frechdachs") Madita ("Donaunymphe"), Sandra Pires ("Babyelefant").

Not Pictured: Jakob Seeböck ("Gelse")

== Episodes ==
=== Week 1 (15 February) ===
Performances on the first episode
#	Stage name	Song	Identity	Result
1	Gelse	"Easy" by Lionel Richie/"Gangnam Style" by Psy	undisclosed	WIN
2	Babyelefant	"The Lion Sleeps Tonight" by The Tokens	undisclosed	RISK
3	Donaunymphe	"Toxic" by Britney Spears	undisclosed	WIN
4	Schaf	"These Boots Are Made for Walkin'" by Nancy Sinatra	undisclosed	RISK
5	Frechdachs	"Welcome to the Jungle" by Guns N' Roses	undisclosed	RISK
6	Wackeldackel	"Kabinenparty" by Skero	undisclosed	WIN
7	Wildschwein	"Behind Blue Eyes" by Limp Bizkit	Klaus Eberhartinger	OUT
8	Weintraube	"Je Veux" by Zaz	undisclosed	WIN
9	Germknödel	"Caruso" by Lucio Dalla	undisclosed	WIN

=== Week 2 (22 February) ===
Performances on the second episode
#	Stage name	Song	Identity	Result
1	Donaunymphe	"Don't Start Now" by Dua Lipa	undisclosed	WIN
2	Germknödel	"Cotton Eye Joe" by Rednex	undisclosed	RISK
3	Weintraube	"I Wanna Be Loved By You" by Marilyn Monroe/"Schöner fremder Mann" by Connie Francis	undisclosed	WIN
4	Wackeldackel	"Daddy Cool"/"Sunny" by Boney M.	undisclosed	RISK
5	Gelse	"Bungalow" by Bilderbuch	undisclosed	WIN
6	Schaf	"Time Warp" from The Rocky Horror Show	Nicole Beutler	OUT
7	Babyelefant	"Dancing Queen" by ABBA	undisclosed	RISK
8	Frechdachs	"Every You Every Me" by Placebo	undisclosed	WIN

=== Week 3 (1 March) ===
Performances on the third episode
#	Stage name	Song	Identity	Result
1	Frechdachs	"The Real Slim Shady" by Eminem	undisclosed	WIN
2	Gelse	"Last Resort" by Papa Roach	undisclosed	RISK
3	Wackeldackel	"Hollywood" by Gigi D'Agostino	undisclosed	WIN
4	Donaunymphe	"Mother" by Danzig	undisclosed	WIN
5	Weintraube	"Underdog" by Alicia Keys	undisclosed	RISK
6	Germknödel	"Fly Me to the Moon" by Frank Sinatra	Roberto Blanco	OUT
7	Babyelefant	"Engel" by Rammstein	undisclosed	WIN

=== Week 4 (8 March) ===
Performances on the fourth episode
#	Stage name	Song	Result	
1	Weintraube	"A Little Party Never Killed Nobody (All We Got)" by Fergie	RISK	
2	Babyelefant	"Somewhere Over the Rainbow/What a Wonderful World" by Israel Kamakawiwoʻole	WIN	
3	Wackeldackel	"Was du Liebe nennst" by Bausa	RISK	
4	Frechdachs	"Largo al factotum" by Gioachino Rossini	WIN	
5	Gelse	"...Baby One More Time" by Britney Spears	RISK	
6	Donaunymphe	"Time After Time" by Cyndi Lauper	WIN	
Sing-off details			Identity	Result
1	Weintraube	"Feeling Good" by Nina Simone/Muse	undisclosed	SAFE
2	Wackeldackel	"I'm Still Standing" by Elton John	Robert Almer	OUT
3	Gelse	"Ham kummst" by Seiler und Speer	undisclosed	SAFE

=== Week 5 (15 March) ===
Performances on the fifth episode
#	Stage name	Song	Identity	Result
Round One
1	Baby Elefant	"Bohemian Rhapsody" by Queen	undisclosed	SAFE
2	Gelse	"Sweet Dreams (Are Made of This)" by Marilyn Manson/Eurythmics	undisclosed	SAFE
3	Weintraube	"I Will Follow Him" by Peggy March	Elisabeth Görgl	OUT
4	Donaunymphe	"Frozen"/"Hung Up" by Madonna	undisclosed	SAFE
5	Frechdachs	"Wild World" by Cat Stevens	undisclosed	SAFE
Round Two
1	Babyelefant	"One Moment in Time" by Whitney Houston	undisclosed	WIN
2	Gelse	"Word Up!" by Cameo	undisclosed	RISK
3	Donaunymphe	"Ohne dich" by Rammstein	undisclosed	WIN
4	Frechdachs	"Jailhouse Rock" by Elvis Presley	Cesár Sampson	OUT

=== Week 6 (22 March) ===
- Group number: "Come Together" by The Beatles/"Don't Stop Me Now" by Queen

Performances on the sixth episode
#	Stage name	Song	Identity	Result
Round One
1	Donaunymphe	"Freed from Desire" by Gala	undisclosed	SAFE
2	Gelse	"Under the Bridge" by Red Hot Chili Peppers	Jakob Seeböck	THIRD
3	Babyelefant	"Never Enough" by Loren Allred	undisclosed	SAFE
Round Two
1	Donaunymphe	"Toxic" by Britney Spears	Madita	RUNNER-UP
2	Babyelefant	"Bohemian Rhapsody" by Queen	Sandra Pires	WINNER

== Reception ==
=== Ratings ===
Episode	Original airdate	Time slot	Viewers (in millions)		Share		Source
Episode	Original airdate	Time slot	Household	Adults 12-49	Household	Adults 12-49	Source
1	15 February 2021	Mondays 8:15 pm		0.121		11.6%	
2	22 February 2021	Mondays 8:15 pm		0.128		13.0%	
3	1 March 2021	Mondays 8:15 pm					
4	8 March 2021	Mondays 8:15 pm					
