= Sandra Pires (singer) =

Portuguese film actor and singer

- Sandra Carla de Lopes Morato e Leal Pires
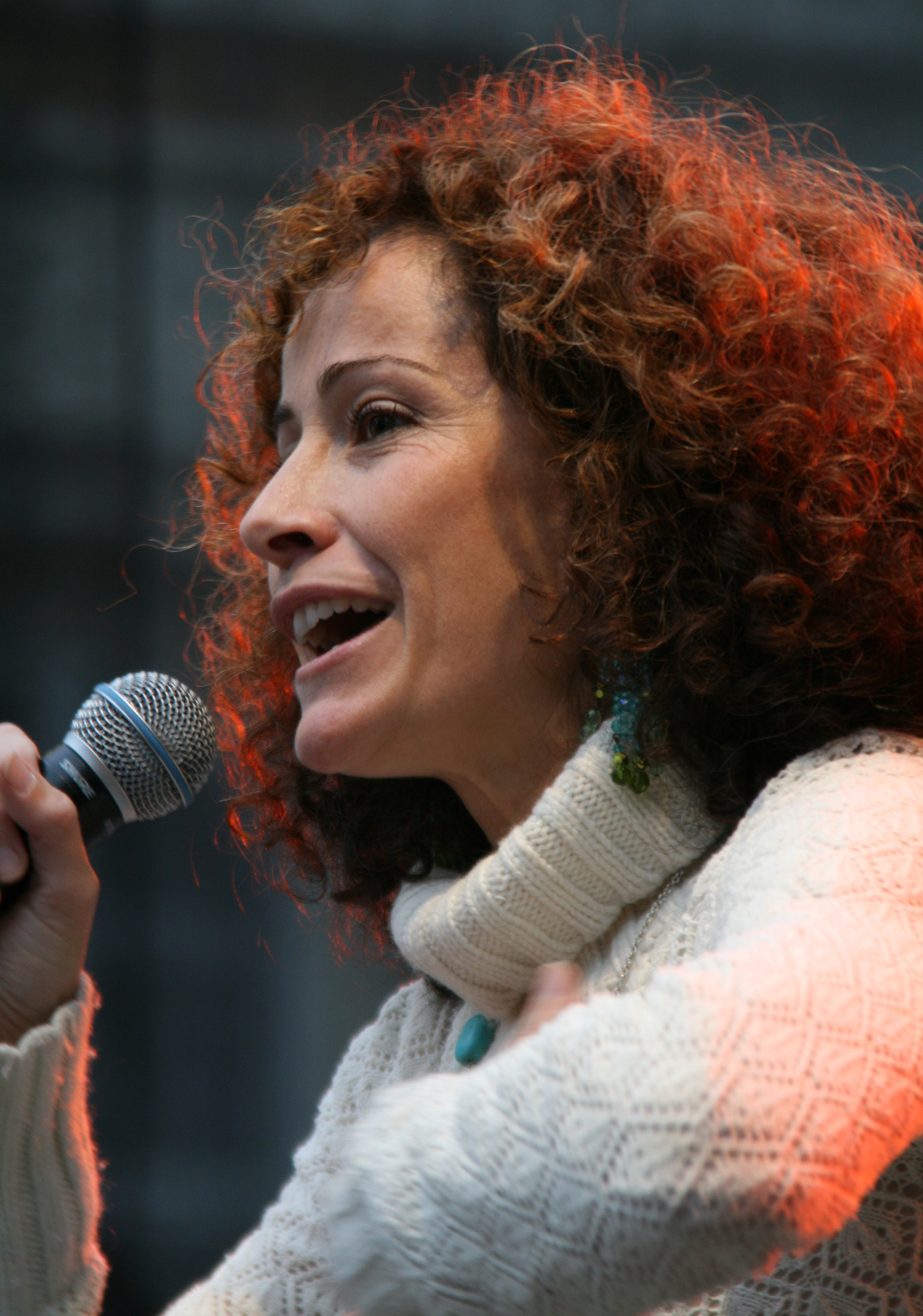
- Born: 26 August 1969; Dili
- Occupation: Singer

Sandra Carla de Lopes Morato e Leal Pires (born 26 August 1969) is a Portuguese singer and actor.

Sandra Pires was born on 26 August 1969 in Dili in Portuguese Timor. She was initially raised by her grandparents in Portugal, then moved with her parents to Australia as a teenager. At age 15, she won the Australian television talent show Pot of Gold and went on to sing with a number of Australian bands, including Fifi Blue and The Flames and Spank You Very Much.

She signed with BMG and moved to Vienna in 1992. In 1997, she released an English-language cover, "Here I AM", of Eros Ramazotti's hit "Adesso Tu".

In 2005, she played Maria in The Sound of Music at the Vienna Volksoper, the first time the musical had ever been performed in Austria, the setting of the story. In 2010, she played Nellie Forbush in South Pacific, also at the Volksoper.

In 2021, she won season two of The Masked Singer Austria disguised as a baby elephant.

== Discography ==
=== Singles ===
- Here I am 1997
- How long will it take 1999
- It’s Christmas 2001 (with Erwin Kiennast)
- I Feel so Alive 2008

=== Albums ===
- Sandra Pires and Erwin Kiennast: That’s Live 1996
- Sandra Pires 1998
- Meine Schwester das Biest (Soundtrack) 2002
- Songs for Lea 2002
- Destino 2006
