= Elke Winkens =

German actress

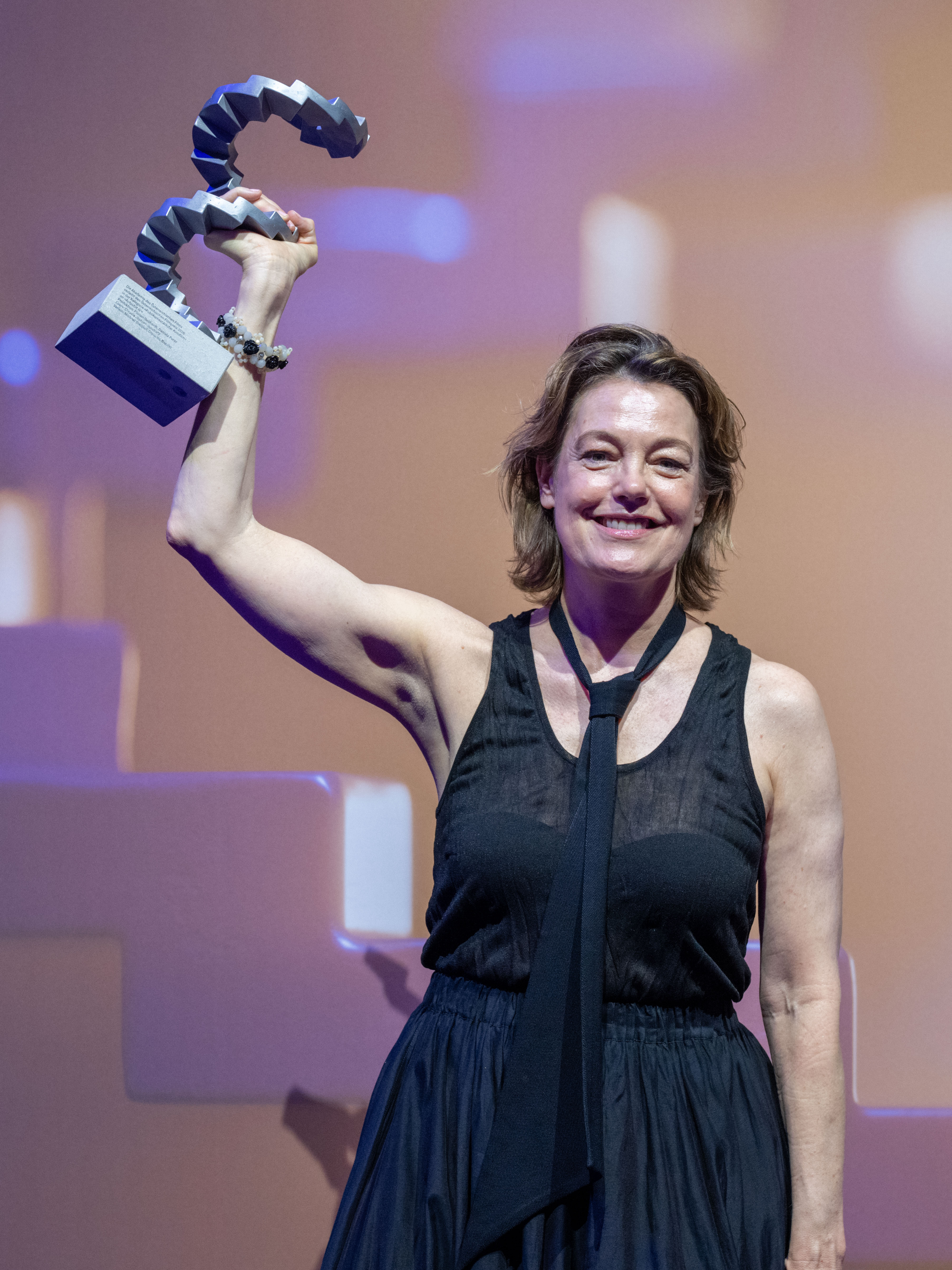
- Elke Winkens (2026)
- Born: 25 March 1970 (age 56); Linnich, Westphalia, West Germany
- Occupation: Actress
- Years active: 1995–present

Elke Winkens, née Fischer (born 25 March 1970) is an German actress. She grew up in Germany in the district Ratheim in Hückelhoven. Because of her father's work the family moved to The Netherlands and Belgium; for some time she also resided in Africa. At the age of six she took ballet classes and at the age of nine she started performing on stage. Afterwards she performed in many dance and theater acts. From 1978 to 1986 she was a professional gymnast and won several titles in floor exercise.

At the age of eighteen she got a scholarship at the London Studio Centre in London, where she was stationed between 1989 and 1991. Then she moved to Vienna and participated in the Musical School at the Theater Vienna where she studied song, dance and acting. Later she joined the cabaret performance group Die Hektiker which made her known. She got her first TV acting job in the series Cell-O-Fun which was broadcast between 1996 and 1997, and then the series called One in 1998. In 2002, she acted in the crime series Inspector Rex where she played the character Niki Herzog.

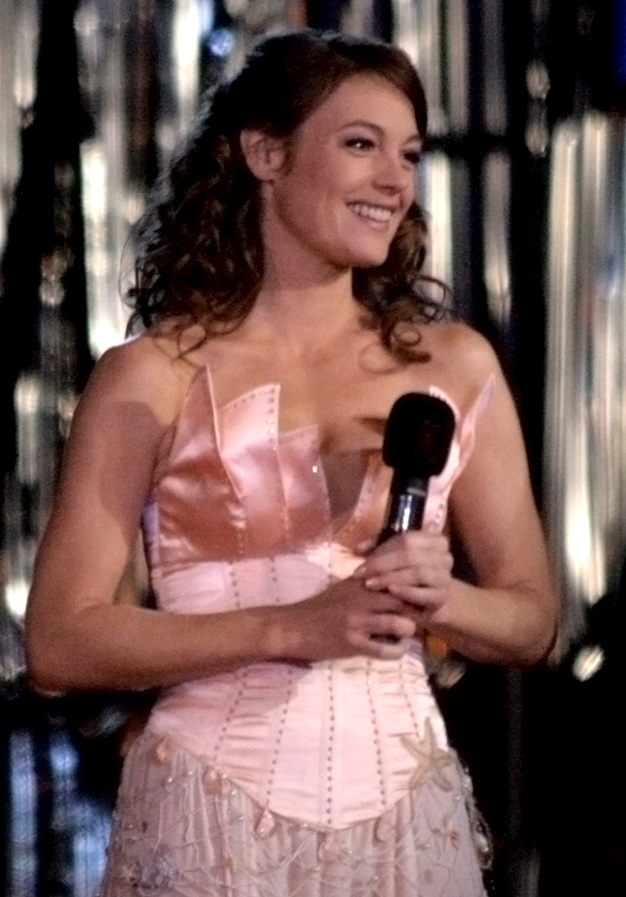
Elke Winkens in 2009

In 2003, Winkens posed for the German edition of the mens magazine Playboy and in 2008, she participated in the celebrity dancing show Dancing with the Stars which was broadcast on ORF. She was voted off just one week before the final.

In 2025, she acted in an Austrian film How to Be Normal and the Oddness of the Other World, which was selected in Perspectives at the 75th Berlin International Film Festival and will be screened in February 2025.
