= Madita =

Austrian singer and actress (born 1978)

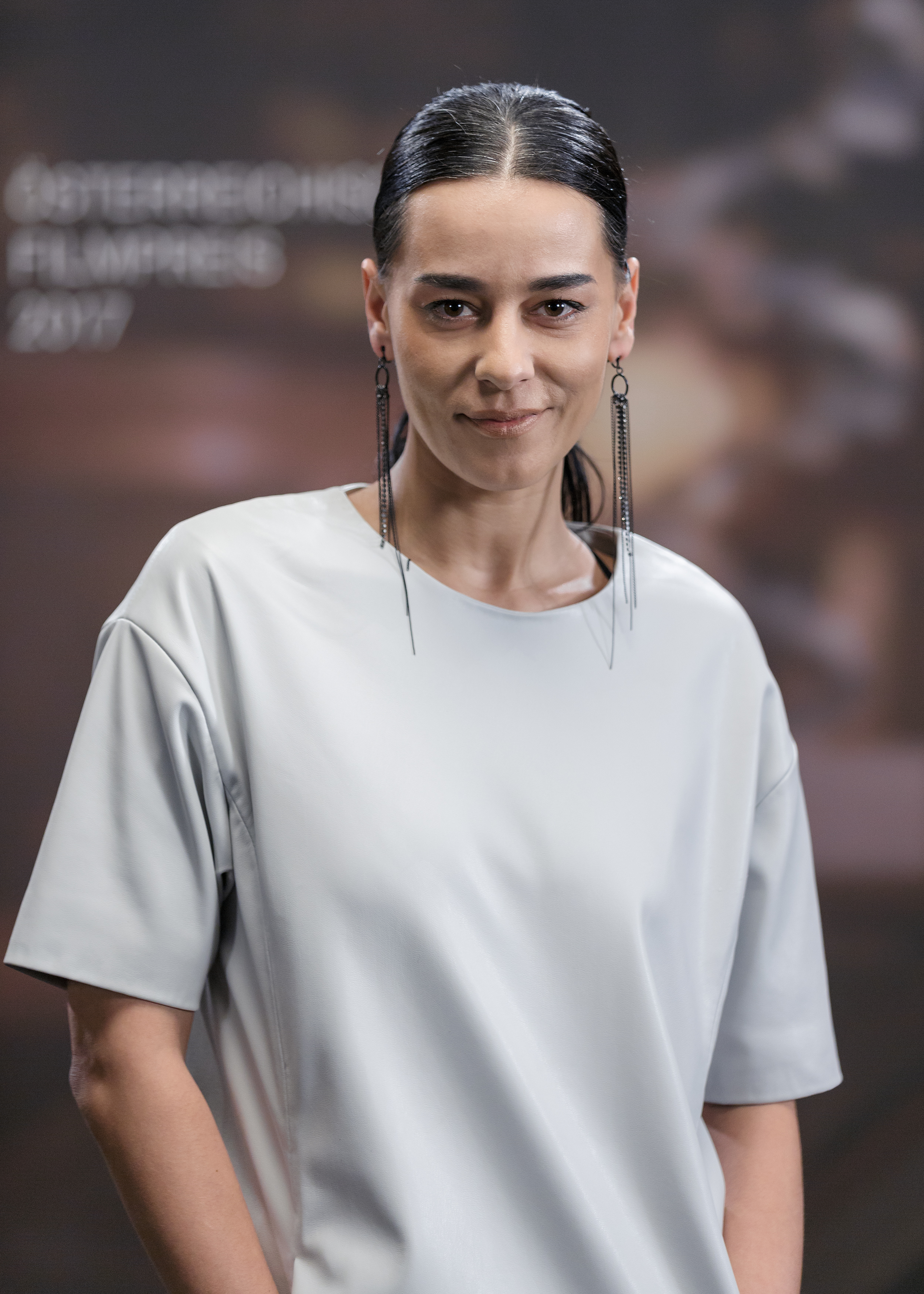
- Madita in 2017
- Born: Edita Malovčić; 21 January 1978 (age 48); Vienna, Austria
- Occupations: Singer, actor
- Years active: 1999–present
- Musical career
- Genres: Soul; funk; R&B; trip hop; nu jazz
- Label: Couch

Edita Malovčić (born 21 January 1978), known by her stage name, Madita, is an Austrian singer and actress of Bosnian descent. Her father is Bosnian folk singer Kemal Malovčić. Madita's music ranges from synth-pop to R&B to jazz.

== Early life ==
Born Edita Malovčić in Vienna, she is the daughter of Bosnian folk singer Kemal Malovčić from his first marriage, to a Serbian woman. Madita has stated that she has not been in contact with her father for many years, and that she has "no good memories" of him.

== Career ==
=== Acting ===
Malovčić studied musicology and took private acting lessons. In 1999, she acted in the Austrian film Northern Skirts, about the Bosnian War, which won several awards. After her first success, she went on to act in numerous other films, such as Berlin Is in Germany (2001), Kaltfront (2003), Želary (2003), and Four Minutes (2006). She has also appeared in various television series, including Medicopter 117, Tatort, and most recently, Capitani.

=== Music ===
Malovčić first sang in 2002, when she performed with the duo dZihan & Kamien on their album Gran Riserva. Her first solo record, Madita, was released in 2005. It reached the top 3 of the Electronic Album Chart on the iTunes Music Store. In 2007, her song "Ceylon" was featured on an episode of Damages.

In 2008, Madita released her second album, Too. Two years later, she issued Flavours, a nine-track album with five previously unreleased songs and four remixed tracks. The record was part of a larger collection, titled Madita Deluxe, which includes most of the singer's songs.

== Discography ==
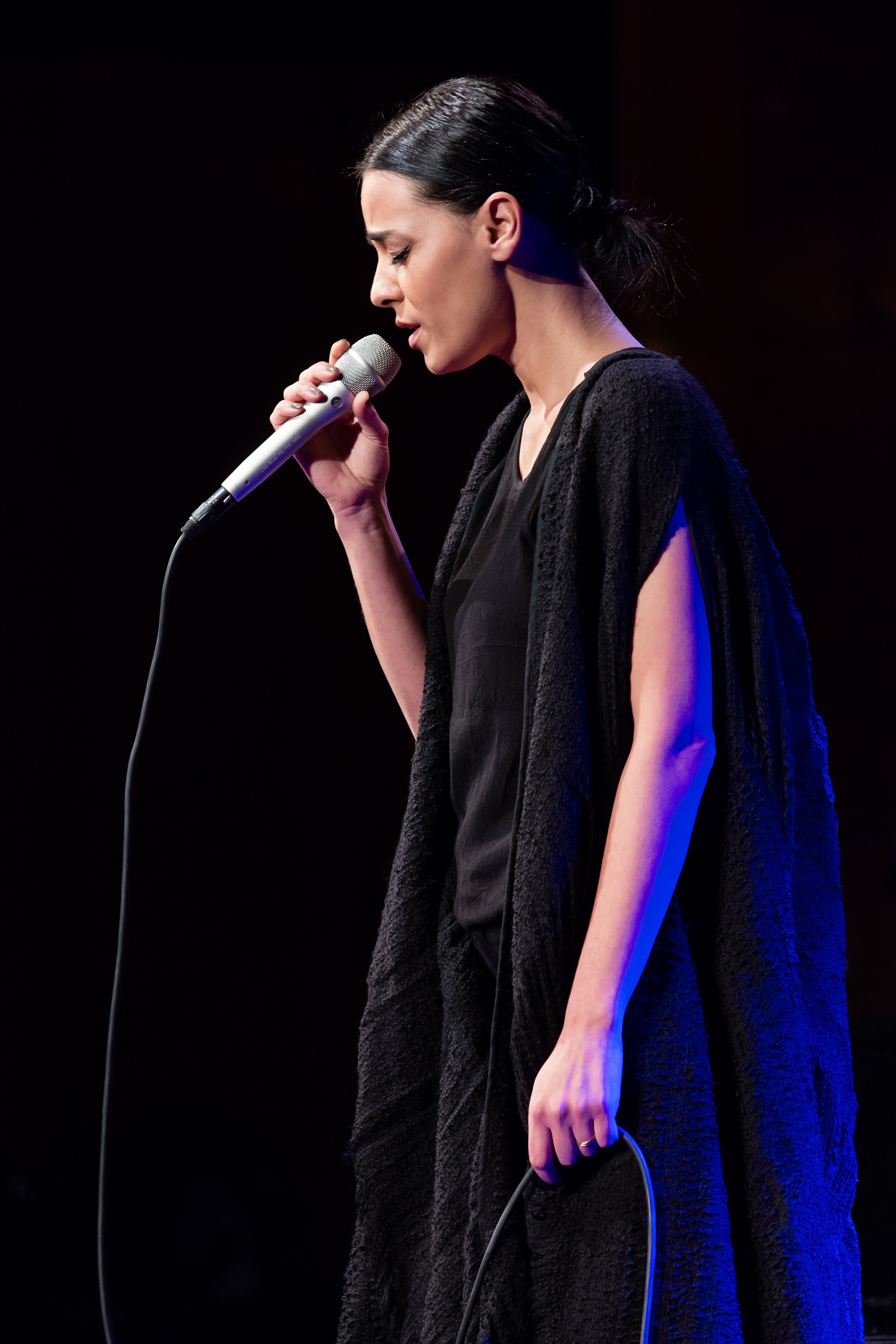
Madita performing in 2015

- Madita (2005)
- Too (2008)
- Pacemaker (2010)
- Madita Deluxe (2012)
- Flavours (2012)

== Filmography ==
=== Film ===
List of film appearances, with year, title, and role shown
Year	Title	Role	Notes
1999	Northern Skirts	Tamara	
2001	Berlin Is in Germany	Ludmila	
2003	Želary	Marie	
2003	Kaltfront	Sandra	
2006	Four Minutes	Young Traude	
2009	The Bone Man	Anna	
2009	Rabbit Without Ears 2	Marie	
2013	Blood Glacier	Tanja	
2020	Quo Vadis, Aida?	Vesna	

=== Television ===
List of television appearances, with year, title, and role shown
Year	Title	Role	Notes
2001–06	Medicopter 117	Stella Berger / Stella Cortini	25 episodes
2005–16	Tatort	Various	7 episodes
2007	Zodiak – Der Horoskop-Mörder	Linda	4 episodes
2012	Es kommt noch dicker	Manu	7 episodes
2015	Altes Geld	Tania	8 episodes
2019	Beck is Back!	Mara Markovic	3 episodes
2022	Capitani	Valentina Draga	11 episodes
