= Dancing Stars (Austrian TV series) =

Austrian celebrity talent show

- Presented by: Alfons Haider; Mirjam Weichselbraun; Klaus Eberhartinger; Norbert Oberhauser; Andi Knoll
- Judges: Nicole Hansen; Dagmar Koller; Hannes Nedbal; Thomas Schäfer-Elmayer; Harald Serafin; Guggi Löwinger; Alfons Haider; Balázs Ekker; Karina Sarkissova; Dirk Heidemann; Maria Angelini-Santner
- Country of origin: Austria

Original release
- Network: ORF eins
- Release: 10 October 2005

Dancing Stars is the Austrian version of the British reality TV competition Strictly Come Dancing and is part of the Dancing with the Stars franchise. The show broadcasts on ORF eins in Austria. The series debuted on 10 October 2005.

== Cast ==
During the first three seasons, Alfons Haider served as the primary host of Dancing Stars, while Mirjam Weichselbraun served as the backstage host. For the fourth season, Weichselbraun replaced Haider as primary host, a position she has held since, while Klaus Eberhartinger – who had won Dancing Stars' third season – took her place backstage. Alfons Haider joined the judging panel during the fourth season. For the fifth season, Haider and Eberhartinger switched roles, with Haider taking Eberhartinger's place as backstage host and Eberhartinger joining the judging panel. Beginning with the sixth season, Eberthartinger returned to his position as backstage host and remained through the thirteenth season. Norbert Oberhauser took over as backstage host in the fourteenth season, and Andi Knoll in the fifteenth.

During the first season, the judging panel consisted of Nicole Hansen, Dagmar Koller, Hannes Nedbal, and Thomas Schäfer-Elmayer. Harald Serafin replaced Koller in the second season, while Serafin was himself replaced in the third season by Guggi Löwinger. Löwinger was replaced by former co-host Alfons Haider in the fourth season, and Haider switched roles with former co-host Klaus Eberhartinger in the fifth season. Nicole Hansen, Hannes Nedbal, and Thomas Schäfer-ElmayerIn were joined on the judging panel in season six by a series of guest judges, including Karina Sarkissova, who became a permanent judge beginning with the eleventh season. Beginning with the seventh season, Balázs Ekker, who had been a professional dancer on the cast since the first season, joined the judging panel as the permanent fourth judge. Nedbal and Schäfer-Elmayer left the judging panel at the end of the tenth season and were replaced by Dirk Heidemann and Karina Sarkissova. Heidemann and Nicole Hansen left after the thirteenth season, while Maria Angelini-Santner joined the judging panel for the fourteenth season. Sarkissova left after the fourteenth season, but returned as a celebrity contestant for the fifteenth season, although she was forced to withdraw from the competition after the first performance for health reasons.

Color key

Host
Judge
Contestant
Professional dancer

Cast member	Season															
Cast member	1	2	3	4	5	6	7	8	9	10	11	12	13	14	15	16
Alfons Haider	●	●	●	●	●	●										
Mirjam Weichselbraun	●	●	●	●	●	●	●	●	●	●	●	●		●	●	●
Klaus Eberhartinger			●	●	●	●	●	●	●	●	●	●	●			
Kristina Inhof													●	●		
Norbert Oberhauser														●		
Andi Knoll															●	●
Nicole Hansen	●	●	●	●	●	●	●	●	●	●	●	●	●			
Dagmar Koller	●															
Hannes Nedbal	●	●	●	●	●	●	●	●	●	●						
Thomas Schäfer-Elmayer	●	●	●	●	●	●	●	●	●	●						
Harald Serafin		●														
Guggi Löwinger			●													
Balázs Ekker	●	●	●	●	●	●	●	●	●	●	●	●	●	●	●	●
Karina Sarkissova											●	●	●	●	●	
Dirk Heidemann											●	●	●			
Maria Angelini-Santner														●	●	●

== Couples ==
Color key:

Winners
Runners-up
Third place
Withdrew from competition

Professional dancer	Season														
Professional dancer	1	2	3	4	5	6	7	8	9	10	11	12	13	14	15
Christina Auer	Stefano Bernardin				Vincent Bueno										
Balázs Ekker	Arabella Kiesbauer	Nicole Beutler	Nina Proll	Jeannine Schiller	Gitta Saxx	Astrid Wirtenberger									
Michaela Heintzinger	Toni Polster	Gregor Bloéb	Harry Prünster	Peter Tichatschek	Ramesh Nair										
Andy Kainz	Marika Lichter	Gerda Rogers	Stephanie Graf	Elke Winkens	Claudia Reiterer										
Kelly Kainz	Mat Schuh	Manuel Ortega	Klaus Eberhartinger	Marc Pircher		Reinhard Nowak									
Alexander Kreissl	Patricia Kaiser	Simone Stelzer	Hera Lind	Claudia Stöckl	Sandra Pires										
Julia Polai	Peter Rapp	Andreas Goldberger	Peter L. Eppinger	Oliver Stamm	Christoph Fälbl	Mike Galeli									
Manfred Zehender	Barbara Rett	Ulrike Beimpold	Timna Brauer	Christine Reiler	Tini Kainrath										
Elke Gehrsitz		Hans Georg Heinke													
Nicole Kuntner		Edi Finger Jr.	Michael Konsel	Dorian Steidl	Andy Lee Lang										
Alexander Zaglmaier		Barbara Karlich	Zabine Kapfinger	Elisabeth Engstler	Marie-Christine Friedrich										
Alice Guschelbauer			Michael Tschuggnall	Hans Kreuzmayr (Waterloo)	Gerhard Zadrobilek	Markus Wolfahrt									
Gerhard Egger					Maggie Entenfellner	Mirna Jukić	Dolly Buster	Doris Schretzmayer	Lisbeth Bischoff						
Babsi Koitz-Baumann					Udo Wenders	Uwe Kröger	Marco Ventre	Rudi Roubinek							
Werner Figar						Christine Kaufmann									
Vadim Garbuzov						Alfons Haider	Petra Frey	Susanna Hirschler	Roxanne Rapp						
Florian Gschaider						Alexandra Meissnitzer	Sueli Menezes	Monika Salzer		Verena Scheitz	Monica Weinzettl			Jasmin Ouschan	Lilan Klebow
Kathrin Menzinger						Dieter Chmelar	David Heissig	Lukas Perman	Hubert Neuper						
Christoph Santner						Cathy Zimmermann	Katerina Jacob	Katharina Gutensohn	Andrea Puschl						
Roswitha Wieland						James Cottriall	Frank Schinkels	Gerald Pichowetz	Daniel Serafin	Thomas Morgenstern	Otto Retzer	Stefan Petzner	Christian Dolezal		
Anna Chalak-Bock							Wolfram Pirchner								
Willi Gabalier							Brigitte Kren	Marjan Shaki		Martha Butbul	Nicole Hosp		Michaela Kirchgasser		
Thomas Kraml							Eva Maria Marold	Angelika Ahrens	Andrea Buday	Sabine Petzl	Ana Milva Gomes	Elisabeth Görgl			
Lenka Pohoralek							Albert Fortell	Gregor Glanz	Erik Schinegger	Thomas May	Walter Schachner			Otto Konrad	Lucas Fendrich
Maria Santner							Michael Schönborn	Biko Botowamungu	Marco Angelini	Georgij Makazaria	Martin Ferdiny				
Manuela Stöckl								Rainer Schönfelder				Martin Leutgeb		Niko Niko	Alexander Pointner
Julia Burghardt									Morteza Tavakoli			Peter Hackmair		Boris Bukowski	
Danilo Campisi									Melanie Binder		Eser Ari-Akbaba		Silvia Schneider	Caroline Athanasiadis	Corinna Kamper
Cornelia Kreuter										Fadi Merza	Norbert Schneider	Michael Schottenberg	Cesár Sampson		
Paul Lorenz										Nina Hartmann					
Andy Pohl										Heidi Neururer					
Alexandra Scheriau										Gery Keszler	Volker Piesczek	Virginia Ernst	Marcos Nader		
Dimitar Stefanin											Riem Higazi	Nicole Wesner	Tamara Mascara	Kristina Inhof	Missy May
Florian Vana												Sunnyi Melles	Edita Malovčić		
Vesela Dimova													Andreas Ogris	Bernhard Kohl	
Stefan Herzog													Natalia Ushakova	Nina Kraft	
Catharina Malek													Norbert Oberhauser		Hannes Kartnig
Kati Kallus														Faris Endris Rahoma	Omar Khir Alanam
Michael Kaufmann														Margaretha Tiesel	
Peter Erlbeck															Eveline Eselböck
Herbert Stanonik															Michael Buchinger
Nikolaus Waltl															Martina Reuter

== Seasons ==
=== Season 1 ===
Couples

Celebrity	Notability	Professional partner	Status
Mat Schuh	Singer	Kelly Kainz	Eliminated 1st
Arabella Kiesbauer	Television host	Balázs Ekker	Eliminated 2nd
Peter Rapp	ORF host	Julia Polai	Eliminated 3rd
Patricia Kaiser	Miss Austria 2000 & javelin thrower	Alexander Kreissl	Eliminated 4th
Stefano Bernardin	Stage & screen actor	Christina Auer	Eliminated 5th
Barbara Rett	ORF host	Manfred Zehender	Eliminated 6th
Toni Polster	Soccer player & coach	Michaela Heintzinger	Runners-up
Marika Lichter	Musical actress	Andy Kainz	Winners

Weekly scores

Color key:

Winners
Runners-up
Eliminated

Dancing Stars (season 1) - Weekly scores
Couple	Pl.	Week							
Couple	Pl.	1	2	3	4	5	6	7	8
Marika & Andy	1st	24	27	23	29	28	32+36=68	33+34=67	27+34+33=94 (Note: This couple finished in first place.)
Toni & Michaela	2nd	27	27	30	33	34	31+36=67	35+37=72	34+30+38=102 (Note: This couple finished in second place.)
Barbara & Manfred	3rd	24	24	27	25	28	26+29=55	30+27=57 (Note: This couple was eliminated.)	
Stefano & Christina	4th	29	31	32	27	29	31+28=59		
Patricia & Alexander	5th	21	28	25	27	27			
Peter & Julia	6th	23	21	21	24				
Arabella & Balázs	7th	22	24	26					
Mat & Kelly	8th	19	22						

=== Season 2 ===
Couples

Celebrity	Notability	Professional partner	Status
Gerda Rogers	Astrologer	Andy Kainz	Eliminated 1st
Ulrike Beimpold	Actress & director	Manfred Zehender	Eliminated 2nd
Edi Finger Jr.	Radio sportscaster	Nicole Kuntner	Eliminated 3rd
Barbara Karlich	Television host	Alexander Zaglmaier	Eliminated 4th
Gregor Bloéb	Stage & screen actor	Michaela Heintzinger	Eliminated 5th
Simone Stelzer	Singer	Alexander Kreissl	Eliminated 6th
Hans Georg Heinke	Journalist & newscaster	Elke Gehrsitz	Eliminated 7th
Nicole Beutler	Stage & screen actress	Balázs Ekker	Third place
Andreas Goldberger	Ski jumping	Julia Polai	Runners-up
Manuel Ortega	Singer	Kelly Kainz	Winners

Weekly scores

Color key:

Winners
Runners-up
Third place
Eliminated

Dancing Stars (season 2) - Weekly scores
Couple	Pl.	Week							
Couple	Pl.	1	2	3	4	5	6	7	8
Manuel & Kelly	1st	25	29	34	35	34	36+34=70	37+33=70	38+35+40=113 (Note: This couple finished in first place.)
Andreas & Julia	2nd	24	21	24	28	27	24+32=56	34+35=69	33+39+37=109 (Note: This couple finished in second place.)
Nicole & Balázs	3rd	30	32	32	35	33	36+33=69	33+38=71	35+39+37=111 (Note: This couple finished in third place.)
Hans & Elke	4th	24	23	22	32	24	21+32=53	33+31=64 (Note: This couple was eliminated.)	
Simone & Alexander	5th	28	27	29	33	27	28+32=60		
Gregor & Michaela	6th	23	30	32	31	30			
Barbara & Alexander	7th	24	29	29	32				
Edi & Nicole	8th	16	21	23					
Ulrike & Manfred	9th	29	26						
Gerda & Andy	10th	20							

=== Season 3 ===
Couples

Celebrity	Notability	Professional partner	Status
Timna Brauer	Singer-songwriter	Manfred Zehender	Eliminated 1st
Hera Lind	Author	Alexander Kreissl	Eliminated 2nd
Stephanie Graf	Olympic sprinter	Andy Kainz	Eliminated 3rd
Michael Konsel	Soccer player	Nicole Kuntner	Eliminated 4th
Harry Prünster	Television host	Michaela Heintzinger	Eliminated 5th
Nina Proll	Stage & screen actress	Balázs Ekker	Eliminated 6th
Michael Tschuggnall	Singer & Starmania winner	Alice Guschelbauer	Eliminated 7th
Zabine Kapfinger	Singer	Alexander Zaglmaier	Third place
Peter L. Eppinger	Ö3 host	Julia Polai	Runners-up
Klaus Eberhartinger	Singer & television host	Kelly Kainz	Winners

=== Season 4 ===
Couples

Celebrity	Notability	Professional partner	Status
Claudia Stöckl	Ö3 host	Alexander Kreissl	Eliminated 1st
Peter Tichatschek	Journalist & television host	Michaela Heintzinger	Eliminated 2nd
Oliver Stamm	Olympic beach volleyballer	Julia Polai	Eliminated 3rd
Christine Reiler	Model & Miss Austria 2007	Manfred Zehender	Eliminated 4th
Marc Pircher	Singer	Kelly Kainz	Eliminated 5th
Jeannine Schiller	Model	Balázs Ekker	Eliminated 6th
Hans Kreuzmayr (Waterloo)	Waterloo and Robinson singer	Alice Guschlbauer	Eliminated 7th
Elke Winkens	Stage & screen actress	Andy Kainz	Eliminated 8th
Elisabeth Engstler	Singer & television host	Alexander Zaglmaier	Runners-up
Dorian Steidl	Television host	Nicole Kuntner	Winners

Weekly scores

Color key:

Winners
Runners-up
Eliminated

Dancing Stars (season 4) - Weekly scores
Couple	Pl.	Week								
Couple	Pl.	1	2	3	4	5	6	7	8	9
Dorian & Nicole	1st	25	25	27	30	33	30+29=59	31+31=62	34+35=69	34+38=72 (Note: This couple finished in first place.)
Elisabeth & Alexander	2nd	25	31	28	35	37	32+36=68	36+37=73	38+38=76	40+40=80 (Note: This couple finished in second place.)
Elke & Andy	3rd	27	30	32	28	36	35+33=68	37+35=72	39+39=78 (Note: This couple was eliminated.)	
Waterloo & Alice	4th	15	24	18	21	22	29+25=54	26+29=55		
Jeannine & Balázs	5th	16	19	18	20	26	23+24=47			
Marc & Kelly	6th	22	28	28	22	30				
Christine & Manfred	7th	22	24	24	24					
Oliver & Julia	8th	20	25	25						
Peter & Michaela	9th	21	23							
Claudia & Alexander	10th	19								

Notes

Dance chart

Couple	Week													
Couple	1	2	3	4	5		6		7		8		9	
Dorian & Nicole	Waltz	Rumba	Tango	Paso doble	Samba	Group; Viennese waltz	Cha-cha-cha	Quickstep	Jive	Foxtrot	Paso doble	Viennese waltz	Waltz	Showdance
Elisabeth & Alexander	Waltz	Rumba	Tango	Paso doble	Samba	Group; Viennese waltz	Jive	Foxtrot	Cha-cha-cha	Quickstep	Paso doble	Viennese waltz	Foxtrot	Showdance
Elke & Andy	Cha-cha-cha	Quickstep	Jive	Foxtrot	Samba	Group; Viennese waltz	Rumba	Tango	Paso doble	Waltz	Paso doble	Viennese waltz		
Waterloo & Alice	Cha-cha-cha	Quickstep	Jive	Foxtrot	Samba	Group; Viennese waltz	Paso doble	Waltz	Rumba	Tango				
Jeannine & Balázs	Cha-cha-cha	Quickstep	Jive	Foxtrot	Samba	Group; Viennese waltz	Paso doble	Waltz						
Marc & Kelly	Cha-cha-cha	Quickstep	Jive	Foxtrot	Samba	Group; Viennese waltz								
Christine & Manfred	Waltz	Rumba	Tango	Paso doble										
Oliver & Julia	Cha-cha-cha	Quickstep	Tango											
Peter & Michaela	Waltz	Rumba												
Claudia & Alexander	Waltz													

=== Season 5 ===
Couples

Celebrity	Notability	Professional partner	Status
Christoph Fälbl	Stage & screen actor	Julia Polai	Eliminated 1st
Marie-Christine Friedrich	Film & television actress	Alexander Zaglmaier	Eliminated 2nd
Andy Lee Lang	Musician	Nicole Kuntner	Eliminated 3rd
Gerhard Zadrobilek	Tour de France cyclist	Alice Guschelbauer	Eliminated 4th
Maggie Entenfellner	Journalist & television host	Gerhard Egger	Eliminated 5th
Vincent Bueno	Singer & Musical! Die Show winner	Christina Auer	Eliminated 6th
Gitta Saxx	Model & photographer	Balázs Ekker	Eliminated 7th
Sandra Pires	Singer	Alexander Kreissl	Eliminated 8th
Tini Kainrath	Actress & singer	Manfred Zehender	Eliminated 9th
Udo Wenders	Singer	Babsi Koitz	Third place
Ramesh Nair	Choreographer, singer & dancer	Michaela Heintzinger	Runners-up
Claudia Reiterer	Journalist & television host	Andy Kainz	Winners

Weekly scores

Color key:

Winners
Runners-up
Third place
Eliminated

Dancing Stars (season 5) - Weekly scores
Couple	Pl.	Week									
Couple	Pl.	1	2	3	4	5	6	7	8	9	10
Claudia & Andy	1st	—	27	33	31	30	34	31+37=68	34+38=72	35+36=71	40+36=76 (Note: This couple finished in first place.)
Ramesh & Michaela	2nd	28	—	27	32	27	32	31+34=65	32+36=68	39+36=75	40+33=73 (Note: This couple finished in second place.)
Udo & Barbara	3rd	20	—	27	30	29	27	26+29=55	28+33=61	28+26=54	30+27=57 (Note: This couple finished in third place.)
Tini & Manfred	4th	—	26	29	25	28	30	26+30=56	29+32=61	27+32=59 (Note: This couple was eliminated.)	
Sandra & Alexander	5th	—	31	26	29	27	32	25+29=54	28+31=59		
Gitta & Balazs	6th	—	22	25	28	31	29	32+27=59			
Vincent & Christina	7th	23	—	26	24	22	26				
Maggie & Gerhard	8th	—	20	23	20	21					
Gerhard & Alice	9th	17	—	19	14						
Andy & Nicole	10th	15	—	17							
Marie-Christine & Alexander	11th	—	25								
Christoph & Julia	12th	15									

=== Season 6 ===
Couples

Celebrity	Notability	Professional partner	Status
James Cottriall	Singer	Roswitha Wieland	Eliminated 1st
Christine Kaufmann	Actress	Werner Figar	Eliminated 2nd
Markus Wolfahrt	Die Klostertaler lead singer	Alice Guschlbauer	Eliminated 3rd
Reinhard Nowak	Cabaret artist & actor	Kelly Kainz	Eliminated 4th
Uwe Kröger	Singer & stage actor	Babsi Koitz	Eliminated 5th
Dieter Chmelar	Journalist & television presenter	Kathrin Menzinger	Eliminated 6th
Cathy Zimmermann	Model & television presenter	Christoph Santner	Eliminated 7th
Mirna Jukić	Olympic swimmer	Gerhard Egger	Eliminated 8th
Alfons Haider	Dancing Stars presenter	Vadim Garbuzov	Eliminated 9th
Mike Galeli	Film & television actor	Julia Polai	Third place
Alexandra Meissnitzer	Olympic alpine skier	Florian Gschaider	Runners-up
Astrid Wirtenberger	Die Seer singer	Balázs Ekker	Winners

Weekly scores

Color key:

Winners
Runners-up
Third place
Bottom two
Eliminated

Dancing Stars (season 6) - Weekly scores
Couple	Pl.	Week									
Couple	Pl.	1	2	3	4	5	6	7	8	9	10
Astrid & Balázs	1st	—	32	32	29	30	30	33	37+36=73 (Note: This couple was in the bottom two, but was not eliminated.)	34+34=68	40+40=80 (Note: This couple finished in first place.)
Alexandra & Florian	2nd	—	27	15	25	25	28	25	32+35=67	36+34=70	39+37=76 (Note: This couple finished in second place.)
Mike & Julia	3rd	25	—	26	28	25	32	29	27+29=56	31+33=64	34+37=71 (Note: This couple finished in third place.)
Alfons & Vadim	4th	—	23	26	22	32	26	29	31+29=60	33+34=67 (Note: This couple was eliminated.)	
Mirna & Gerhard	5th	—	23	22	32	27	28	34	33+31=64		
Cathy & Christoph	6th	—	32	28	30	33	34	31			
Dieter & Kathrin	7th	17	—	15	19	19	17				
Uwe & Babsi	8th	27	—	31	30	26					
Reinhard & Kelly	9th	17	—	19	22						
Markus & Alice	10th	17	—	19							
Christine & Werner	11th	—	22								
James & Roswitha	12th	21									

Notes

Dance chart

Dancing Stars (season 6) - Dance chart
Couple	Week															
Couple	1	2	3	4	5	6		7		8		9		10		
Astrid & Balázs	Group; Salsa	Cha-cha-cha	Tango	Paso doble	Viennese waltz	Rumba	Group; Charleston	Waltz	Group; American Smooth	Jive	Mambo	Samba	Quickstep	Jive	Foxtrot	Showdance
Alexandra & Florian	Group; Salsa	Waltz	Jive	Foxtrot	Samba	Viennese waltz	Group; Charleston	Rumba	Group; American Smooth	Tango	Mambo	Quickstep	Paso doble	Tango	Cha-cha-cha	Showdance
Mike & Julia	Rumba	Group; Salsa	Tango	Paso doble	Viennese waltz	Cha-cha-cha	Group; Charleston	Quickstep	Group; American Smooth	Jive	Mambo	Waltz	Samba	Cha-cha-cha	Foxtrot	Showdance
Alfons & Vadim	Group; Salsa	Cha-cha-cha	Tango	Paso doble	Viennese waltz	Jive	Group; Charleston	Foxtrot	Group; American Smooth	Waltz	Mambo	Rumba	Quickstep			
Mirna & Gerhard	Group; Salsa	Cha-cha-cha	Tango	Paso doble	Viennese waltz	Samba	Group; Charleston	Quickstep	Group; American Smooth	Rumba	Mambo					
Cathy & Christoph	Group; Salsa	Waltz	Jive	Foxtrot	Samba	Quickstep	Group; Charleston	Cha-cha-cha	Group; American Smooth							
Dieter & Kathrin	Quickstep	Group; Salsa	Jive	Foxtrot	Samba	Waltz	Group; Charleston									
Uwe & Babsi	Quickstep	Group; Salsa	Jive	Foxtrot	Samba											
Reinhard & Kelly	Quickstep	Group; Salsa	Jive	Foxtrot												
Markus & Alice	Rumba	Group; Salsa	Tango													
Christine & Werner	Group; Salsa	Waltz														
James & Roswitha	Rumba															

=== Season 7 ===
Couples

Celebrity	Notability	Professional partner	Status
Katerina Jacob	Television actress	Christoph Santner	Eliminated 1st
Albert Fortell	Actor & screenwriter	Lenka Marosiová	Eliminated 2nd
Michael Schönborn	Actor	Maria Jahn	Eliminated 3rd
David Heissig	Actor	Kathrin Menzinger	Eliminated 4th
Sueli Menezes	Author	Florian Gschaider	Eliminated 5th
Wolfram Pirchner	Television presenter	Anna Chalak-Bock	Eliminated 6th
Dolly Buster	Actress & artist	Gerhard Egger	Eliminated 7th
Eva Maria Marold	Actress & singer	Thomas Kraml	Eliminated 8th
Brigitte Kren	Actress	Willi Gabalier	Eliminated 9th
Marco Ventre	Presenter & musician	Babsi Koitz	Third place
Frenkie Schinkels	Football manager	Roswitha Wieland	Runners-up
Petra Frey	Schlager singer	Vadim Garbuzov	Winners

Weekly scores

Color key:

Winners
Runners-up
Third place
Bottom two
Eliminated

Dancing Stars (season 7) - Weekly scores
Couple	Pl.	Week									
Couple	Pl.	1	2	3	4	5	6	7	8	9	10
Petra & Vadim	1st	30	—	28	30	30	31	32	33+37=70 (Note: This couple was in the bottom two, but was not eliminated.)	37+39=76	39+39=78 (Note: This couple finished in first place.)
Frenkie & Roswitha	2nd	—	19	21	26	16	25	23	29+28=57	24+32=56	28+34=62 (Note: This couple finished in second place.)
Marco & Babsi	3rd	—	25	21	21	29	26	24	24+25=49	29+29=58	30+33=63 (Note: This couple finished in third place.)
Brigitte & Willi	4th	23	—	30	23	30	29	29	32+31=63	31+35=66 (Note: This couple was eliminated.)	
Eva Maria & Thomas	5th	26	—	27	29	24	32	31	35+33=68		
Dolly & Gerhard	6th	20	—	24	15	14	15	18			
Wolfram & Anna	7th	—	15	12	18	16	17				
Sueli & Florian	8th	27	—	30	32	25					
David & Kathrin	9th	—	20	24	23						
Michael & Maria	10th	—	15	15							
Albert & Lenka	11th	—	12								
Katerina & Christoph	12th	25									

Notes

Dance chart

Dancing Stars (season 7) - Dance chart
Couple	Week															
Couple	1	2	3	4	5	6		7		8		9		10		
Petra & Vadim	Cha-cha-cha	Group; Salsa	Tango	Paso doble	Viennese waltz	Rumba	Group; Argentine tango	Quickstep	Group; Charleston	Mambo	Jive	Samba	Waltz	Foxtrot	Jive	Showdance
Frenkie & Roswitha	Group; Salsa	Rumba	Tango	Paso doble	Viennese waltz	Cha-cha-cha	Group; Argentine tango	Quickstep	Group; Charleston	Jive	Mambo	Waltz	Samba	Foxtrot	Paso doble	Showdance
Marco & Babsi	Group; Salsa	Rumba	Tango	Paso doble	Viennese waltz	Jive	Group; Argentine tango	Foxtrot	Group; Charleston	Mambo	Cha-cha-cha	Waltz	Quickstep	Samba	Quickstep	Showdance
Brigitte & Willi	Waltz	Group; Salsa	Jive	Foxtrot	Samba	Tango	Group; Argentine tango	Rumba	Group; Charleston	Mambo	Quickstep	Cha-cha-cha	Viennese waltz			
Eva Maria & Thomas	Cha-cha-cha	Group; Salsa	Tango	Paso doble	Viennese waltz	Jive	Group; Argentine tango	Waltz	Group; Charleston	Rumba	Mambo					
Dolly & Gerhard	Waltz	Group; Salsa	Jive	Foxtrot	Samba	Quickstep	Group; Argentine tango	Cha-cha-cha	Group; Charleston							
Wolfram & Anna	Group; Salsa	Quickstep	Jive	Foxtrot	Samba	Waltz	Group; Argentine tango									
Sueli & Florian	Cha-cha-cha	Group; Salsa	Tango	Paso doble	Viennese waltz											
David & Kathrin	Group; Salsa	Quickstep	Jive	Foxtrot												
Michael & Maria	Group; Salsa	Quickstep	Jive													
Albert & Lenka	Group; Salsa	Rumba														
Katerina & Christoph	Waltz															

=== Season 8 ===
Couples

Celebrity	Notability	Professional partner	Status
Katharina Gutensohn	Olympic alpine skier	Christoph Santner	Eliminated 1st
Doris Schretzmayer	Actress	Gerhard Egger	Eliminated 2nd
Rudi Roubinek	Actor	Babsi Koitz	Eliminated 3rd
Gerald Pichowetz	Actor	Roswitha Wieland	Eliminated 4th
Monika Salzer	Columnist	Florian Gschaider	Eliminated 5th
Gregor Glanz	Singer	Lenka Pohoralek	Eliminated 6th
Biko Botowamungu	Boxer	Maria Jahn	Eliminated 7th
Susanna Hirschler	Actress	Vadim Garbuzov	Eliminated 8th
Angelika Ahrens	Television presenter	Thomas Kraml	Eliminated 9th
Lukas Perman	Singer & actor	Kathrin Menzinger	Third place
Marjan Shaki	Singer & actress	Willi Gabalier	Runners-up
Rainer Schönfelder	Olympic alpine skier	Manuela Stöckl	Winners

Weekly scores

Color key:

Winners
Runners-up
Third place
Exempt from competition for the week
Bottom two
Eliminated

Dancing Stars (season 8) - Weekly scores
Couple	Pl.	Week												
Couple	Pl.	1	2	3	1/2+3	4	5	6	7	8	9	10	11	12
Rainer & Manuela	1st	27	—	30	57	29	30	35	30	31	26 (Note: This couple was in the bottom two, but was not eliminated.)	27+24=51	33+38=71	31+37=68 (Note: This couple finished in first place.)
Marjan & Willi	2nd	—	28	28	56	30	27	28	32	30	34	34+36=70	32+36=68	35+39=74 (Note: This couple finished in second place.)
Lukas & Kathrin	3rd	25	—	29	54	27	29	30	28	34	29	34+30=64	33+34=67	34+38=72 (Note: This couple finished in third place.)
Angelika & Thomas	4th	—	23	24	47	24	30	28	23	27	31	33+27=60	32+30=62 (Note: This couple was eliminated.)	
Susanna & Vadim	5th	—	28	27	55	29	31	33	30	29	31	31+31=62		
Biko & Maria	6th	10	—	12	22	13	13	12	13	17	14			
Gregor & Lenka	7th	19	—	21	40	23	27	30	25	25				
Monika & Florian	8th	—	12	13	25	14	16	15	19					
Gerald & Roswitha	9th	15	—	17	32	18	19	14						
Rudi & Babsi	10th	14	—	—		17	17							
Doris & Gerhard	11th	—	16	16	32	22								
Katharina & Christoph	12th	—	21	17	38									

Notes

Dance chart

Dancing Stars (season 8) - Dance chart
Couple	Week																	
Couple	1	2	3	4	5	6	7	8		9		10		11		12		
Rainer & Manuela	Cha-cha-cha	Group; Mambo	Tango	Jive	Viennese waltz	Paso doble	Foxtrot	Rumba	Group; American Smooth	Waltz	Group; Charleston	Samba	Disco	Quickstep	Jitterbug	Disco	Paso doble	Showdance
Marjan & Willi	Group; Mambo	Rumba	Tango	Paso doble	Viennese waltz	Samba	Waltz	Jive	Group; American Smooth	Foxtrot	Group; Charleston	Cha-cha-cha	Disco	Quickstep	Jitterbug	Viennese waltz	Disco	Showdance
Lukas & Kathrin	Waltz	Group; Mambo	Jive	Tango	Paso doble	Quickstep	Rumba	Foxtrot	Group; American Smooth	Cha-cha-cha	Group; Charleston	Viennese waltz	Disco	Samba	Jitterbug	Waltz	Jitterbug	Showdance
Angelika & Thomas	Group; Mambo	Rumba	Viennese waltz	Jive	Foxtrot	Paso doble	Quickstep	Cha-cha-cha	Group; American Smooth	Tango	Group; Charleston	Samba	Disco	Waltz	Jitterbug			
Susanna & Vadim	Group; Mambo	Quickstep	Paso doble	Foxtrot	Samba	Waltz	Rumba	Tango	Group; American Smooth	Jive	Group; Charleston	Viennese waltz	Disco					
Biko & Maria	Waltz	Group; Mambo	Paso doble	Foxtrot	Samba	Tango	Cha-cha-cha	Viennese waltz	Group; American Smooth	Rumba	Group; Charleston							
Gregor & Lenka	Cha-cha-cha	Group; Mambo	Foxtrot	Paso doble	Tango	Jive	Viennese waltz	Samba	Group; American Smooth									
Monika & Florian	Group; Mambo	Rumba	Foxtrot	Samba	Tango	Cha-cha-cha	Waltz											
Gerald & Roswitha	Cha-cha-cha	Group; Mambo	Viennese waltz	Samba	Foxtrot	Rumba												
Rudi & Babsi	Waltz	Group; Mambo		Viennese waltz	Jive													
Doris & Gerhard	Group; Mambo	Quickstep	Samba	Tango														
Katharina & Christoph	Group; Mambo	Quickstep	Jive															

=== Season 9 ===
Couples

Celebrity	Notability	Professional partner	Status
Andrea Buday	Socialite	Thomas Kraml	Eliminated 1st
Andrea Puschl	Television presenter	Christoph Santner	Eliminated 2nd
Daniel Serafin	Son of Harald Serafin	Roswitha Wieland	Eliminated 3rd
Morteza Tavakoli	Actor	Julia Burghardt	Eliminated 4th
Erik Schinegger	FIS Alpine World Ski Champion	Lenka Pohoralek	Withdrew
Lisbeth Bischoff	Royal expert	Gerhard Egger	Eliminated 5th
Melanie Binder	Sister of Mirjam Weichselbraun	Danilo Campisi	Eliminated 6th
Hubert Neuper	Ski jumper	Kathrin Menzinger	Third place
Marco Angelini	Singer & reality television star	Maria Santner	Runners-up
Roxanne Rapp	Daughter of Peter Rapp	Vadim Garbuzov	Winners

Weekly scores

Color key:

Winners
Runners-up
Third place
Bottom two
Withdrew from competition
Eliminated

Dancing Stars (season 9) - Weekly scores
Couple	Pl.	Week											
Couple	Pl.	1	2	3	1/2+3	4	5	6	7	8	7+8	9	10
Roxanne & Vadim	1st	—	21	23	44 (Note: This couple was in the bottom two, but was not eliminated.)	27	29	34+9=43	32+34=66	31+34=65	131	35+38=73	35+40=75 (Note: This couple finished in first place.)
Marco & Maria	2nd	24	—	22	46	25	24	28+6=34	26+29=55	34+28=62	117	31+31=62	32+37=69 (Note: This couple finished in second place.)
Hubert & Kathrin	3rd	22	—	21	43	20	27	29+7=36	25+33=58	25+25=50	108	34+32=66	29+36=65 (Note: This couple finished in third place.)
Melanie & Danilo	4th	—	21	26	47	21	29	26+8=34	30+33=63	29+30=59	122	35+34=69 (Note: This couple was eliminated.)	
Lisbeth & Gerhard	5th	—	13	11	24	16	14	15+4=19	18+29=47	18+18=36	83		
Erik & Lenka	6th	14	—	18	32	12	16	18+5=23	34 (Note: This couple withdrew from the competition.)				
Morteza & Julia	7th	18	—	29	47	31	25	23+10=33					
Daniel & Roswitha	8th	19	—	14	33	16	21						
Andrea & Christoph	9th	—	16	20	36	16							
Andrea & Thomas	10th	—	19	20	39								

Notes

Dance chart

Dancing Stars (season 9) - Dance chart
Couple	Week																
Couple	1	2	3	4	5		6		7		8		9		10		
Marco & Maria	Waltz	Group; Disco	Jive	Foxtrot	Rumba	Group; Country-Western	Tango	Mambo; Marathon	Samba	Team; Jitterbug	Viennese waltz	Cha-cha-cha	Quickstep	Salsa	Paso doble	Viennese waltz	Showdance
Roxanne & Vadim	Group; Disco	Waltz	Paso doble	Quickstep	Rumba	Group; Country-Western	Tango	Mambo; Marathon	Jive	Team; Jitterbug	Cha-cha-cha	Viennese waltz	Foxtrot	Salsa	Samba	Tango	Showdance
Hubert & Kathrin	Waltz	Group; Disco	Rumba	Quickstep	Paso doble	Group; Country-Western	Foxtrot	Mambo; Marathon	Samba	Team; Jitterbug	Viennese waltz	Jive	Tango	Salsa	Cha-cha-cha	Tango	Showdance
Melanie & Danilo	Group; Disco	Cha-cha-cha	Foxtrot	Paso doble	Quickstep	Group; Country-Western	Jive	Mambo; Marathon	Waltz	Team; Jitterbug	Rumba	Viennese waltz	Tango	Salsa			
Lisbeth & Gerhard	Group; Disco	Waltz	Cha-cha-cha	Tango	Samba	Group; Country-Western	Foxtrot	Mambo; Marathon	Paso doble	Team; Jitterbug	Jive	Viennese waltz					
Erik & Lenka	Cha-cha-cha	Group; Disco	Foxtrot	Paso Doble	Waltz	Group; Country-Western	Jive	Mambo; Marathon									
Morteza & Julia	Cha-cha-cha	Group; Disco	Tango	Jive	Foxtrot	Group; Country-Western	Rumba	Mambo; Marathon									
Daniel & Roswitha	Cha-cha-cha	Group; Disco	Waltz	Paso doble	Foxtrot	Group; Country-Western											
Andrea & Christoph	Group; Disco	Cha-cha-cha	Quickstep	Samba													
Andrea & Thomas	Group; Disco	Waltz	Samba														

=== Season 10 ===
Couples

Celebrity	Notability	Professional partner	Status
Thomas May	Radio & television presenter	Lenka Pohoralek	Eliminated 1st
Heidi Neururer	World Championship snowboarder	Andy Pohl	Eliminated 2nd
Fadi Merza	Middleweight kickboxer	Cornelia Kreuter	Eliminated 3rd
Nina Hartmann	Actress & comedian	Paul Lorenz	Eliminated 4th
Gerald Keszler	Life Ball founder	Alexandra Scheriau	Eliminated 5th
Martha Butbul	Singer, musician & businesswoman	Willi Gabalier	Eliminated 6th
Sabine Petzl	Actress & presenter	Thomas Kraml	Eliminated 7th
Georgij Makazaria	Singer & actor	Maria Santner	Third place
Thomas Morgenstern	Olympic ski jumper	Roswitha Wieland	Runners-up
Verena Scheitz	Actress, comedian & presenter	Florian Gschaider	Winners

Scoring chart

Color key:

Winners
Runners-up
Third place
Bottom two
Eliminated

Dancing Stars (season 10) - Weekly scores
Couple	Pl.	Week										
Couple	Pl.	1	2	3	1/2+3	4	5	6	7	8	9	10
Verena & Florian	1st	—	22	31	53	32	31	33+9=42	34+32=66	34+34=68	36+35=71	40+40=80 (Note: This couple finished in first place.)
Thomas & Roswitha	2nd	18	—	20	38	22	23	23+6=29 (Note: This couple was in the bottom two, but was not eliminated.)	26+26=52	29+26=55	27+35=62	30+32=62 (Note: This couple finished in second place.)
Georgij & Maria	3rd	25	—	28	53	27	24	28+10=38	31+32=63	33+31=64	37+34=71	36+38=74 (Note: This couple finished in third place.)
Sabine & Thomas	4th	—	25	28	53	27	28	30+8=38	31+37=68	32+36=68	31+30=61 (Note: This couple was eliminated.)	
Martha & Willi	5th	—	14	10	24	11	10	14+4=18	16+26=42	11+11=22		
Gerald & Alexandra	6th	17	—	23	40	20	22	23+5=28	25+37=62			
Nina & Paul	7th	—	25	27	52	33	27	30+7=37				
Fadi & Cornelia	8th	13	—	15	28	15	17					
Heidi & Andy	9th	—	22	27	49	24						
Thomas & Lenka	10th	17	—	18	35							

Notes

Dance chart

Dancing Stars (season 10) - Dance chart
Couple	Week															
Couple	1	2	3	4	5	6		7		8		9		10		
Georgij & Maria	Waltz	Group; Disco	Jive	Foxtrot	Rumba	Tango	Charleston; Marathon	Samba	Team; Mambo	Quickstep	Paso doble	Cha-cha-cha	Jitterbug	Salsa	Cha-cha-cha	Showdance
Thomas & Roswitha	Cha-cha-cha	Group; Disco	Foxtrot	Samba	Quickstep	Jive	Charleston; Marathon	Tango	Team; Mambo	Waltz	Paso doble	Rumba	Jitterbug	Salsa	Paso doble	Showdance
Verena & Florian	Group; Disco	Cha-cha-cha	Tango	Rumba	Quickstep	Jive	Charleston; Marathon	Waltz	Team; Mambo	Samba	Paso doble	Foxtrot	Jitterbug	Salsa	Tango	
Sabine & Thomas	Group; Disco	Waltz	Cha-cha-cha	Quickstep	Rumba	Tango	Charleston; Marathon	Jive	Team; Mambo	Foxtrot	Paso doble	Samba	Jitterbug			
Martha & Willi	Group; Disco	Waltz	Cha-cha-cha	Foxtrot	Rumba	Quickstep	Charleston; Marathon	Samba	Team; Mambo	Tango	Paso doble					
Gerald & Alexandra	Cha-cha-cha	Group; Disco	Tango	Jive	Waltz	Rumba	Charleston; Marathon	Quickstep	Team; Mambo							
Nina & Paul	Group; Disco	Waltz	Samba	Tango	Cha-cha-cha	Foxtrot	Charleston; Marathon									
Fadi & Cornelia	Waltz	Group; Disco	Rumba	Quickstep	Jive											
Heidi & Andy	Group; Disco	Cha-cha-cha	Quickstep	Samba												
Thomas & Lenka	Cha-cha-cha	Group; Disco	Waltz													

=== Season 11 ===
Couples

Celebrity	Notability	Professional partner	Status
Eser Ari-Akbaba	Weather presenter	Danilo Campisi	Eliminated 1st
Nobert Schneider	Singer	Cornelia Kreuter	Eliminated 2nd
Volker Piesczek	Soccer player & television host	Alexandra Scheriau	Eliminated 3rd
Walter Schachner	Soccer player & manager	Lenka Pohoralek	Eliminated 4th
Monica Weinzettl	Actress	Florian Gschaider	Withdrew
Otto Retzer	Actor & director	Roswitha Wieland	Eliminated 6th
Nicole Hosp	Olympic alpine skier	Willi Gabalier	Eliminated 7th
Riem Higazi	Radio presenter	Dimitar Stefanin	Third place
Ana Milva Gomes	Musical actress	Thomas Kraml	Runners-up
Martin Ferdiny	Musician & television presenter	Maria Santner	Winners

Scoring chart

Color key:

Winners
Runners-up
Third place
Bottom two
Withdrew from competition
Eliminated

Dancing Stars (season 11) - Weekly scores
Couple	Pl.	Week											
Couple	Pl.	1	2	3	1/2+3	4	5	6	7	8	7+8	9	10
Martin & Maria	1st	24	—	28	52	28	34	29+10=39	36	31+36=67	103	35+37=72	38+37=75 (Note: This couple finished in first place.)
Ana Milva & Thomas	2nd	—	30	34	64	32	29	34+9=43	39	40+40=80	119	39+39=78	39+40=79 (Note: This couple finished in second place.)
Riem & Dimitar	3rd	—	22	22	44 (Note: This couple was in the bottom two, but was not eliminated.)	30	22	27+8=35	31	33+34=67	98	37+38=75	36+36=72 (Note: This couple finished in third place.)
Nicole & Willi	4th	—	18	15	33	19	14	22+4=26	16	22+21=43	59	27+29=56 (Note: This couple was eliminated.)	
Otto & Roswitha	5th	12	—	10	22	19	18	21+7=28	15	28+31=59	74		
Monica & Florian	6th	—	25	30	55	19	24	28+6=34	(Note: This couple withdrew from the competition.)				
Walter & Lenka	7th	16	—	20	36	19	25	24+5=29					
Volker & Alexandra	8th	19	—	27	46	18	22						
Norbert & Cornelia	9th	22	—	25	47	29							
Eser & Danilo	10th	—	16	25	41								

Notes

Dance chart

Dancing Stars (season 11) - Dance chart
Couple	Week														
Couple	1	2	3	4	5	6		7	8		9		10		
Martin & Maria	Waltz	Group; Freestyle	Rumba	Quickstep	Jive	Cha-cha-cha	Lindy Hop; Marathon	Foxtrot	Samba	Paso doble	Tango	Disco	Salsa	Contemp.	Showdance
Ana Milva & Thomas	Group; Freestyle	Waltz	Samba	Tango	Cha-cha-cha	Foxtrot	Lindy Hop; Marathon	Rumba	Quickstep	Paso doble	Jive	Disco	Salsa	Contemp.	Showdance
Riem & Dimitar	Group; Freestyle	Waltz	Cha-cha-cha	Foxtrot	Rumba	Tango	Lindy Hop; Marathon	Samba	Quickstep	Paso doble	Jive	Disco	Salsa	Contemp.	
Nicole & Willi	Group; Freestyle	Waltz	Cha-cha-cha	Quickstep	Rumba	Tango	Lindy Hop; Marathon	Jive	Foxtrot	Paso doble	Samba	Disco			
Otto & Roswitha	Waltz	Group; Freestyle	Cha-cha-cha	Foxtrot	Samba	Tango	Lindy Hop; Marathon	Jive	Quickstep	Paso doble					
Monica & Florian	Group; Freestyle	Cha-cha-cha	Tango	Rumba	Quickstep	Jive	Lindy Hop; Marathon								
Walter & Lenka	Cha-cha-cha	Group; Freestyle	Tango	Jive	Waltz	Rumba	Lindy Hop; Marathon								
Volker & Alexandra	Cha-cha-cha	Group; Freestyle	Foxtrot	Samba	Tango										
Norbert & Cornelia	Cha-cha-cha	Group; Freestyle	Waltz	Rumba											
Eser & Danilo	Group; Freestyle	Cha-cha-cha	Quickstep												

=== Season 14 ===
Celebrity	Notability	Professional partner	Status
Niko Niko	Fashion designer	Manuela Stöckl	Eliminated 1st
Margarethe Tiesel	Stage & screen actress	Michael Kaufmann	Eliminated 2nd
Otto Konrad	Soccer player	Lenka Pohoralek	Eliminated 3rd
Boris Bukowski	Musician	Julia Burghardt	Eliminated 4th
Faris Endris Rahoma	Actor & screenwriter	Kati Kallus	Eliminated 5th
Nina Kraft	Television host	Stefan Herzog	Eliminated 6th
Bernhard Kohl	Professional cyclist	Vesela Dimova	Eliminated 7th
Kristina Inhof	Television host	Dimitar Stefanin	Third place
Jasmin Ouschan	World Games nine-ball champion	Florian Gschaider	Runners-up
Caroline Athanasiadis	Cabaret performer	Danilo Campisi	Winners

=== Season 15 ===
Couples

Celebrity	Notability	Professional partner	Status	Ref.
Karina Sarkissova	Ballet dancer	Dimitar Stefanin	Withdrew	
Martina Reuter	Television host	Nikolaus Waltl	Eliminated 1st	
Hannes Kartnig	President of SK Sturm Graz	Catharina Malek	Eliminated 2nd	
Michael Buchinger	Author & cabaret artist	Herbert Stanonik	Eliminated 3rd	
Omar Khir Alanam	Author & slam poet	Kati Kallus	Eliminated 4th	
Lucas Fendrich	Singer	Lenka Pohoralek	Eliminated 5th	
Eveline Eselböck	Chef	Peter Erlbeck	Eliminated 6th	
Lilian Klebow	Actress & singer	Florian Gschaider	Withdrew	
Alexander Pointner	Ski jumping coach	Manuela Stöckl	Third place	
Corinna Kamper	Auto racer	Danilo Campisi	Runners-up	
Missy May	Singer	Dimitar Stefanin	Winners	

Scores chart

Color key:

Winners
Runners-up
Third place
Withdrew from competition
Eliminated

Couple	Pl.	Week									
Couple	Pl.	1	2	3	4	5	6	7	8	9	10
Missy & Stefanin	1st	(Note: Missy May did not enter the competition until Week 2.)									(Note: This couple finished in first place.)
Corinna & Danilo	2nd	22									(Note: This couple finished in second place.)
Alexander & Manuela	3rd	12									(Note: This couple finished in third place.)
Lilian & Florian	4th	22								(Note: This couple withdrew from the competition.)	
Eveline & Peter	5th	17							(Note: This couple was eliminated.)		
Lucas & Lenka	6th	21									
Omar & Kati	7th	11									
Michael & Herbert	8th	15									
Hannes & Catharina	9th	13									
Martina & Nikolaus	10th	13									
Karina & Stefanin	11th	20									

Notes

Dance chart

The couples performed the following each week:

Couple	Week															
Couple	1	2	3	4	5	6		7		8		9		10		
Missy & Stefanin		Rumba	Foxtrot	Paso doble	Waltz	Jive	Dance; Marathon	Freestyle	Team; Argentine tango	Cha-cha-cha	Tango	Viennese waltz	Contemp.	Rumba	Salsa	Showdance
Corinna & Danilo	Rumba	Viennese waltz	Jive	Waltz	Cha-cha-cha	Quickstep	Dance; Marathon	Freestyle	Team; Charleston	Tango	Samba	Foxtrot	Contemp.	Jive	Salsa	Showdance
Alexander & Manuela	Cha-cha-cha	Waltz	Paso doble	Foxtrot	Jive	Tango	Dance; Marathon	Freestyle	Team; Charleston	Samba	Viennese waltz	Quickstep	Contemp.	Cha-cha-cha	Salsa	Showdance
Lilian & Florian	Viennese waltz	Cha-cha-cha	Quickstep	Rumba	Tango	Samba	Dance; Marathon	Freestyle	Team; Charleston	Jive	Waltz					
Eveline & Peter	Tango	Jive	Waltz	Samba	Viennese waltz	Paso doble	Dance; Marathon	Freestyle	Team; Argentine tango	Cha-cha-cha	Foxtrot					
Lucas & Lenka	Foxtrot	Paso doble	Viennese waltz	Jive	Quickstep	Rumba	Dance; Marathon	Freestyle	Team; Argentine tango							
Omar & Kati	Samba	Tango	Rumba	Viennese waltz	Paso doble	Foxtrot	Dance; Marathon									
Michael & Herbert	Paso doble	Foxtrot	Cha-cha-cha	Quickstep												
Hannes & Catharina	Waltz	Samba	Tango													
Martina & Nikolaus	Jive	Quickstep														
Karina & Stefanin	Quickstep															
