= Engstler =

Engstler is a surname. Notable people with the surname include:

- Elisabeth Engstler (born 1960), Austrian television presenter
- Emily Engstler (born 2000), American basketball player
- Franz Engstler (born 1961) German racing driver
- Luca Engstler (born 2000), German racing driver

== See also ==
- Engstler Motorsport, German auto racing team
- Paul Okon-Engstler (born 2005), Australian soccer player
