= Leo Aberer =

Austrian pop singer

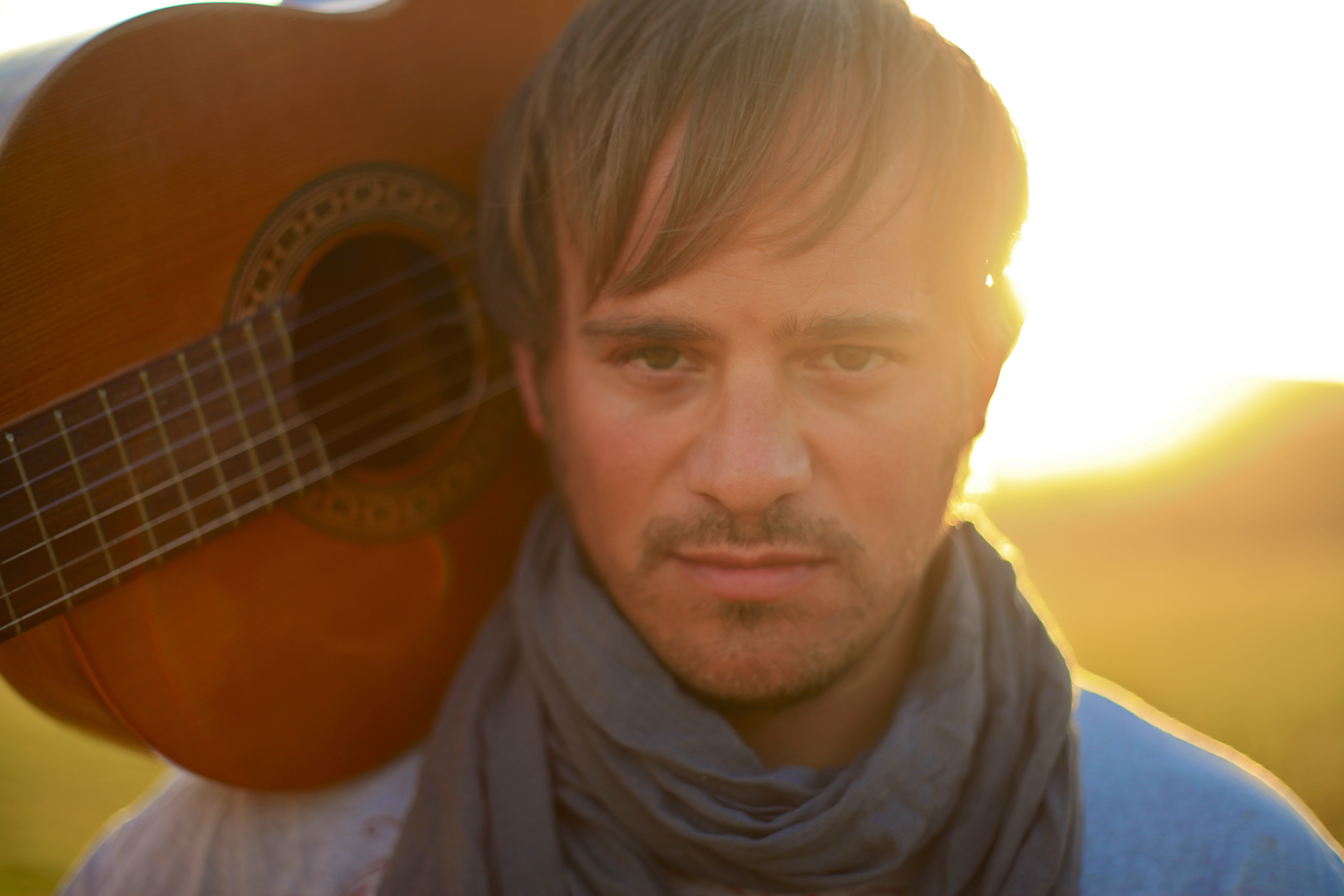
- Leo Aberer

Background information
- Also known as: LeeOne.com, Leo
- Born: March 27, 1978 (age 48)
- Origin: Vienna, Austria
- Genres: Pop, blues, reggae, swing, hip hop, rock, alternative rock
- Occupations: Singer-songwriter, musician
- Instruments: Vocals, guitar, violin, synthesizer
- Years active: 1999–present
- Website: leoaberer.eu

Leo Aberer (born in Vienna on March 27, 1978), also "Leo" or "Leeone", is an Austrian pop singer. He became famous through his participation in the Ö3 soundcheck during the year 2005, the ORF-Show The Match and the preliminary decision of Eurovision Song Contest 2011 with Patricia Kaiser.

== Education ==
Leo Aberer has received violin lessons since he was seven years old at the Vienna Konservatorium. Moreover, he plays guitar and keyboard after he had taught it himself. During the following years he studied jazz at Karl-Franzens-Universität in Graz. At the same time he studied Business Administration and Psychology.

== Biography ==
In 2003 he recorded his first album and also his debut single called "Sterne" (German for "stars"). Both allowed him the entrance into the Austrian charts with position 69 (album) and 21 for his first single. When participating in the Ö3 soundcheck 2005, he reached the second place and received a new record deal at Universal Music. Together with his band he tours through Austria since 2006. During the same year his single "Won't you know" was part of the Austrian charts for more than 20 weeks. Later he published songs such as "Walking and Talking". In 2007 Leo Aberer was nominated for Amadeus Austrian Music Award.

As part of the initiative Die Neuen Österreicher Leo Aberer recorded the single "Kinder" (German for "children") in November 2007 together with other musicians. Their whole benefit was donated to an Austrian charity project called Licht ins Dunkel.

In 2013 he entered a new part of music business with opening his own music label "Black Baracuda" and publishing house "Leoversum" in Austria.

Leo Aberer's video for the song "Sweet honey" reached no 14 on the international YouTube -charts on March 26, 2008. In 2010, he reinterpreted it together with Laith al Deen. After he had recorded his longplayer "Sackgasse" he left Austria and went to Los Angeles. There, he started working with rapper LL Cool J and recorded his new album.

In 2010 his album "Wann geda?" was published and made up the first charts entry for Leo Aberer for years. During the same year Leo Aberer published the song "I wanna be free".

In fall of the year 2010 he won the public vote for the Austrian preliminary decision to the Eurovision Song Contest 2011, together with Patricia Kaiser and the song "There Will Never Be Another You". "There will Never be Another You" became No 1 in the charts some days later.

In May 2012 Aberer travelled to New York City and Budapest where he produced the song "Football is my life" in collaboration with Shaggy. It became the official song for European championships in 2012 Moreover, he recorded the song "Giovanna" which entered the charts immediately (No 5 during the year 2013)

In May 2014 he got the "Erzherzog-Johann-Award" which is related to the charity project "Band für Steiermark”

Another cooperation with Shaggy took place during the World Championships in the year 2014 with the song "Football Minha Vida"..

Last but not least he started a new project in November 2014. In collaboration with Marco Angelini he recorded the song "Goodbye" which conducts the iTunes Charts since its publication. "Goodbye" reached chart position No. 9 and was part of the official Austrian Charts for weeks.

2018/2019 Leo Aberer visited Africa. He appeared at numerous shows at CNN, Ten over 10, Citizen, Kenya Broadcasting Corporation, K24, Arena 254, Trend, Ktn, Mseto and became famous as "PAPA LEO".

2022 June 12 Leo Aberer and his musicians were one of the acts at the Nova Rock#2022 festival in Nickelsdorf(Burgenland/Austria) on the Red Bull Music Stage.

The song "Oh Lord", released in May 2023, is the 23rd music track by Leo Aberer, which has reached to get into the playlist at Ö3.

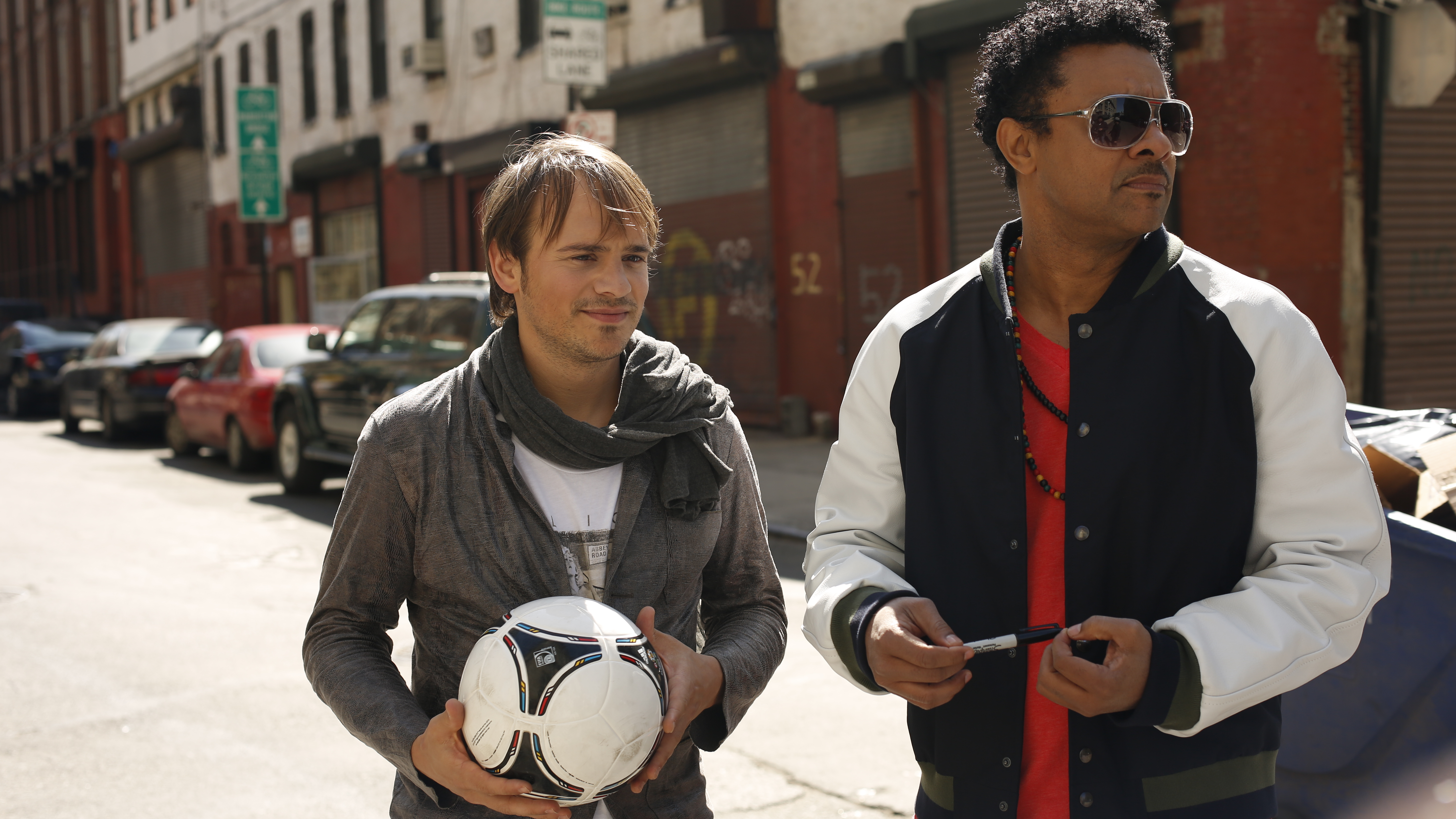
Aberer with Shaggy

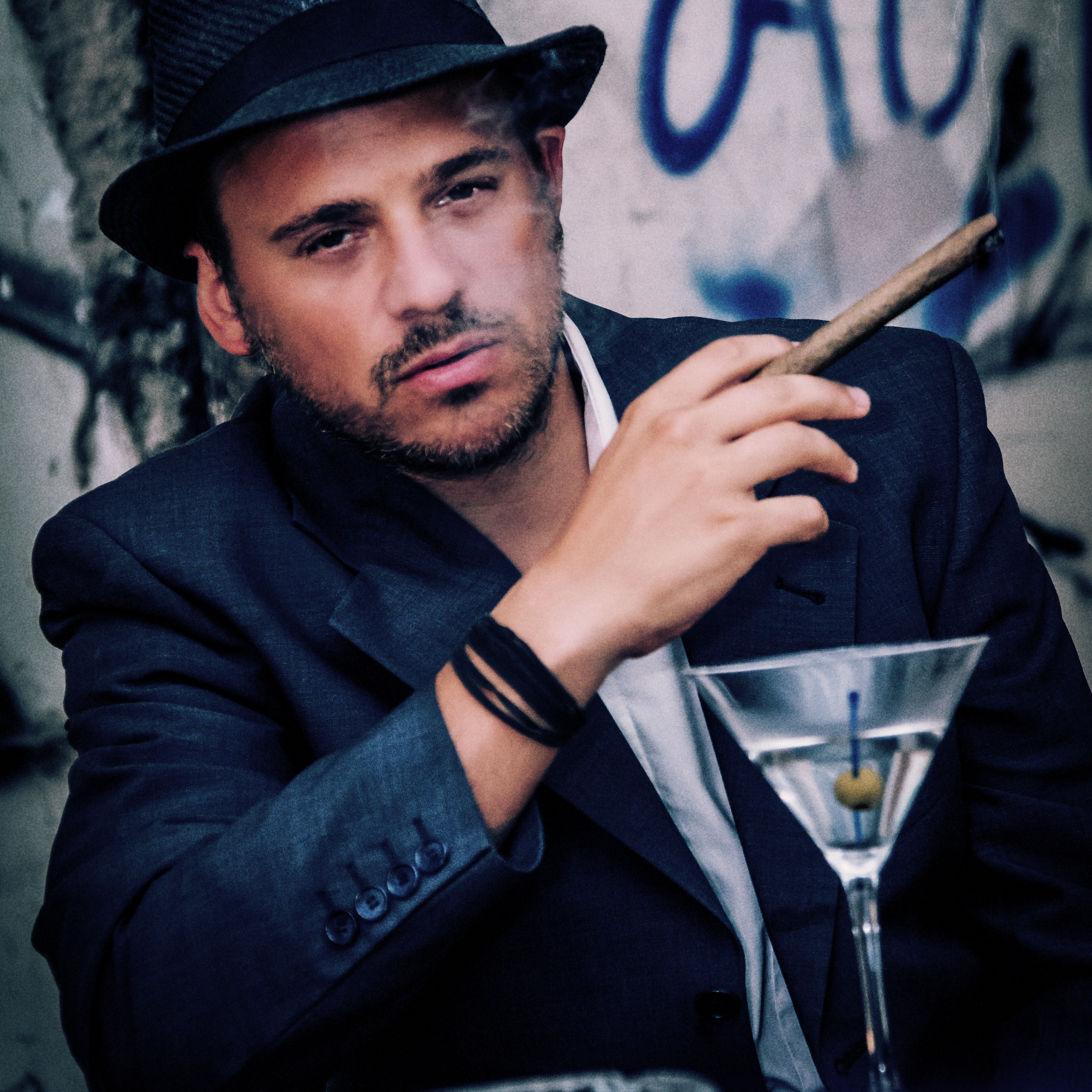
Leo Aberer

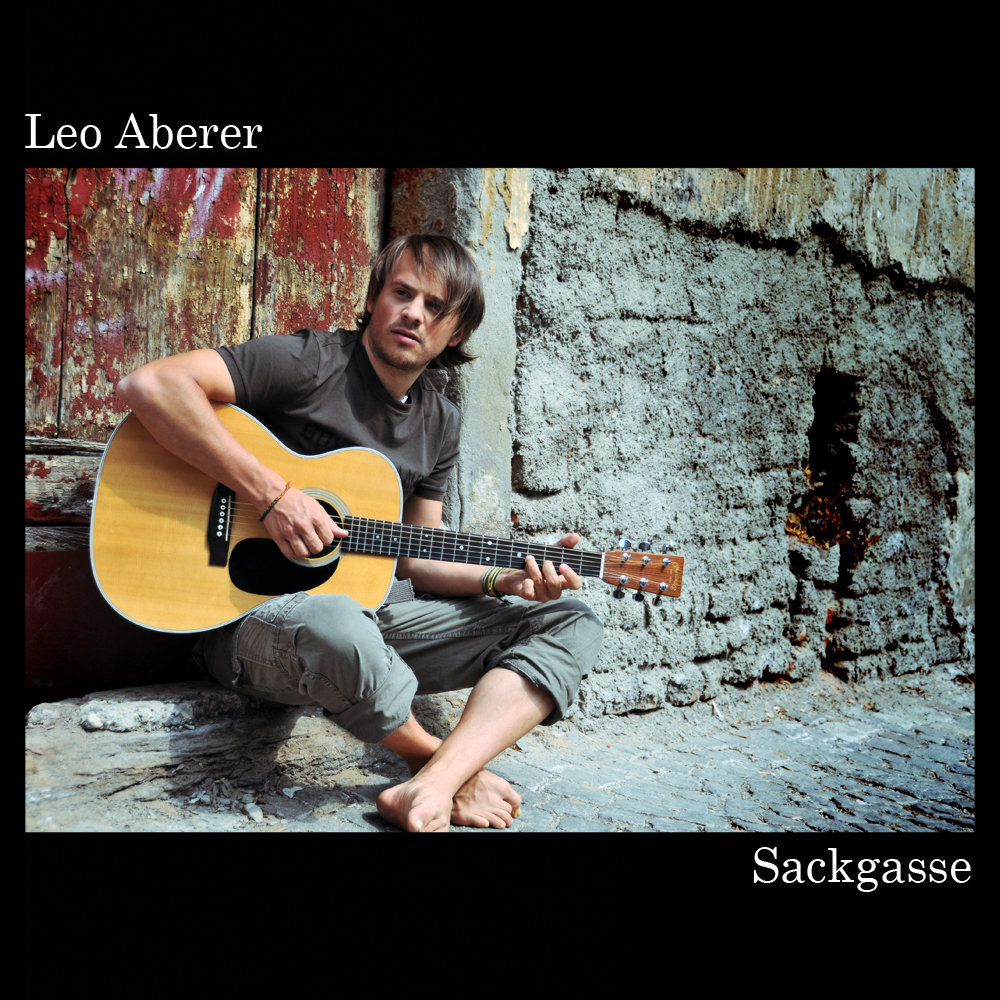
"Sackgasse"

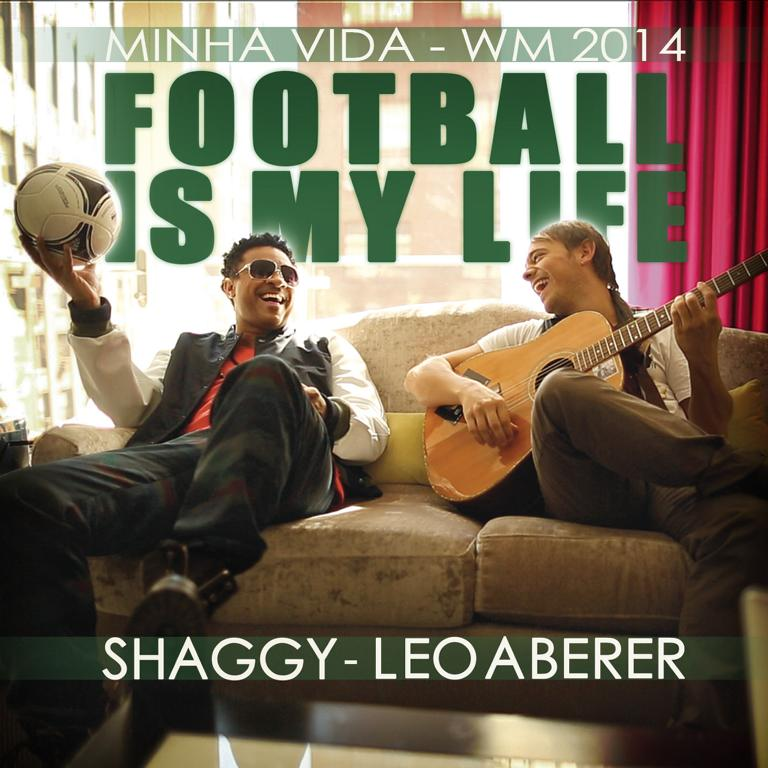
Minha Vida – World Championship 2014

== Discography ==
=== Albums ===
Year	Album	Peak positions	Certification
Year	Album	AUT	Certification
2006	Sterne (as Leo)	69	
2007	Spielball (as Leo)	–	
2009	Sackgasse (as Leo Aberer)	–	
2010	Wann geda? (as Leo Aberer)	46	
2013	Ego State L1114 (as Leo Aberer)	–	
2022	Playground (as Leo Aberer)	–	
2024	Einzigartig Best of Reggae (as Leo Aberer)	–	
2025	Bleib geschmeidig	-	
2026	Nachspielzeit	-	

Others

- 2002: Walking and Talking (independent release)
- 2003: Sterne (independent release)

=== Song releases ===
Title	Credited as	Year	Other credited
Back in Time	Leoone	1999	
Sterne	Leo	2003	
Won't You Know	Leo Aberer	2006	
Baby ist das Liebe	Leo Aberer	2006	Bravo Hits 55
Walking and Talking	Leo Aberer	2006	
Dancing	Leo Aberer	2007	
Rollin	Inez & Leo Aberer	2007	
Sweet Honey	Leo Aberer	2008; 2010	featuring Laith Al-Deen & Johnny Palmer
What About the Rain	Leo Aberer	2009	
Wanna Be Happy	Leo Aberer	2009	
Sturm und Drang	Leo Aberer	2009	
Swing Low	Leo Aberer	2009	feat. / Lia, the Fairy and 3 Angels
Football Is My Life	Leo Aberer	2010	featuring Herbert Prohaska
Run	Leo Aberer	2010	
Wann geda?	Leo Aberer	2010	Ö3 Greatest Hits Compilation 53 – 1st place of the iTunes Reggae Charts
The Snow Is Back Again	Leo Aberer	2010	
Heisse Maroni	Leo Aberer	2010	
I hob die liab	Leo Aberer	2010	
I Wanna Be Free	Leo Aberer	2010	
There Will Never Be Another You	Leo Aberer	2011	together with Patricia Kaiser
Deine Blinkerl	Leo Aberer	2011	
Fade Away	Leo Aberer	2012	
Football Is My Life	Leo Aberer & Shaggy	2012	
Dark Clouds Falling	Leo Aberer & Friends	2012	
Never Ever	Leo Aberer	2012	feat. Simone Kopmajer
Auf die Schi	Leo Aberer	2013	
Schi fahren Is My Life	Leo Aberer	2013	
So Low	Leo Aberer	2013	
Es tut so weh	Leo Aberer	2013	
Giovanna	Leo Aberer	2013	
Tanz	Leo Aberer	2014	
Football Minha Vida	Leo Aberer & Shaggy	2014	
Oesterreicher	Leo Aberer	2014	
Kangaroo	Leo Aberer	2014	
Goodbye	Marco Angelini & Leo Aberer	2014	
Omis Apfelstrudel	Leo Aberer	2014	
Never Meant to Hurt You	Leo Aberer	2015	
So Slow	Leo Aberer	2015	
Everything Is Possible	Leo Aberer	2015	
Please Don't Go	Leo Aberer	2015	
One More Night	Leo Aberer	2016	
I EM Austria	Leo Aberer	2016	feat. Frenkie Schinkels
Loco	Leo Aberer	2016	feat. Balleo
Lola	Leo Aberer	2016	
We Jump Down Deep	Leo Aberer	2016	feat. Österreichischer Skiverband-Adler
Follow	Leo Aberer	2017	
Don't Drink Coffee	Leo Aberer	2017	
Spring in die Sonne	Leo Aberer	2017	
Over Now	Nora Lisa	2017	feat. Leo Aberer
Hot Summerrain	Angelika Doss	2017	feat. Leo Aberer
Don't Give Up	Leo Aberer	2017	feat. Kim Lone, Theresa Chorinsky, Angelika Doss
The wolf	Leo Aberer	2017	
Hole in my soul	Leo Aberer	2018	
Cucucina	Leo Aberer	2018	
Sorry	Leo Aberer	2018	feat. Fritz Jerey
Mamacita	Leo Aberer	2018	feat. Seroney
Over my shoulder	Leo Aberer	2018	feat. Seroney
Put your hands up	Leo Aberer	2019	feat. Seroney
1/Eins/Wir sind eins	David Potho	2019	feat. Leo Aberer
Sitting by the Fire	Leo Aberer	2019	
Mein Zuhause	Corinne Casey	2019	feat. Leo Aberer
Superheld	Leo Aberer	2020	
Straciatella	Leo Aberer	2020	
Night and Day	Leo Aberer & / Lia	2020	
Give a little	Leo Aberer	2021	
Hello	Leo Aberer	2021	
Loslassen	Leo Aberer	2022	
Mann Mann	Leo Aberer	2022	
I'm Scared	Conny Poell & Leo Aberer	2022	
Cantar	Leo Aberer & Silvio Gabriel	2022	
Four Seasons	Conny Poell feat. Leo Aberer	2022	
Winter Wonderland	Musikschule Vasoldsberg & Leo Aberer	2022	Vasoldsberger Weihnachtsgrüße
Auf die Schi	Marco Wagner & Matty Valentino	2023	
Oh Lord	Leo Aberer	2023	
No Tengo Dinero	Daniela de Lima & Leo Aberer	2023	
Planeten	Leo Aberer	2023	
Mit Juchitzer und Jodler	Leo Aberer	2024	
Stadionrausch	Leo Aberer feat. KI	2024	
Wir haben gewonnen	Chip & Dale X Leo Aberer	2024	
We are one	Leo Aberer(feat. Virginia Ernst, Natalie Holzner, Allessa, Marco Angelini, Georgij Makazaria, Lizz Görgl, Farbklexx, Martina Kaiser & Freigeist)	2024	
Saturday Night Jodel	Leo Aberer feat. Betty O.	2025	
Papagei	Leo Aberer	2025	
Cafétscherl	Leo Aberer	2025	
Where are the days	Leo Aberer	2025	
Weihnachtsfeier	Leo Aberer	2025	
One Big Crowd	Alpenlydia x Leo Aberer	2026	
Holzhacker	Leo Aberer	2026	
Sing olé	Leo Aberer feat. Frenkie Schinkels	2026	
King Of The Ring	Fadi Merza feat. Leo Aberer	2026	
El Cuarto de Tula	Leo Aberer feat. Silvio Gabriel	2026	
