= Arnim Tölke =

German painter

Arnim Tölke (born 1963) is a German contemporary painter.

Arnim Tölke was born in Göttingen. He is a former masters student of Markus Lüpertz. He is a member of the painter group D.A.R.M.

As a painter he often deals with masculine issues, for instance, work that incorporates macho and military imagery.

He has traveled extensively to warzones for inspiration, the most notable of which being Uganda where he had first-hand experiences with the Civil War against the Lord's Resistance Army.

Since 1999 he has been teaching life-drawing at the Kunstakademie Düsseldorf, being an essential component of introduction into the academy life along with his colleague and former classmate Udo Dziersk. Tölke also came to attention for giving private life-drawing classes to ex-pornstar Dolly Buster.
