= Kristina Inhof =

Austrian television presenter (born 1988)

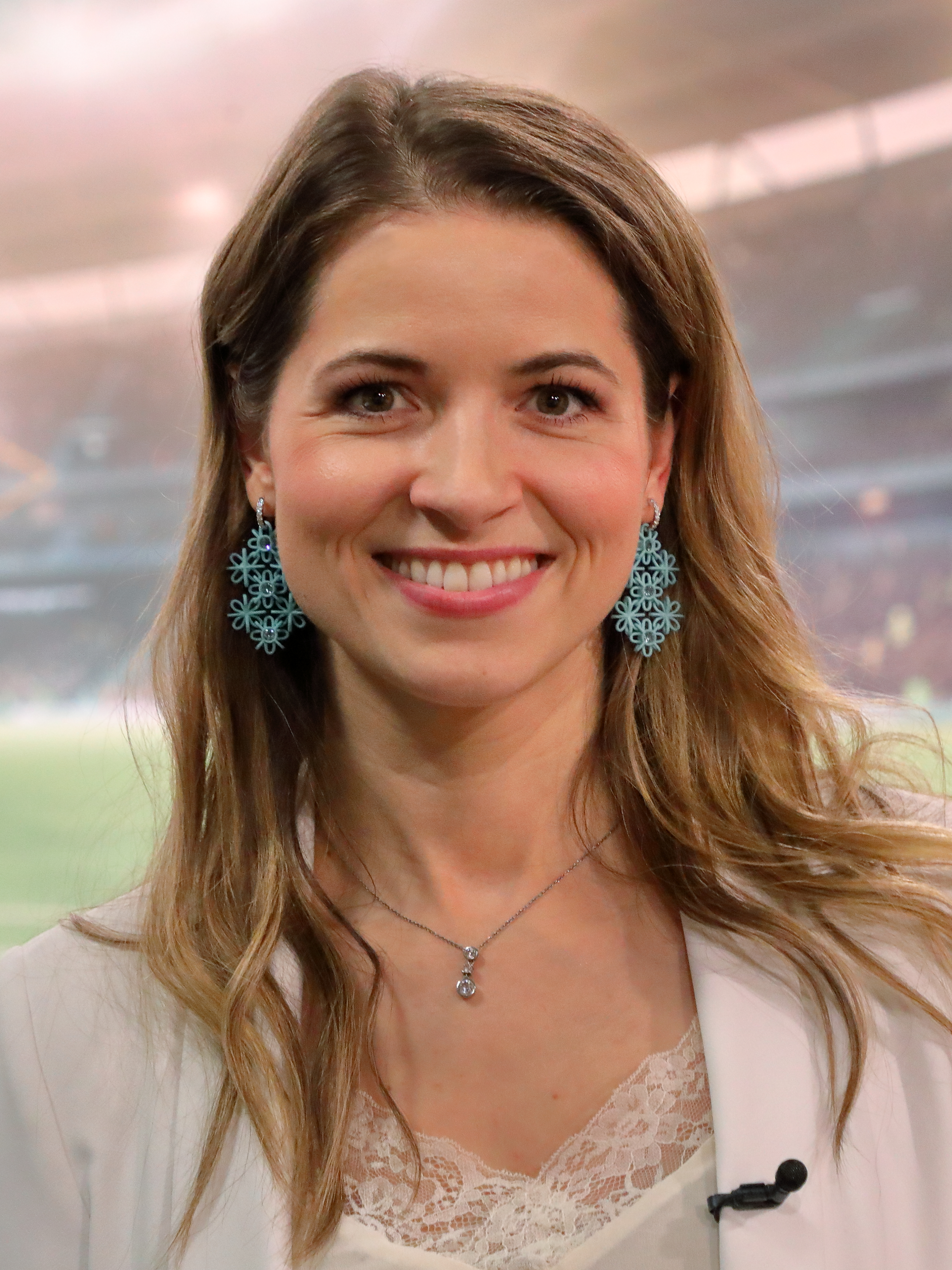
- Inhof in 2025
- Born: 1 October 1988 (age 37); Vienna, Austria
- Occupation: Television presenter
- Years active: 2009–present
- Website: kristinainhof.at

Kristina Inhof (born 1 October 1988) is an Austrian television presenter and sports journalist at ORF.

== Early life ==
Inhof was born in Vienna and grew up in Lower Austria. During her school years she played handball for several years at Hypo Niederösterreich. In 2008 she completed her school leaving exam at the Vienna Business School. Shortly thereafter, she began her studies in sports science with a focus on sport management at the University of Vienna. During this time, she also lived for six months in Gran Canaria, where she completed a semester abroad at the University of Las Palmas de Gran Canaria (ULPGC). Already during her studies she completed various internships at media companies such as Radio 88.6, Kronen Zeitung or Austria 9. In October 2012 Inhof completed her studies with a bachelor's degree. She is also a graduate of the WIFI Media Academy.

== Career ==
In 2009, Inhof was in front of a camera for the first time. She spent almost two years as a reporter at Vienna Online, and then moved to W24, where she first presented Guten Morgen Wien and from 2012 onward was the face of the daily live show Guten Abend Wien. In addition to her work at W24, in 2012 she was hired by the Austrian TV broadcaster Puls 4 for the broadcast of the UEFA Champions League. This moderated them together with Christian Nehiba and Frank Schinkels.

At W24, Inhof also took over the format Immobilien für Wien, the main evening show Best of and the moderation of the programme presentations of the station.

For several months in 2015, she joined the moderator team of Sky Sport News HD and presented the sports news several times a week. At the same time, Inhof moderated together with Andi Knoll on Die große Chance der Chöre in ORF eins.

In 2016, Inhof worked exclusively for the ORF, where she presented the football department, which includes programmes from the Champions League, Bundesliga, Austrian Football First League, Austrian Cup and summaries of games of the Austria national football team. She was also part of the ORF team at the UEFA Euro 2016 in France. In addition, she presented again in 2016 with Andi Knoll on Die große Chance der Chöre. In 2017, Inhof announced points in the finals of the Eurovision Song Contest Austria, replacing Katharina Bellowitsch as the point leader.

In addition to her TV appearances, Inhof is active as an event presenter. In 2013 and 2014, she hosted the final of the EHF Champions League in the Lanxess Arena. Apart from the sporting area, she also leads through galas and corporate events.

== Personal life ==
Inhof lives in Lower Austria.

She is in a relationship with Georg Lauscha (born 1987). In April 2024 they became parents to a daughter. The two got married in 2025.

Inhof is a fan of the London football club Arsenal F.C. and has been to the Emirates Stadium several times.

She speaks German as well as English and Spanish fluently.
