= Die große Chance =

Austrian talent television show

- Presented by: Peter Rapp; Thomas Klock; Elisabeth Engstler
- Country of origin: Austria

Original release
- Network: Österreichischer Rundfunk
- Release: 1980 – 1990
- Network: ORF 1
- Release: 2011 – present

Die große Chance ("The Big Chance") is an Austrian talent television show, originally aired between 1980 and 1990, then revived in a competitive format from 2011 to 2014. The program's spin-offs included Die große Comedy Chance ("The Great Comedy Chance") (2012–2014) and Die große Chance der Chöre ("The Great Chance of Choirs") (2015–2016). In 2024, the show returns under the motto "Let’s sing and dance".

The Uptown Monotones, an Austrian experimental/fusion band that formed in Graz in 1993, became known to a wider audience through Die große Chance.

== Background ==
Die große Chance was originally broadcast by the Österreichischer Rundfunk (Austrian Broadcasting Corporation) showing on prime time between 1980 and 1990. Peter Rapp hosted the show from 1980 to 1987, Thomas Klock took over in 1988 and Elisabeth Engstler in 1989 and 1990. The programme was discontinued in 1991.

== 2011-present: Revival ==
Die große Chance was revived as a competitive talent show starting 2011. It was broadcast on Austrian television ORF eins.

The first season broadcast between 9 September and 11 November 2011 was won by singer Christine Hödl in 2011, with Valerian Kapeller as runner-up and Magic Acrobatics third. It was hosted by Andi Knoll. Notably, the 2014 Eurovision Song Contest eventual winner, Conchita Wurst, came sixth in the 2011 series.

The second season was broadcast from 7 September to 2 November 2012 and was won by dancing duo Alexandra und Esprit (Alexandra Plank and her Border Collie named Esprit), with the music band Solid Tube as runner-up and cabaret act Flo und Wisch third. Andi Knoll and Doris Golpashin hosted the programme for a second season.

The third season aired in 2013. The hosts were Andi Knoll and Alice Tumler, and the jury consisted of Karina Sarkissova, Zabine, Petter Rapp, and Sido. The finale took place in September, and the grand prize of €100,000 was won by singer Thomas David.

The fourth season in 2014 was hosted by Alice Tumler and was won by vocals and harp act Harfonie, with singer/ steirische harmonika player Petra Mayer as runner-up and singer Ivana Cibulova third.

The new season of the show, titled Die große Chance – Let’s sing and dance, premiered on March 8, 2024. Magicians or dog trainers were not allowed this time. The hosts were Fanny Stapf and Andi Knoll. In the first episode, the jury included Missy May, Barbara Meier, and Thorsteinn Einarsson, although the jury lineup changed throughout the season. The prize pool was €50,000. The finale took place in May, and the season was won by the dance group of 58 members, Indeed Unique.

== Die große Comedy Chance ==
Another offshoot of the programme was Die große Comedy Chance for giving a chance for comedians to perform. The first series was broadcast in 2012, also hosted by Andi Knoll and won by Zwa Voitrottln with a second season in 2014 won by Olivier Sanrey.

== Die große Chance der Chöre ==
In 2015, a spin-off titled Die große Chance der Chöre was broadcast. The jury comprised Oliver Pocher, Larissa Marolt, Ramesh Nair, and Birgit Sarata. The show was hosted by Andi Knoll and Kristina Inhof, with a prize of €25 000 for the first place. The winners were the eight-member ensemble Piccanto, followed by the children’s choir Calypso in second place, and the BORG Gastein gymnasium student choir in third place.

In 2016, the show was again hosted by Andi Knoll and Kristina Inhof. The jury for the second season included Ramesh Nair, Oliver Pocher, Dorretta Carter, and Fräulein Mai. The winners were Sängerrunde Pöllau, they won the prize of €50 000. The top three also included VOK and Gumpoldskirchner Spatzen.
