= Marco Angelini =

Austrian singer and songwriter

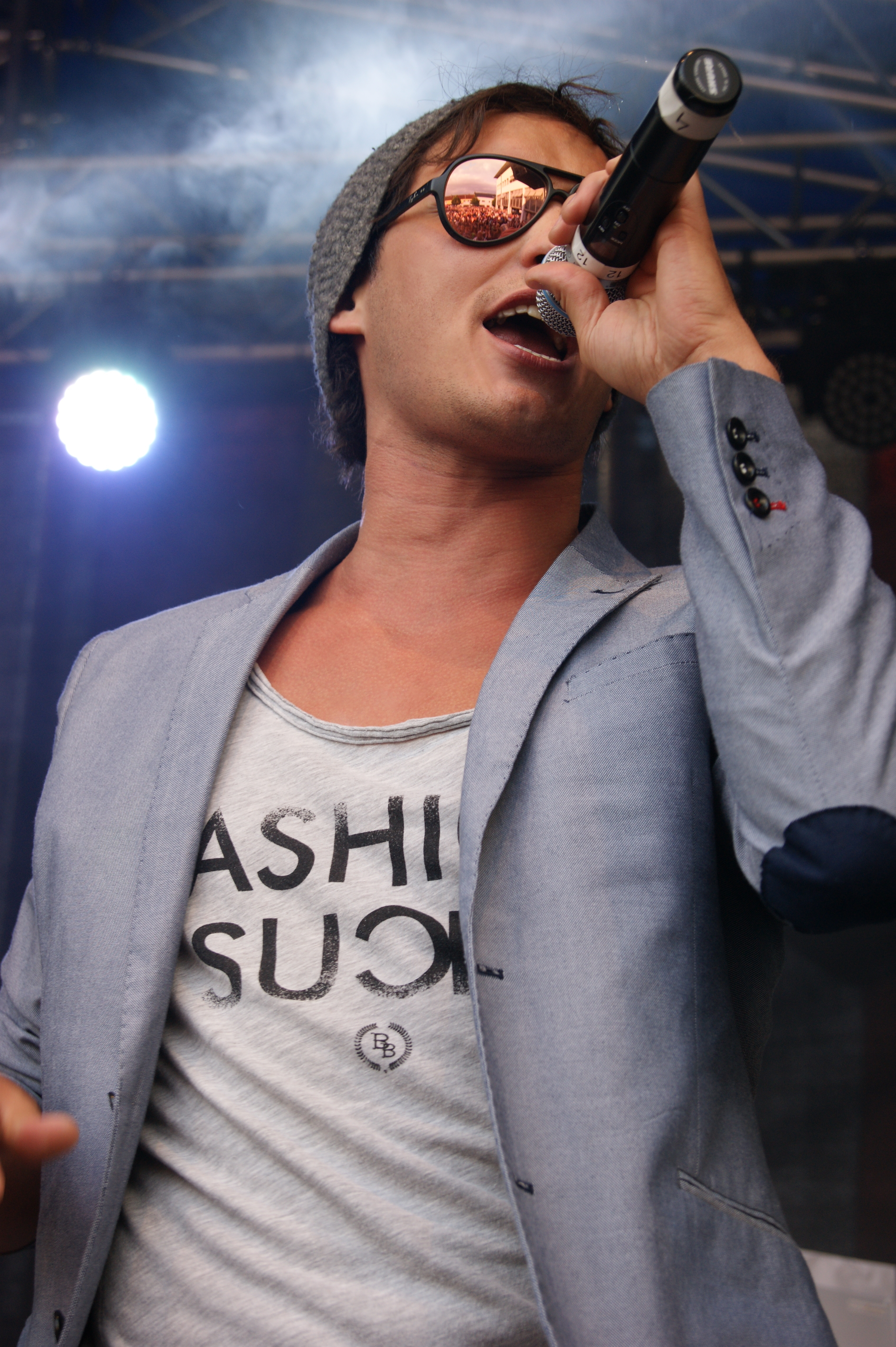
- Angelini at Marchtrenk 2014

Background information
- Born: Marco Angelini; 26 July 1984 (age 41); Voitsberg, Steiermark, Austria
- Genres: Pop rock, soft rock, dance, Austropop
- Occupations: Singer-songwriter, musician, doctor
- Instruments: Vocals, guitar
- Years active: 2008–2014

Marco Angelini (26 July 1984) is an Austrian singer and songwriter who withdrew from public life in 2014 and started working as a doctor. Marco Angelini was born in Voitsburg, Styria, Austria, to an Austrian mother and a Luxembourgish father. He has been in a relationship with dancer Maria Santner since 2014.

== Musical career ==
Angelini has participated in various talent shows, like Helden Von Morgen, Starmania, and X Factor. By participating in season 8 of Deutschland sucht den Superstar – the German equivalent of American Idol – he reached 4th place.

In 2011, Angelini signed a recording contract with Sony Music – Austria, where his first single "Leuchtturm", which was produced by Alexander Kahr, was recorded and released in December 2011.

After moving to 2DayRecords the Maxi – CD called "Du & Ich" was published on 25 January 2013. "Du & Ich" entered the Austrian Charts at No. 69.

His second single – produced again in cooperation with 2DayRecords – called "Mein Engel (hier auf Erden)" has reached No. 84 in the charts. It was published on 31 May 2013.

On 4 October 2013, his third single called "Wunder gibt es immer wieder" was released and reached No. 62 in the German charts.

After his participation in "Ich bin ein Star – Holt mich hier raus!" he published a party song called "Heute Nacht", which reached No. 54 in the German charts, and No. 51 in the Austrian charts.

He published a song called "Goodbye" in cooperation with Leo Aberer. They also produced a Christmas song that joined the Austrian charts at No. 23 in the first week and peaked at No. 9.

=== Temporary break ===
At the end of July 2014, Angelini announced a break in his career as a singer and performed his last live show on 13 September 2014, wanting to continue his work as a doctor and focus on his private life, while still intending to work as a singer again in the future.

== Discography ==
=== Albums ===
- 2013: Best Of

=== Singles and releases ===
- 2011: Leuchtturm
- 2013: Du & ich
- 2013: Mein Engel (hier auf Erden)
- 2013: Wunder gibt es immer wieder
- 2014: Heute Nacht
- 2014: Suzie
- 2014: Goodbye – Marco Angelini & Leo Aberer

== Awards ==
- Cool Music Award 2011 (music magazine Cool)
- Cool Music Award 2012 (music magazine Cool)
- Badge of honour in silver of his hometown Voitsberg 2011
- Sexiest Austrian Celebrity alive 2011
- Best Singer 2011 (youth magazine Xpress)
- Best Newcomer 2011 (youth magazine Xpress)
- Best Austrian Star 2011 (youth magazine Xpress)
- Best Austrian Star 2012 (youth magazine Xpress)

== Literature ==
- Claudia Fuerbach: Marco Angelini: Das große Fanbuch. Roed Verlag, ISBN 978-3-945489-02-4, published 30 November 2013.
- Claudia Fuerbach: Marco Angelini: Live on Stage!. Roed Verlag, ISBN 978-3-945489-14-7, published 20 December 2014.
