= Volker Piesczek =

Austrian television presenter

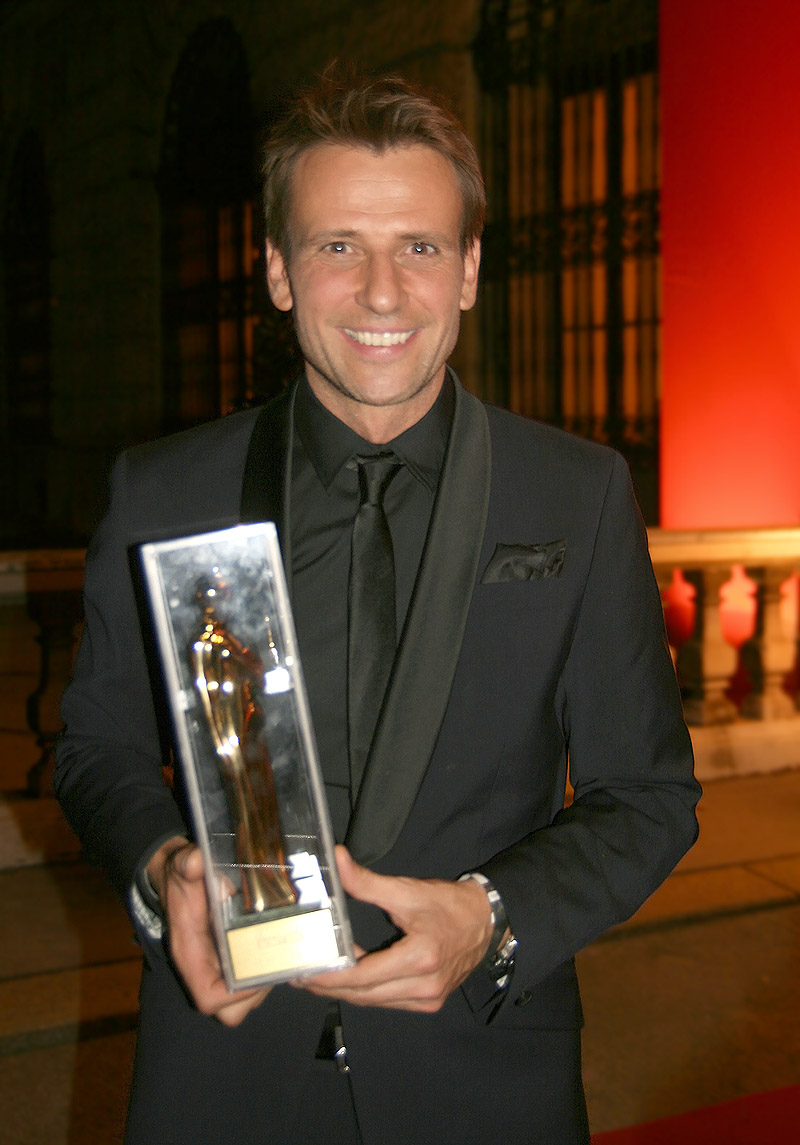
Piesczek in 2012

Volker Piesczek (born 14 May 1969) is an Austrian television presenter and former footballer.

== Career as a football player ==
Before his career in television, Piesczek was a professional footballer with FC Tulln (92/93 and 00/01), SVStockerau (93/94), SKN St. Pölten (95/96) and VfB Mödling (96/97). In the 94/95 season, he played in the Austrian Bundesliga for Wiener Sportclub. In his entire professional football career, he made three appearances in the UI Cup and seven appearances each in the Regionalliga Ost and the ÖFB Cup. He also played 58 times in the 2nd division and 28 times in the Bundesliga.

== Career as a presenter ==
Piesczek studied journalism and political science alongside his football career. For ATV, he worked for seven years as a football presenter. Before that, he worked for Sat.1 and DSF Plus or in the Austrian and German Bundesliga as a football presenter. For ORF 2, he worked as a news reporter and in 2000 he presented the island show Expedition Robinson for ORF 1 and RTL II. In 2004, he switched to Puls TV and ProSieben Austria, where he alternated with Helmut Brandstätter to present Austria Top News.

Piesczek took part in the ORF football show Das Match during the 2008 European FootballChampionship in Austria and Switzerland. From 2010 to 2013, he presented ATV Life on ATV. In 2011 and 2012, he was awarded the Austrian Film and Television Award Romy in the category Most Popular Presenter – Entertainment. In 2011, he placed second in the Sports category of the Austrian Journalist of the Year awards.

From March 2017 to April 2017, he was a celebrity contestant on the ORF dance show Dancing Stars. In 2018, he commented on matches of the Football World Cup in Russia on OE24.

== Personal life ==
Piesczek was born in Klosterneuburg.

In 2003, he made a guest appearance in the television series Kommissar Rex (episode: "Berühmt um jeden Preis").

Since June 2005, Piesczek has been married to former Austrian politician Eva Glawischnig.
