= Cathy Zimmermann =

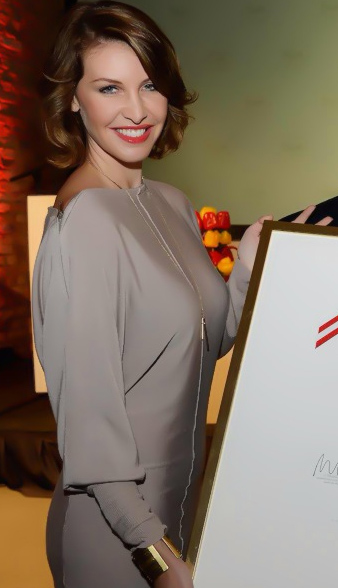
- Born: Cathrin-Theres Zimmermann; October 6, 1981 (age 44); Vienna, Austria

Austrian television host Cathy Zimmermann (originally Cathrin-Theres Zimmermann) was born on October 6, 1981, in Vienna, Austria.

== Life and career ==
Zimmermann studied at the Vienna University of Economics and Business, before completing her degree at the Dolmetschinstitut Wien. While she was working towards her degree, she also studied dance for six years at the Prayner Konservatorium.

She received her first television experience as a weather presenter in October 2005 at the private television station ATV. In 2007, Zimmermann was nominated at the Austrian Romy award as 'Shooting Star of the Year.'

Apart from her work as a television host, Zimmermann also hosted the morning radio show at Radio Energy 104.2 and worked as a model.

In April 2009 she changed to the Austrian national public service broadcaster ORF, where she got headhunted while an ATV program presentation. After many castings she enforced and got the job as host at the regional show "Niederösterreich heute".

On February 7, 2011, the news came out, that Zimmermann will be a part of the 6th season of Dancing Stars. She came into the 7th round, where she got eliminated.

In July 2011, Cathy Zimmermann announced, that she will leave the ORF Niederösterreich at the end of the year. The reason for that decision was her mother, who had almost died because of an ileus. In the future, Zimmermann wants to devote her time more to enter- and infotainment, as the news but she still want to host some shows.

Since 2012 she volunteers in an Austrian hospice as a carer for terminally ill people once a week and is part of school projects in which she talks about hospices and loss experiences with kids and teenagers. For her engagement she received a medal of honor in gold from the "Albert Schweitzer Gesellschaft".

She will play the leading role "Jane" in the upcoming apocalyptic webtv series "after hell" which is an Austrian, English and American production including the two American actors Dirk Benedict and Richard Hatch.

== Private life ==
Zimmermann was born in Vienna and is an only child. She was in a relationship with the ZiB 20 host Roman Rafreider.
