= Marika Lichter =

Austrian singer and actress

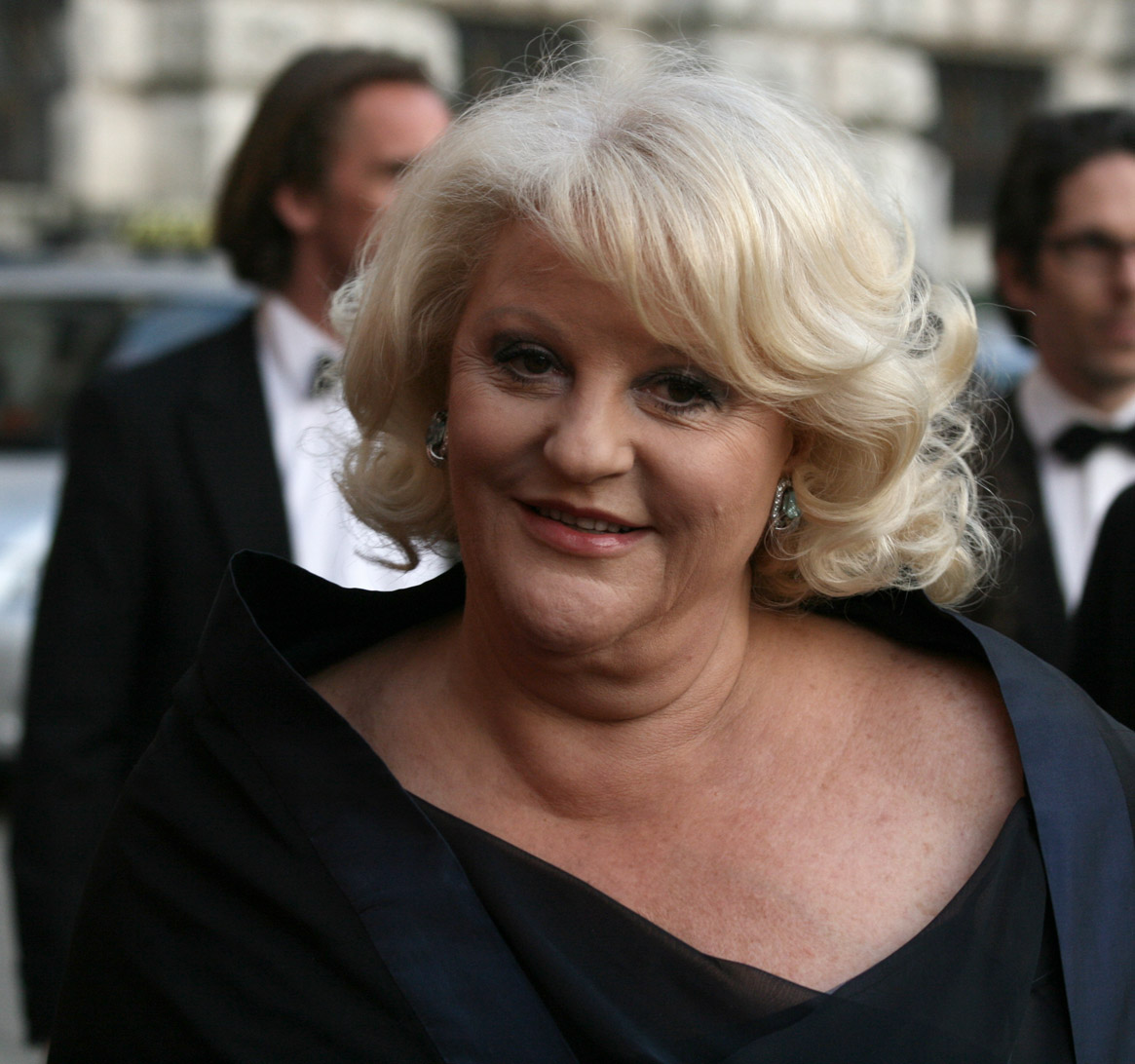
Marika Lichter in 2011

Marika Lichter (Vienna, 24 October 1949) is an Austrian singer and actress who was popular as a pop singer in the early 1970s, before moving into musicals and acting. Her career experienced a revival from 2006 with Dancing Stars.

== Discography ==
Singles

- "Adieu" (1969)
- Ich hab einem Kummer (1970)
- Wieder / Tu nicht so (1970)
- Ungeküßt / Männer sind so
- Dann wird es wieder schön sein / Allein
- CD Musik ist Trumpf (2006) nur 3 Titel: Musik ist Trumpf / Spiel noch einmal für mich, Habannero / Tipipipitipso
