= Barbara Karlich =

Austrian television presenter

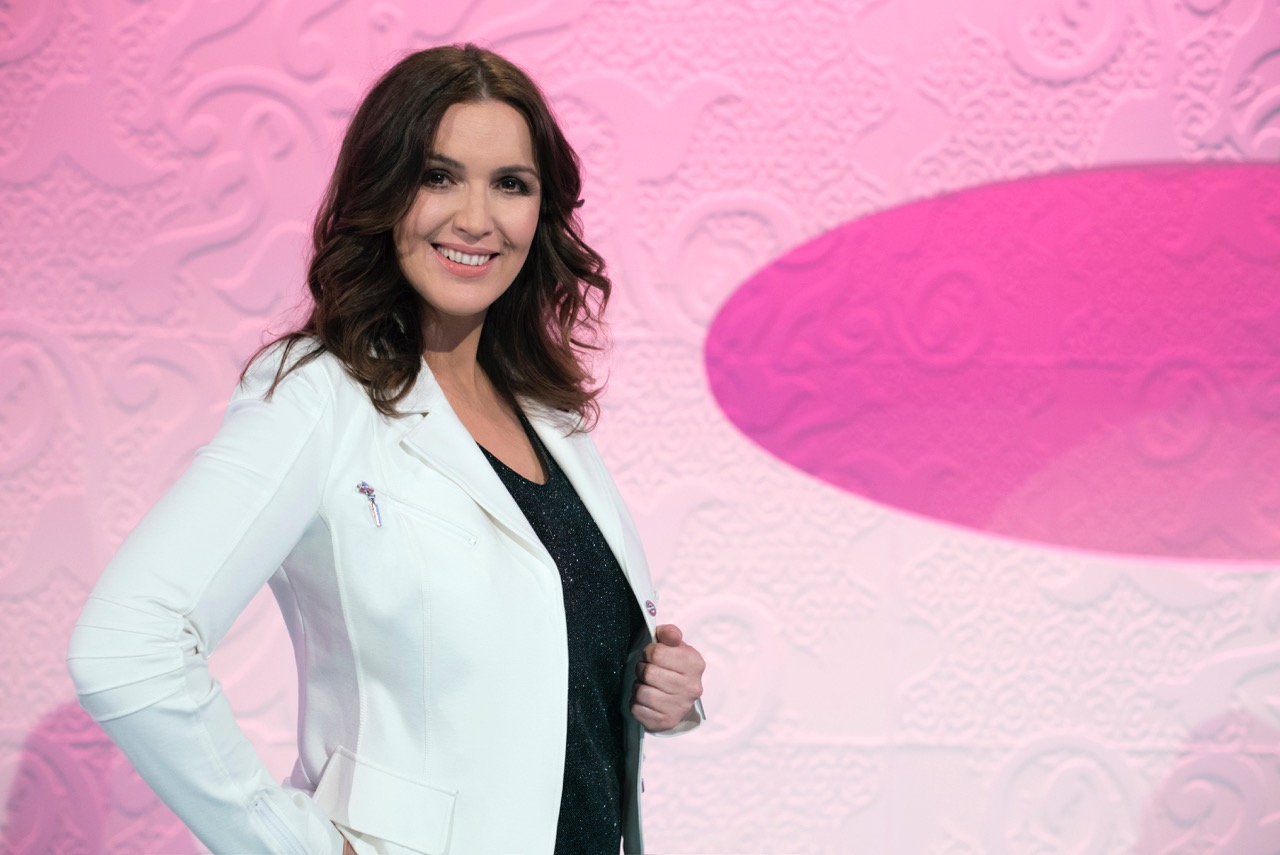
Barbara Karlich

Barbara Karlich (born 7 January 1969 in Vienna) is an Austrian television presenter, journalist and publicist.

Barbara Karlich is the daughter of the entrepreneur Viktor Karlich and the librarian Katharina Karlich. She grew up in Trausdorf in Burgenland and belongs to the Burgenland-Croat minority. She graduated from the Eisenstadt high school in 1987. Karlich studied journalism, psychology and theater studies at the University of Vienna and completed his studies in journalism. She also attended the university course in public relations.

In 1999 Karlich was brought to ORF television by the director Kathrin Zechner, where she has been hosting her weekdays show since 27 October 1999. The Barbara Karlich Show on ORF2 is the only remaining talk show on German-language television and thus holds the record of the longest-broadcast talk shows (since October 1999) in Germany, Switzerland and Austria. In the summer of 2001 she led through the reality documentary Wie das Leben so spielt (How life so plays), which showed people in special and moving moments in their lives.
