= Andy Lee Lang =

Austrian rock'n'roll musician

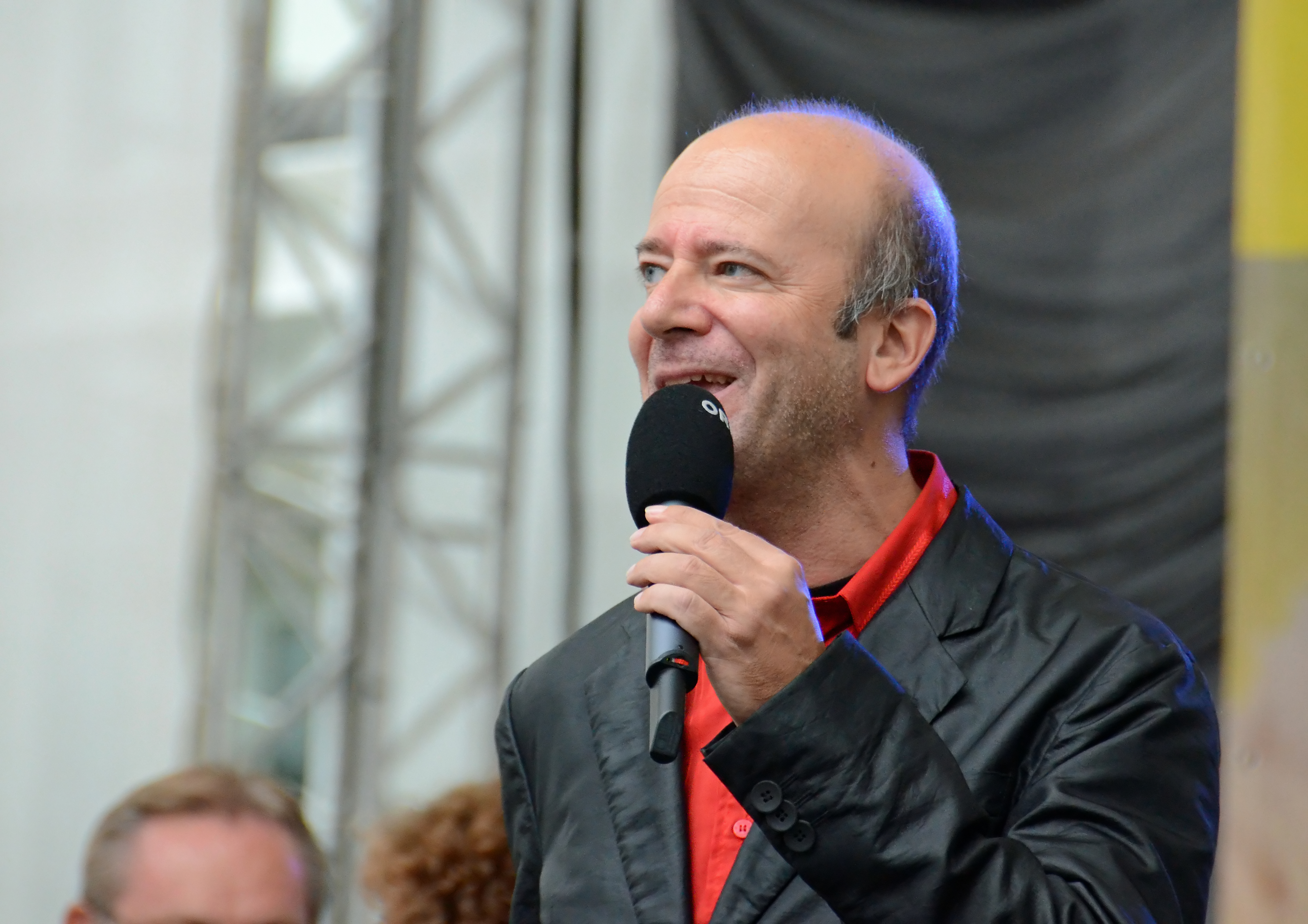

Background information
- Also known as: "The Austrian Ambassador of Rock 'n' Roll"
- Born: Andreas Lang; 26 July 1965 (age 61); Vienna, Austria
- Genres: Rock'n'roll
- Occupation: Musician
- Instruments: Singing, piano
- Years active: 1985–present
- Formerly of: Rock 'n' Roll Rats; The Nighthawks; The Spirit; The Rocking Three
- Website: andyleelang.at

Andreas Lang, better known by the stagename Andy Lee Lang (born Vienna 26 July 1965) is an Austrian rock'n'roll musician. He has performed with Jerry Lee Lewis, Chuck Berry, George Harrison and Fats Domino.
