= Dagmar Koller =

Austrian actress and singer (born 1939)

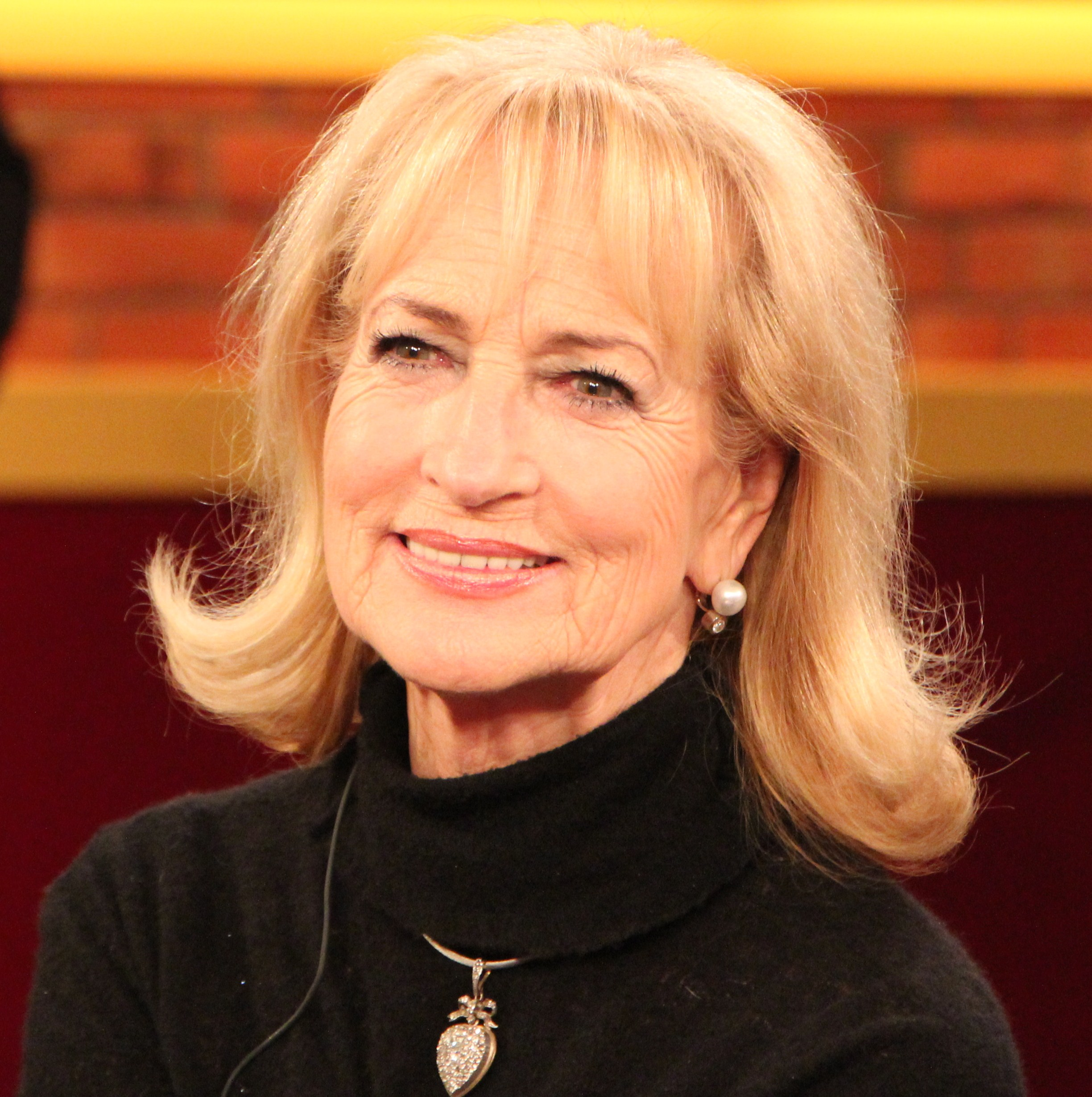
- Dagmar Koller (2011)
- Born: 26 August 1939 (age 87); Klagenfurt, Nazi Germany (present day Austria)

Dagmar Koller (born 26 August 1939) is an Austrian actress and singer.

== Life ==
Born in Klagenfurt, she is recognized as a leading German language musical singer. She married Austrian broadcaster and politician, Helmut Zilk, in 1978. She became the first lady of Vienna while he served as mayor. During this time she maintained her career, playing the roles of Eliza Doolittle in My Fair Lady and Dulcinea in Man of La Mancha, while also hosting her own television show. As First Lady of Vienna she received such international luminaries as Prince Charles and Diana, Princess of Wales, Frank Sinatra, Liza Minnelli, Plácido Domingo, and American First Lady, Nancy Reagan. She is credited with having saved her husband's life after a letter bomb explosion in their private residence.

== Award ==
She was given an award in 2015.
