= Elisabeth Engstler =

Austrian television presenter

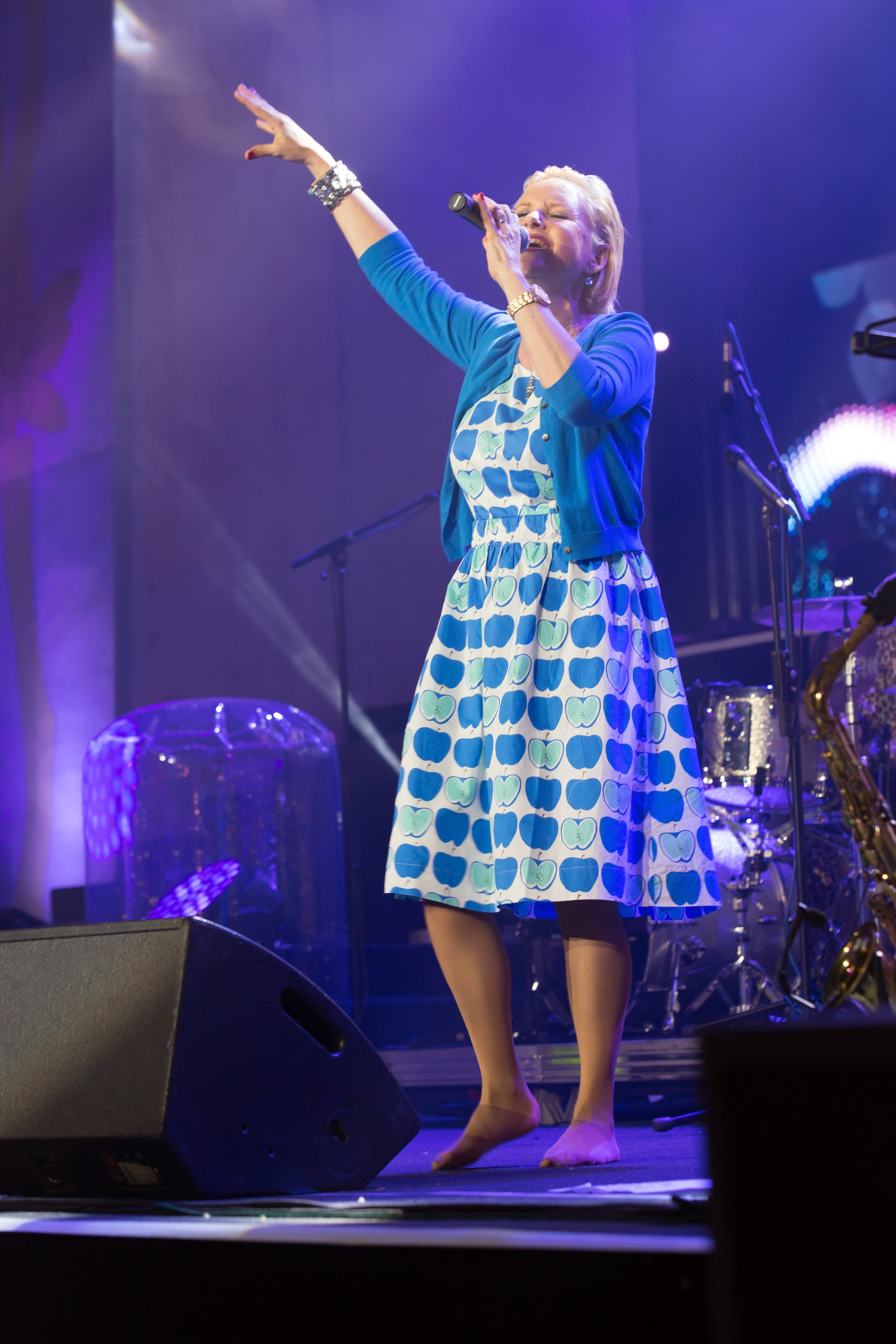
Image of Elisabeth Engstler

Elisabeth "Lizzi" Engstler (born May 6, 1960, in Villach) is an Austrian television presenter, music performer and singer who took part in the Eurovision Song Contest with the duo Mess in 1982.

== Life and career ==
Elisabeth Engstler grew up in the Seehotel Engstler on Wörthersee. After school, she began to study medicine in Vienna, but did not finish. In 1982 she represented Austria at the Eurovision Song Contest with Michael Scheickl as the duo "Mess" with the song Sonntag and reached ninth place. The duo released the titles Do-Re-Mi-Fa-So oder so, Träumen von Olivenbäumen, Cabrio and Ich will ein Eis as well as the two English versions of their competition entry Honey Bee and Sunday. Mess then disbanded.

Engstler began studying at the Konservatorium der Stadt Wien (operetta, musical and chanson). After an engagement at the Burgtheater and the leading role in the musical "Valerie" at the Wiener Festwochen, she completed her training in 1986. Since then, she has presented Ferienexpress for ORF, from 1987 Wurlitzer, Ich und Du, Die große Chance, Happy End, from 1995 to 2007 alongside Wolfram Pirchner Willkommen Österreich and Frisch gekocht. In 2005, she received the Romy as the most popular presenter.

Until 1996 she presented radio programs such as Querstadtein and Autofahrer unterwegs. Since 1997 she has been performing as a singer again and released a CD with love songs and musical hits under the title Endlich wieder Musik.

Alternating with Reinhard Jesionek and Verena Scheitz, she hosted the early evening programs Frühlingszeit, Sommerzeit, Herbstzeit and Winterzeit on ORF from June 2007 to September 2012. In the program heute leben she was an outside reporter, in the successor format Daheim in Österreich she is also occasionally. In 2008, Elisabeth Engstler took part in the ORF dance show Dancing Stars. With her partner Alexander Zaglmaier, she took second place behind her ORF colleague Dorian Steidl with partner Nicole Kuntner. In March 2009 she published Mein Chaos-Kochbuch. The audio CD Sehnsucht was released in 2011. From January 7, 2014, until the end of 2014, Elisabeth Engstler hosted Frisch gekocht again.

Since September 2017 Elisabeth Engstler has played the role of hotel manager Romy Edler in the jukebox musical I Am from Austria.

In 2020 she recorded the announcements for the Badner Bahn. As part of the Sommernachtskomödie Rosenburg in 2023, she played the role of Queen Elizabeth in a stage version of Shakespeare in Love directed by Marcus Ganser.

== Awards ==
- 2005: Golden Romy as most popular presenter (Audience Award)
