= Dirk Heidemann =

German dancer and choreographer

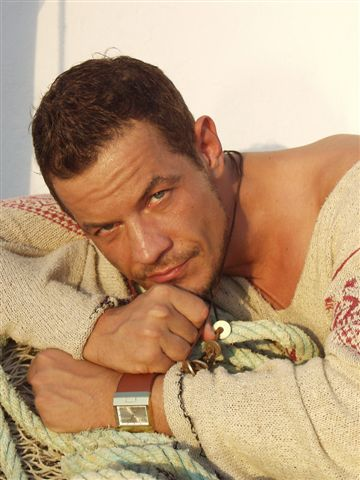
- Dirk Heidemann, 2008
- Born: 18 April 1961 (age 64); Berlin, Germany
- Occupations: Dance Coach, Choreographer and author
- Known for: professional dancing and fashion modelling

Dirk Heidemann (born 18 April 1961) is a former professional ballroom dancer, fashion model, now author, dance sport coach and choreographer from Germany. He has several years of experience in the various fields of dancing.

In former years, Heidemann won the national youth championships several times and was runner-up to the German Latin-American championships. At the age of 17, he switched to professional dancing, and in 1993 he reached the world championship final in the Freestyle World Cup in Latin American dancing.

Heidemann is the trainer of several world champion couples, and a trainer in the official German Dancesport Federation (DTV) trainer team. He trained Christoph Kies and Blanca Ribas Turón to become three-time world champions in the ten-dance (Standard and Latin) category.

Since 1999 he has had a leading position in the Chinese "Danceworld". He was one of the most popular choreographers and art directors for the Presentation-Shows of China during the 2008 Olympic Games. His dancesport musical The Red Skirt, with members of the Beijing Dance Academy, was a big success in 2001 and was copied several times. Dirk Heidemann has appeared in more than ten talk and news shows on China Central Television (CCTV).

Between 2006 and 2010, Heidemann was the choreographer for two German casting shows (You Can Dance, on Sat.1, German Idol (Deutschland sucht den Superstar) on RTL).

In the dancing scene, he is regarded as a style icon and a fashion model, with a particularly creative mind. He has authored articles on dancing contests, worked as the German national youth trainer in Latin American Dancing and is Professor for competitive dancing at the Sports University of Zhengzhou, China.

The World DanceSport Federation (WDSF) commissioned Heidemann in March 2013 to create the choreography for a flash mob in the World Dance Sport Games 2013 in Kaohsiung, Taiwan. He chose the song "Stamp Your Feet" of the then recently deceased singer Donna Summer. In April 2013, a video in Sant Cugat, Spain was shot, with Heidemann present to witness them dancing. The flash mob was presented at the opening event with great success. At the final event around 6,500 athletes, "Stamp Your Feet" danced before live TV cameras. "Stamp your Feet" is now regarded as one of the largest flash mobs in the world.

On 9 November 2014, Heidemann presented his first TV comedy show "Germany's Most Embarrassing Dancers" on RTL Germany.

In 2015, Heidemann led the Russian champions Armen Tsaturyan and Svetlana Gudyno as a coach to win the European Championship and to become the vice-world title in the Latin dances. In addition, the Israeli couple Artyom Liaskovsky and Liana Odikadze, also coached by him, became world champion in Latin dances in the "Under-21" category. It is the first ever world title for Israel in dance sports.

He currently lives in Berlin.
