= Dolly Buster =

Czech-German pornographic actress

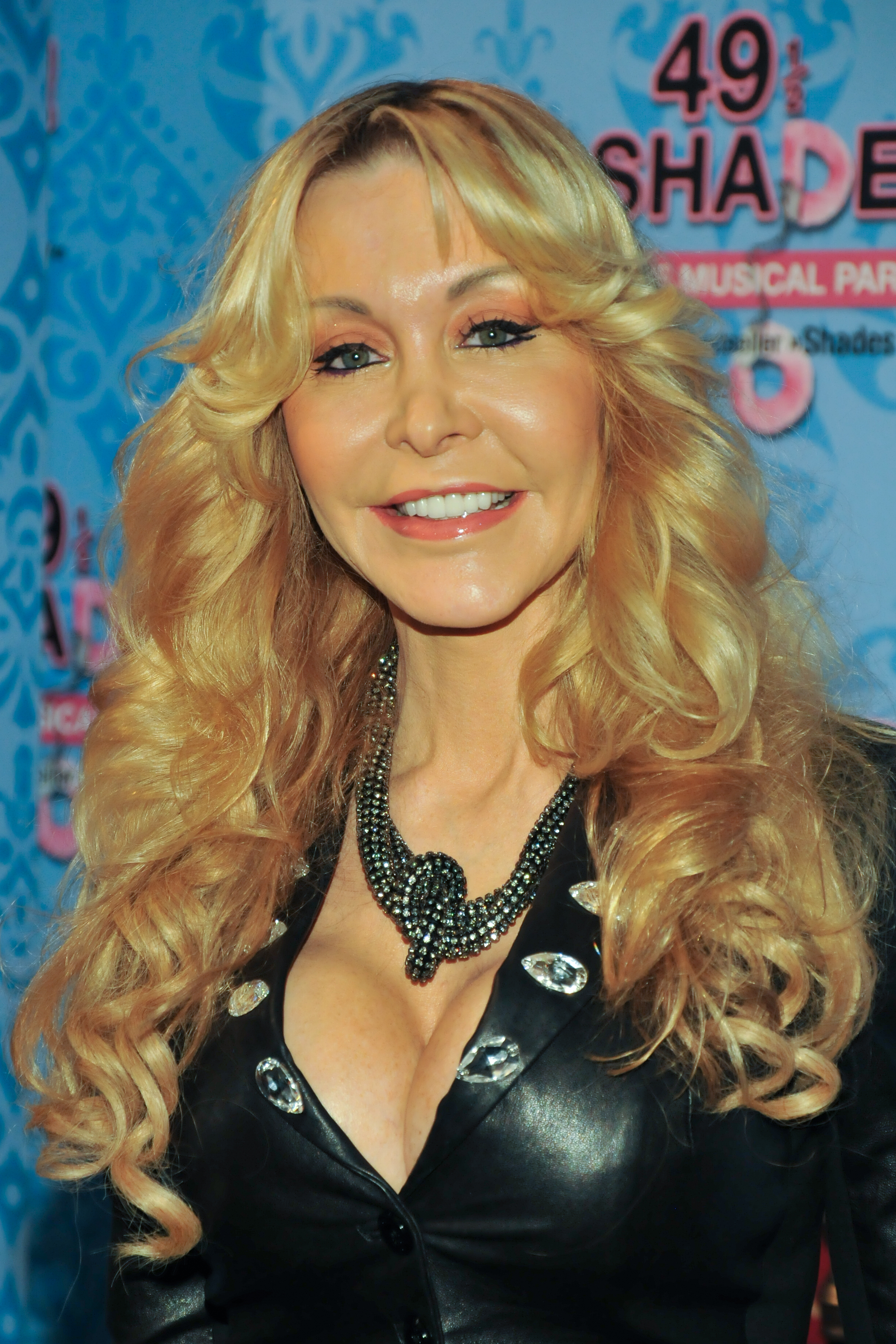
- Buster in 2014
- Born: Nora Dvořáková; 23 October 1969 (age 57); Prague, Czechoslovakia
- Other names: Mandy Dvorjack; Mandy Rice; Kateřina Bochníčková; Gloria Saxon; Hellena; Mandy Dvorak; Mandy Lice; Mandy Rice; Nora List; Norma List
- Occupations: Pornographic actress; filmmaker; author
- Height: 1.75 m (5 ft 9 in)

Nora Baumberger (née Dvořáková; born 23 October 1969), known by the stage name Dolly Buster, is a Czech-German former pornographic actress, filmmaker, and author.

== Career ==
Buster has starred in over one hundred X-rated European movies. She is also the author of a successful series of crime-novels about a German porn-star-turned-amateur-sleuth.

She appeared in the German version of I'm a Celebrity... Get Me Out of Here!.

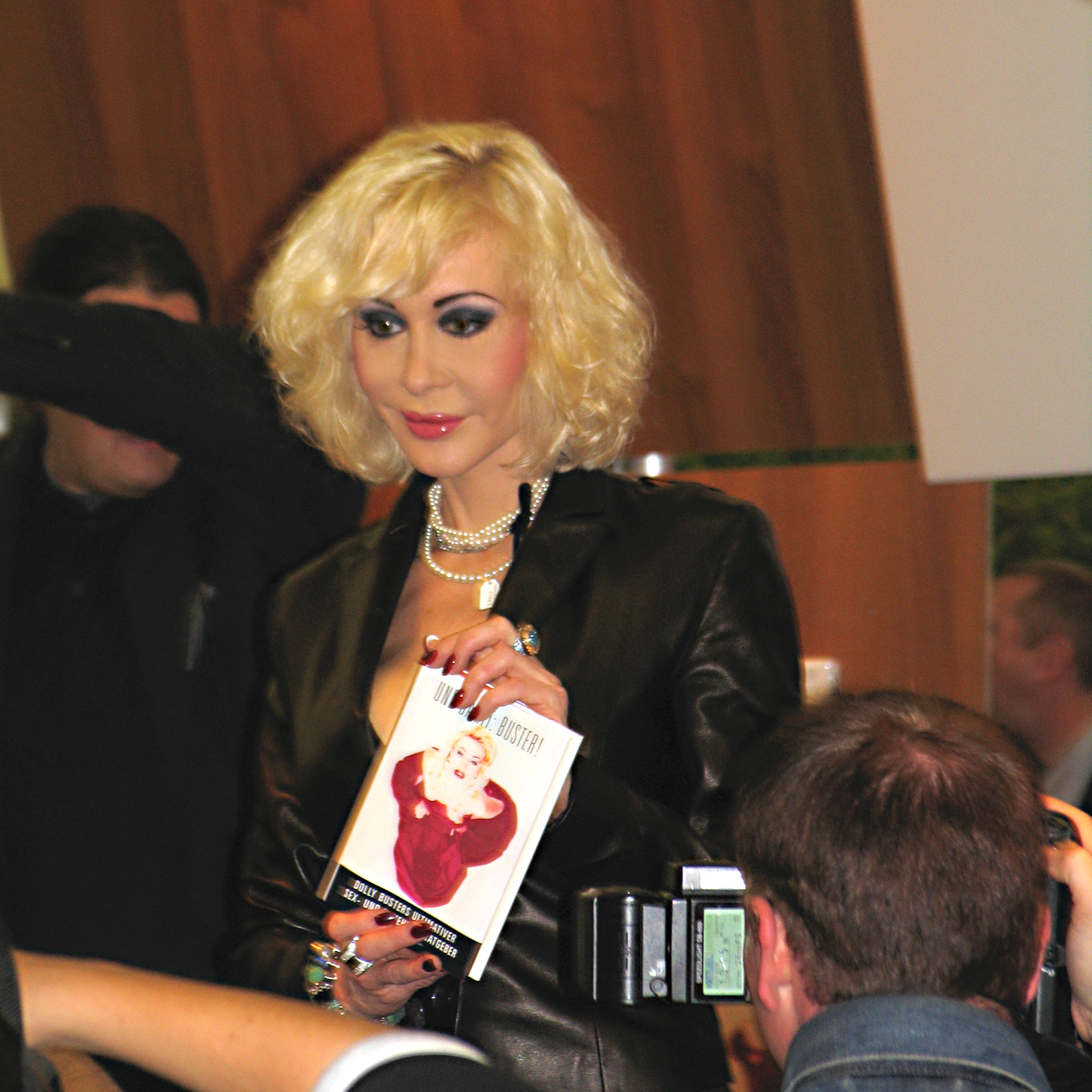
Buster at the Frankfurt Book Fair, 2004

In 2004, she attempted to obtain a seat in the European Parliament as a candidate of a minority Czech political party. The party got 0.71% of votes.

== Personal life ==
Buster lives with her husband in Wesel, Germany, also indulging in painting and drawing, having taken life-drawing classes from Arnim Tölke at the Kunstakademie Düsseldorf.

== Awards ==
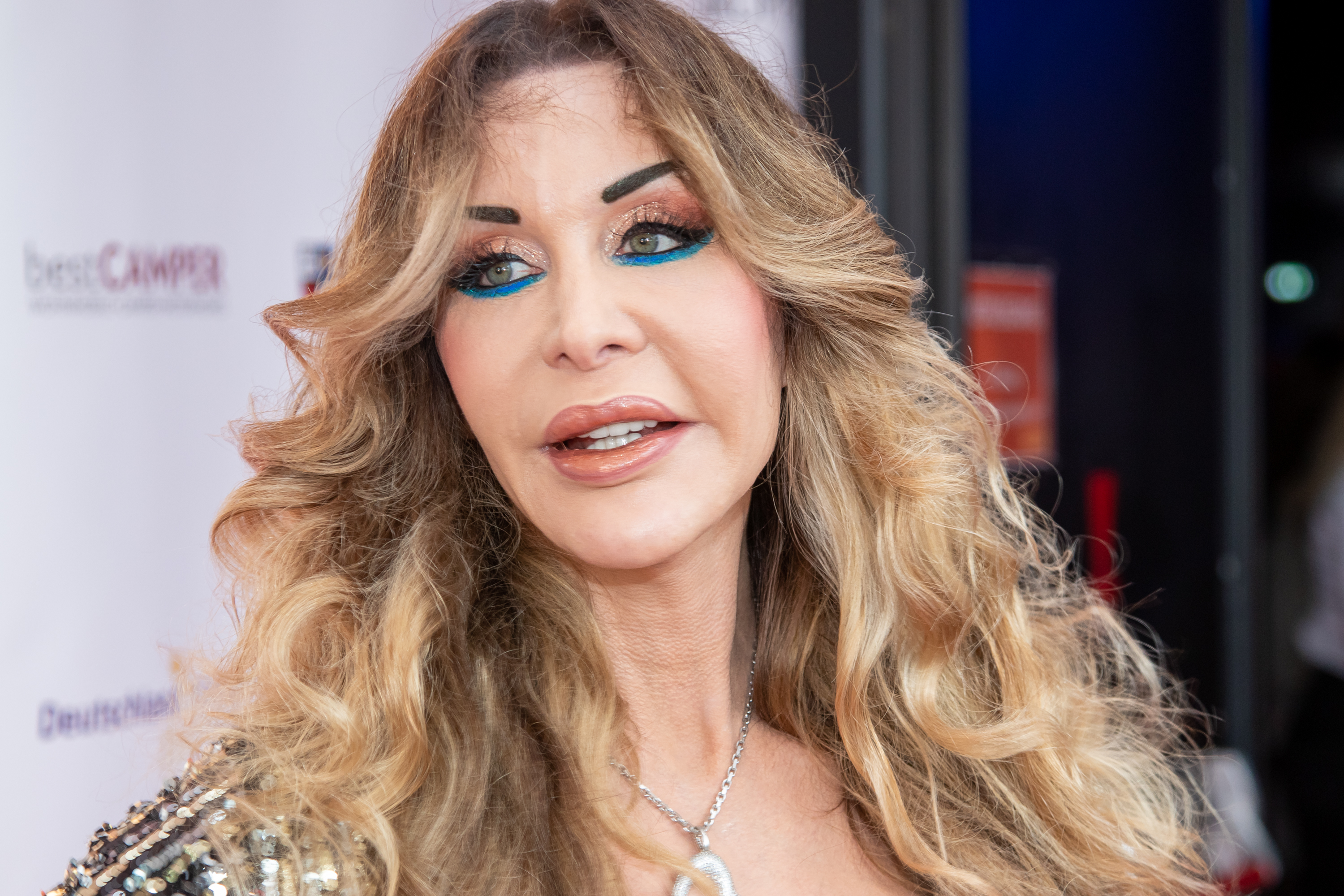
Dolly Buster in 2021

She was voted Germany's "hottest porn star" in 2009. She has also won several Venus Awards, including a Lifetime Achievement Award in 2000 and a Special Jury Award in 2003.
