= Frank Schinkels =

Austrian footballer (born 1963)

Frenkie Schinkels
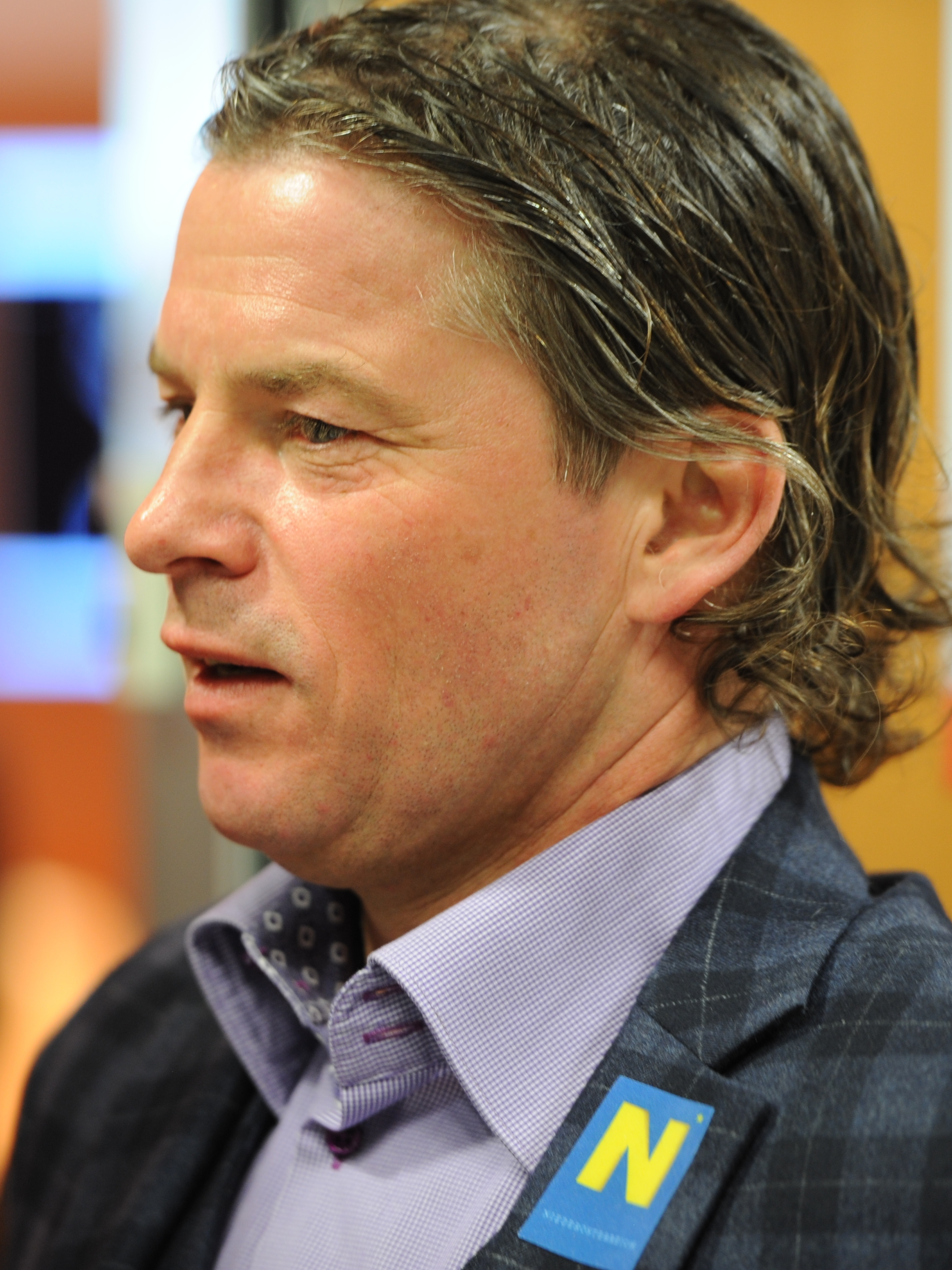

Personal information
- Full name: Frank Schinkels
- Date of birth: 9 January 1963 (age 63)
- Place of birth: Rotterdam, Netherlands
- Height: 1.68 m (5 ft 6 in)
- Position: Midfielder

Team information
- Current team: SKN St. Pölten (sporting director)

Youth career
- 1977–1979: Feyenoord

Senior career*
Years	Team	Apps	(Gls)
1979–1980	Feyenoord	0	(0)
1981–1982	Halmstads BK	37	(2)
1983–1984	AZ Alkmaar	15	(0)
1984–1985	Excelsior Rotterdam	11	(3)
1985–1986	Salzburger AK 1914	0	(0)
1986–1987	Wiener Sport Klub	27	(4)
1987–1988	Austria Wien	33	(1)
1988–1989	SV Spittal an der Drau	0	(0)
1989–1990	VÖEST Linz	0	(0)
1990–1992	VSE St.Pölten	67	(8)
1992–1993	SV Austria Salzburg	7	(0)
1993–1994	VSE St.Pölten	16	(0)
1994–1995	SV Gerasdorf	0	(0)
1995	Hollenburg	?	(?)
1995	SV Karlstetten-Neidling	?	(?)
1995	SC Harland	?	(?)

International career^{‡}
1992–1994	Austria	7	(1)

Managerial career
- ????–????: SC Stattersdorf
- 1995: SC Harland
- 1995–1998: VSE St.Pölten
- 2001: Kremser SC
- 2002: ASK Kottingbrunn
- 2004: SKN St. Pölten
- 2006: Austria Wien
- 2007–2008: 1. FC Vöcklabruck
- 2008–2009: SK Austria Kärnten
- 2010: First Vienna FC
- 2012–2014: Kremser SC
- 2014–: SKN St. Pölten (sporting director)
- * Club domestic league appearances and goals as of 27 May 2016 ‡ National team caps and goals as of 29 September 2008

Frank "Frenkie" Schinkels (born 9 January 1963) is a former professional footballer who played as a midfielder and Austrian international team player and current coach.

== Club career ==
Schinkels started his career in the Feyenoord youth squad. He never represented the club at senior level since Feyenoord manager Jan Mak moved to Sweden's Halmstads BK and took Schinkels with him, making him the first foreign player ever to play for the club. He spent 2 seasons in Sweden before moving back home to the Netherlands to play for AZ Alkmaar and then Excelsior Rotterdam.

After only 2 seasons back in his homeland, he moved to Austria and joined Salzburger AK 1914. While in Austria, he represented a large number of clubs at various levels, having his longest stint with VSE St. Pölten and encountering some success with SV Austria Salzburg, when the club came second in the Bundesliga in 1992–1993 season.

He remained an active player until 2005, during which time he also qualified as an UEFA licensed coach and went on to coach three of his former clubs.

== International career ==
During his time in Austria he gained Austrian citizenship and was chosen to represent the Austria national team in 7 games between 1992 and 1994, scoring 1 goal against the Netherlands.
