= Erste Allgemeine Verunsicherung discography =

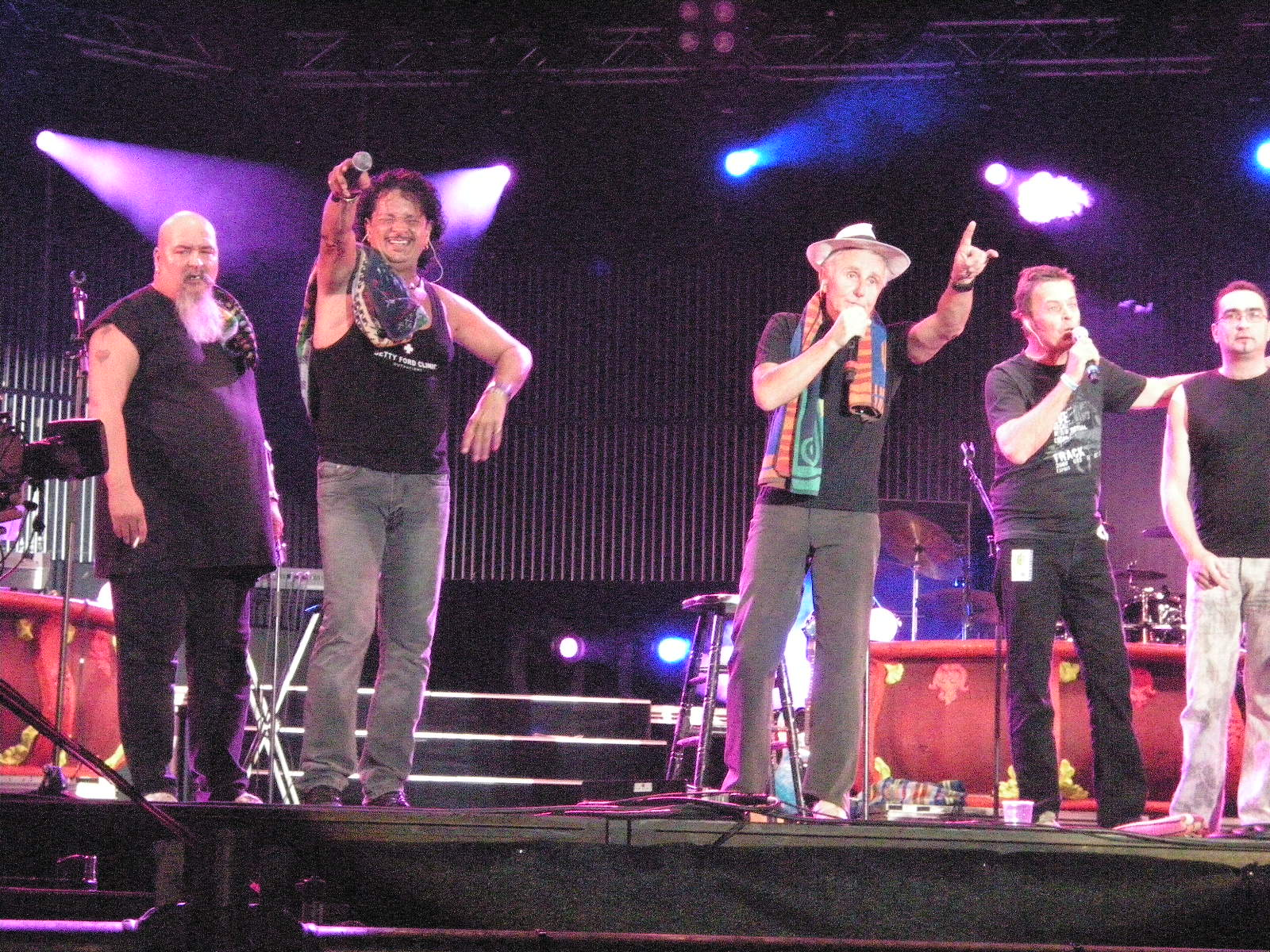
- The EAV at the Donauinselfest in 2005
- Studio albums: 16
- Extended plays: 1
- Live albums: 1
- Compilation albums: 10
- Singles: 43

The Austrian band Erste Allgemeine Verunsicherung released sixteen studio albums, one live album, one extended play and forty-one singles since their foundation in 1978.

== Chart performance ==
=== Studio albums ===
Year	Title	Translation of the Title	Chart positions		
Year	Title	Translation of the Title	AT	DE	CH
1978	1. Allgemeine Verunsicherung	1st General Confusion	17	—	—
1981	Café Passé	Café Passé	—	—	—
1983	Spitalo Fatalo	Hospitalo Fatalo	5	—	—
1984	À la Carte	À la Carte	11	—	—
1985	Geld oder Leben!	Your Money or Your Life!	1	10	3
1987	Liebe, Tod & Teufel	Love, Death & Devil	1	3	1
1990	Neppomuk's Rache	Neppomuk's Revenge	1	2	3
1991	Watumba!	Watumba!	1	17	15
1994	Nie wieder Kunst	No More Art	1	40	17
1997	Im Himmel ist die Hölle los!	All Hell Is Breaking Loose In Heaven!	1	37	20
1998	Himbeerland	Raspberryland	2	55	30
2000	Austropop in Tot-Weiss-Tot ^{3}	Austropop in Dead-White-Dead	12	—	—
2003	Frauenluder	Woman Slut	1	90	—
2007	Amore XL	Love XL	1	46	83
2010	Neue Helden braucht das Land	The Nation Needs New Heroes	1	26	34
2015	Werwolf-Attacke – Monsterball ist überall	Werewolf Attack – Monsterball Is Everywhere	1	15	16
2016	Was haben wir gelacht...	How We Laughed...	8	57	49
2018	Alles ist erlaubt	Everything Goes	2	7	13
2019	1000 Jahre EAV live - Der Abschied	1,000 Years of EAV Live - The Farewell	2	3	30
2021	EAVliche Weihnachten – Ihr Sünderlein kommet	EAVlike Christmas – Oh Come, Ye Little Sinners	2	20	38

=== Singles ===
Year	Title	Translation of the Title	Chart positions			Album
Year	Title	Translation of the Title	AT	DE	CH	Album
1979	"Ihr Kinderlein kommet"	"O Come, Little Children"	—	—	—	no album
1981	"Alpen-Punk"	"Alpine Punk"	—	—	—	Café Passé
1981	"Oh, nur Du"	"Oh, Only You"	—	—	—	Café Passé
1982	"Total verunsichert"	"Totally Insecure"	—	—	—	Spitalo Fatalo
1983	"Der Alpen-Rap"	"The Alpine Rap"	6	36	13	Spitalo Fatalo
1983	"Afrika – Ist der Massa gut bei Kassa"	"Africa – If the Massa Is in the Money"	6	—	—	Spitalo Fatalo
1984	"Die Braut und der Matrose"	"The Bride and the Sailor"	—	—	—	À la Carte
1984	"Go, Karli, Go!"	"Go, Karli, Go!"	6	—	—	À la Carte
1984	"Schweine-Funk"	"Pig Funk"	—	—	—	À la Carte
1984	"Liebelei"	"Flirtation"	—	—	—	À la Carte
1985	"Ba-Ba-Banküberfall"	"Ba-Ba-Bankrobbery"	4	7	—	Geld oder Leben!
1985	"Märchenprinz"	"Prince Charming"	1	16	—	Geld oder Leben!
1986	"Heiße Nächte in Palermo"	"Hot Nights in Palermo"	3	16	—	Geld oder Leben!
1986	"Fata Morgana"	"Fata Morgana"	11	27	—	Geld oder Leben!
1987	"Küss die Hand, schöne Frau"	"Kiss the Hand, Pretty Lady"	1	2	2	Liebe, Tod & Teufel
1988	"An der Copacabana"	"At the Copacabana"	2	11	8	Liebe, Tod & Teufel
1988	"Burli"	"Boy"	24	41	—	Liebe, Tod & Teufel
1988	"Kann denn Schwachsinn Sünde sein...?"	"Can Imbecility Be a Sin...?"	10	25	24	Kann denn Schwachsinn Sünde sein...?
1989	"Es steht ein Haus in Ostberlin" ^{1}	"There Is a House in East Berlin"	—	—	—	Neppomuk's Rache
1990	"Ding Dong"	"Ding Dong"	1	7	4	Neppomuk's Rache
1990	"Samurai"	"Samurai"	2	10	17	Neppomuk's Rache
1990	"Einer geht um die Welt"	"One Goes for a Tour Around the World"	26	—	—	Neppomuk's Rache
1991	"S'Muaterl"	"The Gammer"	—	—	—	Neppomuk's Rache
1991	"Jambo"	"Jambo"	6	30	26	Watumba!
1992	"Hip Hop"	"Hip Hop"	27	77	—	Watumba!
1992	"Insp. Tatü"	"Inspector Nee-naw"	—	—	—	Watumba!
1994	"300 PS (Auto...)"	"300 HP (Car...)"	5	—	—	Nie wieder Kunst
1995	"Einmal möchte ich ein Böser sein"	"I Want to Be a Bad Guy for Once"	17	—	—	Nie wieder Kunst
1995	"Flugzeug"	"Aeroplane"	—	—	—	Nie wieder Kunst
1995	"Cinderella"	"Cinderella"	—	—	—	Nie wieder Kunst
1997	"Schau wie's schneit"	"Look How It's Snowing"	17	—	—	Im Himmel ist die Hölle los!
1997	"Blöd"	"Stupid"	—	—	—	Im Himmel ist die Hölle los!
1997	"Bongo Boy"	"Bongo Boy"	32	—	—	Im Himmel ist die Hölle los!
1998	"Der Wein von Mykonos" ^{2}	"The Wine from Mykonos"	8	—	—	Himbeerland
1998	"Die Pille für den Mann" ^{2}	"The Pill for Men"	—	—	—	Himbeerland
1999	"Hasta la Vista"	"Hasta la Vista"	35	—	—	Himbeerland
1999	"3 weiße Tauben"	"3 White Doves"	—	31	—	Himbeerland
2000	"Ba-Ba-Ballamann"	"Ba-Ba-Ballamann" (refers to Ballermann 6)	—	—	—	no album
2004	"God Bless America"	"God Bless America"	24	—	—	100 Jahre EAV - Ihr habt es so gewollt!!
2010	"Neue Helden (braucht das Land)"	"(The Country Is in Need Of) New Heroes"	38	—	—	Neue Helden braucht das Land

==== Non-German singles ====
- 1983: Alp-Rapp (Swedish version of "Der Alpen-Rap")
- 1986: Ba-Ba-Bankrobbery (English version of "Ba-Ba-Banküberfall", peaked at #63 on the UK Singles Chart)

=== Compilation albums ===
Year	Title	Translation of the Title	Chart positions			Note
Year	Title	Translation of the Title	AT	DE	CH	Note
1987	Das Beste aus guten und alten Tagen	The Best from Good and Old Days	—	—	—	out of print
1988	Kann denn Schwachsinn Sünde sein...?	Can Imbecility Be a Sin...?	2	13	15	including many rare songs
1989	Erste Allgemeine Verunsicherung	First General Uncertainty	—	—	—	released in East Germany only
1995	Live Kunst-Tour 95	Live Art Tour 95	12	—	—	live album
1996	The Grätest Hitz	The Greatest Hits	10	61	—	
2000	Let's Hop – Das Allerbeste, aber feste	Let's Hop – The Very Best, Yet Solid	9	67	—	including new versions of old songs
2004	The Very Best of E.A.V.	The Very Best of E.A.V.	—	—	—	
2005	100 Jahre EAV... Ihr habt es so gewollt!!	100 Years of EAV... You Asked for It!!	4	40	78	including new versions of old songs
2005	Platinum Kolläktschn	Platinum Collection	41	—	—	including many rare songs
2009	Best of Austropop	Best of Austropop	—	—	—	
2009	The Essential	The Essential	—	—	—	

=== Extended plays ===
Year	Title	Translation of the Title	Chart positions			Note
Year	Title	Translation of the Title	AT	DE	CH	Note
2008	"Mei herrlich"	"How Delightful"	—	—	—	only as a download

== Footnotes ==
- ^{1} = released under the alias Ossi Ostborn (roughly translated: "Easterner Eastborn", but the name also sounds phonetically like Ozzy Osbourne), the song refers to the reunification of East Germany and West Germany
- ^{2} = released under the alias The Himbeer Teddies ("The Raspberry Teddies"), the songs satirize the style of music Schlager
- ^{3} = released under the alias Klaus Eberhartinger & Die Gruftgranaten ("Klaus Eberhartinger & The Tomb Bombshells"), the album parodies several Austropop hit songs. It also refers to the national flag of Austria, which colors are red-white-red (Rot-Weiß-Rot) in German language.
