= List of best-selling albums in Austria =

This is a list of the best-selling albums in Austria that have been certified by the IFPI. Since January 1, 2013, BVMI certifies an album platinum for the shipment of 15,000 copies across Austria. All albums in this list must have been certified for more than 100,000 copies.

Certifications for albums released in Austria depend upon their release date.

== Gold and Platinum certification awards (Timeline) ==
Albums

Certification	Before January 1, 2001	Before January 1, 2003	Before January 1, 2007	Before January 1, 2013	Since January 1, 2013
Gold	25,000	20,000	15,000	10,000	7,500
Platinum	50,000	40,000	30,000	20,000	15,000

Sortable table
Year	Title	Artist	Certification	Shipments
1982	Thriller	Michael Jackson	8× Platinum	400,000
2002	Mensch	Herbert Grönemeyer	8× Platinum	320,000
2013	Farbenspiel	Helene Fischer	18× Platinum	270,000
1985	Geld oder Leben!	Erste Allgemeine Verunsicherung	5× Platinum	250,000
1985	Grenzenlos	STS	5× Platinum	250,000
2001	Best Of	Andrea Berg	6× Platinum	240,000
2006	Back to Black	Amy Winehouse	7× Platinum	210,000
1981	Greatest Hits	Queen	4× Platinum	200,000
1985	Brothers in Arms	Dire Straits	4× Platinum	200,000
1987	Bad	Michael Jackson	4× Platinum	200,000
1990	Neppomuk's Rache	Erste Allgemeine Verunsicherung	4× Platinum	200,000
1991	Dangerous	Michael Jackson	4× Platinum	200,000
1991	Greatest Hits II	Queen	4× Platinum	200,000
1992	Aufgeig'n statt niederschiass'n	Hubert von Goisern	4× Platinum	200,000
1992	The Bodyguard: Original Soundtrack Album	Whitney Houston/Various Artists	4× Platinum	200,000
2010	Best Of	Helene Fischer	9× Platinum	180,000
2001	Swing When You're Winning	Robbie Williams	4× Platinum	160,000
2002	Escapology	Robbie Williams	4× Platinum	160,000
2010	Herzwerk	Andreas Gabalier	8× Platinum	160,000
2011	Volksrock'n'Roller	Andreas Gabalier	8× Platinum	160,000
1973	1962–1966	The Beatles	3× Platinum	150,000
1973	1967–1970	The Beatles	3× Platinum	150,000
1985	Grenzenlos	S.T.S.	3× Platinum	150,000
1989	Foreign Affair	Tina Turner	3× Platinum	150,000
1990	Feuer im ewigen Eis	Kastelruther Spatzen	3× Platinum	150,000
1990	The Very Best of Elton John	Elton John	3× Platinum	150,000
1991	Joyride	Roxette	3× Platinum	150,000
1992	Gold: Greatest Hits	ABBA	3× Platinum	150,000
1993	Darum lieb’ ich Dich	Brunner und Brunner	3× Platinum	150,000
1994	Cross Road	Bon Jovi	3× Platinum	150,000
1995	Tekkno ist cool - Vol. 1	Die Schlümpfe	3× Platinum	150,000
1996	Backstreet Boys	Backstreet Boys	3× Platinum	150,000
1996	Dove c'è musica	Eros Ramazzotti	3× Platinum	150,000
1999	L'Amour Toujours	Gigi D'Agostino	3× Platinum	150,000
2000	1	The Beatles	3× Platinum	150,000
2008	Chant - Music For Paradise	The Cistercian Monks Of Stift Heiligenkreuz	7× Platinum	140,000
2008	The Fame	Lady Gaga	7× Platinum	140,000
2002	Junischnee	Seer	3× Platinum	120,000
2003	Freier Fall	Christina Stürmer	4× Platinum	120,000
2004	Greatest Hits	Robbie Williams	4× Platinum	120,000
2015	Weihnachten	Helene Fischer	8× Platinum	120,000
1996	Evita	Madonna	2× Platinum	100,000
1998	Ray of Light	Madonna	2× Platinum	100,000
1997	Let's Talk About Love	Celine Dion	2× Platinum	100,000
1996	Falling Into You	Celine Dion	2× Platinum	100,000
1981	Cats	Theater an der Wien	2× Platinum	100,000
1986	Nuovi eroi	Eros Ramazzotti	2× Platinum	100,000
1984	Private Dancer	Tina Turner	2× Platinum	100,000

== By claimed sales ==
Year	Artist	Album	Sales
1987	Erste Allgemeine Verunsicherung	Liebe, Tod & Teufel	350,000
1987	S.T.S.	Augenblicke	200,000
1998	Falco	Out of the Dark (Into the Light)	110,000
	Klaus & Ferdi	20 Most Successful Songs	100,000
1987	Various Artists	Dirty Dancing	100,000
