= Furstenfeld =

Furstenfeld may refer to:

- Fürstenfeld, a city in Austria
- Fürstenfeld (song), a song by S.T.S.
- Jeremy Furstenfeld, drummer for Blue October
- Justin Furstenfeld, singer for Blue October
