= Katharina Paldauf =

Austrian witch trial victim (died 1675)

Katharina Paldauf (born about 1625 in Fürstenfeld; died probably 23 September 1675), born Fondell, was the wife of the keeper of the Riegersburg Castle and the most prominent victim of the Great Witch trial of Feldbach (1673–1675). As a so-called "flower witch" in Riegersburg after her death she was known far beyond her home region.

== Life ==
Katharina Paltauf was born about 1625. At 20, she entered the service of Elisabeth Katharina Freifrau von Galler († 1672), the owner of the Riegersburg Castle. There, she met her future husband Johann Simon Paltauf, who was employed by the "bad Liesl", as the lady of the castle was popularly known as castle keeper (administrator). The couple had at least three children: Katharina, Anna and Ferdinand.

In the spring of 1675, when Katharina was about 50 years old she was accused of having manipulated weather and participated in witch Sabbaths, arrested and incarcerated in Feldbach. Though she initially denied the accusations, after being tortured she confessed and gave the names of other people that she said participated in witch meetings. She was found guilty and sentenced to death. She was first killed and then burnt to the stake, probably on 23 September 1675.
