= Burli =

1987 song

"Burli" is the name of a controversial song in German by Austrian band Erste Allgemeine Verunsicherung. It is the eighth track of their album entitled Liebe, Tod & Teufel (Love, Death and Devil).

The song is about a boy named Burli, who suffered mutations due to a nuclear power plant disaster. The incident is described as a "Super-GAU", which means the worst possible scenario in such circumstances in the German language. The song details how he suffers problems as a result of this, including having four hands with each having ten fingers, however no-one could play the piano as quickly as him. The story does have a happy ending as he marries his also-mutant neighbour Amelia (Auch sie hat einiges zuviel, als Andenken an Tschernobyl (she also owns to much [organs], in memory of Chernobyl)). The song also mentions that he has more than one sex organ.

The song reached number 41 in the German music charts on 6 June 1988 and remained in the charts for seven weeks. It also reached number 24 in the Austrian music charts on 15 June 1988 and remained in the charts for four weeks. The song is controversial because people believed it was making fun of people with disabilities, especially as it was shortly after the Chernobyl disaster, however one main trait of Erste Allgemeine Verunsicherung is that they are known for singing songs about recent events. Because of that many radio stations boycott Burli.
