= Watumba! =

Studio album by Erste Allgemeine Verunsicherung
- Released: November 21, 1991

Watumba! is an album by Austrian band Erste Allgemeine Verunsicherung. It was published in 1991.

== Track listing ==
1. "Neandertal"
2. "Jambo"
3. "Wer riecht so streng ..."
4. "Die Ufos kommen"
5. "Würger"
6. "Neppo-Nepp"
7. "Hildegard"
8. "Hip-Hop"
9. "Inspektor Tatü"
10. "Erzherzog Jogerl"
11. "Dudelsack-Dudu"
12. "Alk-Parade"

Lyrics: Thomas Spitzer

== Personnel ==
- Klaus Eberhartinger (lead vocals)
- Thomas Spitzer (guitar)
- Eik Breit (bass)
- Nino Holm (keyboards)
- Andy Töfferl (keyboards, vocals)
- Günther Schönberger (saxophone)
- Anders Stenmo (percussion)
