= S.T.S. (band) =

Austrian band

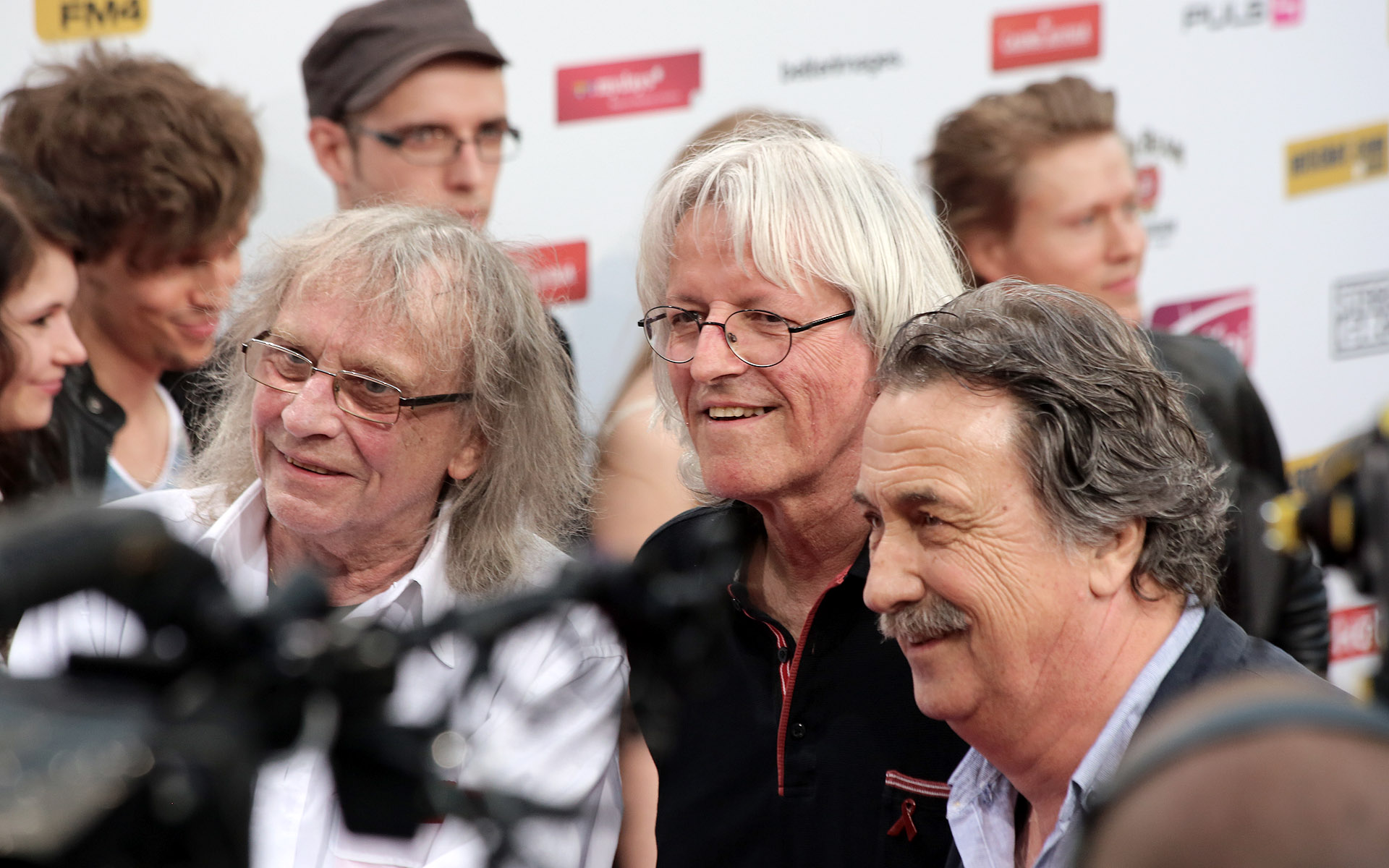
- S.T.S. (Amadeus Austrian Music Awards 2013)

Background information
- Origin: Graz, Austria
- Genres: Pop rock, austropop, folk rock, country rock, country pop, blues
- Years active: 1978-2012
- Members: Gert Steinbäcker; Günter Timischl; Schiffkowitz

S.T.S. (also STS; acronym for "Steinbäcker – Timischl – Schiffkowitz") was a three-member Austropop band from Graz in Austria. Its most famous songs are "Großvater", "Irgendwann bleib i dann dort", "Gö, du bleibst heut Nacht bei mir" and "Fürstenfeld".

The trio was founded in 1978 by Gert Steinbäcker, Günter Timischl and Schiffkowitz (real name Helmut Röhrling). All three members are from Styria, a fact that is repeatedly referenced in the group's songs. The three musicians played acoustic guitar and sang the chorus of their songs in three-part harmony whereas the solo part was sung by the composer with a few exceptions. Instrumentation and vocals reveal influences of bands such as Crosby, Stills and Nash.

S.T.S. recordings have gone gold three times, platinum eleven times, double-platinum three times and quintuple platinum once. The band sold 2.5 million albums. Its fame and popularity is based on loyalty to the trio's own musical concepts and its live performances. S.T.S.'s most popular songs include Fürstenfeld, Da kummt die Sunn (Here Comes the Sun), Großvater (Granddad), Gö, Du bleibst heut Nacht bei mir (Help Me Make It Through the Night), Kalt und kälter (Cold and colder), Mach die Aug’n zu (Close your eyes), Wunder meiner Seligkeit (Wonder of my bliss), Überdosis G’fühl (Overdose of feeling) und Irgendwann bleib i dann dort (One day I'll stay there).

== History ==
=== Founding years ===
The three musicians went their separate ways until 1975 and were mainly active in various bands in Styria and Germany, before they finally came together as a trio. After Gert Steinbäcker and Schiffkowitz had at times formed a loose formation, Günter Timischl finally joined them. A first short public appearance took place in the course of the "Forum Stadtpark" in Graz – a small event to which mainly poets were invited. Soon thereafter, an engagement for a first "real" appearance followed on 4 December 1975, with the trio being complemented by an English bongo player. The first appearances were quite popular, although they were only limited to the surrounding area (Graz, Fürstenfeld, Güssing and Gleisdorf). Nevertheless, after this regional tour they wanted to go their separate ways again and gave their supposed farewell concert in Graz in April 1976.

The following years put the three musicians to the test. Günter Timischl tried unsuccessfully as a soloist and survived until 1976/77, among other things as a window cleaner. He eventually joined the UN troops and worked in a kind of "entertainment company" in Cyprus. However, he did not fail to compose his own songs for a later band. 1978 he returned to his hometown Fürstenfeld.

Gert Steinbäcker returned to Germany in 1976, where he found himself in a personal crisis. Constantly changing odd jobs and the associated musical standstill finally moved him to go back to Styria. There he recorded a single under the pseudonym Stony Becker. The single was titled Matchless Woman (B-side: Catherine) and flopped.

Meanwhile, Schiffkowitz traveled to the United States in the summer of 1976 to conduct a series of interviews with well-known musicians for a radio station. According to his own statement, the excursion made a significant contribution to his personal development, whereby he wanted to "... bring the idols of (his) past down from their pedestal". After three and a half months he returned to Styria, where alternative civilian service was waiting for him. With the material from overseas he also started to write a book. In 1978 the musicians got together again and finally launched "S.T.S.".

At first a few songs were written and everyone got involved and contributed what he had composed in the years in between. Half of the lyrics were written in English before it was decided to use the Styrian dialect of the German language. But the sparse appearances, which in turn were limited to Graz, Gleisdorf and Fürstenfeld, prompted them to take part-time jobs. Timischl met his future wife Lotte, Steinbäcker worked, among other things, as a stage worker and composer for plays for children and young people. Schiffkowitz continued to write his book and worked as a freelance journalist. In 1979 their first single came out, which was entitled Matter of Sex and was composed by Schiffkowitz. The B-side came from Gert Steinbäcker and was titled With You. The project failed, which is why the record company forced them to sing in Italian. The three declined with thanks and finally canceled the contract with the production company.

In 1979 the Erste Allgemeine Verunsicherung also had its first successes. When they were planning a summer tour, S.T.S. played for "E.A.V." for a while. Günter Timischl was also often active for the formation "Opus", which he, in addition to S.T.S., supported musically at numerous concerts. It wasn't until 1980 that the Ariola record company reacted to live demo tapes from S.T.S. and produced the single Da kummt die Sunn, a Schiffkowitz adaptation of the Beatles classic Here Comes the Sun. The back side was the song Geht's Da Guat by Günter Timischl. Da kummt the Sunn was very well received on the radio, but did not sell well. The record company nevertheless decided to make an LP and so the long-playing record Gegenlicht was created by March 1981. With 2,000 copies sold, this was to be regarded as a respectable success, but the breakthrough was still a long time coming.

S.T.S. set out on their own to record their own single, which was titled Automaten-Karl. Also of these only a few hundred were sold, which is why they lived mainly from extensive concert tours. The final separation from E.A.V. followed in order for them to be able to devote themselves entirely to their own projects. During this time the formation had a deep crisis, although the fourth single followed. The contract with Ariola had long been dissolved when the musicians produced the single Irgendwann bleib i dann dort (1983) in a small recording studio in Oberschützen, Burgenland. With 5,000 copies sold, success was still limited. The song only became a hit two years later and was known as the "dropout anthem".

At the beginning of 1984, concrete considerations on the subject of quitting were formulated, with the aim of continuing until the end of the year at the most in the event of failure. During this phase, the band members received a call from the Viennese record company Amadeo, which had become aware of demo tapes that had been sent. They agreed to finance a long-playing record that was recorded in March and April 1984 in Vienna.

At the beginning of May the public was finally presented with the second S.T.S. LP Überdosis G’fühl, of which only 500 were initially produced. On the record are titles like I hab di Leben g'sehn and Das neue Vaterland.

=== Fürstenfeld ===
Just when ten songs had been written for this LP, the record company said that there was enough room for one more song. In discussing the situation, Schiffkowitz recalled a song that the East Styrian musician Josef Jandrisits had composed in 1982 and which was entitled With a Little Help. The song written by Schiffkowitz was rearranged with the consent of Josef Jandrisits and given a German text. The song, which was now called Fürstenfeld, was aimed at Günter Timischl, who is passionate about being and coming to his homeland, and was initially intended as a parody. This Jandrisits-Fürstenfeld has already been part of the concert program of S.T.S. years ago. Fürstenfeld should now be the first single from the new LP. The trio achieved their breakthrough – the LP sold 70,000 copies within a year (platinum), the single even 140,000 copies.

=== Years of success ===
In the same year due to the surging wave of success, Günter Timischl had to part with Opus, for which he had worked as a band musician for years. The last joint appearance took place in Oberwart, Burgenland. From the live recording of this concert, the single Live Is Life resulted, which would go on to sell three million times worldwide in the summer of 1984. Meanwhile, S.T.S. went on to produce a new LP after a sold-out tour, which was titled Grenzlos.

The LP, which was released in 1985, was even more successful in terms of sales than Überdosis G’fühl and was to receive four times platinum. On the record, in addition to the number Kalt und Kälter, was also the title Irgendwann bleib i dann dort, which climbed the Austrian hit parade two years after its creation. The album's success was followed by a sold out autumn tour, with the trio being supported for the first time by keyboardist Ewald Beit, who had already participated in the first recordings. In addition to the record productions and extensive tours, S.T.S. took a creative break for several months.

1986 followed the largest tour to date with 50 concerts, which also took the trio to Germany, Switzerland and Liechtenstein. The fourth LP, Augenblicke, followed in August 1987, and the familiar studio musicians from the previous productions were involved in its creation. After another sold out summer tour, there was following a long two-year break.

The tourless year 1988 was bridged with a live recording titled S.T.S. – Auf Tour, a double album with performances from Graz, Linz and Vienna. The year 1989 did not bring any musical innovations either, but two samplers (Glanzlichter and Gö, du bleibst…), a best-of selection from the four previous albums.

=== The 1990s ===
At the end of 1989, S.T.S. slowly got going again. Gert Steinbäcker worked on a solo album, while Günter Timischl occasionally appeared with the "Magic '69 Reunion"; a new edition of the band Magic 69, to which he had belonged until 1973. The sixth S.T.S. album was therefore not long in coming, was given the title Jeder Tag zählt and was accompanied by an extensive tour. The musical support also grew; In addition to Ewald Beit on the keyboard, the German drummer Gerhard Wennemuth, who was voted the best drummer living in Austria in 1984, has been a constant companion of S.T.S. In addition, Erich Buchebner rounded off the band on the bass guitar. The typical work rhythm of S.T.S. now started to set in. A record production was followed by a long tour, which was followed by a break from work lasting several months. In 1990 the album Jeder Tag zählt with the single Drago was released. In June 1992 the band released their tenth album in total, Auf a Wort. Above all, the band's personal commitment against right-wing extremism becomes clear here, culminating in the song Und es ist so schön da, in which Schiffkowitz refers to the events in concentration camps. In 1993, which was supposed to be an album-free year according to the typical work rhythm, the band came up with a surprise. S.T.S. took the Styrian state exhibition as an occasion and set poems by the Styrian writer Peter Rosegger to music at the request of the organizer. The album was given the simple name Rosegger.

After three years without a "real" S.T.S. album, they returned in 1995. For the first time since 1981 they went back to a Styrian recording studio owned by the "Opus" guitarist Ewald Pfleger. The result was the album Zeit, which was followed by a tour of 50 concerts. This time, too, the large concert halls filled up and more people came to the open airs than ever before. Until then, this was the most successful S.T.S. autumn tour with around 150,000 concert-goers in Austria and Germany. The finale in the spring and summer of 1996 was a series of six concerts, in Germany they appeared together with Pur and Toto, in Austria with Sting and Toto. In the same year, the best-of CD Die größten Hits aus 15 Jahren was released. As expected, a year-long hiatus followed, during which time they worked on a new album, which was released in 1998 under the name Volle Kraft. In the course of the subsequent tour they played almost without exception on large stages such as the Wiener Stadthalle and four times at the Circus Krone in Munich. In the same year the best-of-CD Master Series was released. Volle Kraft should be the last studio production for many years. S.T.S. rather concentrated on their large-scale tours, whose success, in contrast to the media presence, did not want to ebb.

=== Since 2000 ===
On 31 August 2007, another album Neuer Morgen (A new morning), was released containing 14 new songs, of which Ende nie (No end) came out early as a promo-Single. The response of the radio stations was very reserved; the song's topic, which refers to the conflict between Islam and the western world, must have sat too uncomfortably. Lyric lines such as "you western, decadent asses" or "mufti" were among the reasons for Styria's local radio station refusing to play the song. In a newspaper interview, the station's manager responsible for music selection stated that this song did not represent the "positive attitude towards life" that Radio Styria wanted to convey.

In 2012 S.T.S. performed its farewell tour. As a final token of appreciation, all three members of the band, Schiffkowitz, Timischl and Steinbäcker, received Decorations of Honour for Services to the Republic of Austria. In July 2014 the trio announced that they would no longer perform together. The stated reasons were health problems of Günter Timischl.

In 2021, S.T.S. made a guest appearance on the Opus farewell tour, with all three band members performing together on stage for two nights. It was the first joint appearance after nine years. At first Steinbäcker started alone on stage with Großvater and was then completed by Schiffkowitz and Timischl to play the song Fürstenfeld together. All three musicians do not want the performances to be understood as a comeback, nor do they currently plan to be on stage together again in the future.

== Discography ==
year	title	chart			notes
year	title	DE	AT	CH	notes
1981	Gegenlicht	—	—	—	sales: 25,000+
1984	Überdosis G’fühl	—	1	—	sales: 100,000+
1985	Grenzenlos	—	1	—	sales: 250,000+
1987	Augenblicke	—	1	—	sales: 50,000+
1990	Jeder Tag zählt	—	2	—	sales: 50,000+
1992	Auf a Wort	—	2	—	sales: 50,000+
1993	Rosegger	—	18	—	together with Christian Kolonowits
1995	Zeit	—	1	—	sales: 50,000+
1998	Volle Kraft	—	2	—	sales: 50,000+
2003	Herzverbunden	—	1	—	nominated for Amadeus Austrian Music Awards sales: 30,000+
2007	Neuer Morgen	—	1	—	sales: 20,000+

Note: no chart data for Switzerland for 1981 available
