= Liebe, Tod & Teufel =

Studio album by Erste Allgemeine Verunsicherung
- Released: October 26, 1987
- Genre: Austropop
- Length: 40:47
- Label: EMI Columbia Austria
- Producer: Peter Müller

Erste Allgemeine Verunsicherung chronology
| Geld oder Leben! (1985) | Liebe, Tod & Teufel (1987) | Neppomuk's Rache (1990) |

Liebe, Tod & Teufel (Love, Death & the Devil) is a 1987 album by the Austrian pop band Erste Allgemeine Verunsicherung.

== Background ==
After the great success of Geld oder Leben! (Your Money or Your Life!) and its singles, the band was working on a new album. Liebe, Tod & Teufel was released on 26 October 1987. The single Küss die Hand, schöne Frau was released on 17 October that year. In 1988, the singles An der Copacabana and Burli were released. On 18 February 1988, the band started touring to promote the album.

== Track list ==
| No. | Title | English translation | Length |
|---|---|---|---|
| 1. | "Drei verliebte Pinguine (1)" | "Three Penguins in Love (1)" | 0:35 |
| 2. | "Liebe, Tod und Teufel" | "Love, Death and the Devil" | 5:02 |
| 3. | "Küss die Hand, schöne Frau" | "Kiss the Hand, Beautiful Woman" | 4:10 |
| 4. | "Der Tod" | "Mr. Death" | 5:41 |
| 5. | "An der Copacabana" | "At the Copacabana" | 4:34 |
| 6. | "Yes, That's Jazz" | Yes, That's Jazz | 0:19 |
| 7. | "Tarzan und Jane" | "Tarzan and Jane" | 4:10 |
| 8. | "Burli" | "Boy" | 4:03 |
| 9. | "Auf der Nepperbahn" | "On the Nepperbahn" | 2:22 |
| 10. | "Sandlerkönig Eberhard" | "Eberhard, king of the beggars" | 5:42 |
| 11. | "Ohr-Troubles (Prinz Charles)" | "Ear Troubles (Prince Charles)" | 3:34 |
| 12. | "Drei verliebte Pinguine (2)" | Three Penguins in Love (2) | 0:35 |

== Personnel ==
Erste Allgemeine Verunsicherung
- Klaus Eberhartinger – lead vocals
- Thomas Spitzer – guitar, vocals, co-lead vocals on "Der Tod"
- Nino Holm – keyboards, bass, programming, backing vocals
- Eik Breit – bass, backing vocals
- Anders Stenmo – drums, programming
- Mario Bottazzi – backing vocals
- Günter Schönberger – backing vocals

Additional personnel

- Peter Kolbert – drums
- Peter Müller – programming, production
- Peter Skrepek – programming

== Contents ==
The cover of the album shows a penguin who is popular amongst women. It also features "Teil 1" (Part 1) on the cover, with Verunsicherung from their name in big red letters adorning the cover (Erste Allgemeine appear below in brackets). This is an illustration of the song Küss die Hand, schöne Frau. In Liebe, Tod und Teufel the attitude of the Catholic Church against AIDS and homosexuals is attacked, while Burli contains a biting satire of nuclear power. However, some songs poke fun at Prince Charles' large ears (Ohr-Troubles).

== Reception ==
The album reached #1 in Austria and Switzerland, for eight and two weeks respectively. It peaked at #3 in Germany.

== Charts ==
=== Weekly charts ===
| Chart (1987–1988) | Peak position |
|---|---|
| Austrian Albums (Ö3 Austria) | 1 |
| German Albums (Offizielle Top 100) | 3 |
| Swiss Albums (Schweizer Hitparade) | 1 |

=== Year-end charts ===
| Chart (1988) | Position |
|---|---|
| Austrian Albums (Ö3 Austria) | 3 |
| German Albums (Offizielle Top 100) | 5 |
| Swiss Albums (Schweizer Hitparade) | 2 |
