= Spitalo Fatalo =

Studio album by Erste Allgemeine Verunsicherung
- Released: September 23, 1983
- Recorded: 1982–1983
- Studios: Sound Mill Studio, Düsentriebstudio, Tonstudio Heinz, Magic Sound Studio
- Label: EMI
- Producers: Erste Allgemeine Verunsicherung, Wilfried Scheutz

Erste Allgemeine Verunsicherung chronology
Café Passé (1981)	Spitalo Fatalo (1983)	À la Carte (1984)

Spitalo Fatalo was the third album to be released by Austrian band Erste Allgemeine Verunsicherung. It was released in 1983 in Germany and reissued a few times for a few other countries and formats.

- Originally released on vinyl in Germany in 1983, catalogue number EMI Electrola 1333121
- Reissued on vinyl in Germany in 1991, catalogue number EMI Electrola 1333121, weisses Label
- Reissued on CD in Germany 1988 DE, catalogue number EMI Electrola 7900712
- Issued in The Netherlands on CD in 1991, catalogue number EMI Electrola 7900712
- Issued on cassette in Austria in 1991, catalogue number EMI Electrola 7900714

The track entitled "Tanz Tanz Tanz" does not relate to the song which features on James Last's album "Sing Mit James Last 7"

== Track listing ==
1. Hallo Hallo
2. Tanz Tanz Tanz
3. Sofa
4. Balkan-Boogie
5. I hob des G'fühl
6. Afrika - Ist der Massa gut bei Kassa
7. Stolzer Falke
8. Alpenrap
9. Es wird Heller
10. Total verunsichert
11. Spitalo Finalo

== Personnel ==
EAV

- Thomas Spitzer: guitars, vocals
- Eik Breit: bass, backing vocals, lead vocals on "Es wird Heller"
- Nino Holm: keyboards, bass, backing vocals
- Anders Stenmo: drums, backing vocals
- Klaus Eberhartinger: lead vocals on "Tanz Tanz Tanz", "Balkan-Boogie", "Afrika - Ist der Massa gut bei Kassa" and "Alpenrap"
- Mario Bottazzi: piano, lead vocals on "Hallo Hallo", "Sofa", "Stolzer Falke" and "Spitalo Finalo"
- Günther Schönberger: saxophone, backing vocals

Additional personnel

- Gert Steinbäcker: lead vocals on "Total verunsichert"
- Günter Timischl: lead vocals on "I hob des G'fühl"
- Wilfried Scheutz: handclaps
- Andi Beit: keyboards
- Erich Buchebner: bass
- Hossein Rastegar: drums
- Siegfried Ritter: drums
- Peter Szammer: drums
- Boris Bukowski: snare drum
- Gottfried Neumeister: trumpet
- Franz Tieber: tuba
- Martin Tieber: trombone
- Günter Meinhart: marimba
- Gottfried Jesernik: backing vocals

== Singles ==
- Total verunsichert was released in 1982 in Austria only and only on 7 inch. Tanz Tanz Tanz appeared on the B side. Catalogue number UN-Platte 45002.
- Alpen Rap was released on 7 inch only in Austria, however a 7-inch and a 12-inch were released in Germany. The Austrian 7 inch was on catalogue number EMI Columbia 12C 006 33310. The German 7 inch was on catalogue number EMI Electrola 1333107 and the German 12 inch was released on catalogue number EMI Electrola 1333106. All three issues were in 1983. All three issues featured I hob des G'fühl as the B side, however the German 12 inch featured Alpen-Rap (Mega-Alm-Mix) instead of the original Alpen-Rap track.
- A slight variation of Alpen Rap was released on 7 inch in Germany only in 1983 and it was called Alp-Rapp. It was released on catalogue number EMI 1333227 and featured Tanz Tanz Tanz on the B side.
- Afrika - Ist der Massa gut bei Kassa was issued as a 7 inch in Germany only on catalogue number EMI Columbia 1333137. It featured Stolzer Falke on the B side.
