= MisSiss =

Austrian musician (born 1976)

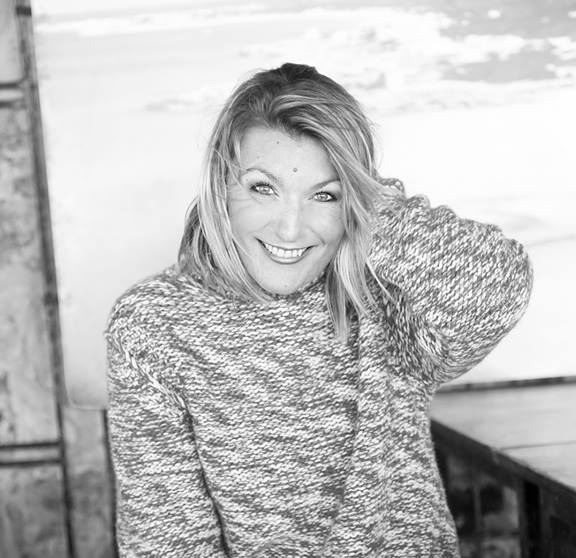
Sissy Handler (2016)

Sissy Handler (born 6 May 1976 in Graz) is an Austrian singer, songwriter, vocal coach and producer. She is best known under her stage name of MisSiss. Her music is mainly pop, soul, R&B and gospel.

== Life and work ==
Sissy Handler comes from a musical family. After obtaining her certificate of secondary education from Fürstenfeld high school, she attended the tourism college in Bad Gleichenberg. She then sang in several pop, soul and blues bands before taking classical voice training with Margarita Kyriaki-Wagner and additional singing lessons with Romana Carén, Dean Kaelin, Mary Ann Kehler, Wendy Parr and Leon Bérrange. She subsequently developed her special interest in black music, especially in soul, R&B and gospel. Her first musical role as Sister Robert Ann in Nunsense was followed by further projects. In 2006, she founded the Soulistics, the band with which she still performs her own songs in full orchestration. She also reached the finals in the 2008 Ö3 sound check with her single Diva backed by her band Soulistics. The album of the same name, launched in the summer of 2012, had been planned beforehand, and production of the album had already started. At the same time, she was also singing with the gospel/soul/pop ensemble Gospel and More, a group she has been singing with since 2006. Together with Ingrid Diem, she founded Voicedimensions – vocal training and coaching for aspiring professionals the following year. In 2015, together with Veronika Fiegl, Handler founded the platform You're the Voice, a workshop series for aspiring singers and professional singers.

Her collaboration with the Argentine producer Ariel Gato resulted in the album Sissita's Soul Tangos with Fernando Suárez Paz (Astor Piazzolla’s first violinist) and Gabriel Senanes (former conductor of the Teatro Colón). This was followed by live tours with these Argentine musicians, in 2010 in South America, and in 2011 in Germany and Austria. Sissita's Soul Tangos has been broadcast on over eighty German radio stations to date. At the end of 2011, she sang as a member of the gospel quartet Gospel & More the Coca Cola Truck Tour and was seen as a gospel singer in the Christmas film "Weihnachtsengel küsst man nicht". She brought out her second album Soulistics in the summer of 2012. In 2014, the single He's So Special became Radio Wien’s summer hit of the year.

She also works as a singer and songwriter with colleagues like Eva Maria Marold, for whom she wrote the songs for the album Ziemlich 30. She also worked as a composer, texter and singer with Christoph Brüx.

== Discography ==
- 2011: "Sissita's Soul Tangos", album, with Ariel Gato.
- 2011: “Nightmares”, single and music video
- 2011: “A New Life”, single
- 2011: “A New Life Remix” of club jumpers, single
- 2012: “Soulistics”, album, with Florian Hirschmann, Hannes Breitschädel and Ariel Gato.
- 2012: "Diva", single and music video
- 2013: "Diva Remix" remix of Bart & Baker, single on "Electro Swing" compilation
- 2013: "It's Christmas Time", single
- 2014: "He's So Special", single
- 2016: "This love is golden", Single, Sealight/Tap-Water Records
- 2017: „Do you wanna marry me?", Single, Sealight/Tap-Water Records
- 2017: „Colors of Love", Album, Sealight/Tap-Water Records

== Films ==
- 2011: "Weihnachtsengel küsst man nicht", (ORF/ZDF/ARD)

== Other performances ==
- 2007: Danube Island Festival with Gospel and More on the World Music Stage.
- 2010: South America Tour with Sissita's Soul Tangos (Argentina, Uruguay)
- 2013: Classic World Hits Tour in China

== Awards ==
- 2011: Short list for Grammy Awards with "Sissita's Soul Tangos"
- 2012: Recommendation for Grammy Awards with "Soulistics"
