= Andy Töfferl =

Austrian multi-instrumentalist, actor and entertainer

Andreas "Andy" Töfferl (24 July 1955 in Wolfsberg, Carinthia; - 5 May 2012 in Graz, Styria) was an Austrian multi-instrumentalist, actor and entertainer. From 1990 until 2001 he was a member of the Austrian band Erste Allgemeine Verunsicherung and amongst others was a colleague of Franz Zettl.

== Life ==
Töfferl completed an apprenticeship as a commercial employee. Even as a teenager, he mastered several musical instruments. In the 1980s he founded the Andy J. Sam Phoenix Gang and opened the Sam-Sportstudio in Graz.

In 1986, Töfferl got married and divorced two years later. He had a daughter from this marriage.

In the summer of 1990 he had replaced the Erste Allgemeine Verunsicherung keyboardist Mario Bottazzi, who had left for personal reasons. He was best known for his acting roles, which he performed for the first time on the Neppomuk tour in 1991.

== Death ==
On the morning of 5 May 2012, Töfferl suffered a severe heart attack while watching television due to a burst aneurysm and he fell into a coma. He died in the circle of his family in LKH-Universitätsklinikum Graz (LKH-University Hospital Graz). He was buried on 12 May 2012 in his last place of residence - Fernitz in Styria.
