= Klaus Eberhartinger =

Austrian singer and television presenter

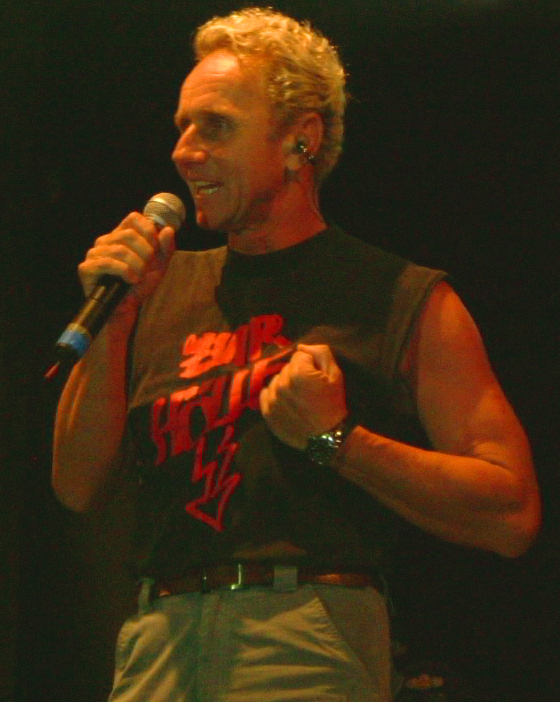
Klaus Eberhartinger performing at an EAV concert in 2004

Klaus Eberhartinger (born 12 June 1950 in Gmunden, Upper Austria) is an Austrian singer and television presenter.

Eberhartinger grew up and graduated in Braunau am Inn in 1968. He then lived in the United States of America for a year before he began his medical studies in Graz. It was in Graz, where he met the sister of Thomas Spitzer, who had founded the band Erste Allgemeine Verunsicherung (E.A.V.). Eberhartinger went on to interrupt his studies, take on various jobs in Munich, and buy a Land Rover to travel throughout Africa. He returned to Austria and resumed his studies in Graz until 1981 when he joined Thomas Spitzer's band Erste Allgemeine Verunsicherung and played an important role in paving its road to success.

In 1985, Klaus Eberhartinger's son, Christopher was born, who went on to study in Barcelona at a business school. Klaus Eberhartinger is still close to his mother and she takes care of his financial affairs. Since the mid-90s Eberhartinger usually spends half of the year in Kenya, where Thomas Spitzer owns a house.

In addition to several CD releases and tours of Erste Allgemeine Verunsicherung, Eberhartinger occasionally played the role of Gailtalerin in the stage play "Der Watzmann Ruft" ("The Watzmann calls") The production was on tour for two years.

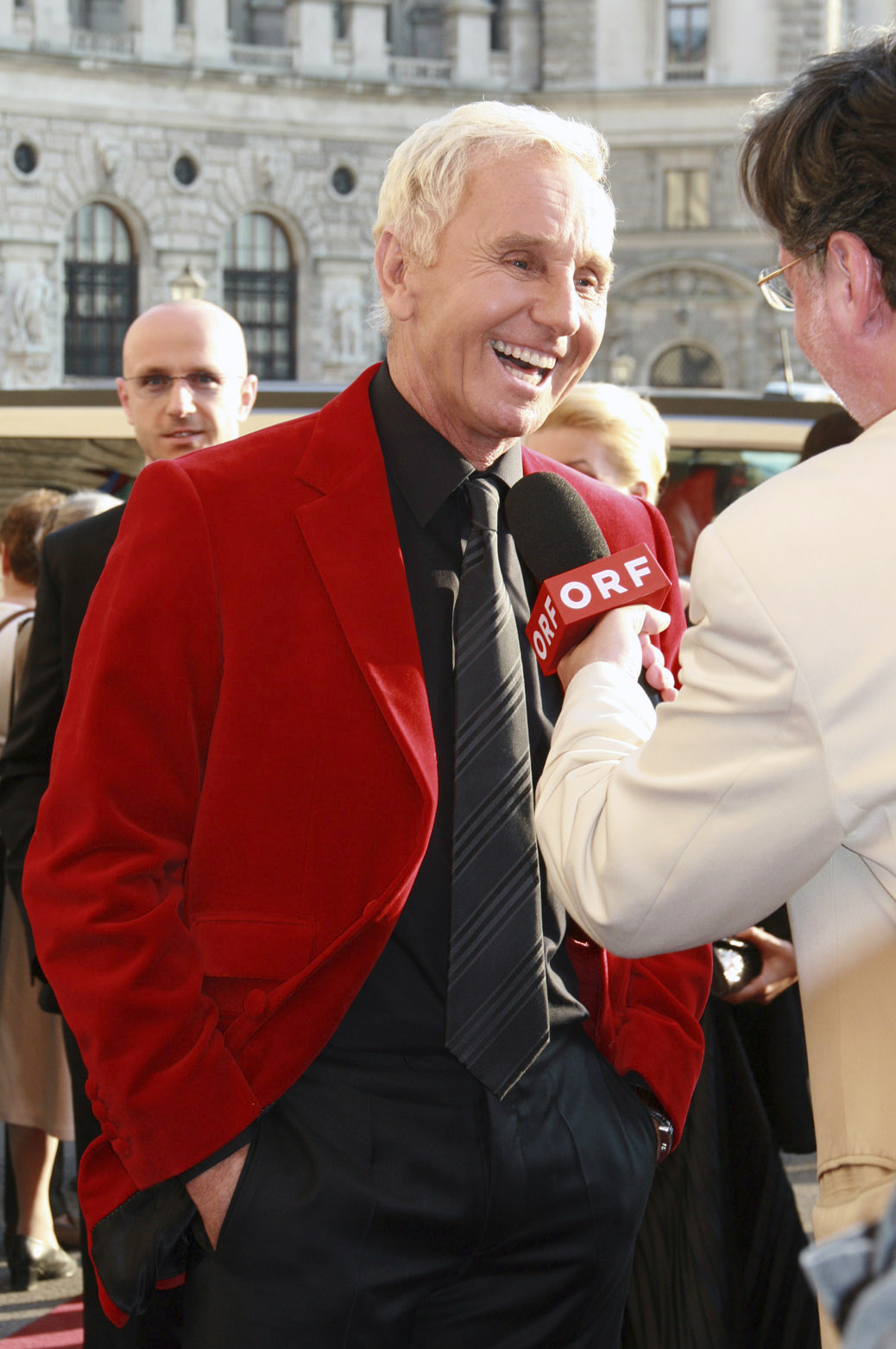
Klaus Eberhartinger in Vienna, 2009

In the third season (2007) of "Dancing Stars", the Austrian version of "Dancing with the Stars", he won first place with his dance partner Kelly Kainz, despite the fact he had broken a rib during training. Shortly after, he took over hosting the ATV show "Quiz Champion". On 10 March 2008, he published his first book entitled "Sex, Lachs & Rock 'n' Roll" (Sex, Salmon and Rock 'n' Roll). Eberhartinger was co-host during season 4 of Dancing Stars, and continually has been since season 6 of the show.
