= Der Alpen-Rap =

Song by Erste Allgemeine Verunsicherung

Single cover

Der Alpen-Rap (The Alpine Rap) is a comedy rap song by Erste Allgemeine Verunsicherung.

It was released in 1983 and composed by Spitzer/Holm/Eberhartinger/Breit/Schönberger. The lyrics are written by Thomas Spitzer.

Der Alpen-Rap was released on 7 inch only in Austria, however a 7-inch and a 12-inch were released in Germany. The Austrian 7 inch was on catalogue number EMI Columbia 12C 006 33310. The German 7 inch was on catalogue number EMI Electrola 1333107 and the German 12 inch was released on catalogue number EMI Electrola 1333106. All three issues were in 1983. All three issues featured I hob des G'fühl as the B side, however the German 12 inch featured Alpen-Rap (Mega-Alm-Mix) instead of the original Alpen-Rap track. A slight variation (in Swedish) of Der Alpen-Rap was released on 7 inch in Sweden in 1983 and it was called Alp-Rap. It was released on catalogue number EMI 1333227 and featured Tanz Tanz Tanz on the B side. In 1988 Alp-Rap got released on Kann den Schwachsinn Sünde sein.

The single reached number 6 in the Austrian singles chart and number 12 in the Swiss singles chart.
