= Fürstenfeld (song) =

Single by S.T.S.

from the album Überdosis G'fühl
- B-side: "Manchesmal"
- Released: 1984
- Genre: Pop rock; neue volksmusik; country; austropop
- Length: 5:23
- Songwriter(s): Schiffkowitz

S.T.S. singles chronology
"Fahr auf's Land mit mir" (1984)	"Fürstenfeld" (1984)	"Überdosis G'fühl" (1984)

"Fürstenfeld", named after the town of the same name in Styria is a song recorded in 1984 by Austrian pop rock group S.T.S. It reached the top of the Austrian Charts in 1984.

The song's lyrics are about the singer feeling homesick for his hometown Fürstenfeld, after having commercially failed and not being able to put up with the habits in Austria's capital Vienna.
