= À la Carte (Erste Allgemeine Verunsicherung album) =

A la Carte

Studio album by Erste Allgemeine Verunsicherung
- Released: November 1984
- Recorded: 1984
- Label: EMI Columbia
- Producer: Peter Müller

Erste Allgemeine Verunsicherung chronology
Spitalo Fatalo (1983)	A la Carte (1984)	Geld oder Leben! (1985)

A la Carte is the fourth album to be released by Austrian band Erste Allgemeine Verunsicherung (EAV) in 1984.

A la Carte is quite a well known French expression (meaning "according to the card") which is used worldwide. The album cover is a satirical take on this, as it shows a green pig's head, wearing headphones and eating a vinyl disc.

This album was released a few times in Germany and The Netherlands.

Released on vinyl in The Netherlands on catalogue number EMI Columbia 1333421 Reissued on vinyl in The Netherlands, in 1986 on catalogue number EMI Columbia/Fame 1576641 Released on cassette tape in Germany in 1984 on catalogue number EMI Columbia 1333424 Reissued on cassette tape in Germany in 1986 on catalogue number EMI Columbia/Fame 1576644, on the same catalogue number the tape was released in The Netherlands in 1991.

The album was released in Germany on CD in 1988 on catalogue number EMI Columbia/Fame 7900722. The same catalogue number was used for the Dutch CD release in 1991.

== Track listing ==
- All Lyrics by Thomas Spitzer except "Schweine-Funk" by Thomas Spitzer and Klaus Eberhartinger. All Music by Erste Allgemeine Verunsicherung.
1. "Wir jetten" – 3:40
2. "Go, Karli go" – 3:42
3. "Schweinefunk" – 3:49
4. "Oh Bio Mio" – 3:52
5. "Die Intellektuellen" – 4:10
6. "Liebelei" – 3:42
7. "Aloahe" – 4:08
8. "Guru" – 3:04
9. "Heavy-Metal-Pepi" – 3:31
10. "Knieweich" – 4:42

== Singles ==
A stand-alone single was released in 1984 called "Die Braut und der Matrose", released on 7 inch and in Austria on Catalogue number EMI Columbia 1333337. Although this song isn't on the album, it is actually a variation of the album title "Aloahe". The B side featured a variation of this track called "Version Mandy und die Rehleins" (Mandy and Deer Flax Version).

Again in 1984, on 7 inch and in Austria only, "Go Karli Go" was released on catalogue number EMI Columbia 1333457. B side featured "Wir jetten".

"Schweine-Funk" was released on Austrian only 7 inch in 1984. Catalogue number was EMI Columbia 1333467. Liebelei was on the B side. Strangely enough, Liebelei also featured on an Austrian promo 7 inch (again Austrian only) and it had "Schweine-Funk" on its B-side.

In 1985 "Liebelei" was released again on Austrian only 7 inch on catalogue number EMI Columbia 1333477. This time it featured "Die Intellektuellen" on the B side.

== Personnel ==
=== Erste Allgemeine Verunsicherung ===
- Klaus Eberhartinger: lead vocals
- Thomas Spitzer: guitars, vocals
- Nino Holm: keyboards, backing vocals
- Eik Breit: bass, backing vocals, lead vocals on "Knieweich"
- Anders Stenmo: drums
- Mario Bottazzi: keyboards, lead vocals on "Die Intellektuellen" and "Heavy Metal Pepi"
- Günther Schönberger: backing vocals

=== Additional personnel ===
- Peter Müller: lead vocals on "Liebelei"
- Schiffkowitz: backing vocals
- Ingrid Klausnitzer: backing vocals

== Production ==
  - As noted in booklet
- Arranged by Nino Holm
- Produced, recorded and mixed by Peter Muller.
