= Riegersburg Castle =

Building in Riegersburg, Austria

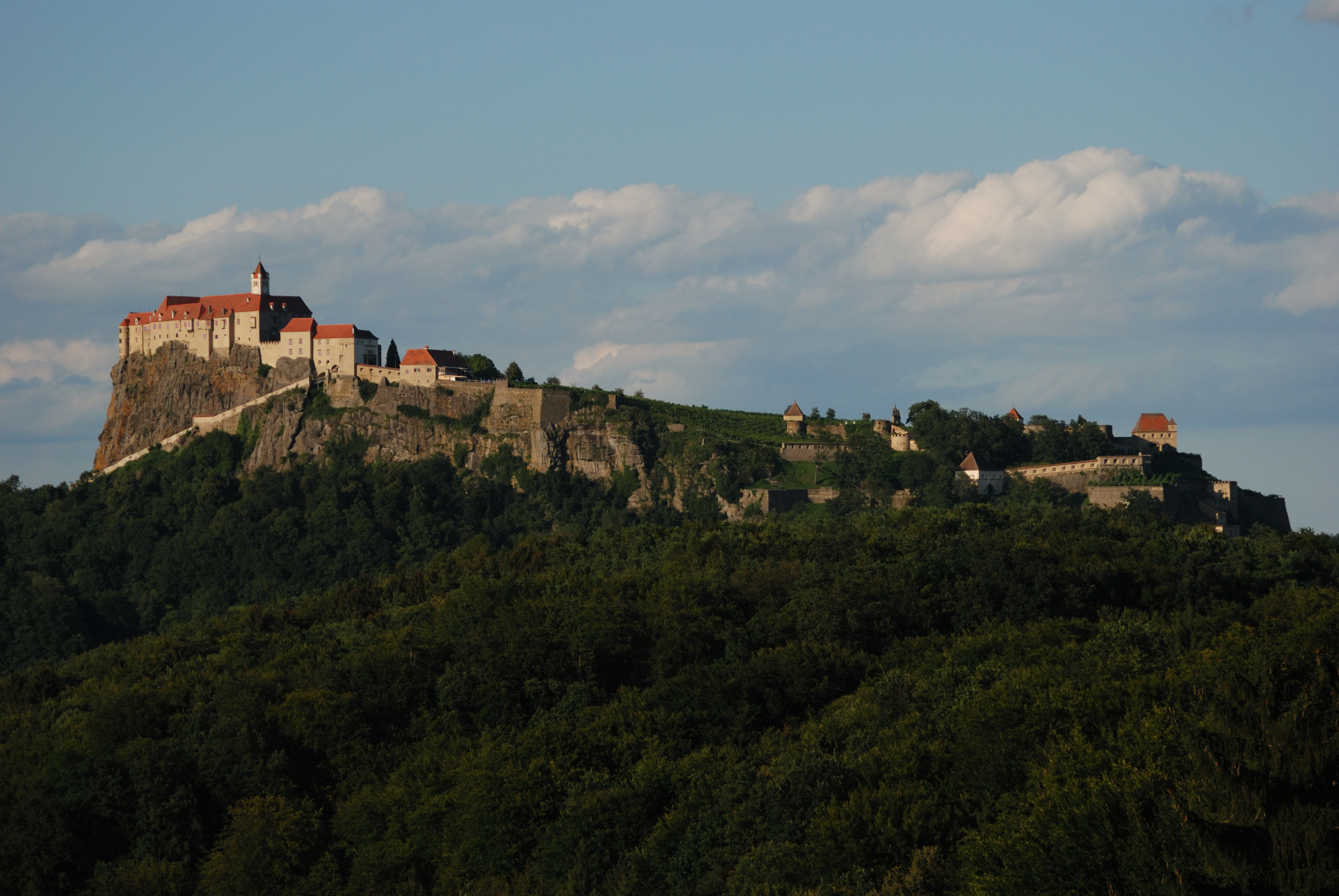
- Riegersburg Castle
- Interactive map of the Riegersburg Castle area

General information
- Status: Completed
- Type: Hill castle
- Location: Riegersburg, 8333 Riegersburg, Austria
- Coordinates: 47°00′17″N 15°55′57″E
- Elevation: 482 m (1,581 ft)
- Construction started: prior to 1138
- Owner: Princely Family of Liechtenstein

Website
- https://www.dieriegersburg.at/en/

Riegersburg Castle is a medieval castle standing on an extinct volcano above the town of Riegersburg in the Austrian state of Styria. The castle is owned by the Princely Family of Liechtenstein and contains a museum with changing exhibitions. Riegersburg Castle stands at an elevation of 450 m (1,480 ft).

== Location ==
The castle was built on a hill that was once an ancient volcano. The hill is the remains of the solidified molten interior, a volcanic neck of a large stratovolcano that probably became extinct two or so million years ago, like other similar hills in north-central Europe. The peak is at 482 meters above sea level. The ancient basalt of the hill was used to build the castle.

== History ==
People have been living in the area around Riegersburg for a few thousand years. A large village was founded in the 9th century B.C. with 300 people living here. Later, from 15 B.C. until 476 A.D. the region was part of the Roman Empire. In the 3rd and 9th century Bavarians immigrated and Hungarians invaded from the East. It was the beginning of a long time of armed conflicts. The history of the castle begins in the year 1122. The first knight who is known to have lived there is Rudiger von Hohenberg. Over the centuries the castle had many different owners, but only few played an important role. Among the later owners is the family of the Walseer who had feud with the sovereign of Styria in 1415. The Lords of Graben auf Kornberg appear as Wallseer administrators in Gleichenberg in the 14th and 15th centuries. The most important owner was the baroness Katharina Elisabeth von Wechsler, who married Galler and who was known as Gallerin. Between 1637 and 1653 she finished the castle, making it one of the biggest and strongest castles in the country. It is surrounded by 3 kilometres (2 mi) of walls with 5 gates and 2 trenches and it contains 108 rooms. In the 17th century the border with the Ottoman Empire was sometimes only 20 to 25 km away from the castle and the area was troubled by conflicts with the Turks and Hungarians. The castle was a safe place for the people nearby, sometimes offering refuge inside its walls for a few thousand. Lady Galler married three times and had one daughter who married a Count Purgstall. The castle passed to the Purgstall family, who died out in 1817. In 1822, the castle was bought by Sovereign Johann Josef von Liechtenstein. It has belonged to the von Liechtenstein family until the present day. The castle was taken by the 10th Guards Rifle Division of Soviet forces advancing towards Graz on 8 May 1945.

== Museum ==
The castle is owned by the Princely Family of Liechtenstein, who live in a house in the town of Riegersburg. The castle serves as a museum with 25 out of the 108 rooms open to tourists. Sixteen of the rooms show the history of Riegersburg Castle and nine deal with witches and sorcerers.

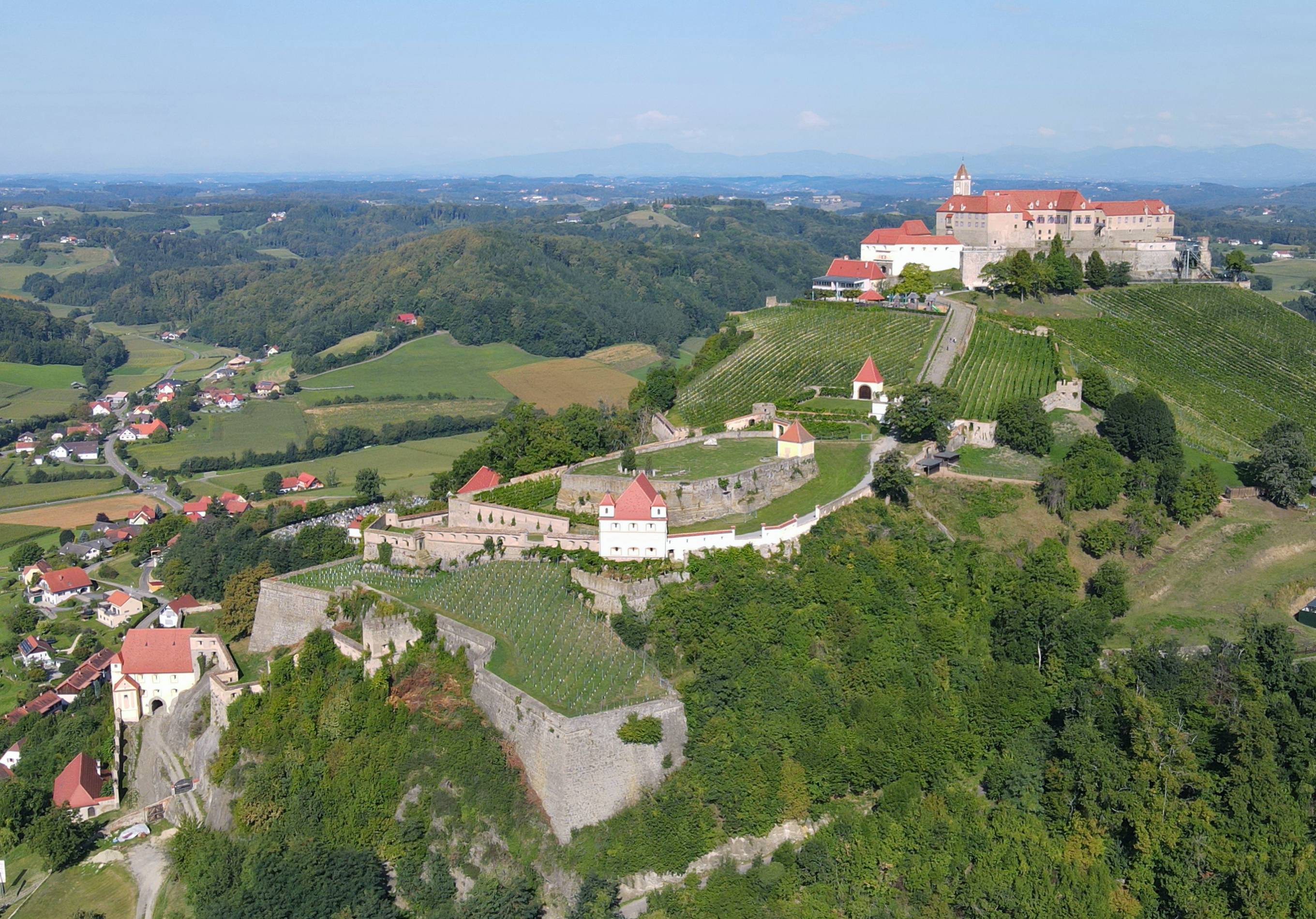
Entire complex of the Riegersburg Castle

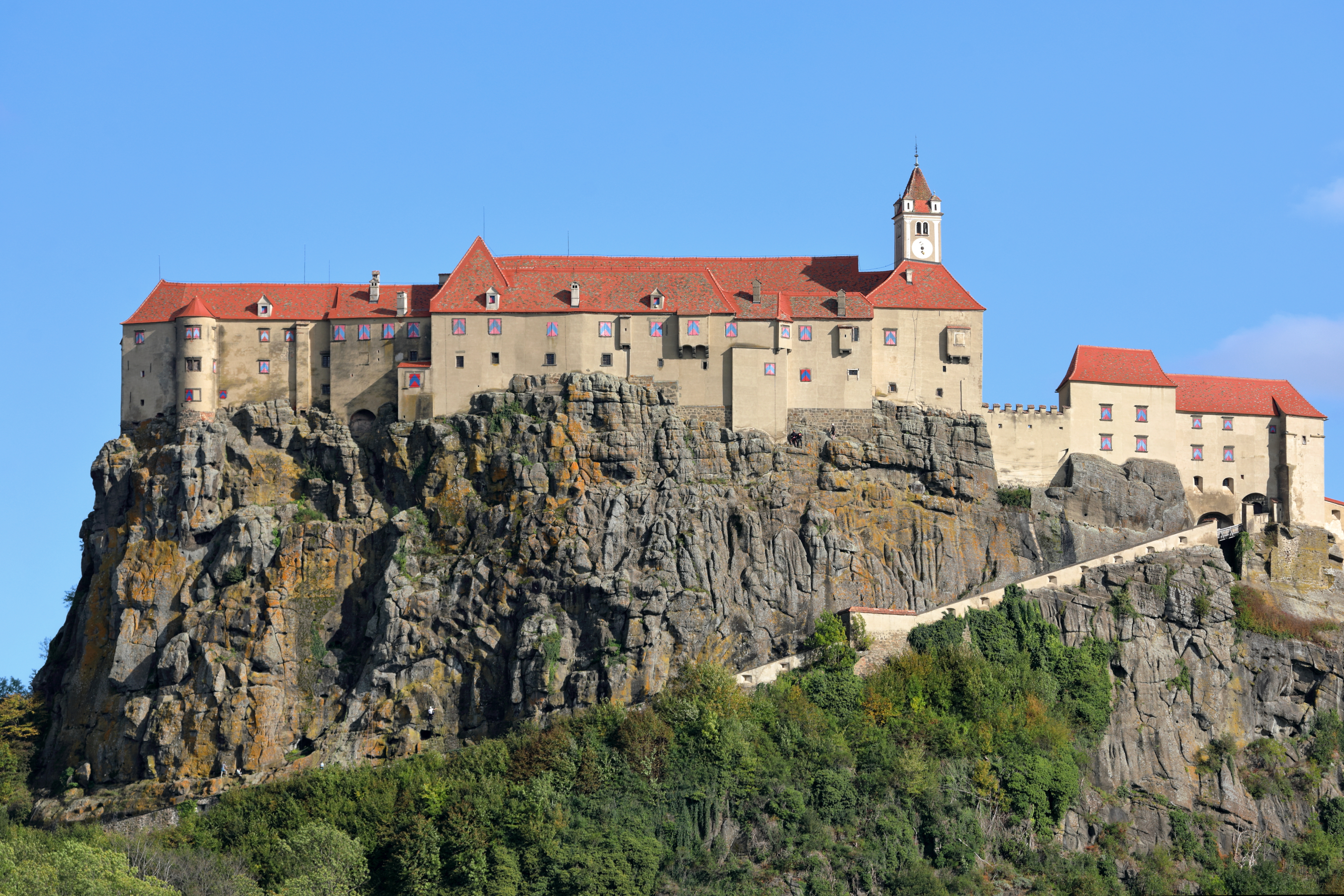
Palace complex of Riegersburg Castle

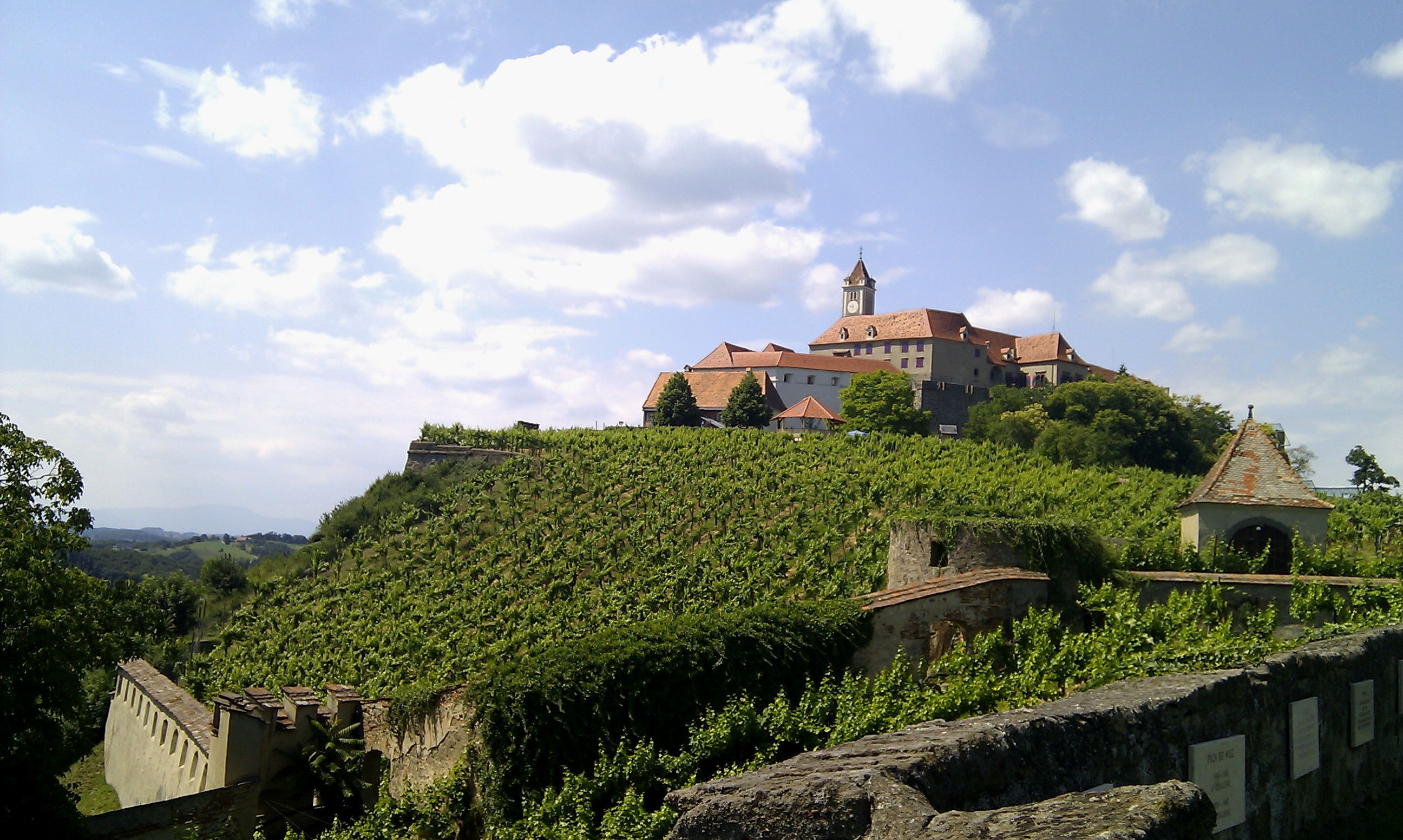
Vineyards on the top of the fortified hill, surrounding the castle proper

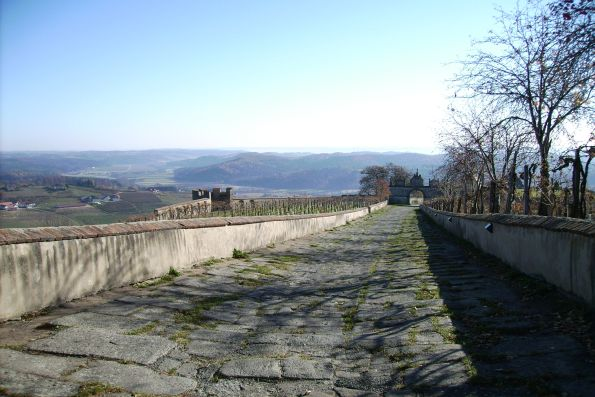
Footpath leading to the castle

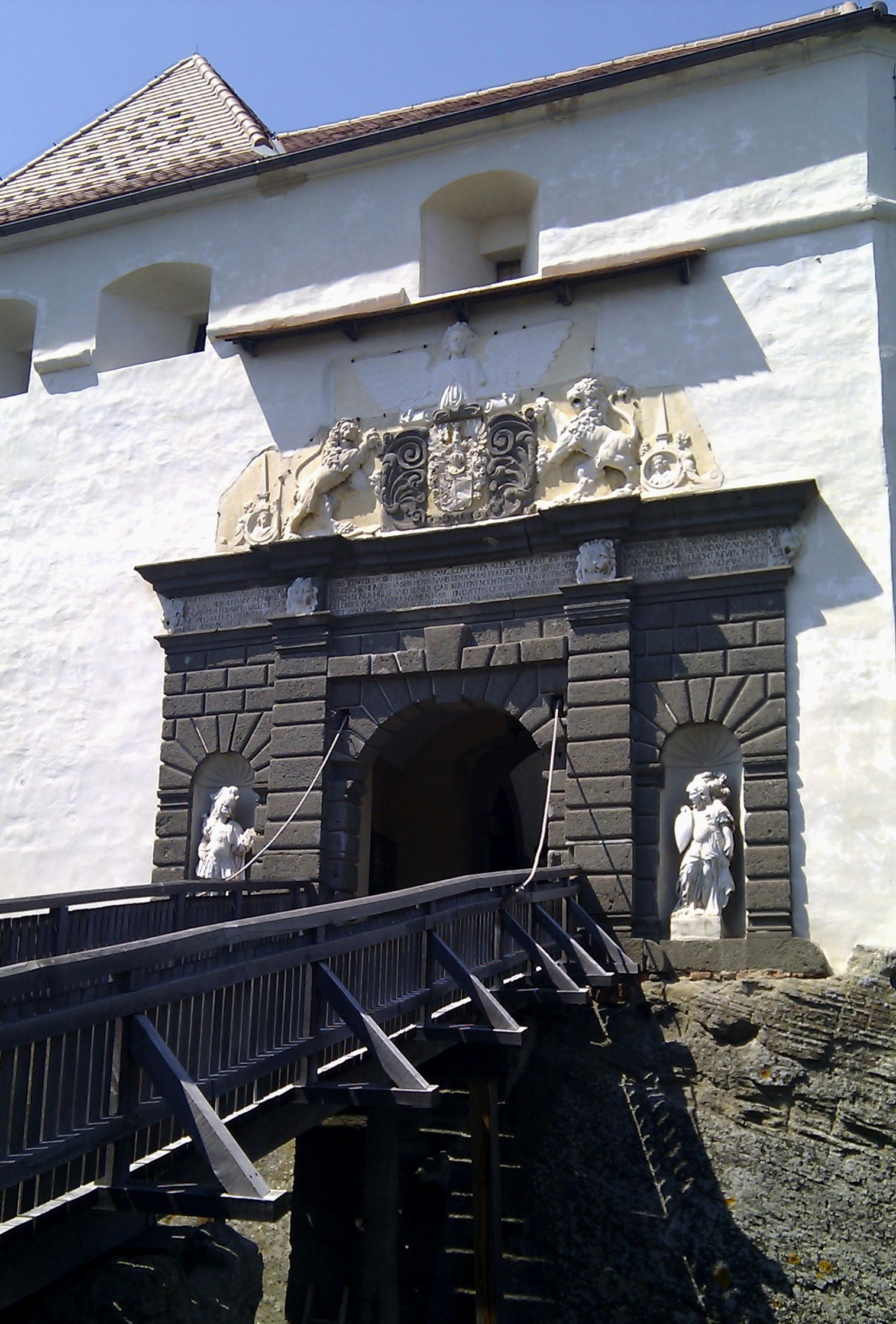
Wenzel gate, the main entrance (1653)
