= 1. Allgemeine Verunsicherung =

Studio album by Erste Allgemeine Verunsicherung
- Released: October 1978
- Recorded: September 1978
- Studio: Cloud One Sound Recording Studio
- Genre: Pop rock
- Label: EMI-Columbia
- Producer: Wilfried Scheutz

Erste Allgemeine Verunsicherung chronology
1. Allgemeine Verunsicherung; (1978)	Café Passé (1981)

1. Allgemeine Verunsicherung is the first album from the Austrian band Erste Allgemeine Verunsicherung. It is actually self-titled, since cardinal numbers followed by a full stop become ordinal numbers: "1." in German translates as "first" as opposed to the number one.

The album is mainly in German, although some of the titles are in English. As the band had changed its members, the material on this album differs considerably from the music the band later went on to produce.

The album was released only in Austria in 1978 under catalogue number EMI Columbia 12C 054-33230. Because only 1800 records were released, original copies are difficult to find and highly sought after by collectors. The album was reissued on CD in 2015 and on vinyl in 2016.

The song entitled "Pustel Gunkel" makes some reference to Helena Rubinstein.

== Track listing ==
The track names are listed sequentially, but which songs appear on which side is not indicated. Titles in brackets are approximate translations.

- All lyrics by Thomas Spitzer. All music by Thomas Spitzer and Nino Holm, except where noted.
1. Life is a Dog-Boogie 1:24
2. Hereinspaziert (Come) 2:46
3. Horrortraum einer jungen Dame (A Young Lady's Nightmare) 3:41
4. Pustel Gunkel 3:59
5. Billy Beinhart 3:38
6. GTX de Luxe GS (GTX Deluxe GS) 4:41
7. Umberto e Sophia (Umberto and Sophia) 4:45
8. Model Todel Klimbim Samba 2:07
9. Disco Dillo 3:22
10. Uschi 8:23
11. Disco Queen 3:11 (Music: Scheutz, Spitzer, Holm)

== Personnel ==
EAV

- Wilfried Scheutz: lead vocals
- Thomas Spitzer: guitars, backing vocals, lead vocals on "Umberto e Sophia"
- Nino Holm: keyboards, backing vocals, co-lead vocals on "Uschi"
- Eik Breit: bass, harmonica, backing vocals
- Anders Stenmo: drums, percussion

== Production ==
- Arranged by 1. Allgemeine Verunsicherung
- Produced by Wilfried Scheutz
- Recorded and mixed by Gerry Edmond
