= Fürstenfeld =

- Municipality
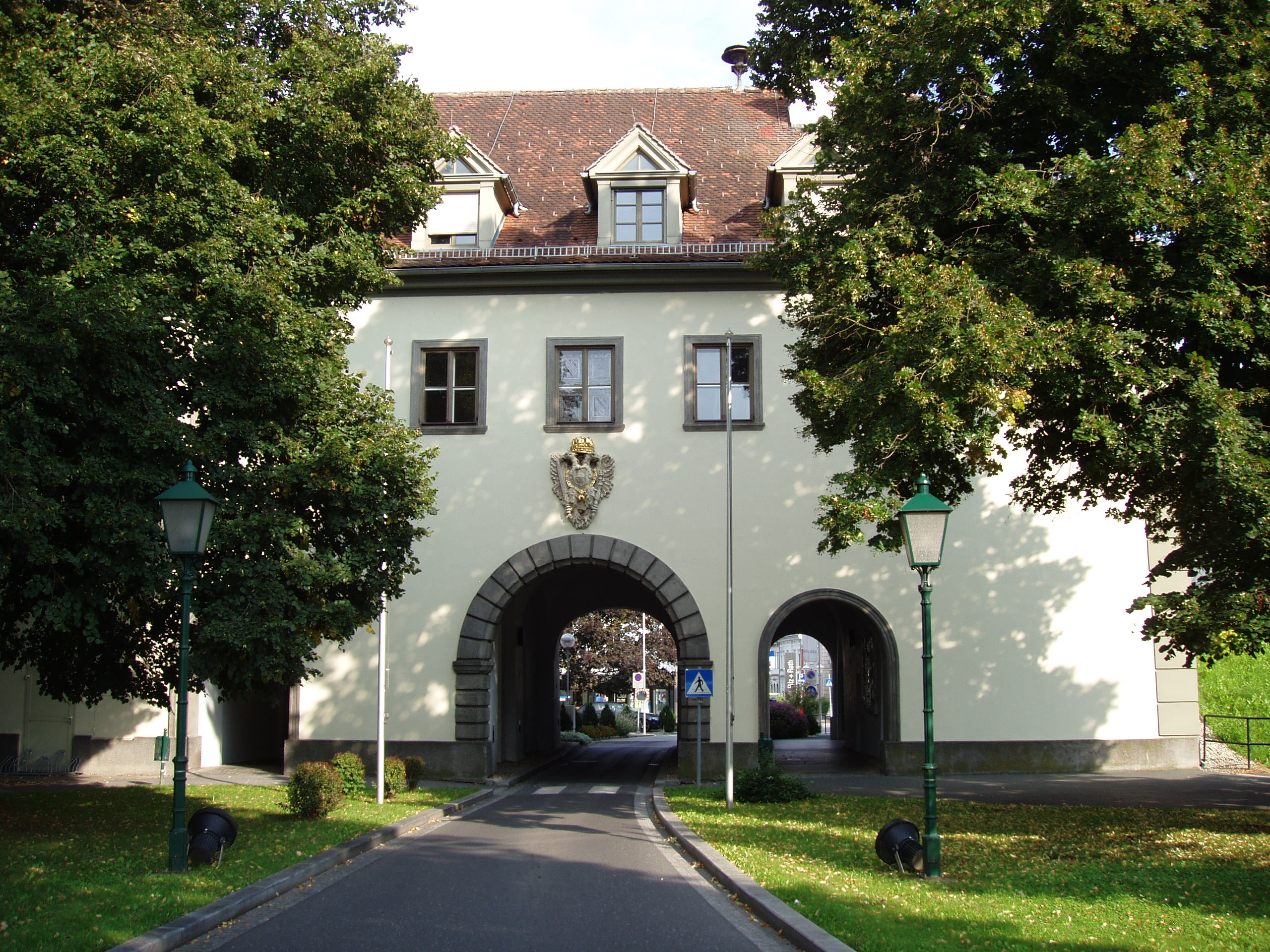
- Graz Gate, part of former town fortifications

- Coat of arms

- Location within Austria
- Coordinates: 47°03′00″N 16°05′00″E
- Country: Austria
- State: Styria
- District: Hartberg-Fürstenfeld

Government
  - Mayor: Franz Jost (ÖVP)

Area
  - Total: 50.31 km^{2} (19.42 sq mi)
- Elevation: 276 m (906 ft)

Population (2018-01-01)
  - Total: 8,549
  - Density: 169.9/km^{2} (440.1/sq mi)
- Time zone: UTC+1 (CET)
  - Summer (DST): UTC+2 (CEST)
- Postal code: 8280, 8362 Übersbach, Söchau
- Area code: +43 3382, +43 3387 Übersbach, Söchau
- Vehicle registration: HF
- Website: www.fuerstenfeld.at

Fürstenfeld (Austrian German: [ˈfʏrstn̩fɛld]; Hungarian: Fölöstöm) is a small historic city in Styria, Austria. It is situated near the border with Hungary, which is why the city was originally founded. The town has become quite famous in Austria and Germany because of the song by the same name by Styrian band S.T.S.

Fürstenfeld has a population of some 10,391 as of January 1, 2025. It was the centre of an eponymous district until the end of 2012, when this was merged with Hartberg to form the district of Hartberg-Fürstenfeld.

Fürstenfeld was founded around 1170 as a defense against the Hungarians (the present Austrian state of Burgenland was part of Hungary until after World War I, so Fürstenfeld used to lie right on the border) and received its town charter in 1215.

Today, it is known for its schools, middle-sized industry, and vicinity to several spa towns (Bad Blumau, Bad Loipersdorf and Bad Waltersdorf in Styria, and Stegersbach in Burgenland).

== Geography ==
Fürstenfeld is located in the lower Feistritz valley near the Burgenland border. Elevation of the urban area ranges from 255 m to approximately 300 m. The city`s central part sits on a river terrace two dozen meters above the valley floor.

== History ==
First human traces in the Fürstenfeld area are attributed to the Neolithic age. There are numerous Urnfield culture archaeological finds and the Romans also found their way into the later Province of Noricum bordering their Pannonia province. From the 6th century on, Slavs diffused into the Pannonic region and were followed by Bavarian settlers in the 8th century.

== Twin towns — sister cities ==
Fürstenfeld is twinned with:

- Aindling, Germany
- Körmend, Hungary
- Vişeu de Sus, Romania
- Zug, Switzerland

== Notable people ==
- Anita
- Herbert Depisch
- Wilfried Elmenreich, researcher and university professor
- Hans Fronius
- Sissy Handler
- Richard L. Heschl, born in Welsdorf
- Markus Hirtler (alias Ermi-Oma), cabaret artist
- Max J. Hiti
- Max Keimel
- Karl Mader, painter, graphic artist
- Bert Isatitsch
- Katharina Paldauf (1625-1675), "flower witch" prosecuted during the Great Witch trial of Feldbach
- Josef Reichl (1913, Rudersdorf - 2003)
- Helmut Röhrling (known as "Schiffkowitz"), member of S.T.S.
- Emmerich Schreiner
- Hanna Schulze-Bauer
- Hannes Schulze-Bauer
- Günter Timischl (born 1948, Fürstenfeld), member of S.T.S.
- Fritz Vogt
- Gregor von Rezzori, studied in Fürstenfeld
