= Café Passé =

Studio album by Erste Allgemeine Verunsicherung
- Released: May 1981
- Recorded: 1980–1981
- Studio: Magic Sounds Studios, Graz
- Genre: Pop, rock
- Label: Mood Records
- Producer: Erste Allgemeine Verunsicherung

Erste Allgemeine Verunsicherung chronology
1. Allgemeine Verunsicherung; (1978)	Café Passé (1981)	Spitalo Fatalo (1983)

Café Passé is the second album to be released by the Austrian group Erste Allgemeine Verunsicherung (EAV). It was released in 1981.

This album was released in Germany on vinyl, cassette and CD, however it failed to chart.

The album cover shows a picture of the band's members at the time, which were (from left to right) Walter Hammerl, Anders Stenmo, Nino Holm and Eik Breit on the top row and on the bottom is Marina Tatic and Thomas Spitzer.

This was to be the final album to feature Walter Hammerl as he died in the same year. The album was then reissued in 1983 on the catalogue number Mood 28622. Ten years later it was reissued again on CD (catalogue number EMI/Ding Dong 9592022) and on cassette (catalogue number EMI/Ding Dong 9592024)

== Track listing ==
- All songs written by Thomas Spitzer, except where noted.
1. Sohn, wo bist Du? (Son, Where are you?)
2. Im Café Passé (In the Café Passé)
3. Im Sommer 53 (In the Summer of '53)
4. Knickerbocker Rock
5. Oh nur Du (Oh only you)
6. Im Café Passé (2) (In the Café Passé) (2)
7. Aberakadabera (Abracadabra) (Spitzer, Gert Steinbäcker)
8. Woodstock
9. Im Café Passé (3) (In the Café Passé) (3)
10. Wir marschieren (We March)
11. Alpen-Punk
12. Im Café Passé (4) (In the Café Passé) (4)
13. Rasta Disasta Reggae
14. Im Café Passé (5) (In the Café Passé) (2)
15. Vienna
16. Wien, Wien, nur Du allein (Vienna, Vienna, Only You Alone) (Spitzer, Steinbäcker)

Out of this track listing, Alpen-Punk and Oh Nur Du were released as singles. Alpen-Punk was released in Germany on catalogue number Echo ZYX 45001 on 7 inch and Rasta Disasta Reggae was on the B side.

Oh Nur Du was released in Germany on catalogue number Echo ZYX Z253 on 7 inch and featured Vienna on the B side.

== Personnel ==
EAV

- Gert Steinbäcker: lead vocals
- Thomas Spitzer: guitars, backing vocals
- Nino Holm: keyboards, backing vocals
- Eik Breit: bass, backing vocals, lead vocals on "Im Sommer 53" and "Rasta Disasta Reggae"
- Anders Stenmo: drums
- Walter Hammerl: "Ober Franz", backing vocals, lead vocals on "Sohn, wo bist Du?" and "Wir marschieren", co-lead vocals on "Alpen-Punk"

Additional personnel

- St. Mareiner Blasmusik
