= Riegersburg =

- Municipality
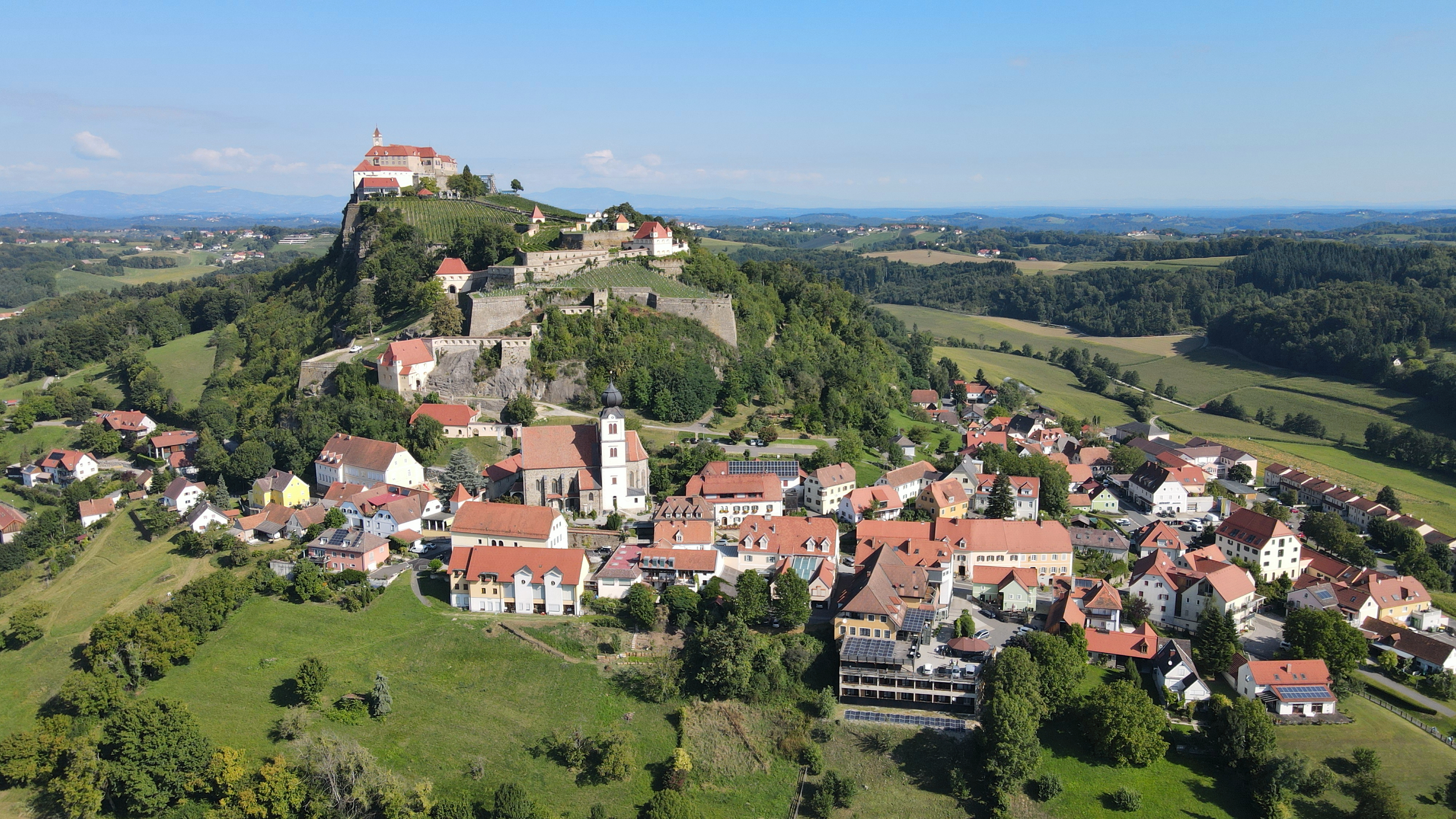
- Aerial view of Riegersburg

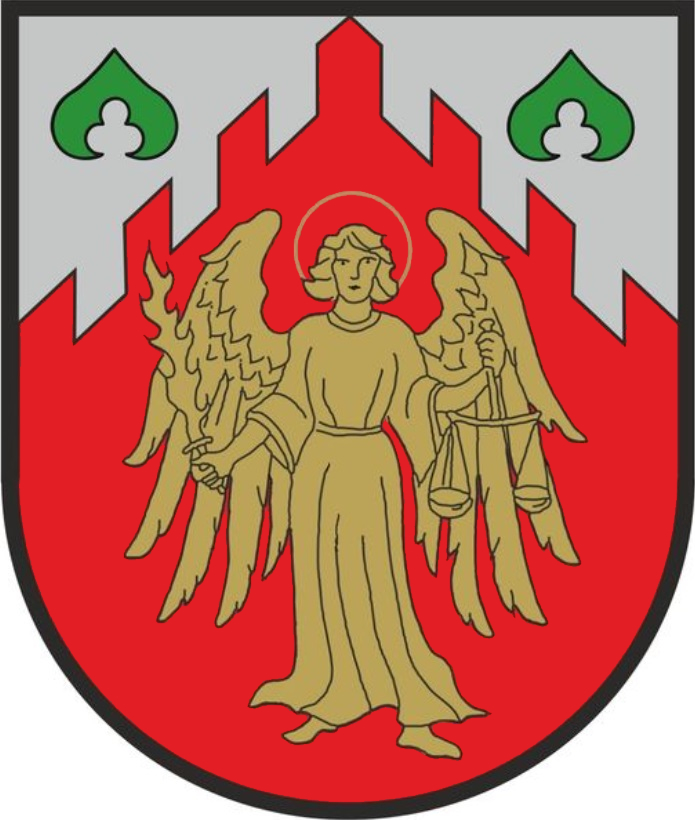
- Coat of arms

- Location within Austria
- Coordinates: 47°00′00″N 15°56′00″E
- Country: Austria
- State: Styria
- District: Südoststeiermark

Government
  - Mayor: Manfred Reisenhofer (ÖVP)

Area
  - Total: 71.19 km^{2} (27.49 sq mi)
- Elevation: 377 m (1,237 ft)

Population (2018-01-01)
  - Total: 4,922
  - Density: 69.14/km^{2} (179.1/sq mi)
- Time zone: UTC+1 (CET)
  - Summer (DST): UTC+2 (CEST)
- Postal code: 8333, 8312, 8313, 8330, 8334, 8361
- Area code: +43 3153
- Vehicle registration: SO
- Website: www.riegersburg.gv.at

Riegersburg is a municipality in the district of Südoststeiermark in the Austrian state of Styria. Riegersburg Castle stands on a hill above the town.

== Population ==
Historical population
Year	Pop.	±%
1869	5,433	—
1880	5,679	+4.5%
1890	5,688	+0.2%
1900	5,731	+0.8%
1910	5,831	+1.7%
1923	5,608	−3.8%
1934	5,702	+1.7%
1939	5,411	−5.1%
1951	5,350	−1.1%
1961	5,124	−4.2%
1971	5,384	+5.1%
1981	5,278	−2.0%
1991	5,238	−0.8%
2001	5,215	−0.4%
2011	5,046	−3.2%
2021	4,926	−2.4%
