= Geld oder Leben! =

Geld oder Leben

Studio album by Erste Allgemeine Verunsicherung
- Released: October 11, 1985
- Genre: Pop, pop rap
- Label: EMI Columbia

Erste Allgemeine Verunsicherung chronology
A la Carte (1984)	Geld oder Leben (1985)	Liebe, Tod & Teufel (1987)

Geld oder Leben! ("Your Money or Your Life!") is an album by the Austrian band Erste Allgemeine Verunsicherung.

It was released in Germany in 1985 on EMI Columbia on the vinyl format and then reissued in 1986, also on vinyl but with a different cover. Also in 1986, the album was reissued on CD in Germany.

This album was released three times on cassette tape in the Netherlands, two of them in 1985, one on catalogue number EMI Columbia 1333634 and the other on catalogue number EMI Columbia 33394-8. In 1987, Geld oder Leben! was certified three times platinum in Austria.

The third issue was in 1991 on catalogue number EMI Columbia 1333634, with a different cover. In 1991, the album was also reissued on CD in the Netherlands, on catalogue number EMI Austria 7462302.

The tracks which feature "Johnny" at the start of the title are short humorous skits, in which the punchline usually changes the perspective of the previous part from a stereotypical Mafia-style criminal situation into something much more common and everydayish due to words with multiple meanings - e.g. in "Feuer", Johnny asks his boss whether he has fire (for a cigarette), and his boss responds with opening gunfire, and in "Bullen", Johnny warns his boss about "the bulls are coming" (German slang, similar to "the cops are coming"), to which the boss responds "let them in", followed by the noise of a bull stampede.

== Track listing ==
No.	Title	English Translation	Length
1.	"Geld oder Leben"	"Your Money or Your Life"	4:48
2.	"Johnny 1 – Fahrscheine"	"Johnny 1 – Tickets"	0:43
3.	"Ba-Ba-Banküberfall"	"Ba-Ba-Bankrobbery"	3:36
4.	"Johnny 2 – Zuckerwatte"	"Johnny 2 – Candy Floss"	0:33
5.	"Heiße Nächte in Palermo"	"Hot Nights in Palermo"	3:32
6.	"Einsamkeit"	"Loneliness"	4:20
7.	"Fata Morgana"		4:20
8.	"Märchenprinz"	"Prince Charming"	3:32
9.	"Johnny 3 – Bullen"	"Johnny 3 – Cops"	0:27
10.	"Helden"	"Heroes"	4:11
11.	"Johnny 4 – Feuer"	"Johnny 4 – Fire"	0:18
12.	"Küss die Hand, Herr Kerkermeister"	"Kiss the Hand, Mr. Gaoler"	4:51
13.	"Johnny 5 – WC"		0:29
14.	"Es g'winnt a jeder"	"Everyone Wins Some"	3:22
15.	"Morgen…"	"Tomorrow…"	3:42

== "Ba-Ba-Bankrobbery" ==
The band attempted to become better known in the international market by releasing their first – and only – English language single "Ba-Ba-Bankrobbery" in 1986 (apart from a translation of the song "Ding Dong"). This English-language version of "Ba-Ba-Banküberfall", which was originally released in 1985 as a single but only in Germany appears on the Geld oder Leben album. "Ba-Ba-Bankrobbery" was released as a single in the UK, Germany, Spain and Canada on both 7" and 12" formats. The single was also released in Japan on 7" only.

The 12" (or maxi) version appears on the Kann denn Schwachsinn Sünde sein? ("Can Imbecility Be a Sin?") album.

"Ba-Ba-Bankrobbery" is basically a rap song about how a man with no money can survive and comes up with the idea of robbing a bank as he cannot think of any other way. The "English-German" version is just the English version in a German accent. It is not a bilingual version as the title may suggest. The "British-British" version is the same but with a British accent; this appeared as extended form on the 12" releases along with the standard length "English-German" version and the German-language version itself. The 7" single labelled the A-side as "Ba-Ba-Bankrobbery (English Version??)". The Guinness Hit Singles book printed this title exactly how it was printed on the label which made it look as though the authors were not sure of what they were printing. This was in the 7th edition, however more recent copies appeared to have dropped the question marks.

The song did not gain much success. In the UK, it was in the top 75 for just 4 weeks, peaking at number 68. The standard UK 7" featured the German accent version on the A-side and the German-language version on the B-side. The band did not record any further English-language versions of their songs, but used English in some of their regular songs.

Despite the band's failed attempt to gain international fame, they still remain quite popular in Germany and Austria.

== Personnel ==
Erste Allgemeine Verunsicherung

- Klaus Eberhartinger: lead vocals
- Thomas Spitzer: guitars, vocals, lead vocals on "Helden"
- Nino Holm: keyboards, bass, backing vocals
- Eik Breit: bass, backing vocals
- Anders Stenmo: drums
- Mario Bottazzi: backing vocals
- Günther Schönberger: backing vocals

Additional personnel

- Marion Müller: backing vocals

== Certifications ==
Region	Certification	Certified units/sales
Austria (IFPI Austria)	5× Platinum	250,000^{*}
^{*} Sales figures based on certification alone.
