= Erste Allgemeine Verunsicherung =

Austrian pop group

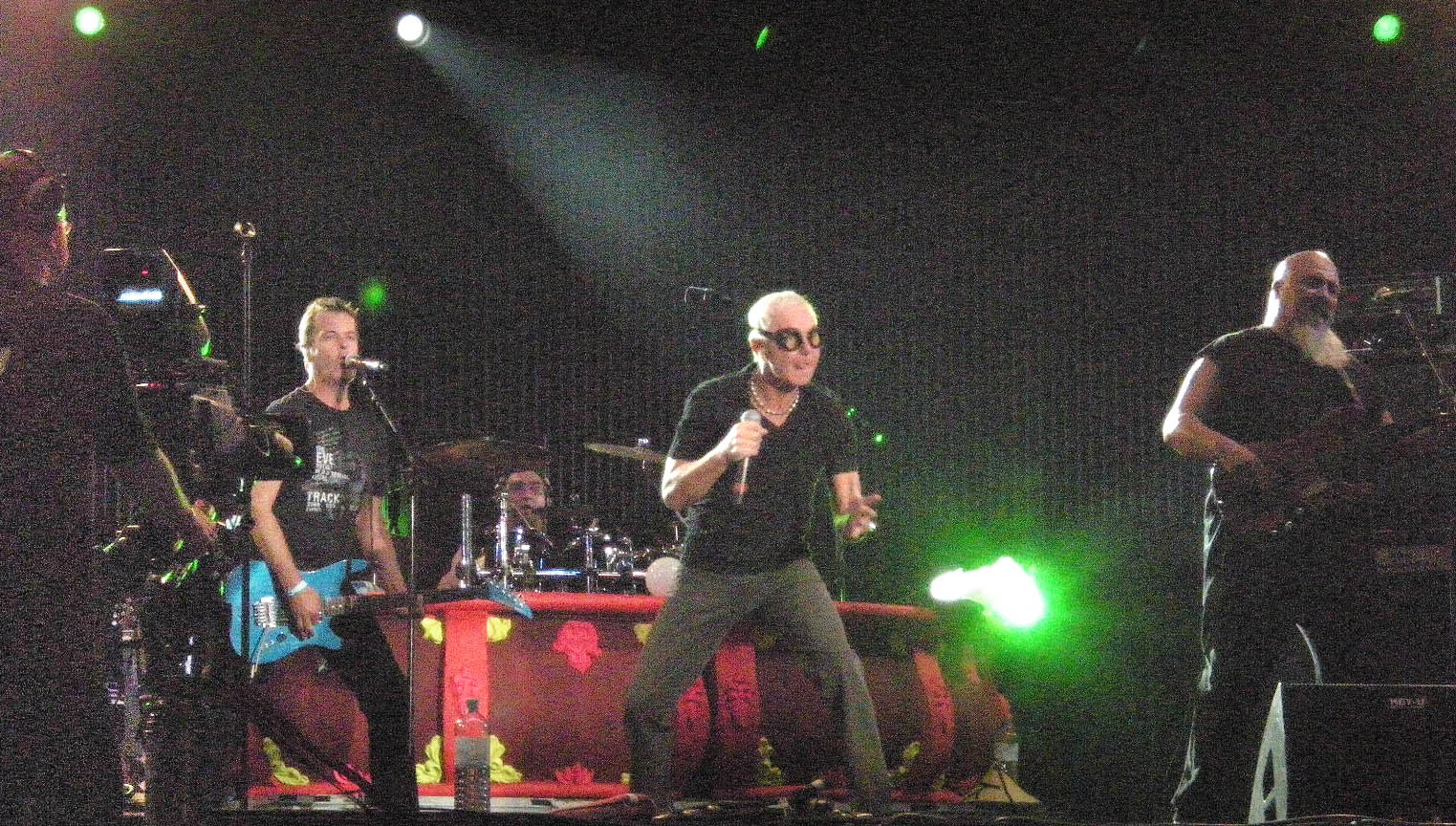
- EAV in 2008

Background information
- Origin: Austria
- Genres: Pop, comedy music, Austropop
- Years active: 1977–2019
- Labels: EMI Austria 1983-2003; Sony BMG Ariola since 2005
- Past members: Thomas Spitzer (1977-2019) Nino Holm (1977-1995); Eik Breit (1977-1996); Anders Stenmo (deceased) (1977-1998); Walter Hammerl (deceased)(1977-1981); Wilfried Scheutz (deceased) (1978-1979); Günther Schönberger (1978-1996); Gert Steinbäcker (1979-1983); Klaus Eberhartinger (1981-2019); Mario Bottazzi (1983-1990); Andy Töfferl (deceased) (1990-2001); David Bronner (deceased) (1995-1998); Kurt Keinrath (1996-2019); Leo Bei (1997-2014); Alex Deutsch (1998); Franz Zettl (1998-2001); Robert Baumgartner (1998-2014); Franz Kreimer (2001-2019); Reinhard Stranzinger (2010-2017); Alvis Reid (2015-2019) Aaron Thier (2015-2019)
- Website: eav.at

The EAV (Erste Allgemeine Verunsicherung, German for "First General Insecurity/Uncertainty/'Uninsurance'") was an Austrian band, formed in 1977 and disbanded in 2019.

Nino Holm first established a band called "Anti-Pasta", but it was not successful and it dissolved after three years. Holm then decided together with his friend Thomas Spitzer to create a new band. While they were undecided on a name, they saw a bus stop in a branch of "Erste Allgemeine Versicherung" ("First General Insurance"), abbreviated EAV, and so they came to the name "Erste Allgemeine Verunsicherung-EAV".

They initially faced legal difficulty in Austria due to the (obviously intended) similarity of their band name to that of the corporation "Erste Allgemeine Versicherung". This was later dropped and the insurance company was even known to sponsor them on a few occasions.

The EAV often changed their members. The members of their final touring lineup were Klaus Eberhartinger (Vocals), Thomas Spitzer (Guitar, Vocals), Kurt Keinrath (Guitar, Keyboard, bass guitar), Franz Kreimer (Keyboard), Alvis Reid (Bass guitar) and Aaron Thier (Drums).

The stage shows were known for lavishness in both backdrop and costumes, the latter often selected and changed for specific songs that are then acted out by either the vocalist or other members.

Despite the band's failed attempt to gain international fame, they still remain quite popular in Germany and Austria.

== Style ==
Their songs are mostly comical and weird in nature, but the lyrics contain hints of social criticism as well. For example, "Cinderella" (1994) is one of their "fun" songs, in which they tell the tale of Cinderella in a funny way: "Sie schlief im Kohlenkeller, trotzdem war sie bettelarm, weil sie von der vielen Kohle, die da lag, zu wenig nahm" ("She slept in the coal cellar, but she was dirt-poor, because she didn't take much of the plentiful coal that lay there"). The word "Kohle" ("coal") is a colloquial word for money in German.

More critical lyrics can be seen in the song "Burli" (1987), which tells the story of a boy born shortly after the Chernobyl accident in an exaggerated and humorous way: "Herr Anton hat ein Häuschen mit einem Gartenzwerg und davor, da steht ein Kernkraftwerk. Da gab es eines Tages eine kleine Havarie, die Tomaten war'n so groß wie nie…" ("Mr. Anton has a small house with a garden gnome, and nearby there's a nuclear power plant. One day there was a small accident - the tomatoes were bigger than ever before…"). Both "Burli" and the song "Afrika" led radio stations to boycott the band.

The band is known for open statements against political extremism especially on the right ("bacillus nationalis") and was sued by prominent politicians of the political right like Kurt Waldheim for drawing attention to his past in the 3rd Reich and Jörg Haider, then-head of the right-leaning FPÖ. Songs on this topic include e.g. "Eierkopf-Rudi" or "Wir marschieren".

== Members ==
=== Deaths of members ===
In February 1981, group member Walter Hammerl (b. 1952) committed suicide by hanging. He had attempted suicide before. He was a close friend of Klaus Eberhartinger, who took over his duties. Bandmate Thomas Spitzer commented that it was worrying how the band got on and felt so close to Walter Hammerl, but without actually knowing him. Hammerl had mainly done managing and stage directing work for the band, however he did sing on a few tracks.

On May 5, 2012, former keyboard player Andy Töfferl died of a heart attack at the age of 56 years.

On July 16, 2017, former singer Wilfried Scheutz died after a short battle with cancer at the age of 67 years.

At the end of July 2023, former drummer and founding member Anders Stenmo died at the age of 67 years for unknown reasons.

=== Line-ups ===
1977	Thomas Spitzer – guitar, vocals; Nino Holm – keyboards, vocals; Eik Breit – bass guitar, vocals; Anders Stenmo – drums
1978-1979	Wilfried Scheutz – vocals; Thomas Spitzer – guitar, vocals; Nino Holm – keyboards, vocals; Eik Breit – bass guitar, vocals; Anders Stenmo – drums; Walter Hammerl – conférencier; Marina Tatic – stage show; Gabi Aigner – stage show; Günther Schönberger – stage show, saxophone
1979	Gert Steinbäcker – vocals; Thomas Spitzer – guitar, vocals; Nino Holm – keyboards, vocals; Eik Breit – bass guitar, vocals; Anders Stenmo – drums; Walter Hammerl – conférencier, vocals; Gabi Aigner – stage show; Günther Schönberger – stage show, saxophone; Günter Timischl – stage show; Schiffkowitz – stage show
1980-1981	Gert Steinbäcker – vocals; Thomas Spitzer – guitar, vocals; Nino Holm – keyboards, vocals; Eik Breit – bass guitar, vocals; Anders Stenmo – drums; Walter Hammerl – conférencier, vocals; Gabi Aigner – stage show; Günther Schönberger – stage show, saxophone; Günter Timischl – stage show
1981-1983	Gert Steinbäcker – vocals; Thomas Spitzer – guitar, vocals; Nino Holm – keyboards, vocals; Eik Breit – bass guitar, vocals; Anders Stenmo – drums; Klaus Eberhartinger – conférencier, vocals; Günther Schönberger – stage show, saxophone; Günter Timischl – stage show
1983-1990	Klaus Eberhartinger – vocals; Thomas Spitzer – guitar, vocals; Nino Holm – keyboards, vocals; Eik Breit – bass guitar, vocals; Mario Bottazzi – keyboards, vocals; Anders Stenmo – drums; Günther Schönberger – stage show
1990-1995	Klaus Eberhartinger – vocals; Thomas Spitzer – guitar, vocals; Nino Holm – keyboards, vocals; Eik Breit – bass guitar, vocals; Andy Töfferl – keyboards, accordion, vocals; Anders Stenmo – drums; Günther Schönberger – stage show
1995	Klaus Eberhartinger – vocals; Thomas Spitzer – guitar, vocals; Eik Breit – bass guitar, vocals; Andy Töfferl – keyboards, accordion, vocals; David Bronner – keyboards; Anders Stenmo – drums; Günther Schönberger – stage show
1996	Klaus Eberhartinger – vocals; Thomas Spitzer – guitar, vocals; Andy Töfferl – keyboards, accordion, vocals; David Bronner – keyboards; Kurt Keinrath – bass guitar, vocals; Anders Stenmo – drums
1997	Klaus Eberhartinger – vocals; Thomas Spitzer – guitar, vocals; Andy Töfferl – keyboards, accordion, vocals; Kurt Keinrath – guitar, keyboards, vocals; Leo Bei – bass, vocals; Anders Stenmo – drums
1998	Klaus Eberhartinger – vocals; Thomas Spitzer – guitar, vocals; Andy Töfferl – keyboards, accordion, vocals; Kurt Keinrath – guitar, keyboards, vocals; Leo Bei – bass, vocals; Franz Zettl – keyboards, saxophone, trumpet; Alex Deutsch – drums
1998-2001	Klaus Eberhartinger – vocals; Thomas Spitzer – guitar, vocals; Andy Töfferl – keyboards, accordion, vocals; Kurt Keinrath – guitar, keyboards, vocals; Leo Bei – bass, vocals; Franz Zettl – keyboards, saxophone, trumpet; Robert Baumgartner – drums
2001-2010	Klaus Eberhartinger – vocals; Thomas Spitzer – guitar, vocals; Kurt Keinrath – guitar, keyboards, vocals; Leo Bei – bass, vocals; Franz Kreimer – keyboards, saxophone, accordion, vocals; Robert Baumgartner – drums
2010-2014	Klaus Eberhartinger – vocals; Thomas Spitzer – guitar, vocals; Kurt Keinrath – guitar, keyboards, vocals; Leo Bei – bass, vocals; Franz Kreimer – keyboards, saxophone, accordion, vocals; Robert Baumgartner – drums; with: Reinhard Stranzinger - guitar, vocals
2015-2019	Klaus Eberhartinger – vocals; Thomas Spitzer – guitar, vocals; Kurt Keinrath – guitar, keyboards, vocals; Franz Kreimer – keyboards, saxophone, accordion, vocals; Alvis Reid – bass, vocals; Aaron Thier – drums; with: Reinhard Stranzinger - guitar, vocals

== Discography ==
- 1978: 1. Allgemeine Verunsicherung (1st General Confusion)
- 1981: Café Passé
- 1983: Spitalo Fatalo (Hospitalo Fatalo)
- 1984: À la Carte
- 1985: Geld oder Leben! (Your Money or Your Life!)
- 1987: Liebe, Tod & Teufel (Love, Death & The Devil)
- 1990: Neppomuk's Rache (Neppomuk's Revenge)
- 1991: Watumba!
- 1994: Nie wieder Kunst (No More Art)
- 1997: Im Himmel ist die Hölle los! (All Hell is Breaking Loose In Heaven!)
- 1998: Himbeerland (Raspberryland)
- 2000: Austropop in Tot-Weiß-Tot (Austropop in Dead-White-Dead; ['Dead-White-Dead' is a pun on the colours of the Austrian national flag: Red-White-Red, German: Rot-Weiß-Rot])
- 2003: Frauenluder (Woman Slut)
- 2007: Amore XL (Love XL)
- 2010: Neue Helden braucht das Land (The Nation Needs New Heroes)
- 2015: Werwolf-Attacke! (Werewolf Attack!)
- 2016: Was haben wir gelacht (How We Laughed)
- 2018: Alles ist erlaubt (Anything Goes)
- 2021: Ihr Sünderlein kommet (Oh Come, Ye Little Sinners)
