= Thomas Spitzer =

Austrian lyricist, composer, singer, guitarist and graphic designer

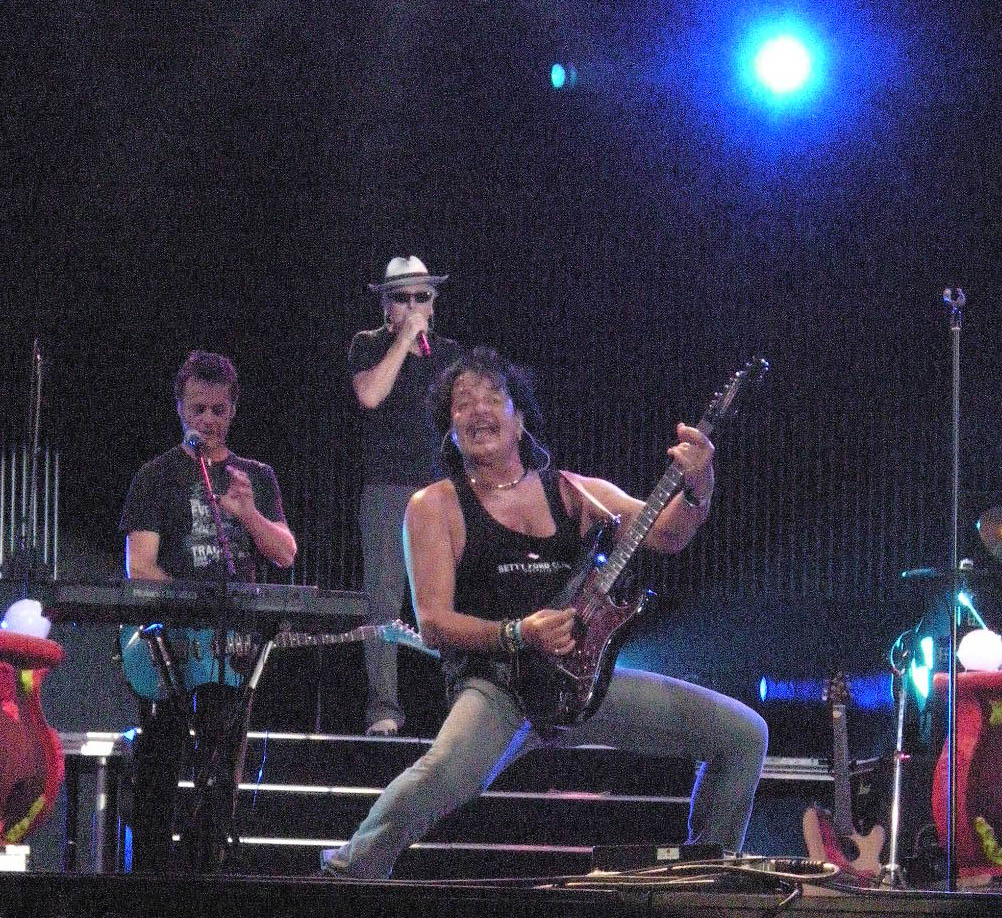
- Spitzer (front, with guitar) during a performance of EAV in 2008
- Born: 6 April 1953 (age 72); Graz, Styria, Austria
- Occupations: Lyricist, composer, singer, guitarist and graphic designer
- Children: 2

Thomas Spitzer (born 6 April 1953 in Graz, Styria) is an Austrian lyricist, composer, singer, guitarist and graphic designer. He is a founding member the band Erste Allgemeine Verunsicherung (EAV), whose lyrics, album artwork and illustrations come almost exclusively from him.

== Life ==
Spitzer was born in 1953 in Graz, Austria. His music career began in the Styrian rock band "Mephisto", where he played alongside Gert Steinbäcker. In April 1977 he was guitarist of the group "Antipasta". Shortly thereafter, broke up the band and Spitzer joined with Eik Breit, Nino Holm and Anders Stenmo and formed Erste Allgemeine Verunsicherung.

Spitzer studied graphic design at the Art Academy in Graz and actually wanted to be a painter. As a thesis, he submitted in 1980 the album EAV Café Passé, stage and costume designs as well as recording the live show as a multimedia project and was given the graphic artist's diploma. In 2008 he first exhibited his prints of the EAV as part of an opening.

Since 1992, Spitzer has been living in Kenya for several months in the year. When he is not living in Kenya, he lives in Feldbach, Austria. He has a daughter and a son.

== Career ==
Thomas Spitzer is known for his satirical lyrics. In addition to his work for the Erste Allgemeine Verunsicherung, he also wrote for other Austrian artists, such as Udo Jürgens and his song "Café Größenwahn". On the occasion of the "1000 years of Austria," jubilee, he wrote "Tu Felix Austria", which was then recorded together with Wolfgang Ambros, Gert Steinbäcker, and Opus. The text of Carl Peyers's Austropop hit "Romeo and Juliet" was also from Spitzer.

Spitzer is also known for his use of dialect words and intentionally induced grammatical inaccuracies, the lyrics give the local colour. A lot of this can be seen in his songs written for Erste Allgemeine Verunsicherung. This is sometimes done for humorous purposes.

Despite the many humorous works Spitzer has written, he is not a pure comical songwriter. Many of the EAV songs are of a corporate and anti-church nature and are directed against right-wing extremists. Some songs also contain strong language and sexual references.
