= Thomas Forstner =

Austrian singer

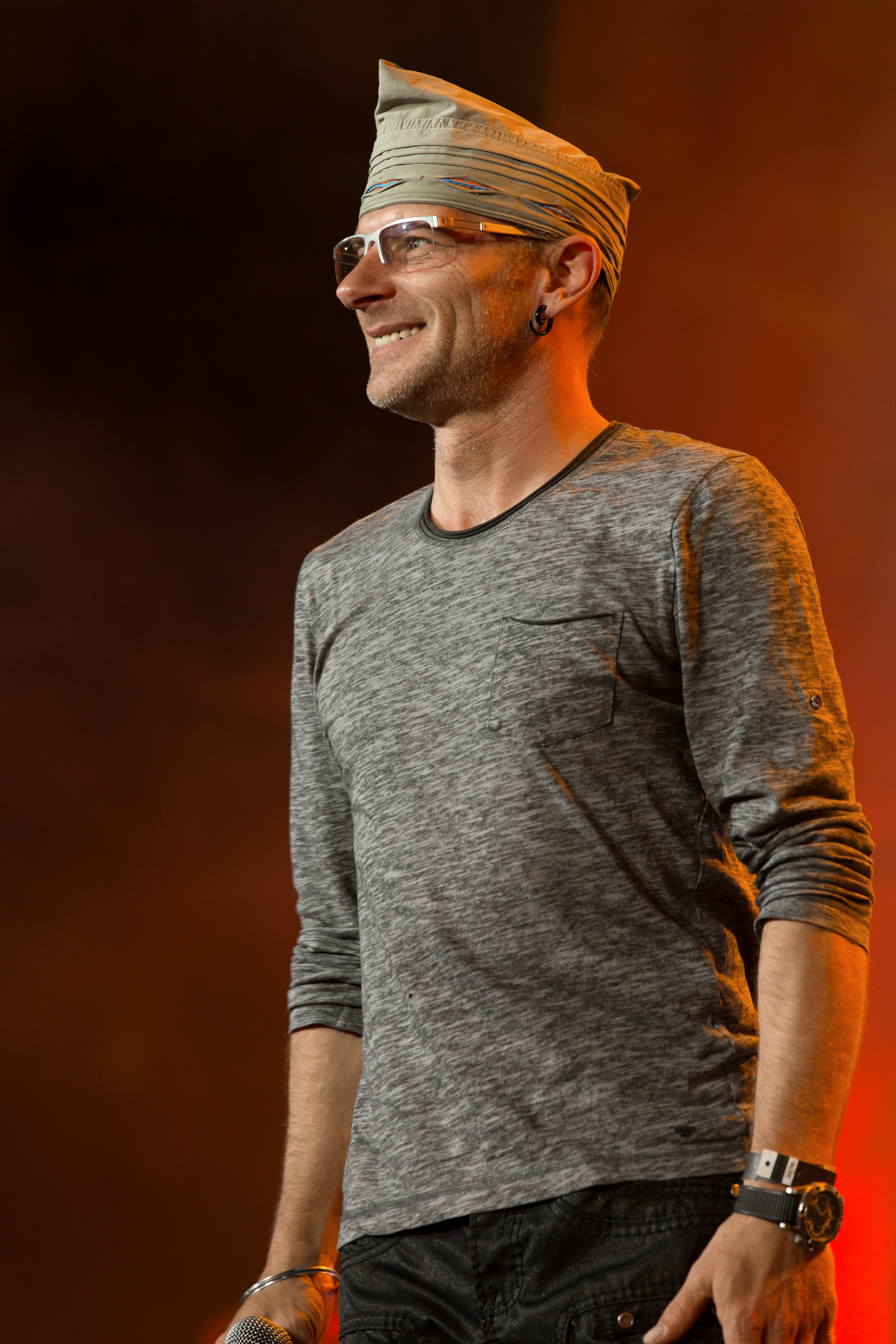
- Forstner at the Eurovision Village in 2015

Background information
- Born: 3 December 1969 (age 56); Deutsch-Wagram, Austria
- Genres: Slager
- Occupation: Singer
- Years active: 1988-present
- Spouse: Bianca Rosenberg

Thomas Forstner (born 3 December 1969) is an Austrian singer who has represented Austria in the Eurovision Song Contest twice. In 1989 he performed "Nur ein Lied" ("Only A Song") in Lausanne, giving Austria the fifth place — their highest position since their last win in 1966 and until Austria's win in 2014. Forstner was selected to represent Austria again in Rome in 1991. His entry, "Venedig im Regen" ("Venice in the Rain") came in last at 22nd, failing to score a single point.

== Discography ==
=== Albums ===
List of albums, with selected details
Title	Details
Hautnah	Released: 1994; Label: Wow World Of Wonder; Format: CD, CS

=== Charting singles ===
List of singles, with selected chart positions
Title	Year	Chart positions
Title	Year	AUT
"Nur ein Lied"	1989	1
"Wenn nachts die Sonne scheint"	1989	13
"Miles Away"	1990	9
"Venedig im Regen"	1991	5

Preceded by Simone	Austria in the Eurovision Song Contest; 1991	Succeeded by Tony Wegas
Preceded by Wilfried	Austria in the Eurovision Song Contest; 1989	Succeeded by Simone
