= The Masked Singer Austria season 1 =

The Masked Singer Austria
- Season 1
- Starring: Elke Winkens; Nathan Trent; Sasa Schwarzjirg; Various guests
- Hosted by: Arabella Kiesbauer
- No. of contestants: 8
- Winners: Nadine Beiler as "Yeti"
- Runners-up: Simone Stelzer as "Lipizzaner"
- No. of episodes: 6

Release
- Original network: Puls 4
- Original release: 14 March – 13 October 2020

Season chronology
- Next → Season 2

The first season of the Austrian singing competition The Masked Singer Austria premiered on 14 March 2020 on Puls 4. The panelists were Elke Winkens, Nathan Trent and Sasa Schwarzjirg. The host was Arabella Kiesbauer.

On 19 March 2020 the channel Puls 4 announced that the production would be interrupted due to the COVID-19 pandemic in Austria. The program continued on 15 September 2020.

On 13 October 2020, the Yeti (singer Nadine Beiler) was declared the winner and the Lipizzaner (singer Simone Stelzer) was the runner-up.

== Panelists and host ==
Season 1 panelists and host

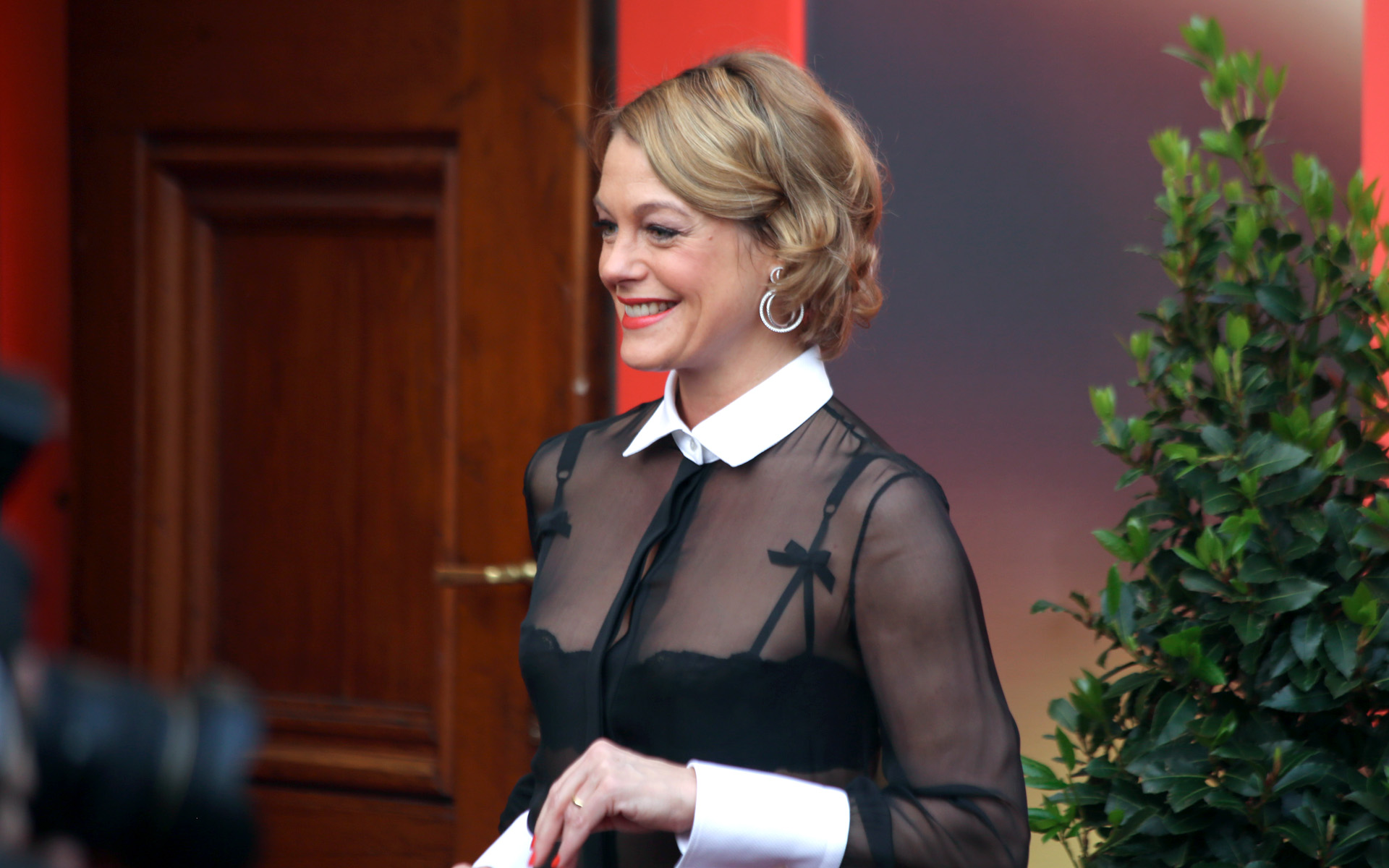
Elke Winkens

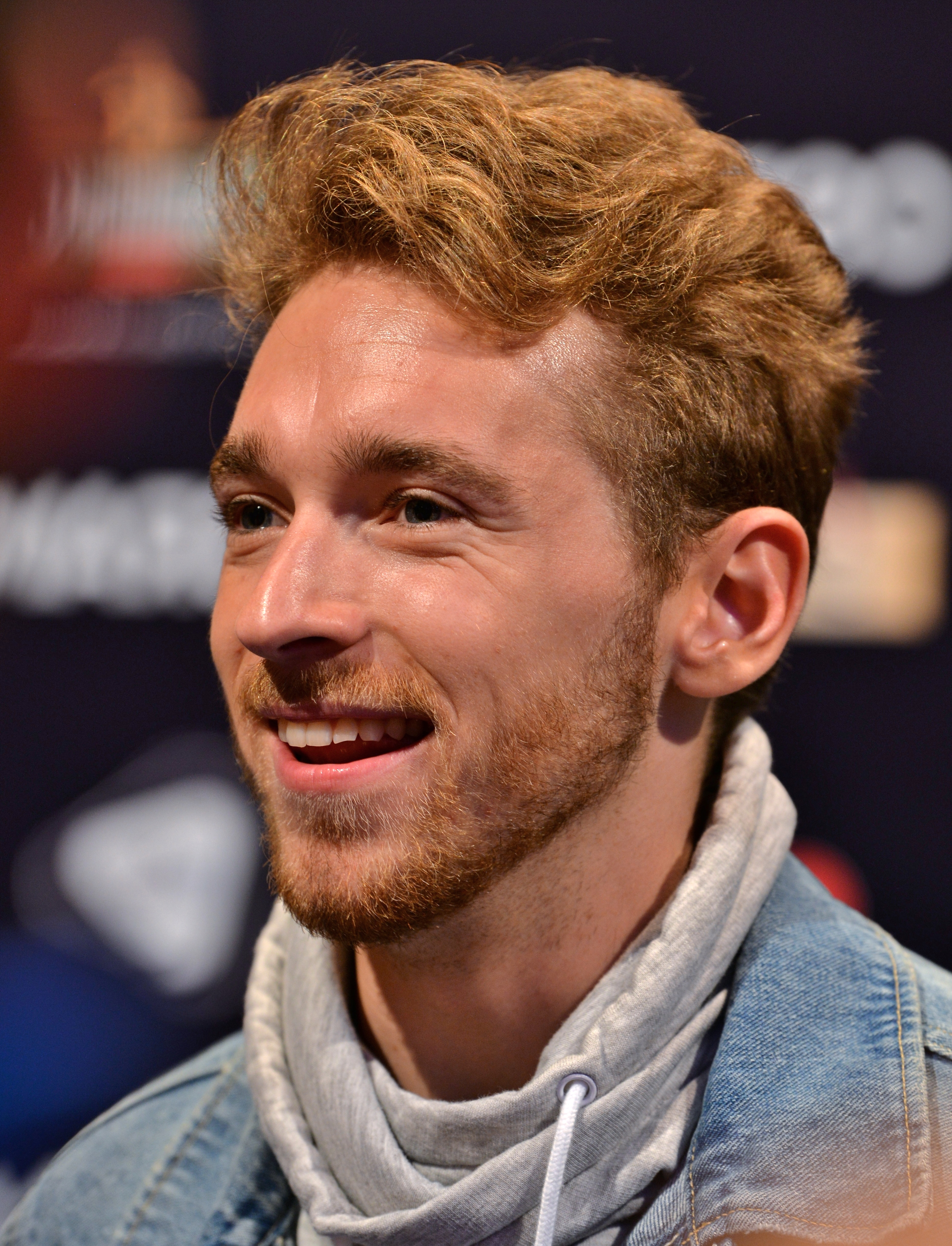
Nathan Trent

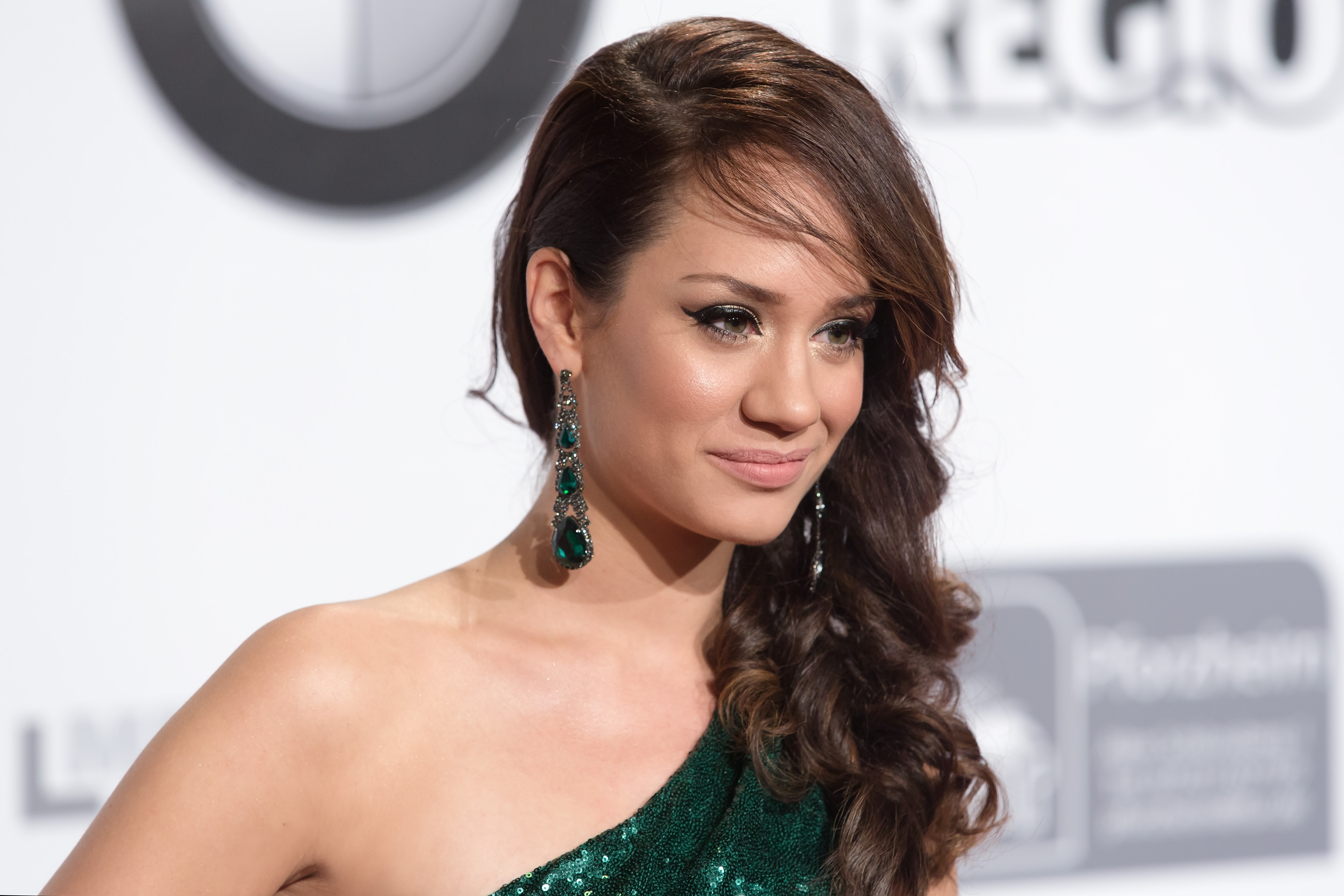
Sasa Schwarzjirg

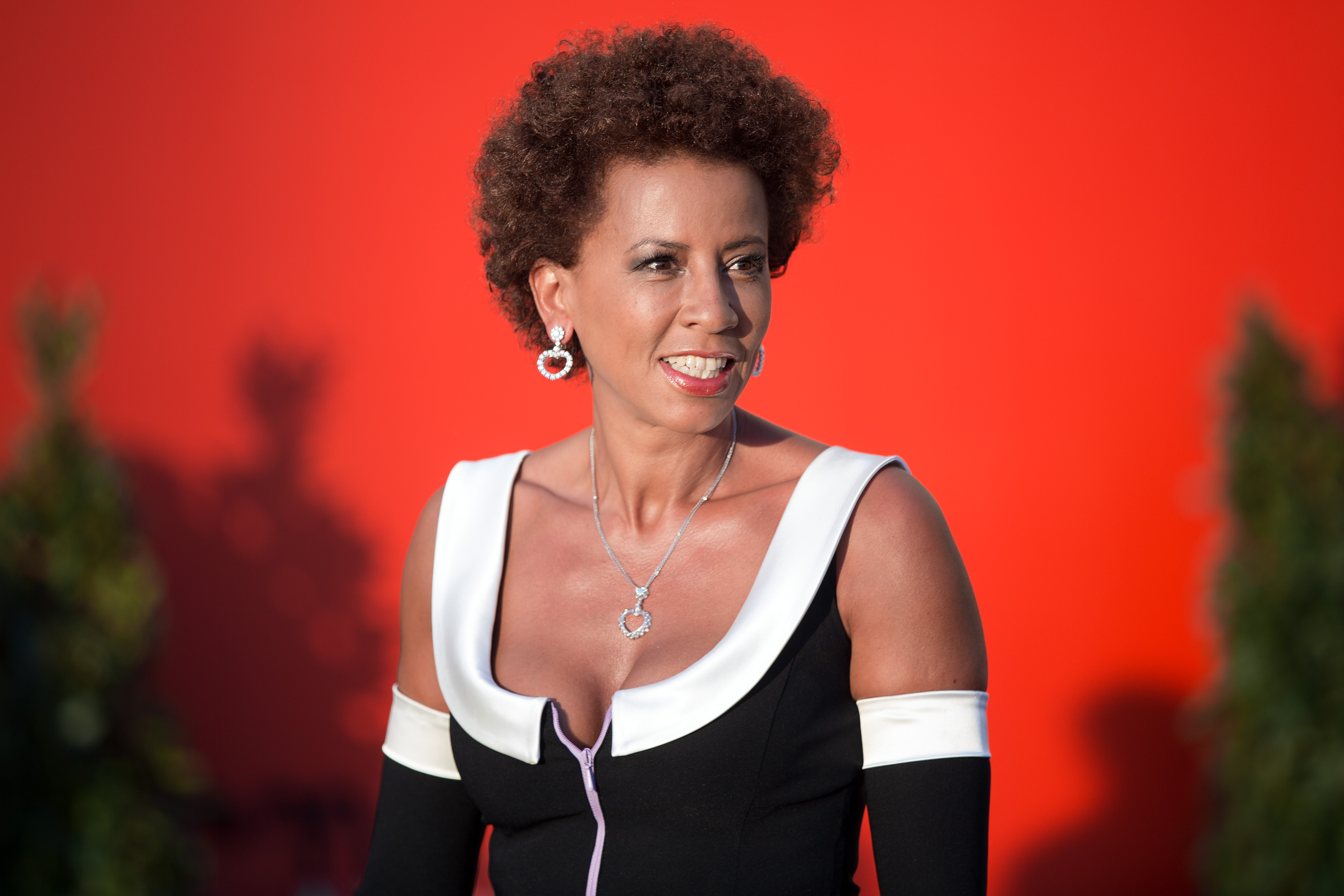
Arabella Kiesbauer

=== Guest panelists ===
Throughout the first season, various guest judges appeared alongside Elke Winkens, Nathan Trent and Sasa Schwarzjirg as the fourth member of the judging panel, for one episode.

These guest panelists have included:

Episode	Name	Notability
1	Nazar	Rapper
2	Hans Sigl	Actor
3	Josh.	Singer
4	Cesár Sampson	Singer
5	Gery Seidl	Actor
6	Manuel Rubey	Actor & Comedian

== Contestants ==
Stage name	Celebrity	Notability	Episodes						
Stage name	Celebrity	Notability	1	2	3	4	5	6	
Stage name	Celebrity	Notability	1	2	3	4	5	A	B
Yeti	Nadine Beiler	Singer	RISK	WIN	WIN	WIN	WIN	SAFE	WINNER
Lipizzaner	Simone Stelzer	Singer	WIN	WIN	WIN	WIN	RISK	SAFE	RUNNER-UP
Geistergräfin "Ghost Countess"	Nina Proll	Actress/singer	WIN	WIN	WIN	RISK	WIN	THIRD	
Karpfen "Carp"	Rainer Schönfelder	Retired Ski Racer	RISK	WIN	RISK	RISK	OUT		
Klimaheld "Climate Hero"	Lukas Plöchl	Rapper	WIN	RISK	RISK	OUT			
Katze "Cat"	Sabine Petzl	Actress	WIN	RISK	OUT				
Steinbock "Ibex"	Alfons Haider	Actor/singer	RISK	OUT					
Falke "Falcon"	James Cottriall	Musician/singer	OUT						

The masked singer won their face-off and remained in the competition.
The masked singer lost their face-off and was in the bottom three/two, but was not eliminated.
The masked singer was safe from elimination.
The masked singer was eliminated from the competition and unmasked upon their elimination.
- Carp is also known as Carp Diva

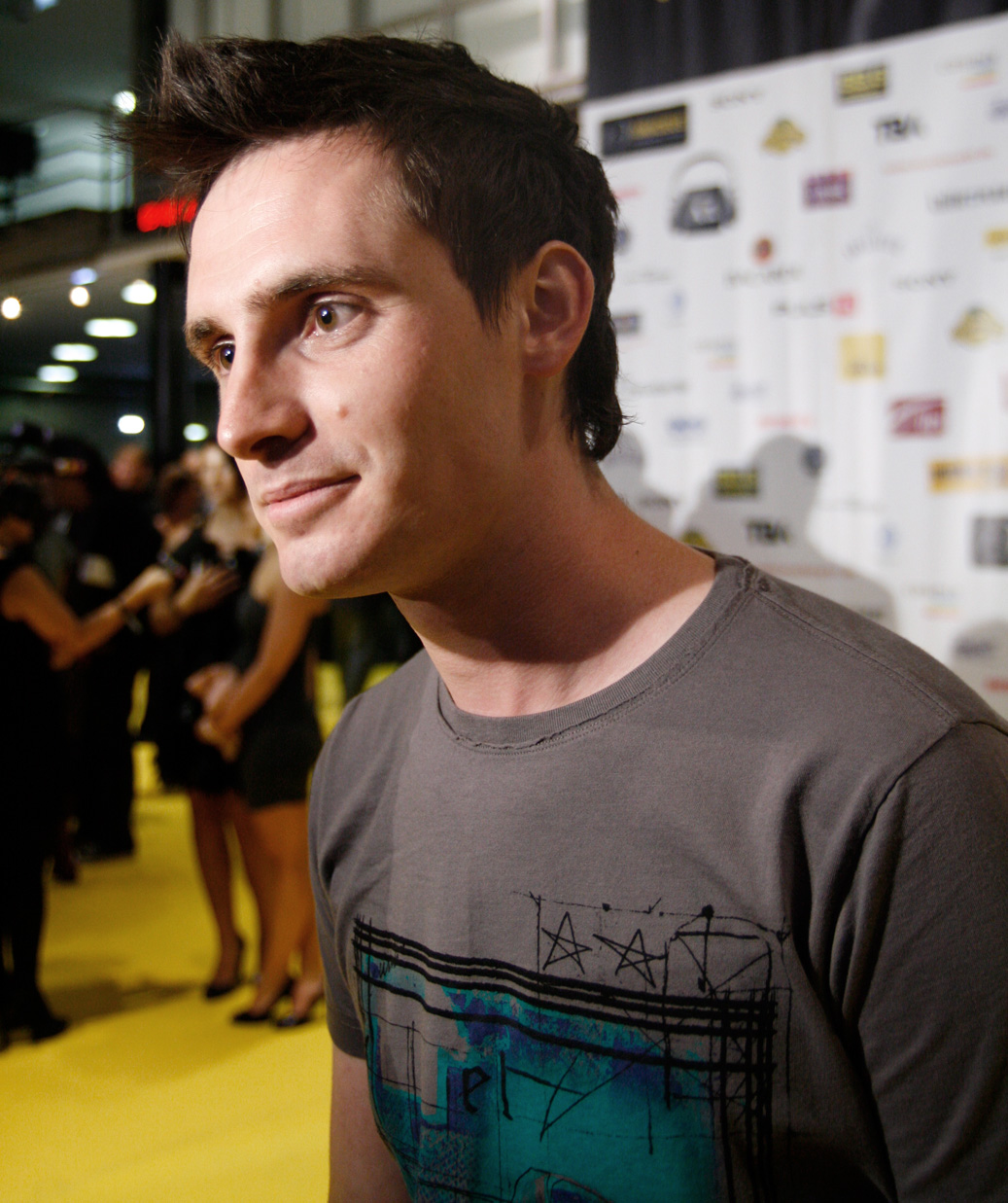
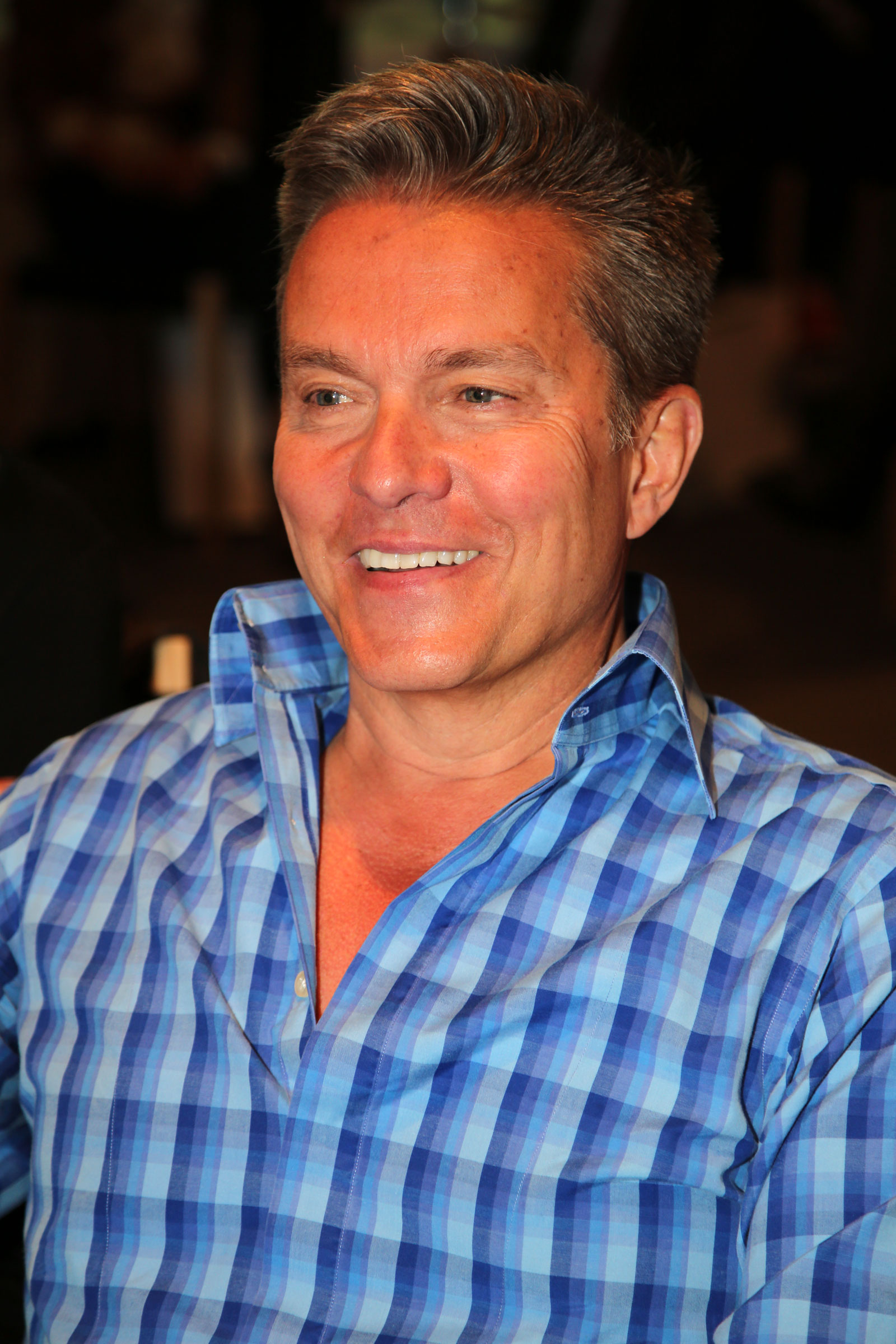
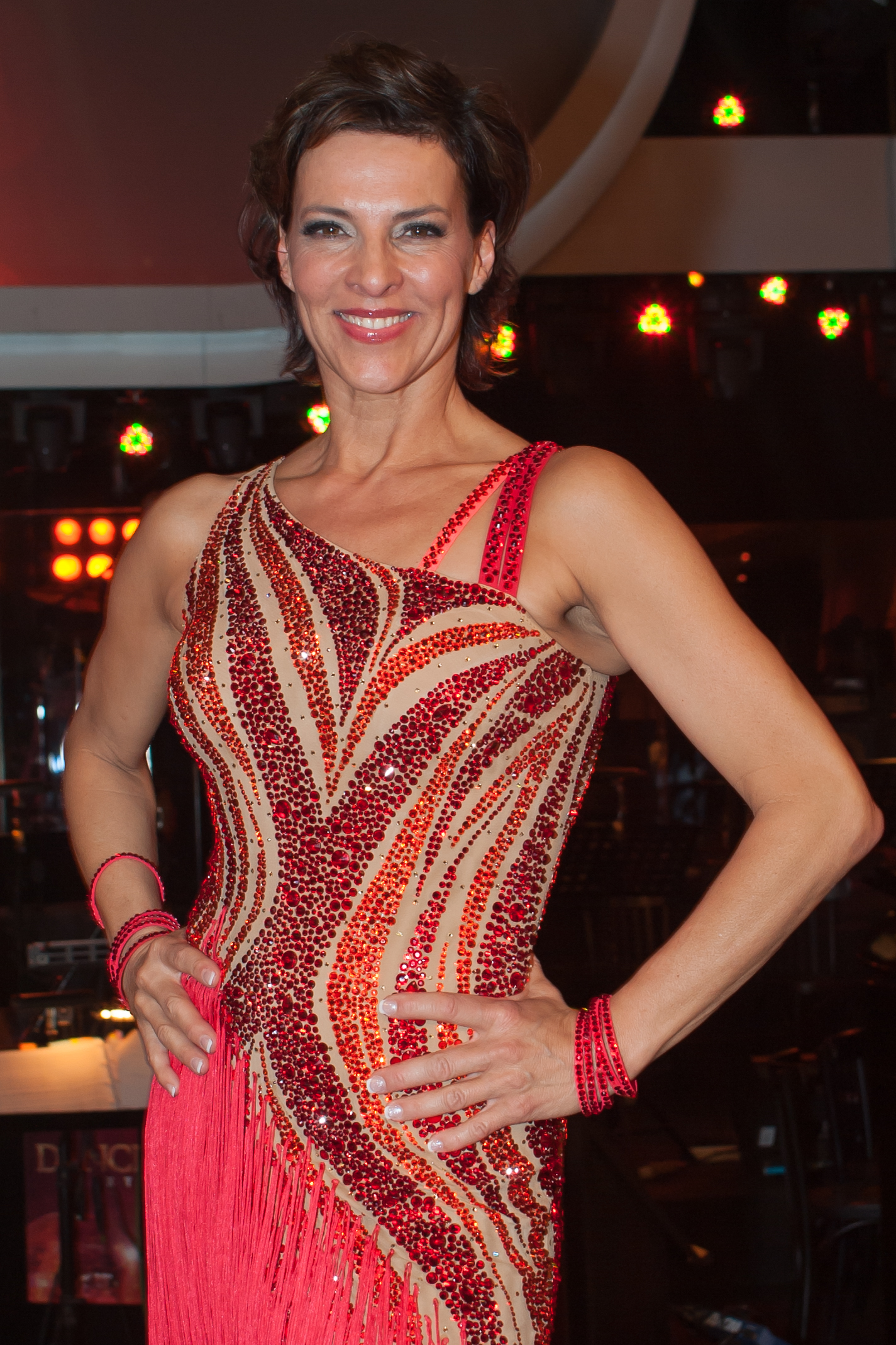
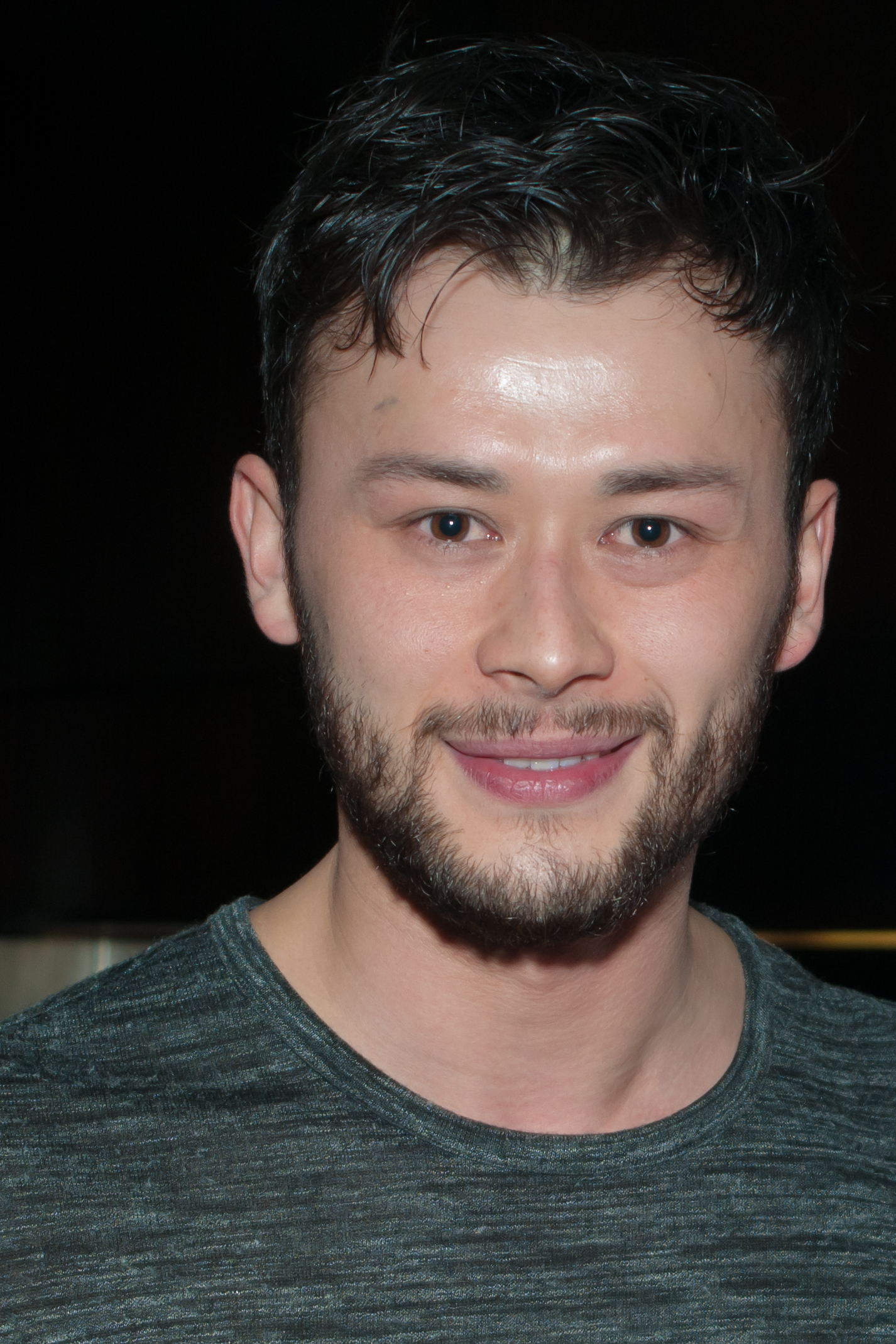
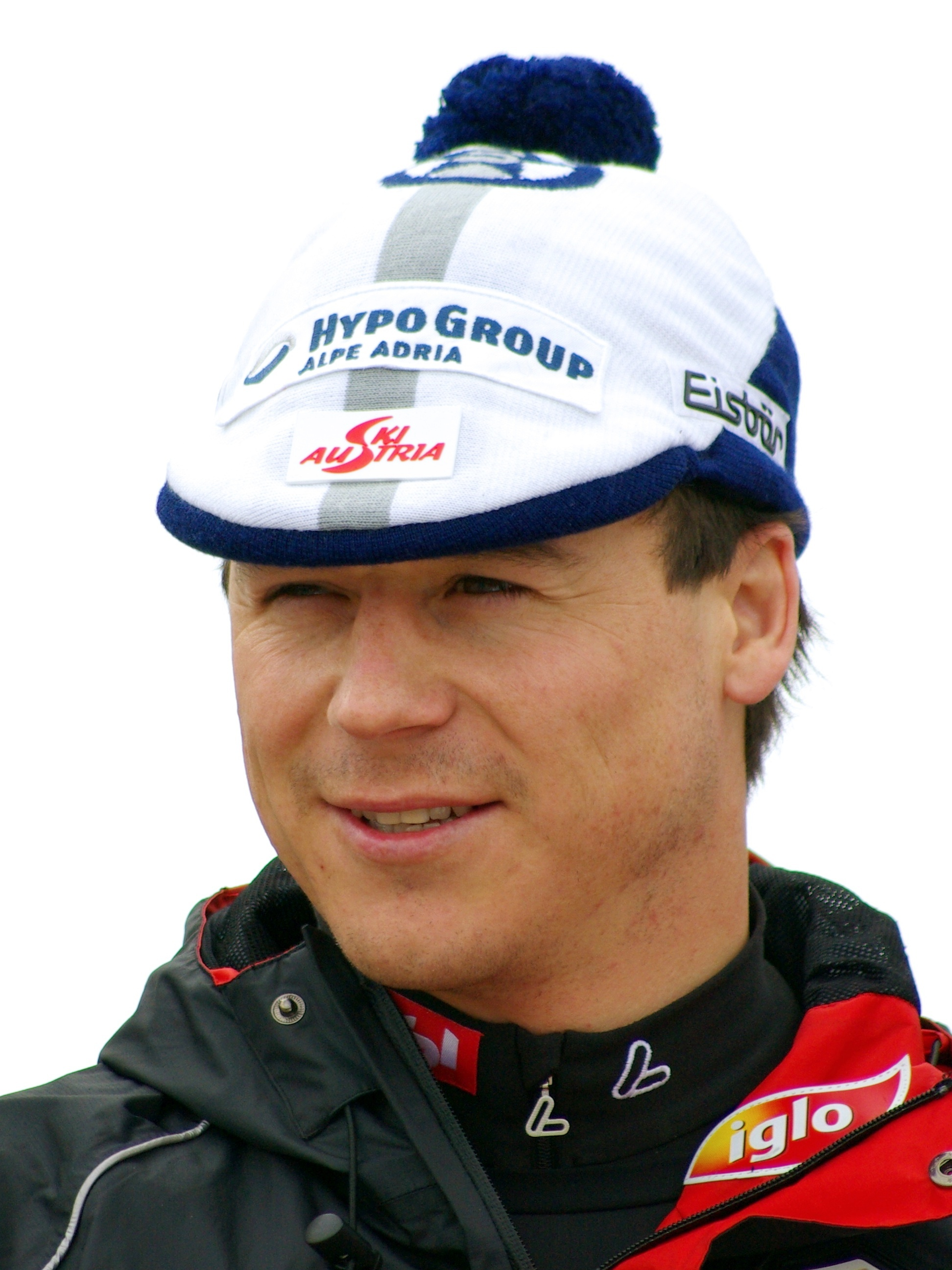
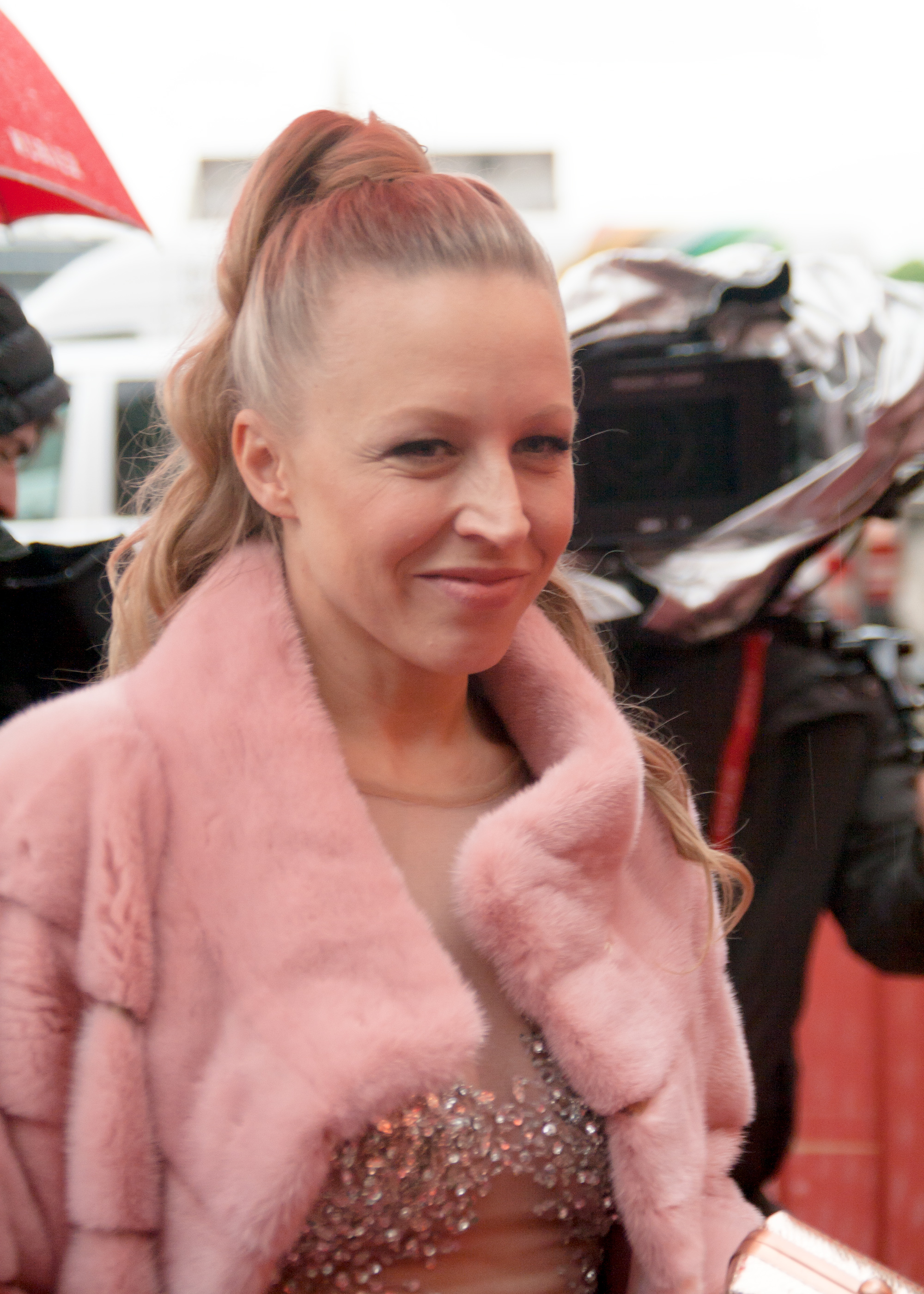
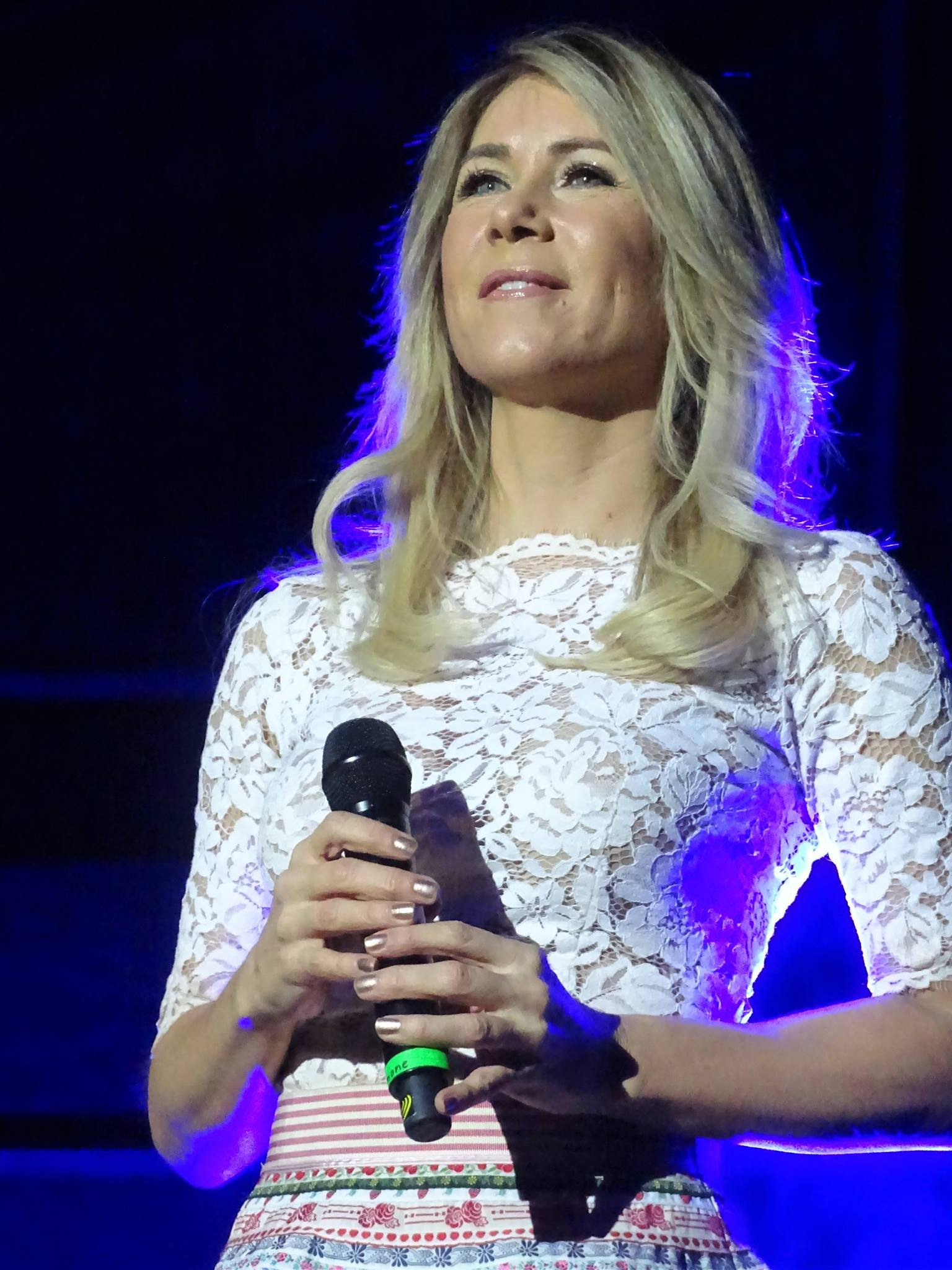
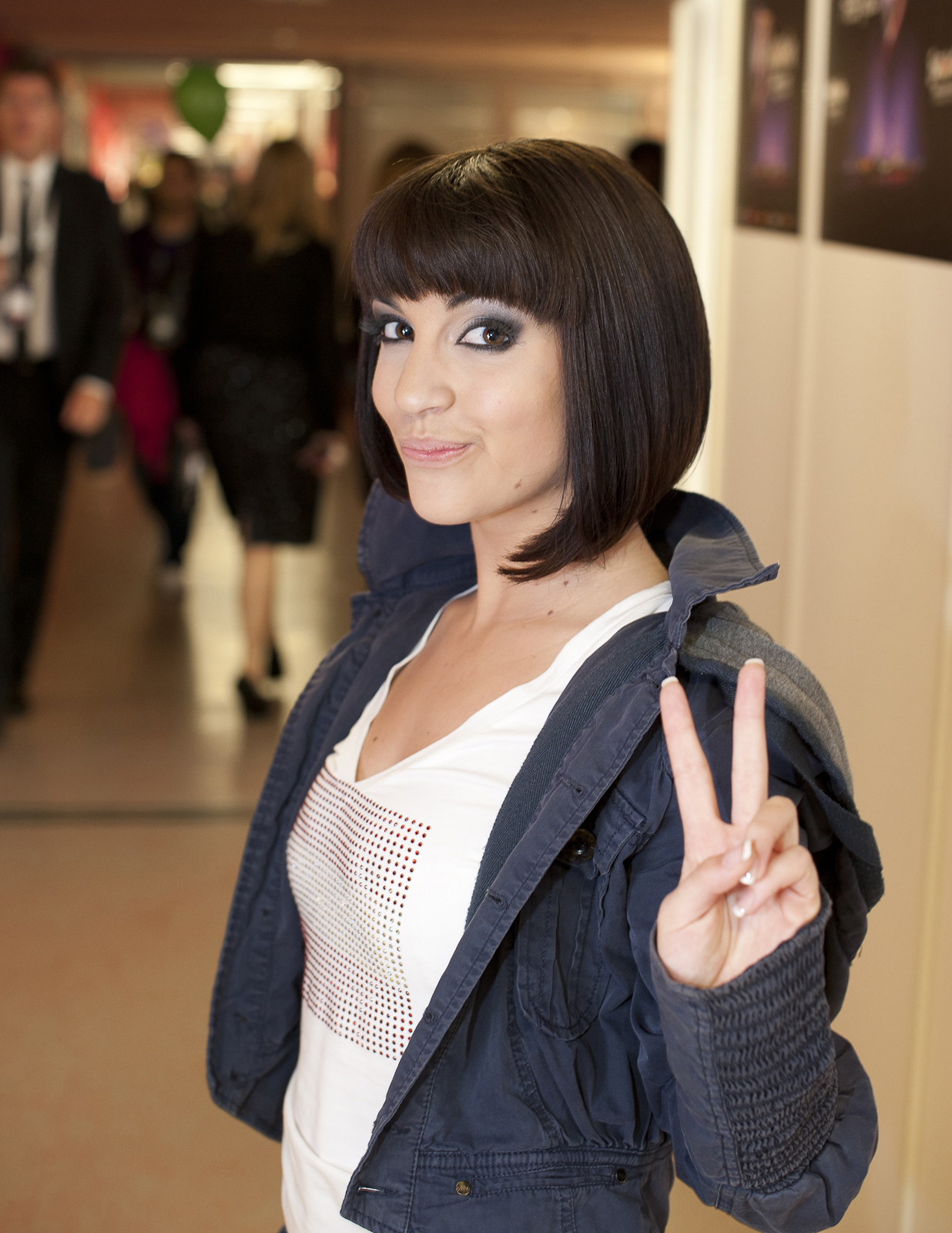
The celebrities who competed in the first season of The Masked Singer Austria, pictured in order of elimination (l-r):
James Cottriall ("Falcon"), Alfons Haider ("Ibex"), Sabine Petzl ("Cat"), Lukas Plöchl ("Climate Hero"), Rainer Schönfelder ("Carp"), Nina Proll ("Ghost Countess"), Simone Stelzer ("Lipizzaner"), Nadine Beiler ("Yeti").

== Episodes ==
=== Week 1 (14 March) ===
Performances on the first episode
#	Stage name	Song	Identity	Result
1	Falke	"Junge Roemer" by Falco	James Cottriall	OUT
2	Geistergräfin	"Take Me to Church" by Hozier	undisclosed	WIN
3	Karpfen	"Diamonds" by Rihanna	undisclosed	RISK
4	Katze	"Your Song" by Elton John	undisclosed	WIN
5	Klimaheld	"Formidable" by Stromae	undisclosed	WIN
6	Steinbock	"Girl, You'll Be a Woman Soon" by Neil Diamond	undisclosed	RISK
7	Lipizzaner	"Listen to Your Heart" by Roxette	undisclosed	WIN
8	Yeti	"Supergirl" by Reamonn	undisclosed	RISK

=== Week 2 (15 September) ===
Performances on the second episode
#	Stage name	Song	Identity	Result
1	Lipizzaner	"Ex's & Oh's" by Elle King	undisclosed	WIN
2	Steinbock	"The Final Countdown" by Europe	Alfons Haider	OUT
3	Geistergräfin	"No Time to Die" by Billie Eilish	undisclosed	WIN
4	Karpfen	"Lady Marmalade" by Labelle	undisclosed	WIN
5	Klimaheld	"Skinny Love" by Bon Iver	undisclosed	RISK
6	Yeti	"Mercy" by Duffy	undisclosed	WIN
7	Katze	"Memory" from Cats	undisclosed	RISK

=== Week 3 (22 September) ===
Performances on the third episode
#	Stage name	Song	Result	
1	Katze	"Ich will immer wieder... dieses Fieber spür'n" by Helene Fischer	RISK	
2	Lipizzaner	"Wrecking Ball" by Miley Cyrus	WIN	
3	Karpfen	"Ai Se Eu Te Pego" by Michel Teló	RISK	
4	Yeti	"Valerie" by The Zutons	WIN	
5	Geistergräfin	"Heart of Glass" by Blondie	WIN	
6	Klimaheld	"Out of the Dark" by Falco	RISK	
Sing-off details			Identity	Result
1	Katze	"Believe" by Cher	Sabine Petzl	OUT
2	Karpfen	"I Kissed a Girl" by Katy Perry	undisclosed	SAFE
3	Klimaheld	"Say Something" by A Great Big World	undisclosed	SAFE

=== Week 4 (29 September) ===
Performances on the fourth episode
#	Stage name	Song	Result	
1	Karpfen	"Alles nur geklaut" by Die Prinzen	RISK	
2	Klimaheld	"Fix You" by Coldplay	RISK	
3	Lipizzaner	"Man! I Feel Like a Woman!" by Shania Twain	WIN	
4	Geistergräfin	"It's a Man's Man's Man's World" by James Brown	RISK	
5	Yeti	"Rise Like a Phoenix" by Conchita Wurst	WIN	
Sing-off details			Identity	Result
1	Karpfen	"In the Ghetto" by Elvis Presley	undisclosed	SAFE
2	Klimaheld	"Love Me like You Do" by Ellie Goulding	Lukas Plöchl	OUT
3	Geistergräfin	"Because of You" by Kelly Clarkson	undisclosed	SAFE

=== Week 5 (6 October) ===
Performances on the fifth episode
#	Stage name	Song	Result	
1	Yeti	"Elastic Heart" by Sia feat. The Weeknd and Diplo	WIN	
2	Karpfen	"Faith" by George Michael	RISK	
3	Geistergräfin	"Because the Night" by Patti Smith Group	WIN	
4	Lipizzaner	"Bad Romance" by Lady Gaga	RISK	
Sing-off details			Identity	Result
1	Karpfen	"Just a Gigolo" by Louis Prima	Rainer Schönfelder	OUT
2	Lipizzaner	"L'amour toujours" by Gigi D'Agostino	undisclosed	SAFE

=== Week 6 (13 October) – Final ===
Group Number: "Everybody Needs Somebody to Love" by The Blues Brothers

==== Round One ====
Performances on the final live episode – round one
#	Stage name	Song	Identity	Result
1	Geistergräfin	"Cry Me a River" by Justin Timberlake	Nina Proll	THIRD
2	Lipizzaner	"Cordula Grün" by Josh.	undisclosed	SAFE
3	Yeti	"Creep" by Radiohead	undisclosed	SAFE

==== Round Two ====
Performances on the final live episode – round two
#	Stage name	Song	Identity	Result
1	Lipizzaner	"Wrecking Ball" by Miley Cyrus	Simone Stelzer	RUNNER-UP
2	Yeti	"Rise Like a Phoenix" by Conchita Wurst	Nadine Beiler	WINNER

== Reception ==
=== Ratings ===
Episode	Original airdate	Time slot	Viewers (in millions)		Share		Source
Episode	Original airdate	Time slot	Household	Adults 12-49	Household	Adults 12-49	Source
1	14 March 2020	Saturday 8:15 pm	0.311	0.236	–	18.3%	
2	15 September 2020	Tuesday 8:15 pm	0.182	0.125	–	12.4%	
3	22 September 2020	Tuesday 8:15 pm	0.141	0.086	–	8.8%	
4	29 September 2020	Tuesday 8:15 pm	0.175	0.101	–	9.8%	
5	6 October 2020	Tuesday 8:15 pm	0.183	0.099	–	9.3%	
6	13 October 2020	Tuesday 8:15 pm	0.292	0.166	–	16.1%	
