= Nazareth College (Michigan) =

Catholic college in Kalamazoo, US (1914–1992)

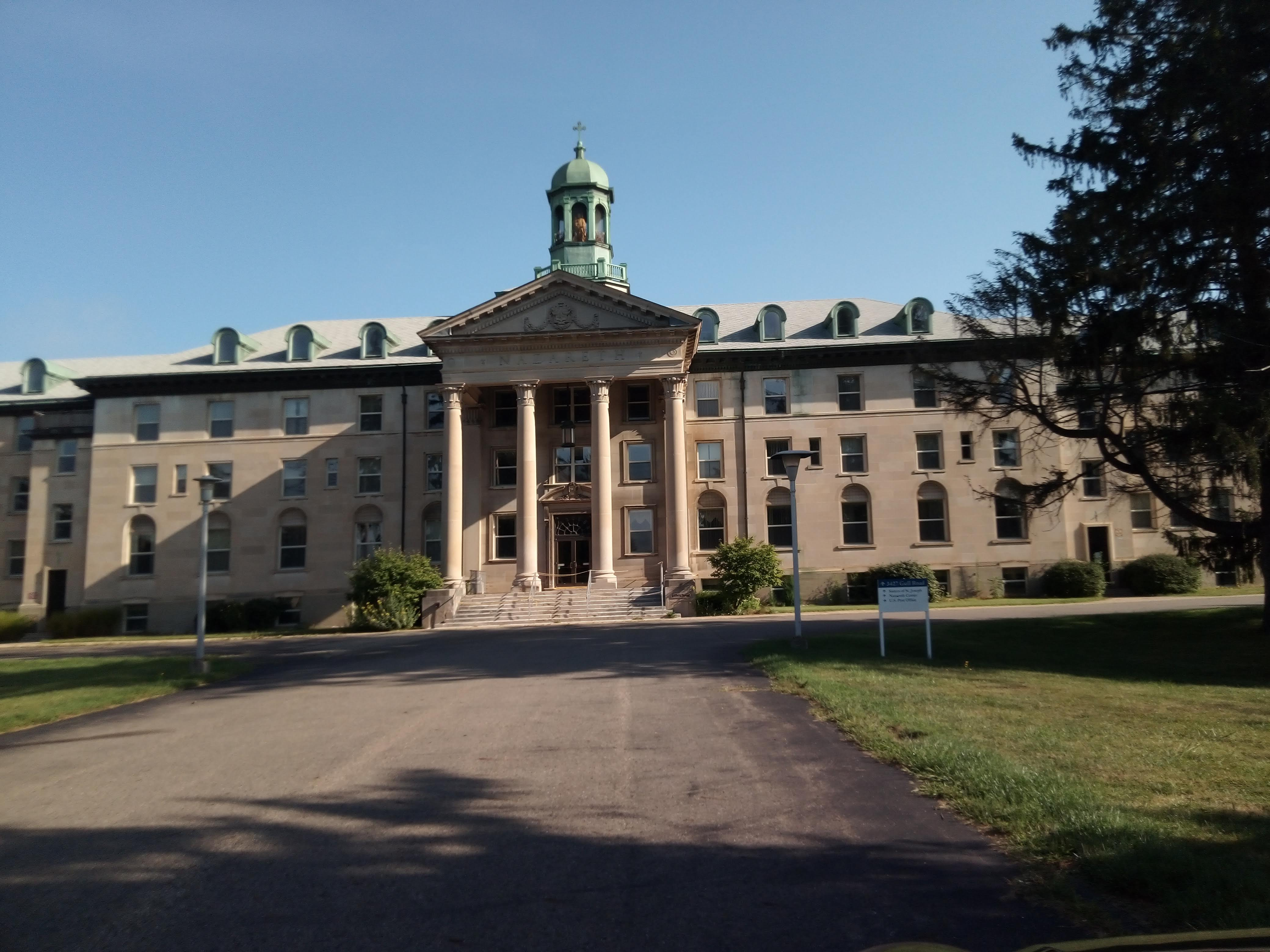
- Type: Private college
- Active: 1914–1992
- Religious affiliation: Roman Catholic (Sisters of St. Joseph of Nazareth)
- Location: Kalamazoo, Michigan, United States

Nazareth College was a private Catholic college in Kalamazoo, Michigan, United States. It operated from 1914 until 1992.

== Origins ==
Nazareth Academy opened in 1897 and received a charter from the State of Michigan which provided for the future extension of the school to the collegiate level. On May 7, 1913, Monsignor O’Brien announced the formation of the O’Brien scholarship and the opening of Nazareth College. In 1914, Margaret Packard became the first recipient of the O’Brien scholarship and Nazareth's first graduate in 1918 with a Bachelor of Arts degree. Sister Mary Celestine Connors served as Acting Dean of the college from 1918 to 1932 when she became the college's first President, a post she held until 1938.

== Chartering ==
Under the auspices of Bishop Michael J. Gallagher, of the Diocese of Detroit, Nazareth College was chartered in 1924 at Nazareth, Michigan by the Sisters of St. Joseph of Nazareth. At that time the college was granted its Articles of Incorporation by the State of Michigan as a four-year liberal arts college.

== Construction ==
A seven million dollar campus construction project was begun in the 1950s. In 1959, groundbreaking began on Albers Hall, named after Bishop Joseph Albers of the Diocese of Lansing, which by then was the local diocese. Construction began on Connors Hall in 1959. Originally named Immaculata Hall, it was renamed in honor of Sister Mary Celestine Connors, S.S.J. In 1962, the administration building was begun, closely followed by Dooley Hall in 1963, initially called Madonna Hall. The change of name was to honor the famed Naval officer, Dr. Tom Dooley, who had worked in refugee camps in South Vietnam during the Vietnam War and later went to Laos to help the people there. He received a Congressional Gold Medal posthumously for his humanitarian work in that country. Work on Dillon Hall and the library was completed in 1967.

The next major addition to the physical campus was the completion of the Athletic Center in 1989, though it was never truly finished. This provided the students with a much needed outlet for physical fitness and activities as well as contributing to the college sponsored varsity sports for men in soccer, basketball and baseball; and for women in volleyball, basketball and softball. It surely also contributed to the victory of the women's volleyball team in 1991 at nationals.

== Change in admissions ==
Under the Presidency of Sister Mary Bader (1962–1974), the decision was made in 1971 to admit men to the college, thus changing the campus culture forever. By the late 1980s, twenty-three undergraduate majors and two graduate programs were being offered. Nazareth College was also noted for its night and weekend classes designed to meet the needs working adult students. Off-campus programs were located at Glen Oaks Community College in Centerville, Lake Michigan College in Benton Harbor, and Kellogg Community College in Battle Creek.

== Degree offerings ==
In 1987 it offered bachelor's degree programs in: accounting, America studies, biology, business administration, computer information management, elementary education, English, fine arts, fine arts management, human services, learning disabilities, liberal studies, medical technology, natural science, nursing, pharmaceutical and medical services representative, pre-medical pre-dental and pre-veterinary, secondary education, social psychology, and social work.

== Closure ==
The Nazareth College Board of Trustees announced their decision to close the college in April 1991. The college closed slowly over the course of the next 18 months, allowing many students to finish their degrees. Ownership of the physical college campus reverted to the Sisters of Saint Joseph. The Sisters wanted to find a purpose for the buildings that fit with their mission of service. Connors, Dooley and Albers Halls have been leased to Kalamazoo County Health and Community Services Department. Borgess Medical Center purchased the athletic center and has converted it into Borgess Health and Fitness Center. A purpose for the administration building and the library could not be found and they were torn down in 1995 and 1996, respectively.

The college seal, that was inlaid in the main floor of the administration building, was saved and is now on display on the grounds of former campus. It is located on the west side of the main entrance road to Nazareth, close to where the administration building was.

== Notable alumni ==
- Joan Slager, nurse midwife and academic administrator
