= Slager =

Slager is a Dutch occupational surname meaning "butcher". Notable people with the surname include:

- Denzel Slager (born 1993), Dutch football striker
- Don Slager (born 1963), American corporate director
- Hal Slager (born ?), American (Indiana) Republican politician
- Joan Slager, American nurse midwife and academic administrator
- Johan Slager (1946–2025), Dutch rock guitarist
- Michael Slager (born 1981), American police officer who shot Walter Scott
- Mozes Slager (1880–1943), Dutch violinist
- Piet Slager Sr. (1841–1912), Dutch painter
- Rick Slager (born 1954), American football player

== See also ==
- Museum Slager, a museum showing the paintings of Piet Slager Sr. and seven of his descendants
