= Joan Slager =

American nurse midwife and academic administrator (born 1958)

- Born: 1958 (age 67–68)
- Education: Nazareth College; Case Western Reserve University; Oakland University
- Scientific career
- Fields: Nurse-midwifery, clinical coding
- Workplaces: Bronson Women’s Service; Frontier Nursing University

Joan K. Slager (born 1958) is an American nurse midwife and academic administrator serving the dean of nursing at Frontier Nursing University since 2018.

== Life ==
Slager was born in 1958. She earned a B.S.N. from Nazareth College in 1980. She completed a certificate in nurse midwifery via the nurse-midwifery education program at Frontier School of Midwifery and Family Nursing in 1991. Slager received a M.S.N. from Case Western Reserve University in 1993. She earned a doctorate in nursing practice from Oakland University in 2008. Her dissertation was titled, Investigating the Relationship of Postpartum Depression and Body Image Perception. Her doctoral advisors were Barbara E. Harrison and Kerri D. Schuiling.

Slager is a certified nurse-midwife. In 1993, she helped establish the Bronson Women's Service in Kalamazoo, Michigan. She became its director of practice in 1995 where she practiced midwifery for 21 years. Slager is a clinical coder who has expertise in medical billing. In 2007, she was named a fellow of the American College of Nurse-Midwives. At Frontier Nursing University (FNU), Slager was the program director of the doctor of nursing practice. She later served as the interim dean of nursing. An associate professor of nursing, she assumed the role of dean of nursing in March 2018. In 2020, Slager was inducted as a fellow of the American Academy of Nursing.
