= Simone Stelzer =

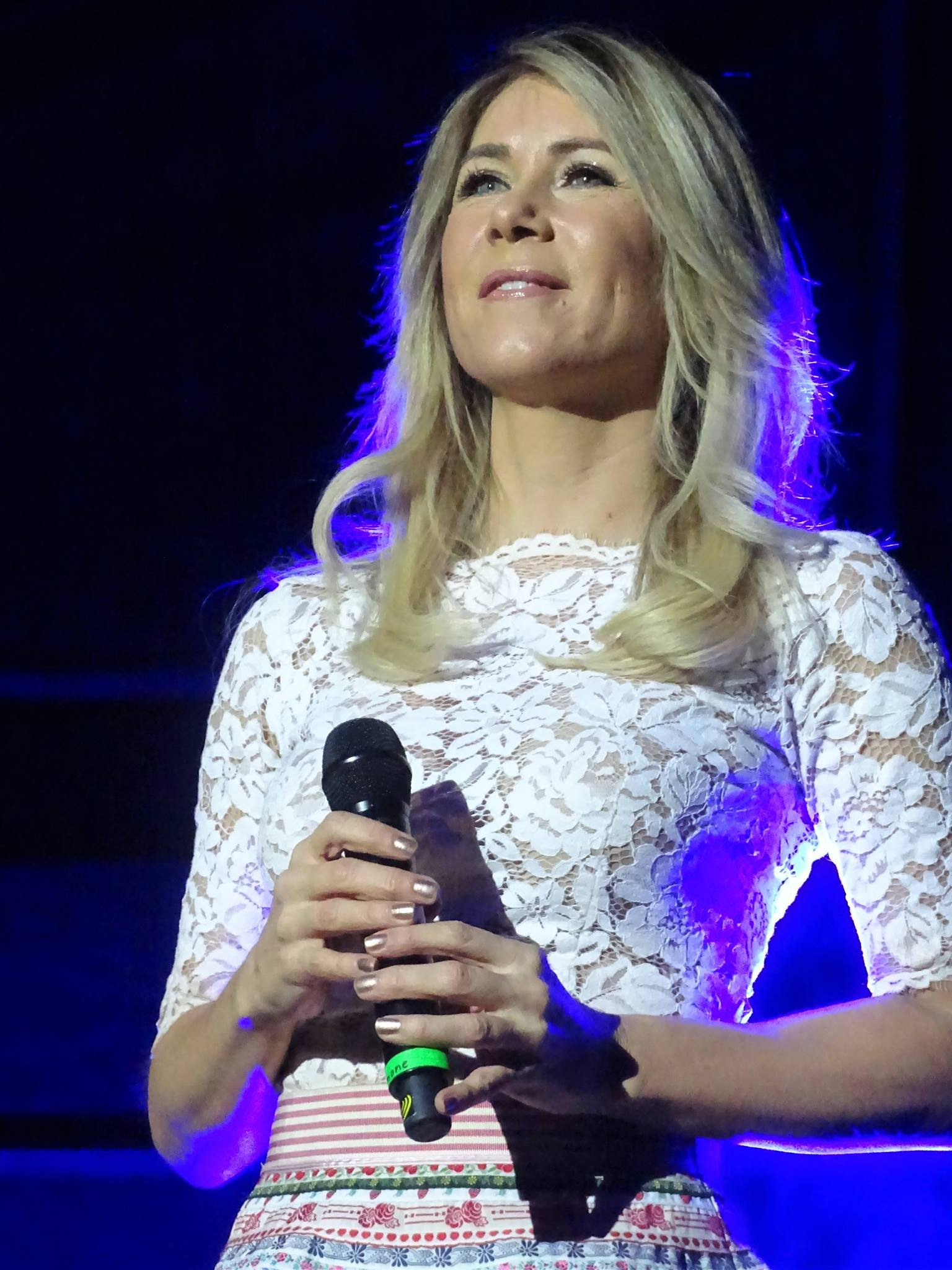
- Stelzer in 2016

Background information
- Born: 1 October 1969 (age 56); Vienna, Austria
- Occupations: Singer, songwriter

Simone Stelzer (born 1 October 1969) is an Austrian pop singer.

In 1990 she participated in "Ein Lied für Zagreb", the Austrian national final for the Eurovision Song Contest. Her song "Keine Mauern mehr" was initially placed second, however, several days after the final it was discovered that winning song "Das Beste" performed by Duett had participated in a German national final in 1988. Duett were therefore disqualified and Simone was announced as the Austrian Eurovision entrant. "Keine Mauern mehr" was placed tenth in the Eurovision Song Contest in Zagreb. Simone participated in the 1994 Austrian national final, "Ein Lied für Dublin", with the song "Radio", which was placed fourth.

== Discography ==
=== Studio albums ===
- [1990] Feuer Im Vulkan
- [1994] Gute Reise (bon voyage)
- [1996] Ich liebe Dich
- [1998] Aus Liebe
- [1999] Träume
- [2001] Solang wir lieben
- [2003] Ganz nah
- [2005] Schwerelos
- [2006] Das Beste und mehr
- [2009] Morgenrot
- [2010] Mondblind
- [2012] Pur
- [2013] Das kleine große Leben (Duet with Charly Brunner)
- [2015] Alles geht! (Duet with Charly Brunner)
- [2015] 25 Jahre Simone – Die ultimative Best of

=== Singles ===
- [1994] Wahre Liebe
- [1994] Josie
- [1996] Heute Nacht
- [1996] Wahre Liebe wartet
- [1998] Nimm mich einfach in den Arm ...
- [1998] Ich lieb dich oder nicht
- [1998] Denn es war ihr Lachen (Sayonara)
- [2000] Verlier mein Herz nicht, wenn du gehst
- [2000] Ich muss dich wiedersehn
- [2000] Solang wir lieben
- [2007] Alles durch die Liebe (Duet with Bernhard Brink)
- [2008] 1000 mal geträumt
- [2009] Ich hätt ja gesagt
- [2009] Die Nacht als sie fortlief
- [2009] Morgenrot
- [2010] Halt mich ein letztes mal
- [2010] Sehnsucht kommt nicht von ungefähr
- [2011] Ich möcht niemals Deine Tränen sehn
- [2012] Wenn Du gehst
- [2012] Ich denk noch an Dich (Duet with Charly Brunner)
- [2012] Heisskalter Engel
- [2013] Das kleine große Leben (Duet with Charly Brunner)
- [2015] Buongiorno Amore (Duet with Charly Brunner)
- [2015] Arche Noah (Duet with Charly Brunner)
- [2016] Woher weiß ich das es Liebe ist (Duet with Charly Brunner)
- [2016] Das kann uns keiner nehmen (Duet with Charly Brunner)
- [2016] Nur für den Moment (Duet with Charly Brunner)
- [2017] Wahre Liebe (Duet with Charly Brunner)
- [2018] Nachtschwärmer (Duet with Charly Brunner)
- [2018] Die Tage enden nicht am Horizont (Duet with Charly Brunner)
- [2018] Traumtänzer (Duet with Charly Brunner)
- [2018] Kompass für mein Herz (Duet with Charly Brunner)
- [2019] Leichtes Spiel

Preceded by Thomas Forstner	Austria in the Eurovision Song Contest; 1990	Succeeded by Thomas Forstner
