= Culture of Austria =

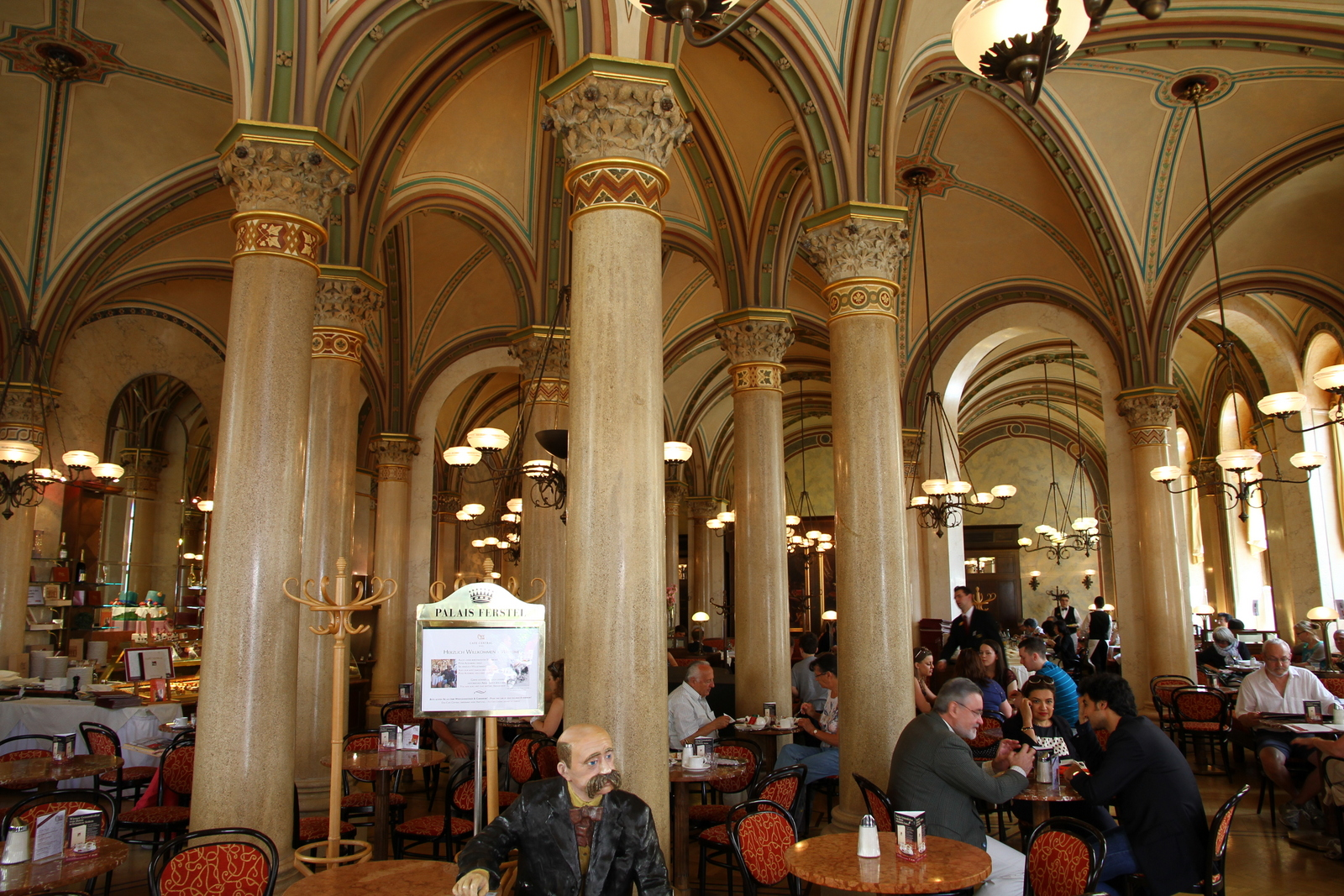
Café Central, a Viennese coffee house established in the 19th century

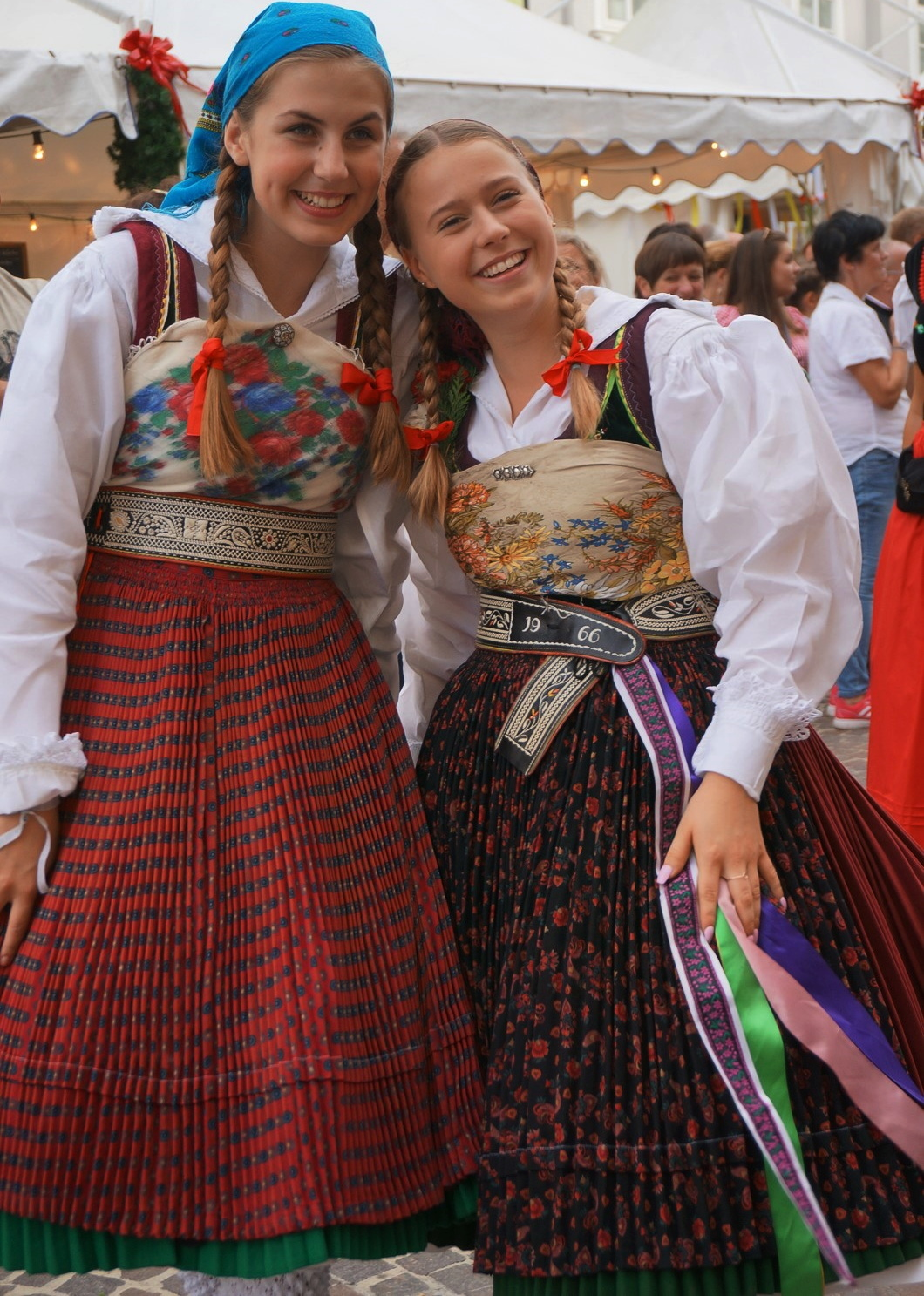
Folk clothing of the Gailtal Alps

Austrian culture is characterised by historical and modern influences, including a history of interaction primarily between Celtic, Roman, Slavic and Germanic peoples. Austria is particularly known for its classical music, folk music, baroque architecture, coffee culture, winter sports and Alpine traditions.

Austria is historically a strongly Catholic country, having been the centre of the Habsburg monarchy (1273–1918) which championed Catholicism. Austrian German is the dominant language in Austria, although the region historically had a diverse linguistic landscape.

In the 18th and 19th centuries, Austria was one of the centres of European musical life with the First Viennese School, which is reflected not only in the large number of musicians and composers associated with the country, but also in a large number of opera houses, theatres and orchestras that still exist today, as well as diverse musical traditions such as the Vienna New Year's Concert, numerous festivals and a vibrant cabaret scene.

== Music ==
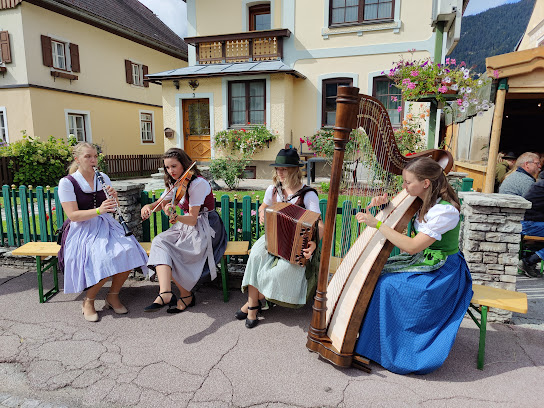
Austrian folk music band in Aich

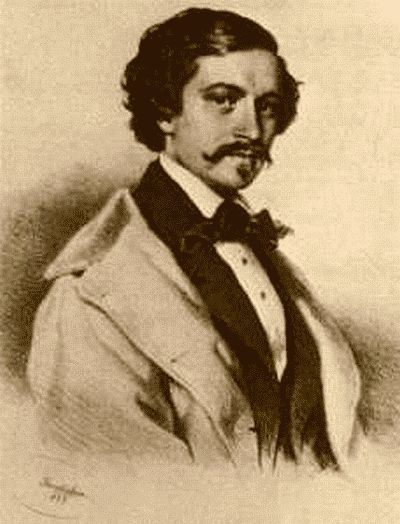
Johann Strauss, Jr

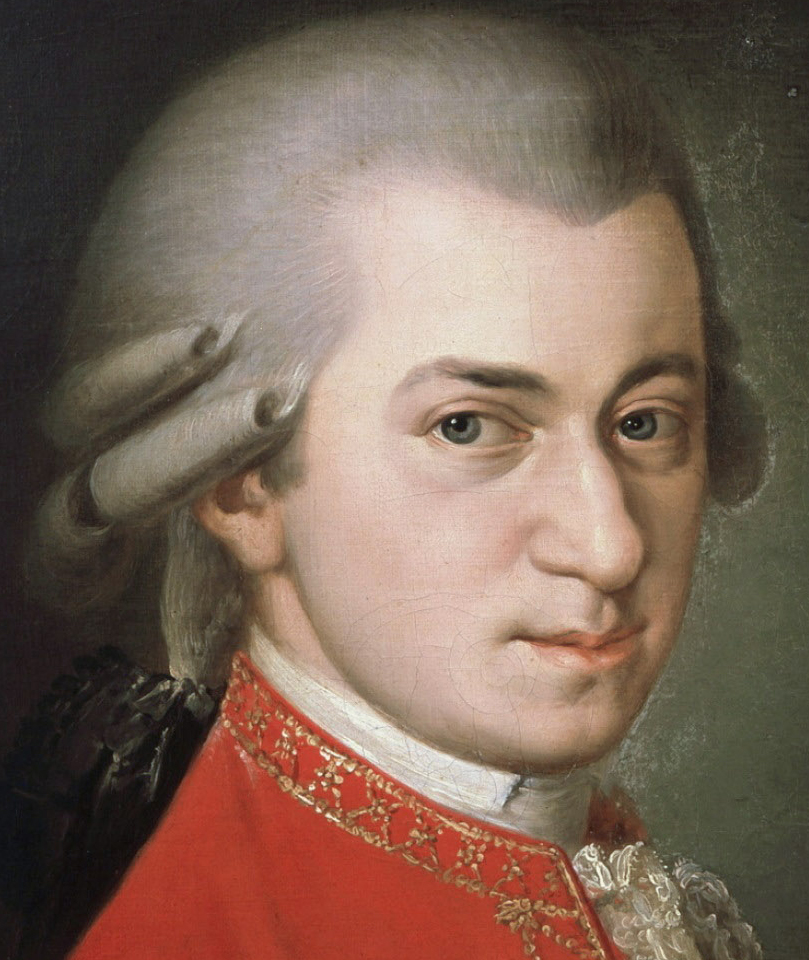
Mozart, by Barbara Krafft (1764–1825)

Vienna, the capital city of Austria, has long been an important centre of musical innovation. Composers of the 18th and 19th centuries were drawn to the city by the patronage of the Habsburgs, and made Vienna the European capital of classical music. Wolfgang Amadeus Mozart, Ludwig van Beethoven, and Johann Strauss, Jr., among others, were associated with the city. During the Baroque period, Czech and Hungarian folk forms influenced Austrian music. Vienna's status began its rise as a cultural center in the early 16th century, and was focused around instruments including the lute.

=== Classical music ===
During the 18th century, the classical-music era dominated European classical music, and the city of Vienna was an especially important place for musical innovation. Three composers arose, making lasting innovations: Ludwig van Beethoven's symphonic patterns, Wolfgang Amadeus Mozart's balance between melody and form, and Joseph Haydn's development of the string quartet and sonata.

==== Vienna Philharmonic ====
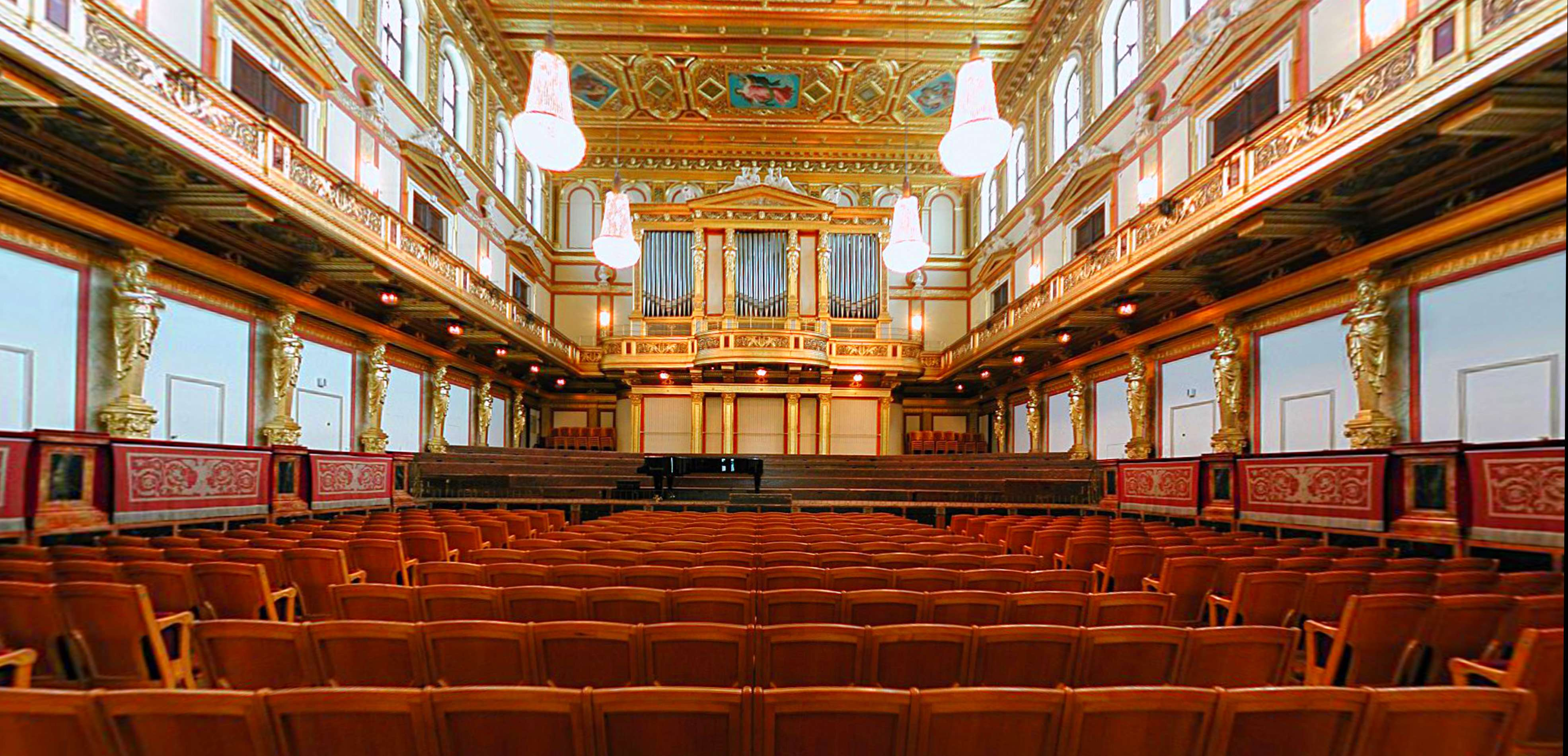
Golden Hall, from which the Vienna New Year's concert is broadcast

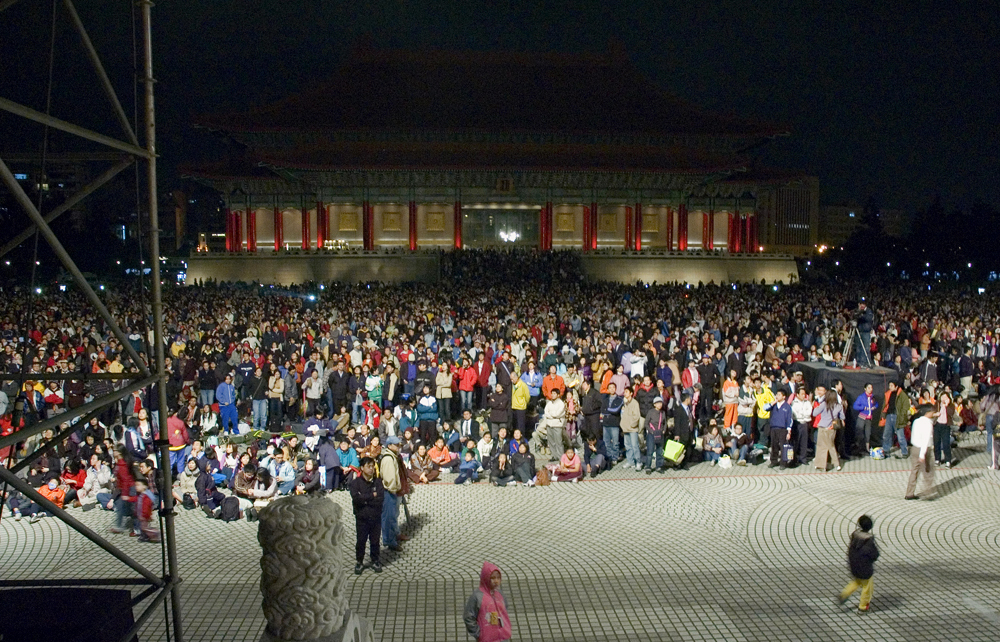
An overflow crowd watches the simultaneous outdoor broadcast of a performance in National Concert Hall by the Vienna Philharmonic conducted by Simon Rattle.

The Musikverein in Vienna is considered to be one of the three finest concert halls in the world and was opened on January 6, 1870. Since 1939, the famous Vienna New Year's Concert of the Vienna Philharmonic is broadcast from its Golden Hall to an audience of one billion in 44 countries. The members of the Vienna Philharmonic, which is regularly considered one of the finest orchestras in the world, are chosen from the orchestra of the Vienna State Opera.

The Vienna Philharmonic can trace its origins to 1842, when Otto Nicolai formed the Philharmonische Academie. This orchestra took all its decisions by a democratic vote of all its members, and these are principles still held today.

==== Vienna State Opera ====
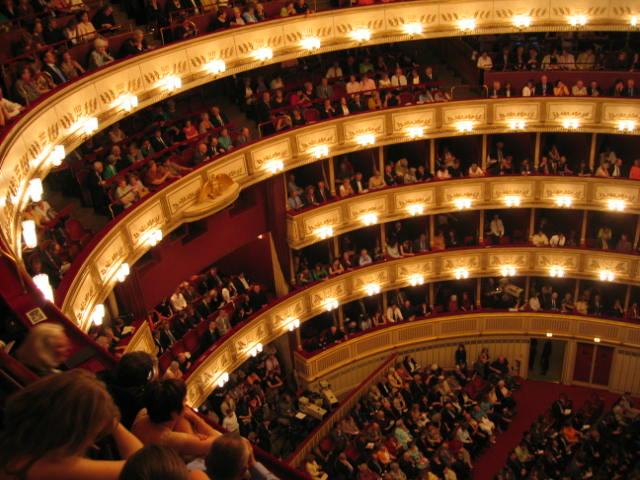
Vienna State Opera

The Vienna State Opera, in German called Staatsoper, is one of the most important opera companies in the world. It employs over 1000 people, and in 2008, the annual operating budget of the Staatsoper was 100 million Euros with slightly more than 50% coming in the form of a state subsidy.

It is also venue for the Vienna Opera Ball, an event that takes place on the Thursday preceding Ash Wednesday. The Opera Ball was first held 1936, and has seen up to 12,000 visitors. 180 pairs are opening the ball officially, before the command "Alles Walzer", based on a tradition of Johann Strauss Jr., the dance floor is opened for everyone.

==== Vienna Boys' Choir ====
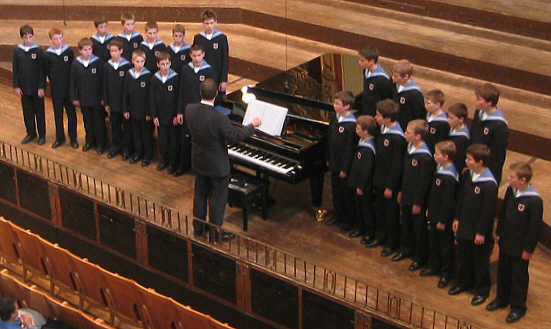
Wiener Sängerknaben (Vienna Boys' Chorus) during a concert at the Wiener Musikverein

The Vienna Boys' Choir (German: Wiener Sängerknaben) is one of the best known boys' choirs in the world. Known for its exceedingly high vocal standard, the choir has worked with musicians including Wolfgang Amadeus Mozart, Antonio Caldara, Antonio Salieri and Anton Bruckner.

The choir was established by a letter written by Maximilian I of Habsburg on 30 June 1498. Palais Augarten serves as rehearsal space and boarding school for the boys of the choir.

=== Folk Music ===
==== Schrammelmusik ====
The most popular form of modern Austrian folk music is Viennese Schrammelmusik, which is played with an accordion and a double-necked guitar. Modern performers include Roland Neuwirth, Karl Hodina, and Edi Reiser.

==== Yodeling ====
Yodeling is a type of throat singing that was developed in the Alps. In Austria, it was called juchazn and featured the use of both nonlexical syllables and yells that were used to communicate across mountains.

==== Austrian folk dancing ====
Austrian folk dancing is mostly associated with Schuhplattler, Ländler, Polka, or Waltz. However, there are other dances, such as Zwiefacher, Kontratänze, and Sprachinseltänze.

==== Ländler ====
The ländler is a folk dance of uncertain origin. Known as a folk song under several names for a long period, it became known as Landl ob der Enns, which was eventually shortened to ländler. The dance became popular in about 1720. It required close contact between members of the opposite sex, and was thus denounced as lustful by some church authorities. Ländlers were brought first to Vienna, and later to places as far away as Ukraine. The ländler eventually evolved into what is known as the waltz.

=== Austropop ===
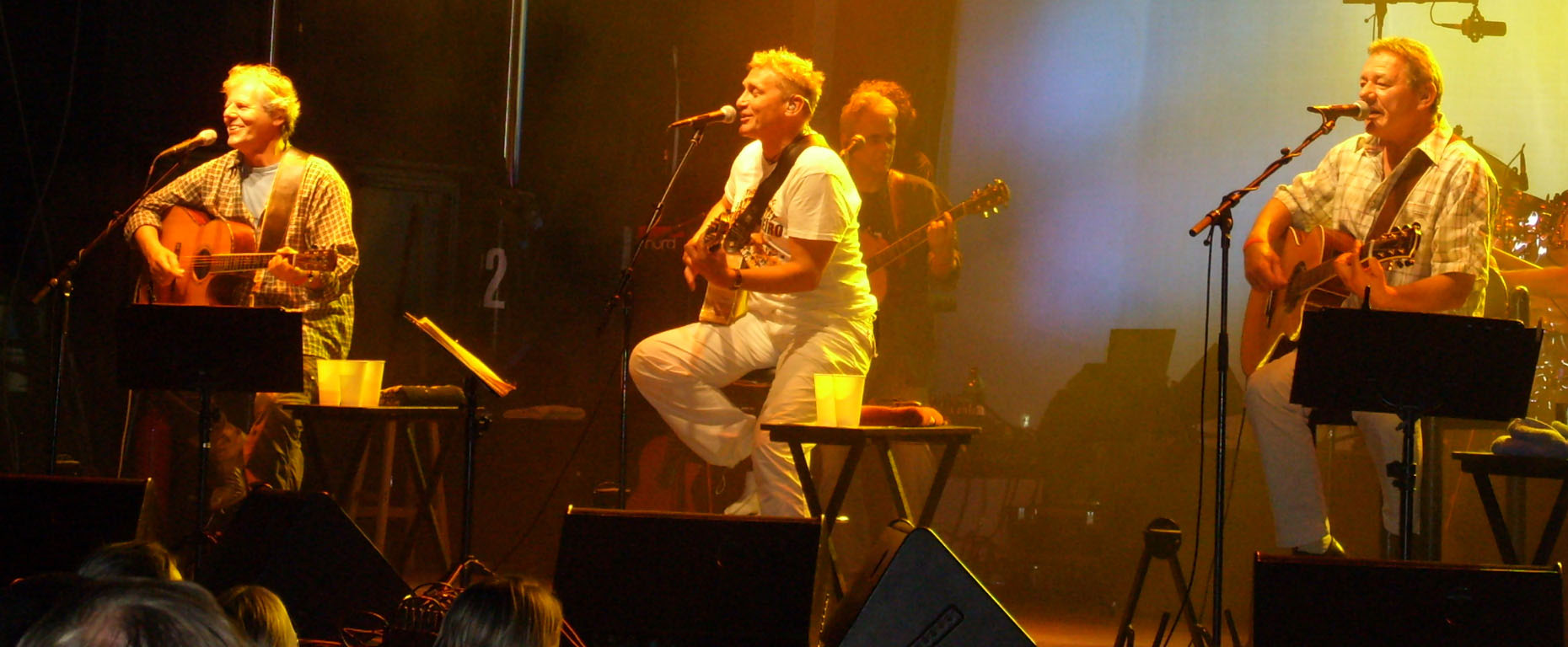
Austria3 - from left: Georg Danzer, Rainhard Fendrich, Wolfgang Ambros.

DJ Ötzi received the Amadeus Austrian Music Award in 2001 and 2002 for being the Austrian artist most successful internationally. The beatboxing group Bauchklang received an Amadeus in 2002 in the category group pop/rock national. Falco, Rainhard Fendrich, André Heller, Georg Danzer and Christina Stürmer all received Amadeus Awards in the category artist pop/rock national.

Austria3 was a conglomerate of three Austrian quite individualist singer-songwriters Wolfgang Ambros, Georg Danzer and Rainhard Fendrich, on stage from 1997 to 2006.

Starting around 2010, the "Neue Österreichische Welle" (New Austrian Wave) is gaining popularity. Its contributors are, for example, Nino Aus Wien, Bilderbuch, Wanda, Kreisky, Voodoo Jürgens, Schmieds Puls. From around 2015 on, the Austrian Cloud Rap scene starts to grow. It is represented most notably by Crack Ignaz and Yung Hurn.

=== Alpine New Wave ===
This genre of punk rock, whose name may be shortened to Alpunk, originated in the Alpine regions of Germany, Switzerland, and Austria. Alpunk fuses the chaotic, energetic rhythms of punk music with the accordion-based folk music that the region is famous for.

=== Misconceptions ===
Apparently, the musical The Sound of Music and the film based on it played a role in shaping how mainly the English speaking world sees Austria in terms of music. It has to be said that some of the arrangements in The Sound of Music have been done for the purpose of art, rather than for the purpose of giving a realistic view on Austrian music culture. So for example there is the view that the song "Edelweiss' is actually the national anthem of Austria, which is not the case. Moreover, the Ländler performed in the movie is not a traditional Ländler.

== Literature ==
Austrian literature can be divided into two main divisions, namely the period up until the mid 20th century, and the period subsequent, after both the Austro-Hungarian and German empires were gone. Austria went from being a major European power, to being a small country. In addition, there is a body of literature that some would deem Austrian but is not written in German.

Austria was home to novelists Arthur Schnitzler, Stefan Zweig, Thomas Bernhard, and Robert Musil, and of poets Georg Trakl, Franz Werfel, Franz Grillparzer, Rainer Maria Rilke, and Adalbert Stifter. Famous contemporary Austrian playwrights and novelists include Elfriede Jelinek and Peter Handke.

== Architecture ==
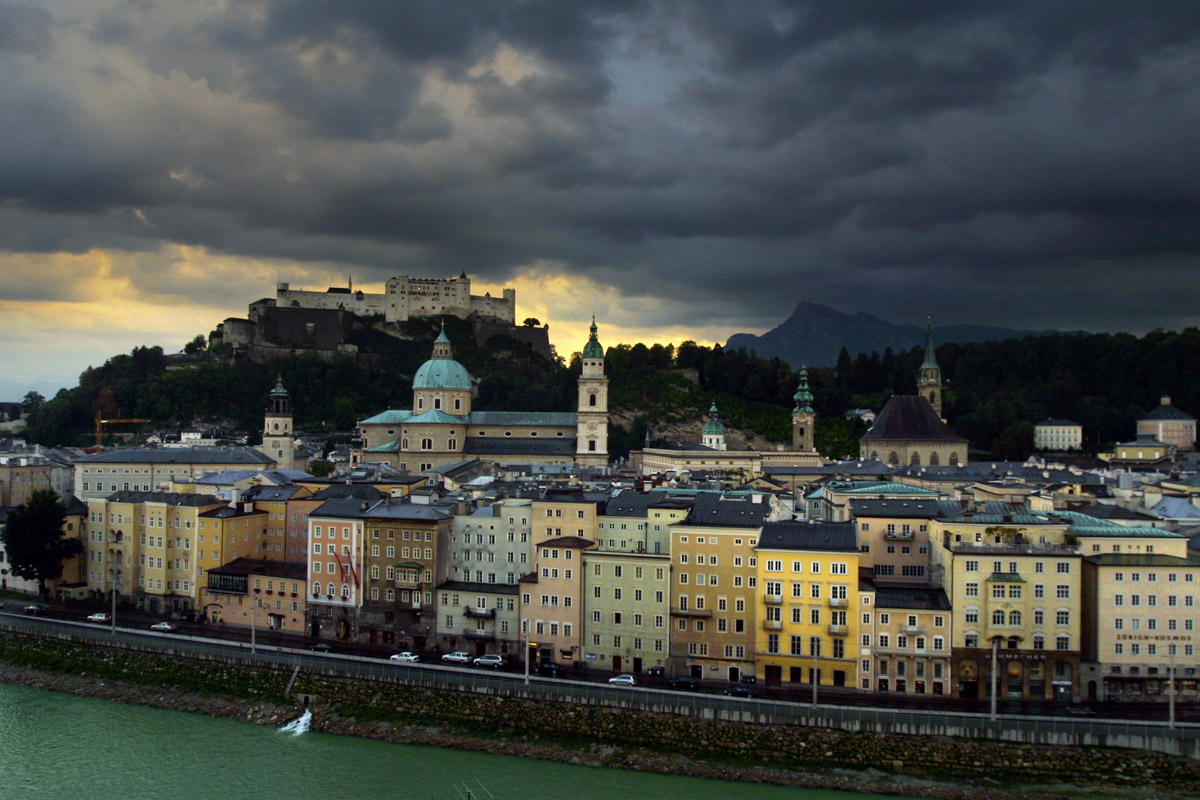
Salzburg old city

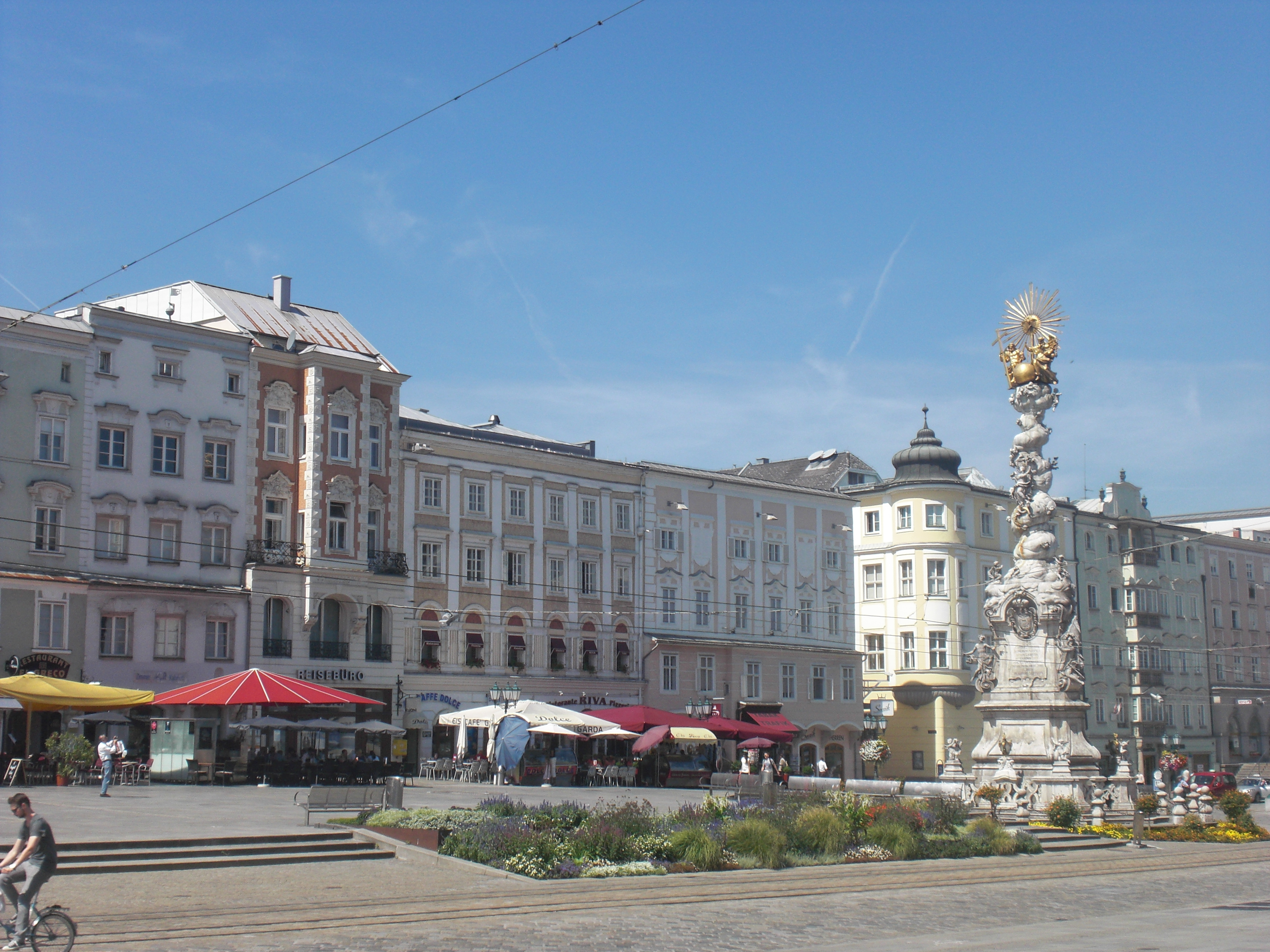
Linz, part of main square

Austria is famous for its castles, palaces and buildings, among other architectural works. Some of Austria's most famous castles include Festung Hohensalzburg, Burg Hohenwerfen, Castle Liechtenstein, and the Schloß Artstetten. Many of Austria's castles were created during the Habsburg reign.

The Historic Centre of the City of Salzburg was listed as a World Heritage Site in 1996, stating that "Salzburg has managed to preserve an extraordinarily rich urban fabric, developed over the period from the Middle Ages to the 19th century when it was a city-state ruled by a prince-archbishop."

Three years later, the City of Graz - Historic Centre followed Salzburg, as the "old city is a harmonious blend of the architectural styles and artistic movements that have succeeded each other since the Middle Ages, together with cultural influences from the neighbouring regions."

In 2001, finally the Historic Centre of Vienna was listed as World Heritage Site, with the comment that the "historic centre of Vienna is rich in architectural ensembles, including Baroque castles and gardens, as well as the late-19th-century Ringstrasse lined with grand buildings, monuments and parks."

Although not listed as World Heritage Site many other cities in Austria have a well-preserved Historic Centre, such as Linz or Innsbruck.

=== Cathedrals ===
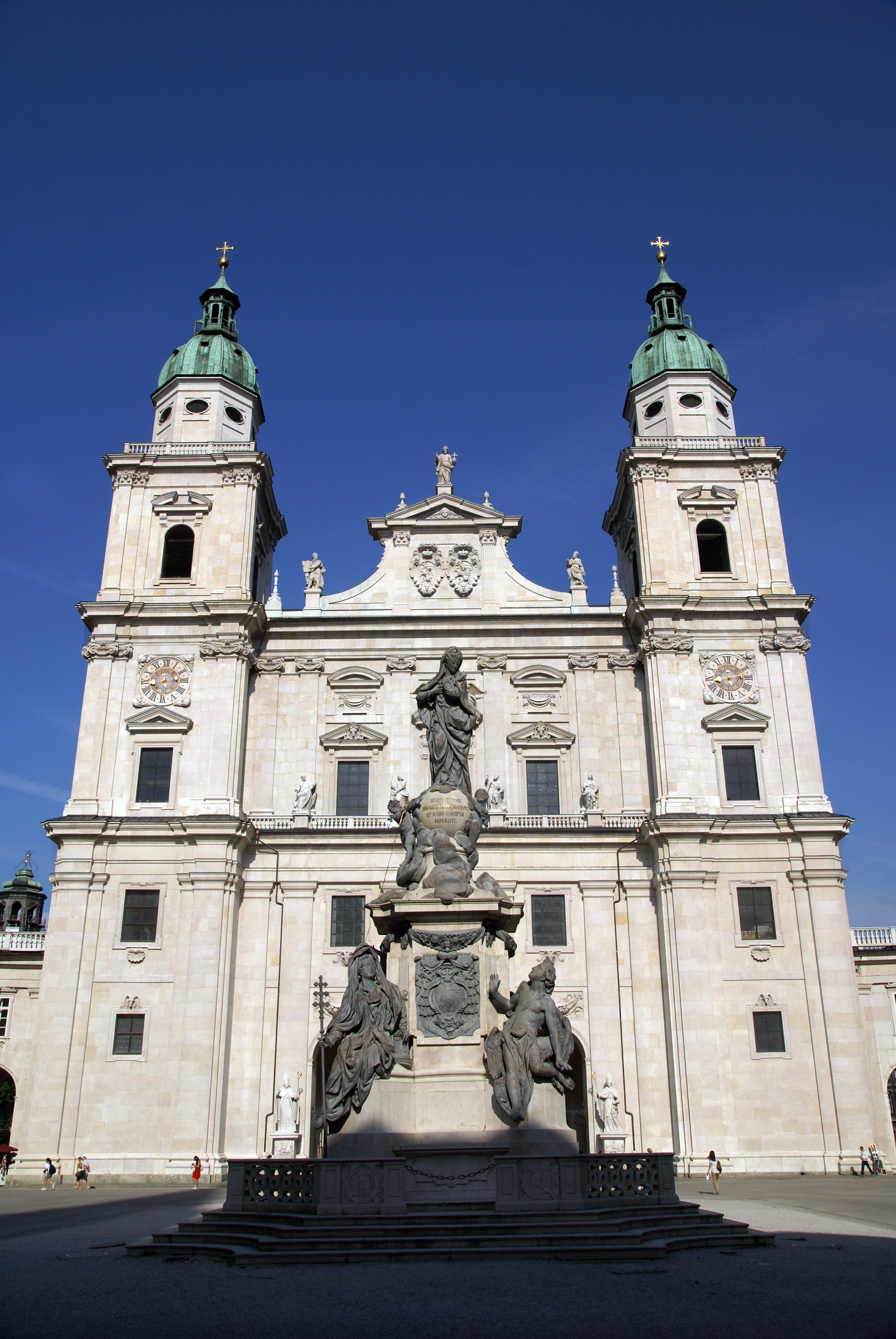
Salzburg Cathedral

Austria is rich in Roman Catholic tradition. One of Austria's oldest cathedrals is the Minoritenkirche in Vienna. It was built in the Gothic style in the year 1224. One of the world's tallest cathedrals, the 136-meter-tall (446-foot-tall) Stephansdom is the seat of the Archbishop of Vienna; the Stephansdom is 107 meters (351 feet) long and 34 meters (112 feet) wide. The St. Martin's Church in Linz was for a long time the oldest preserved church in Austria (first documented mention in 799); according to recent research, the current floor plan is from the 10th or 11th Century (Romanesque style). The New Cathedral, also located in Linz, is the largest (130 meters (430 feet) long, and the ground 5,170 square meters (55,600 square feet)) cathedral in Austria.

=== Palaces ===
Schönbrunn

Two of the most famous Austrian palaces are the Belvedere and Schönbrunn. The baroque-style Belvedere palace was built in the period 1714–1723, by Prince Eugene of Savoy, and now is home to the Österreichische Galerie Belvedere. Schönbrunn palace was built in 1696 by Johann Bernhard Fischer von Erlach for Emperor Leopold I; empress Maria Theresa of Austria ordered the palace restyled in Rococo. In 1996, it was added to the United Nations' World Cultural Heritage list.

=== Cemeteries ===
Austria is also known for its cemeteries. Vienna has fifty different cemeteries, of which the Zentralfriedhof is the most famous. The Habsburgs are buried in the Imperial Crypt.

=== Stift Melk ===
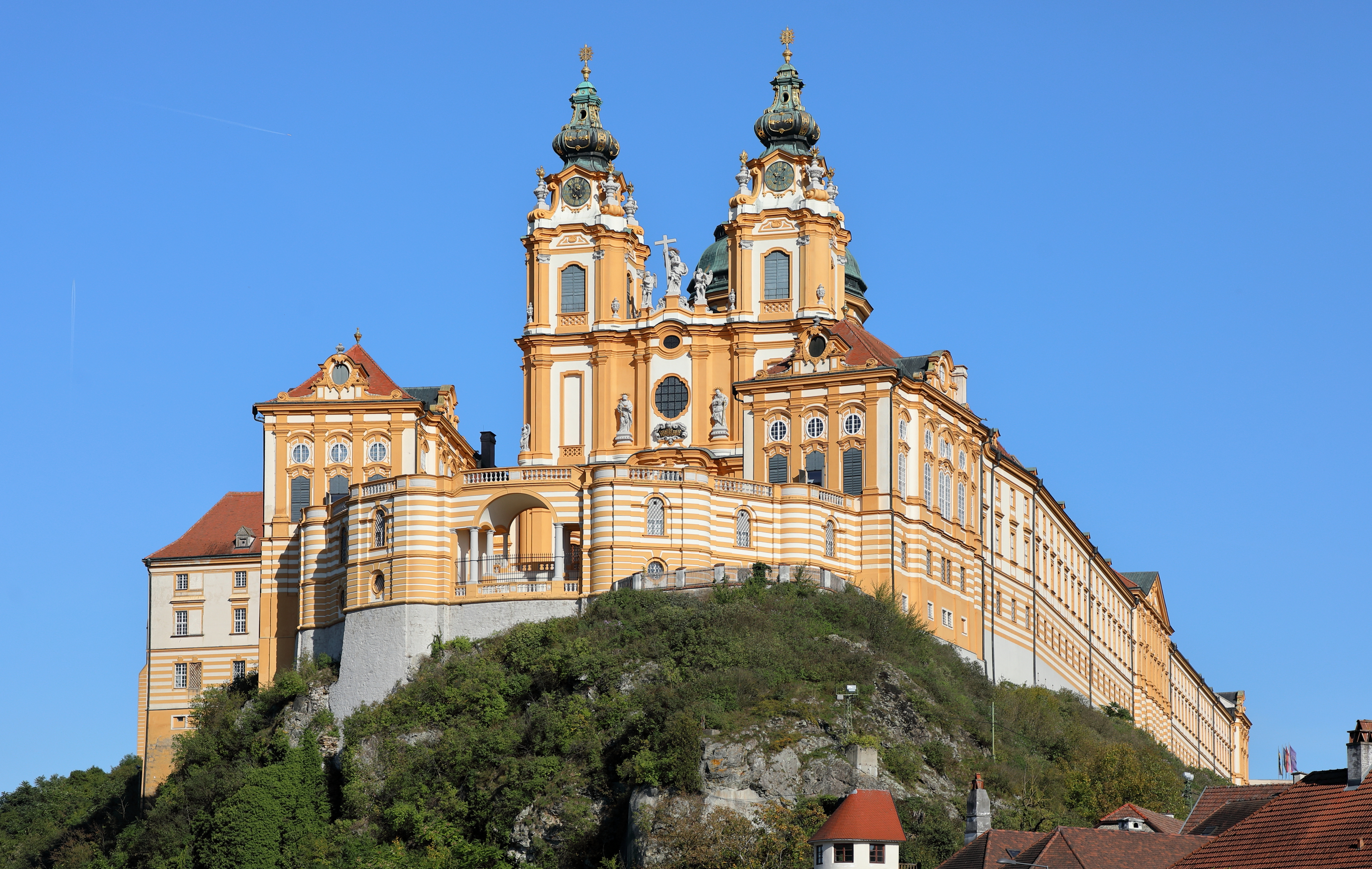
Stift Melk

Stift Melk is a Benedictine abbey in the federal state of Lower Austria, overlooking the Danube as it flows through the Wachau Valley. The abbey was formed in 1089 on a rock above the city of Melk.

=== Semmering Railway ===
The Semmering Railway, a famous engineering project constructed in the years 1848–1854, was the first European mountain railway built with a standard-gauge track. Still fully functional, it is now part of the Austrian Southern Railway. It was appointed a World Heritage Site in 1998.

== Visual art ==
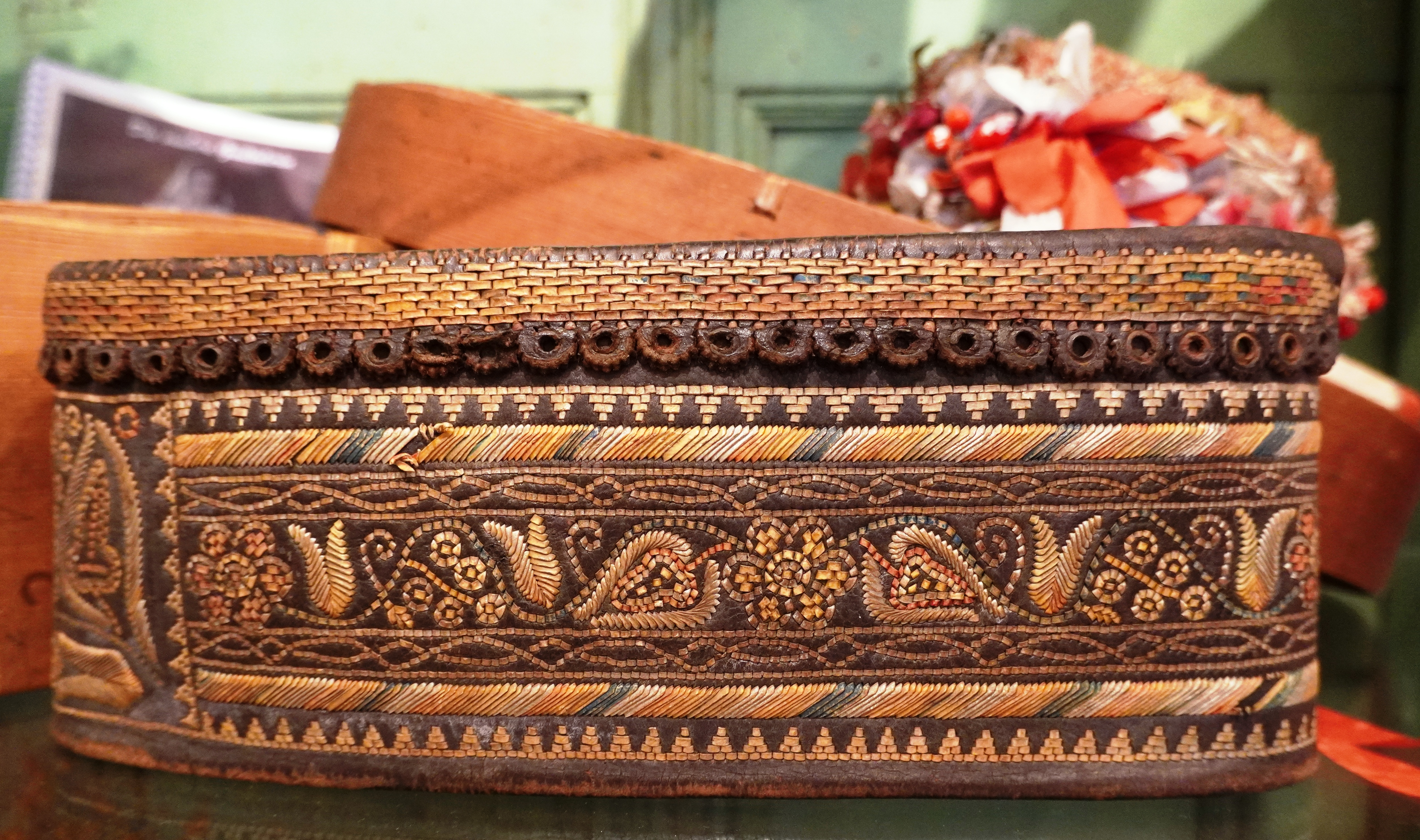
Quill embroidery displayed in the Greißlermuseum in Carinthia

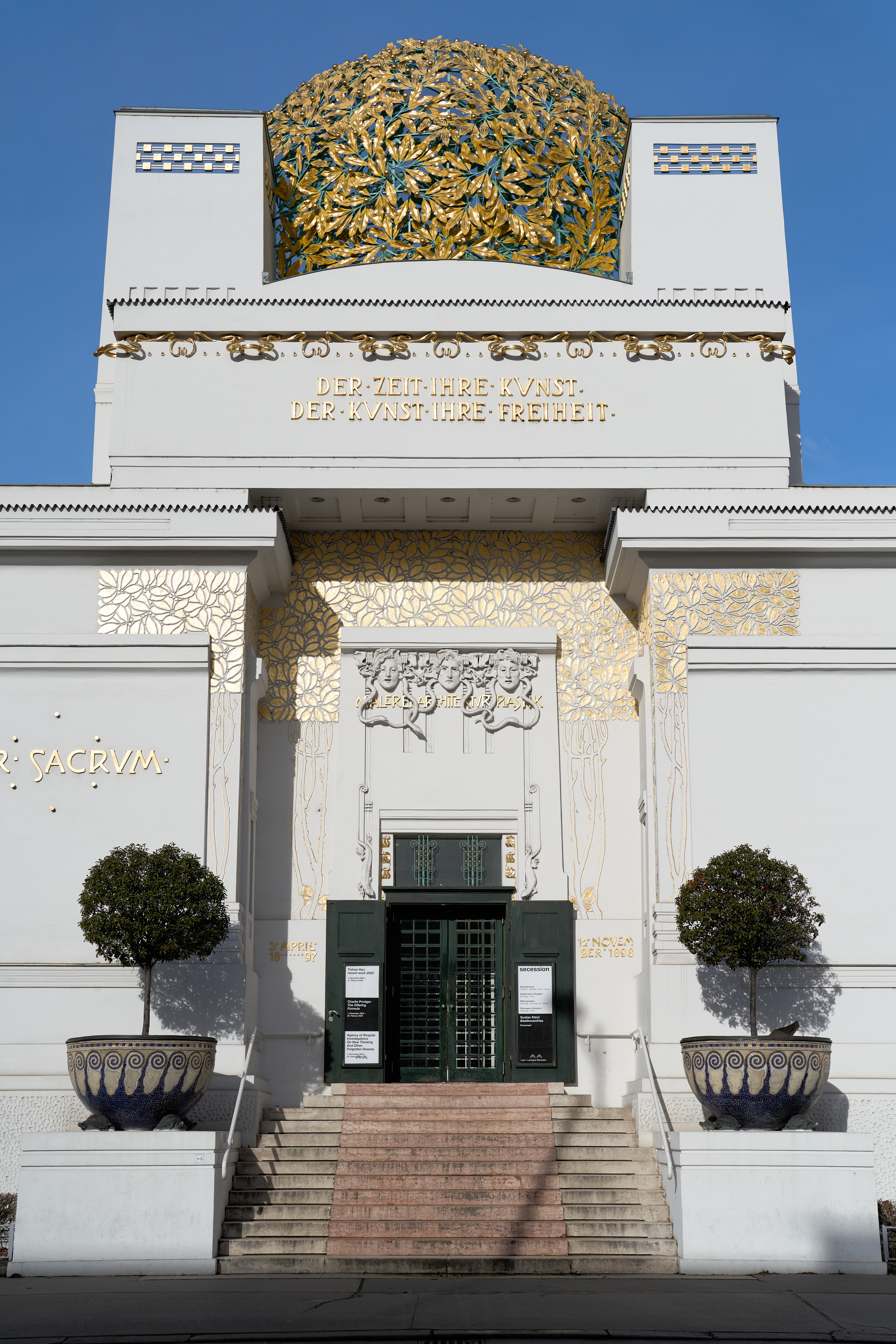
Vienna Secession

=== Vienna Secession ===
The Vienna Secession was part of a varied movement around 1900 that is now covered by the general term Art Nouveau.

Major figures of the Vienna Secession were Otto Wagner, Gustav Klimt, Egon Schiele, and Koloman Moser.

=== Comics ===
Tobias Seicherl drawn by Viennese caricaturist and cartoonist Ladislaus Kmoch, can be regarded as the first continental European daily comic strip. The comic appeared in the Austrian tabloid 'Das Kleine Blatt' (1930–1940) and was very popular.

=== New Media: Ars Electronica ===
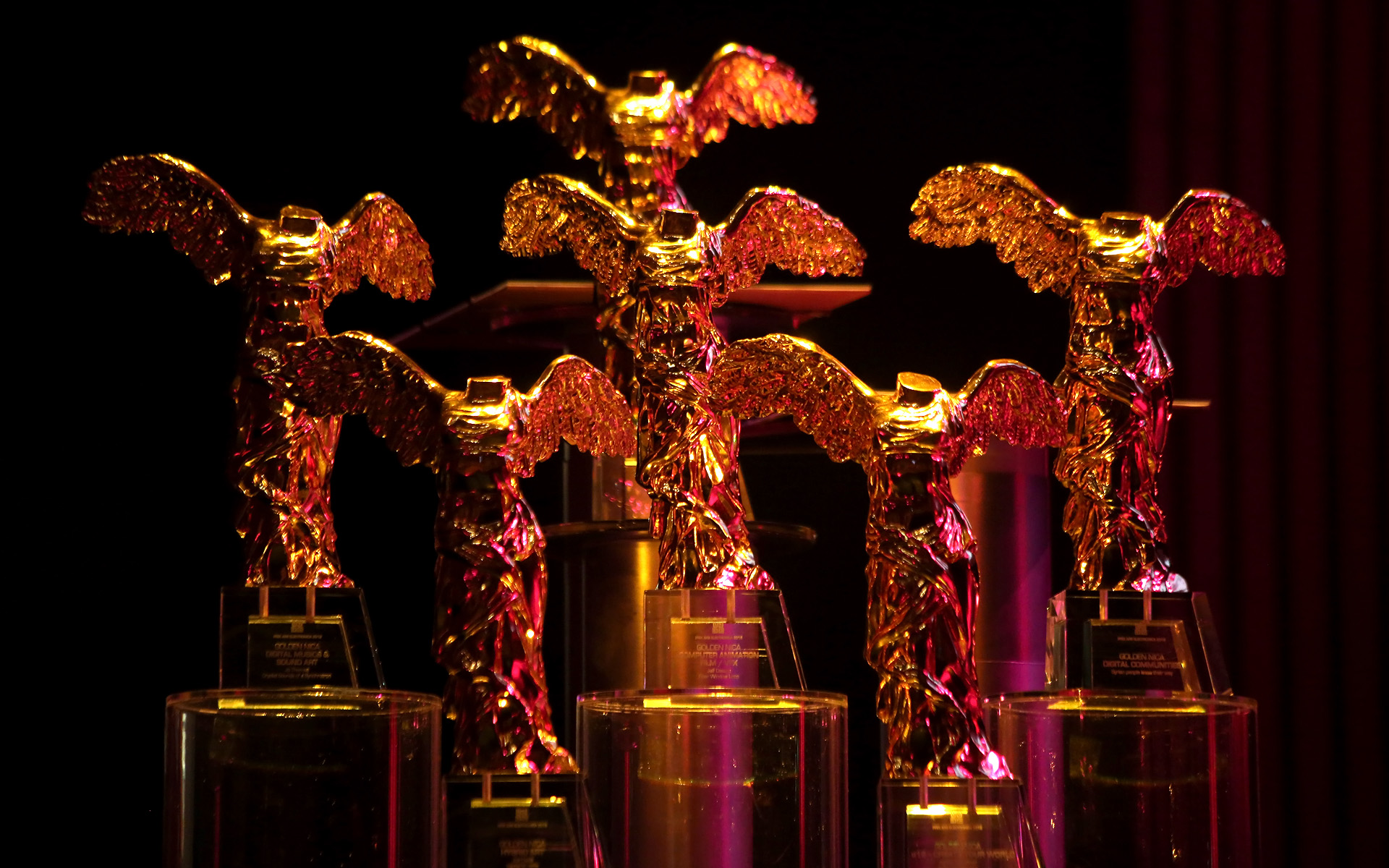
Prix Ars Electronica 2012, Ars Electronica Center

The Prix Ars Electronica is a major award in the field of electronic and interactive art, computer animation, digital culture and music. Since 1987, this award has been given by Ars Electronica, one of the world's major centers for art and technology, which in turn was founded in 1979 in Linz, Austria. The connected museum is the six floor Ars Electronica Center.

=== Broadcasting and Film ===
==== Cinema ====
In the silent movie era, Austria was one of the leading producers of movies. Many of the Austrian directors, actors, authors and cinematographers also worked in Berlin. The most famous was Fritz Lang, the director of Metropolis. Following the Anschluss, the German annexation of Austria in 1938, many Austrian directors emigrated to the United States, including Erich von Stroheim, Otto Preminger, Billy Wilder, Hedy Lamarr, Mia May, Richard Oswald and Josef von Sternberg. From the 1950s to the 1970s, Franz Antel was a prolific director of popular comedies. New, younger directors emerged from the 1970s to the 1990s, among them Axel Corti, Michael Haneke, Ulrich Seidl, Michael Glawogger, Barbara Albert, and Götz Spielmann.

== Philosophy, science and technology ==
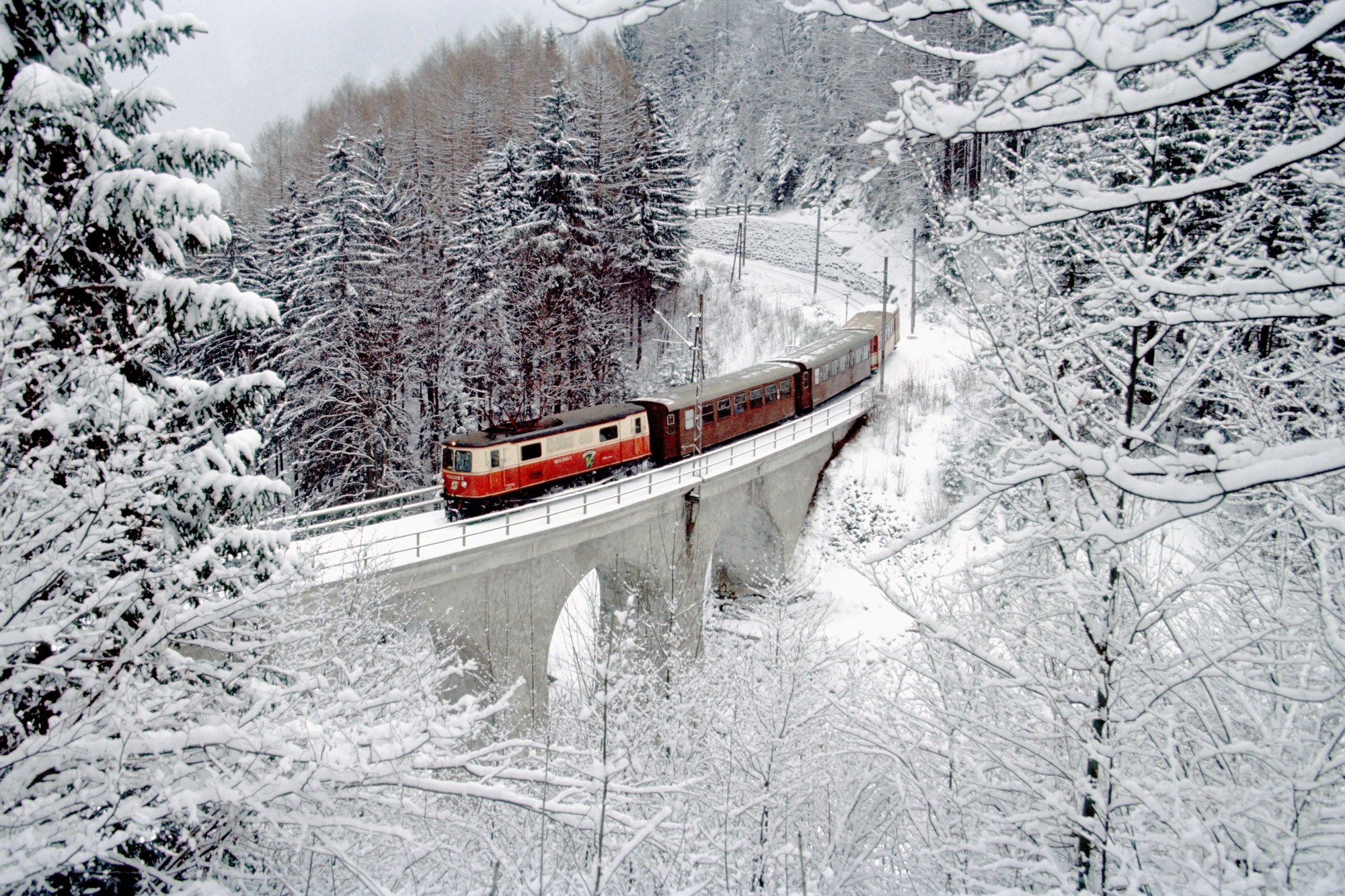
Mariazellerbahn

== Everyday culture ==
=== Transhumance in the Alps ===
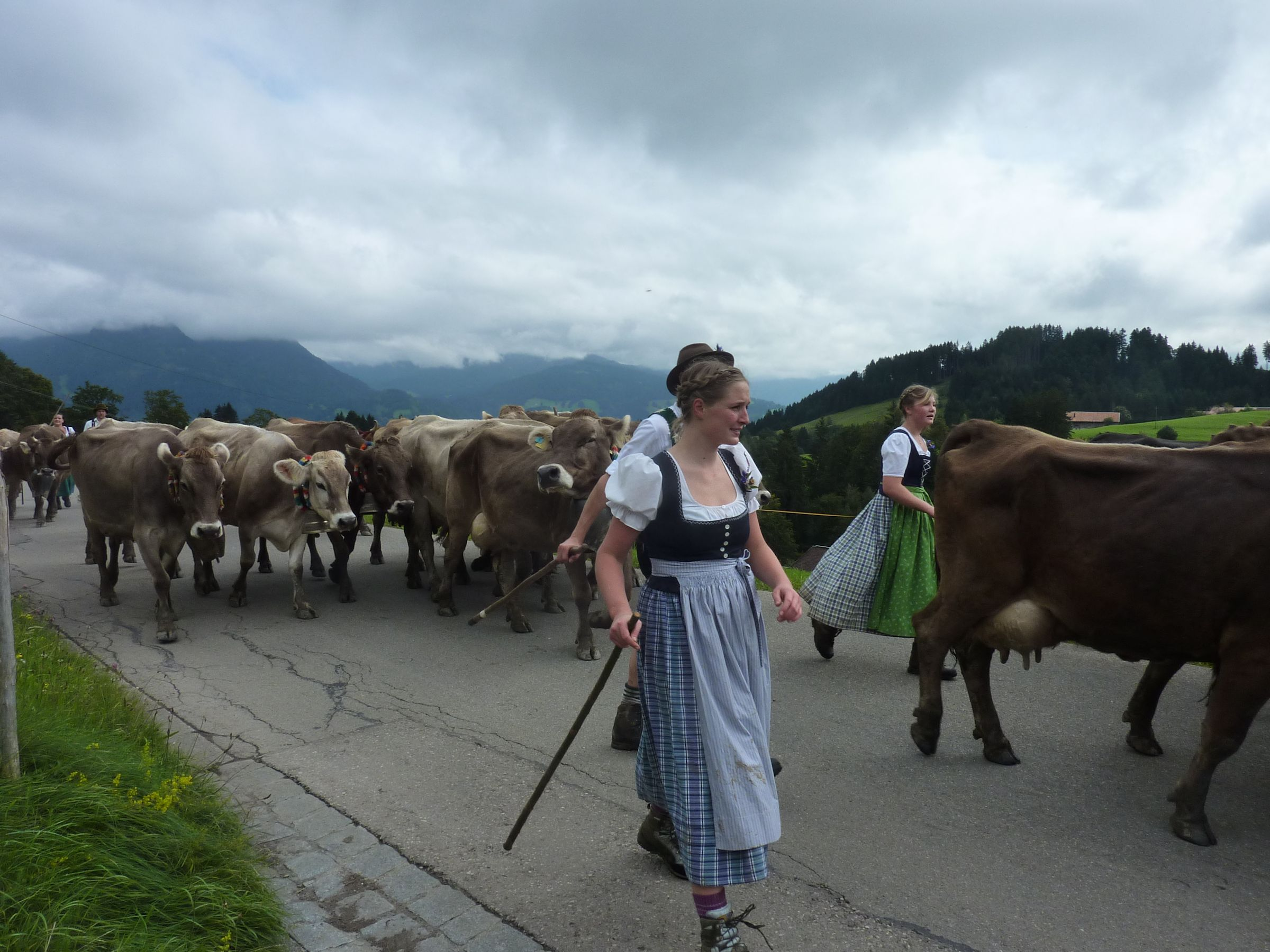
Seasonal migration to pasture

Alpine pastures amount to a quarter of the farmland in Austria, where around 500,000 cattle were taken care of by 70,000 farmers at 12,000 sites.

Rearing cattle involving seasonal migration between valley and high pastures has shaped a lot of landscape in the Alps, as without it, most areas below 2000 m would be forests.

=== Pre-Christian Alpine traditions ===
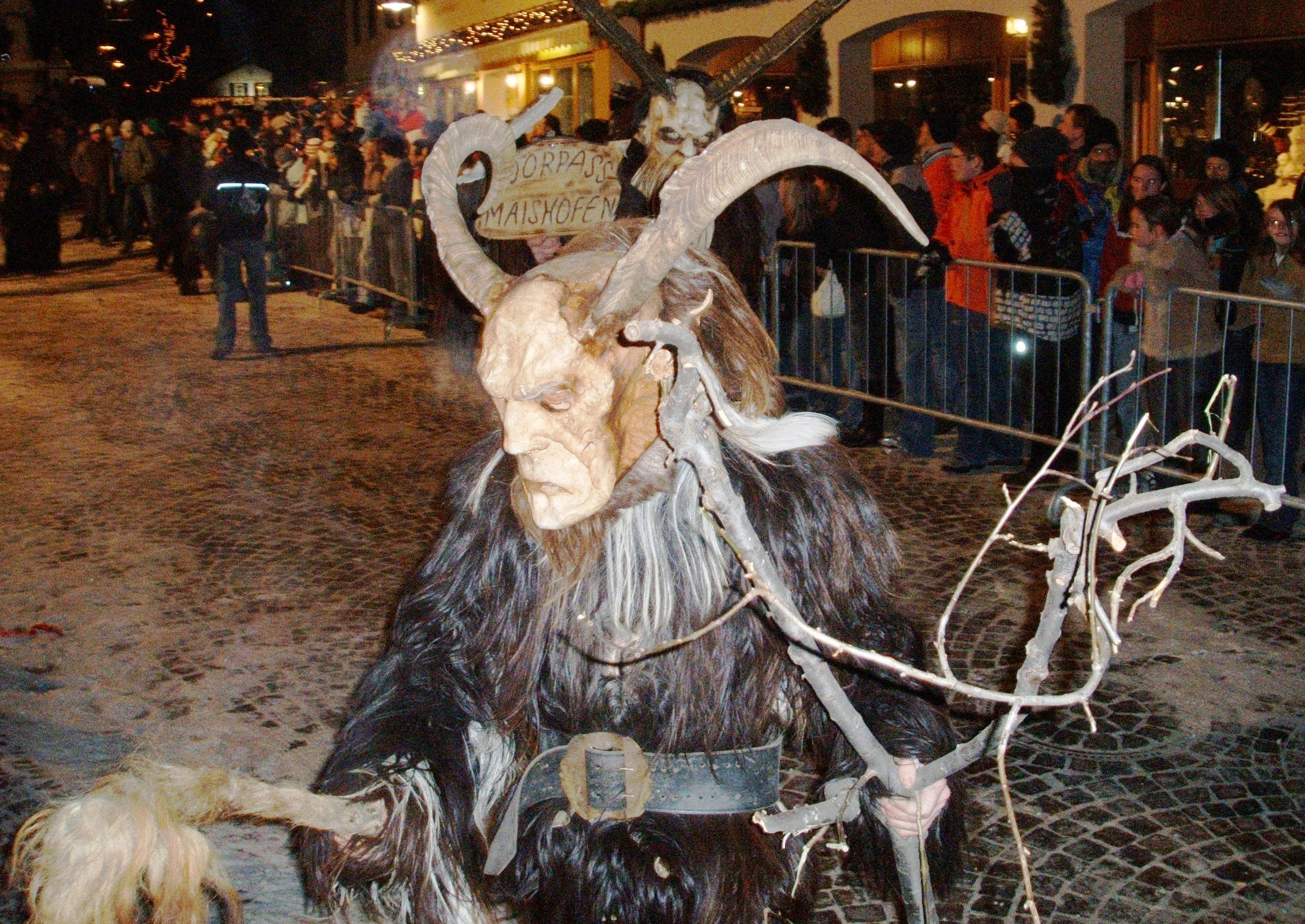
Krampus at Toblach

Some pagan customs survived only in the remote valleys inaccessible to the Roman Catholic Church's influence, other customs were actively assimilated over the centuries. One example is the Perchta, a goddess in Southern Germanic paganism in the Alpine countries, whose name means The Shining One. The Perchta welcome spring time during Fastnacht.

=== Austrian German ===
Schoolchildren in Austria are taught to read and write in Standard German (Standarddeutsch, Hochdeutsch) which is the language of business and government in Austria. The Austrian German spoken at home and in local commerce will be one of a number of regional Upper German dialects (either Austro-Bavarian or Alemannic dialects).

While strong forms of the various dialects are not normally comprehensible to other native German speakers such as Germans or Swiss, there is virtually no communication barrier between the Austro-Bavarian dialects in Austria and those in Bavaria, Germany. The Central Austro-Bavarian dialects are more intelligible to speakers of Standard German than the Southern Austro-Bavarian dialects of Tyrol. Viennese, the Austro-Bavarian dialect of Vienna, is most frequently used in Germany for impersonations of the typical inhabitant of Austria. The people of Graz, the capital of Styria, speak yet another dialect which is not very Styrian and more easily understood by people from other parts of Austria than other Styrian dialects, e.g. from western Styria. As for Western Austria, the dialect of the state of Vorarlberg and of a small part of North Tyrol has linguistically and culturally more in common with German-speaking Switzerland and Baden-Württemberg or Swabia in Southwest Germany as it is an Alemannic dialect like Swiss German or Swabian German.

=== Official minority languages and their influence ===
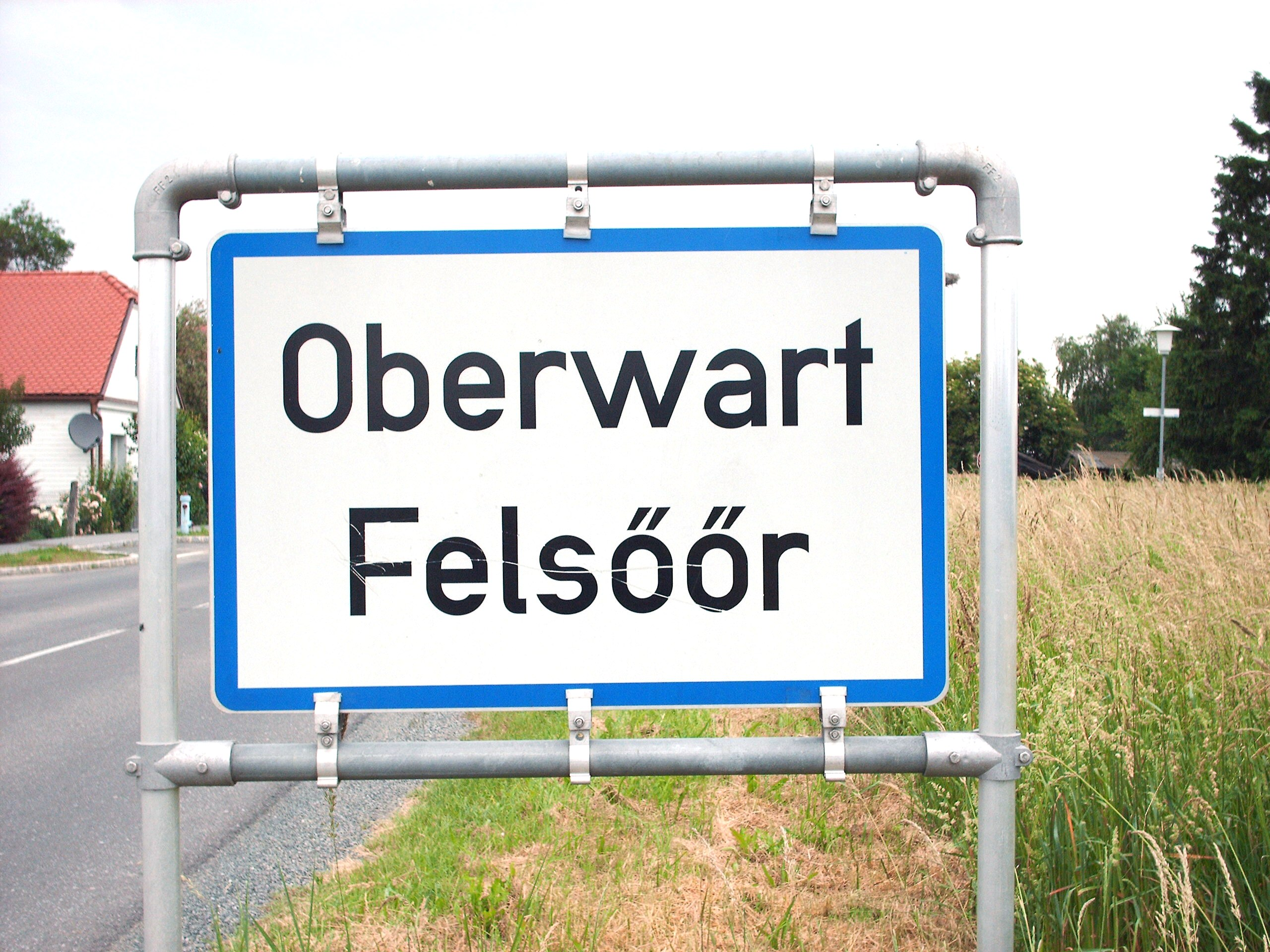
Bilingual German-Hungarian sign in Oberwart, Burgenland

As part of its historic cultural heritage of being a multinational state for centuries (Habsburg monarchy, Austrian Empire, later Austria-Hungary), modern Austria is not entirely homogenously German-speaking, but has within its borders, albeit small, autochthonous minorities of different native tongue: Hungarian is the most widely spoken of the recognized minority languages spoken in Austria (mostly in Burgenland, where it is an official language, and in Vienna; about 40,000 speakers (0.5% of the Austrian population)). Slovene (24,000) has the same status in Carinthia and Styria. The same is true for Burgenland Croatian (19,000), a variant of Croatian spoken in Burgenland. Furthermore, Czech (18,000), Slovak (10,000) and Romani (6,000) are recognized on the basis of minority rights protection.

Austrian German, especially the Viennese dialect, has taken over some words from Hungarian, Czech, Yiddish or some South Slavic languages to replace words otherwise used in Standard German (such as Maschekseitn (the other side), from the Hungarian a másik (the other one), Standard German die andere Seite).

== Food ==
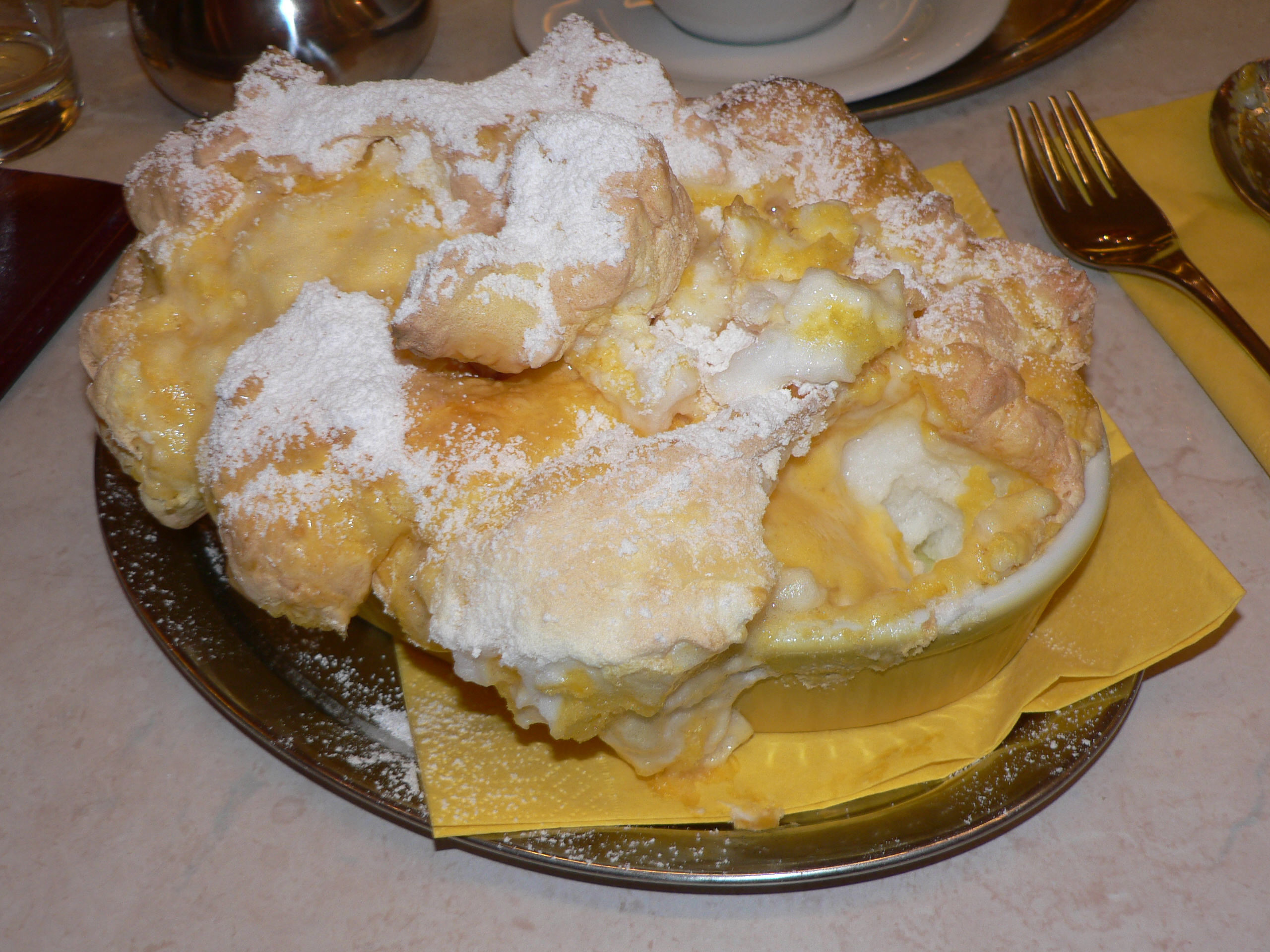
Salzburger Nockerln

Austrian cuisine, which is often incorrectly equated with Viennese cuisine, is derived from the cuisine of the Austro-Hungarian Empire. In addition to native regional traditions it has been influenced above all by Hungarian, Czech, Jewish and Italian cuisines, from which both dishes and methods of food preparation have often been borrowed. Goulash is one example of this. Austrian cuisine is known primarily in the rest of the world for its pastries and sweets. In recent times a new regional cuisine has also developed which is centred on regional produce and employs modern and easy methods of preparation.

Every state in Austria has some specialities: In Lower Austria they have poppies, in Burgenland polenta, in Styria pumpkin, in Carinthia's many lakes they have fish, in Upper Austria, dumpling play a vital role, for Salzburg the Salzburger Nockerln are famous (a Soufflé), Tyrol has their tyrolean bacon, and Vorarlberg is influenced by the close neighbors Switzerland and the Swabia region in Germany, thus cheese plays a role and cheesy Swabian Spätzle are a specialty there.

=== Viennese cuisine ===
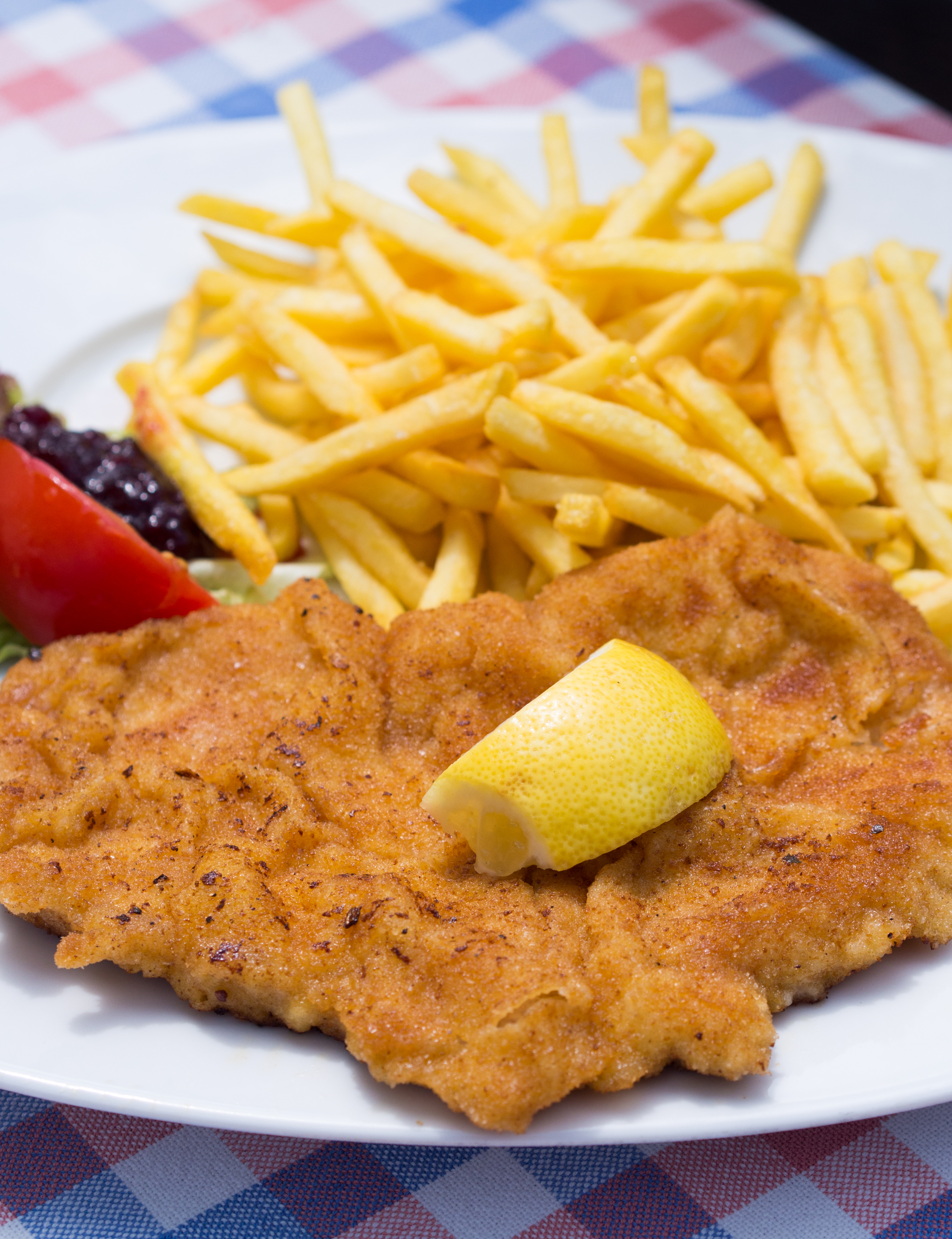
Wiener schnitzel

Vienna has been the capital of Austria for more than a thousand years. It became the cultural centre of the nation and developed its own regional cuisine; as such, Viennese Cuisine bears the unique distinction of being the only kind of cooking named after a city.

The variety of ingredients sold on the Naschmarkt might lead to the thought of a broadly varied cooking culture. In fact, dishes heavily depending on meat make up typical Viennese cuisine: Wiener schnitzel (veal coated in breadcrumbs and fried), Tafelspitz (boiled beef), Beuschel (a ragout containing veal lungs and heart), and Selchfleisch (smoked meat) with sauerkraut and dumplings are typical of its cooking.

Some sweet Viennese dishes include Apfelstrudel (strudel pastry filled with apples), Millirahmstrudel (milk-cream strudel), Kaiserschmarrn (shredded pancakes served with fruit compotes), and Sachertorte (cake of two layers of chocolate cake with apricot jam in the middle). These and many other desserts will be on offer at one of the many Konditorei of Vienna, where they are generally eaten with coffee in the afternoon.

Liptauer as a spread, or Powidl also as spread or base for dumplings are also quite popular.

=== Viennese café ===
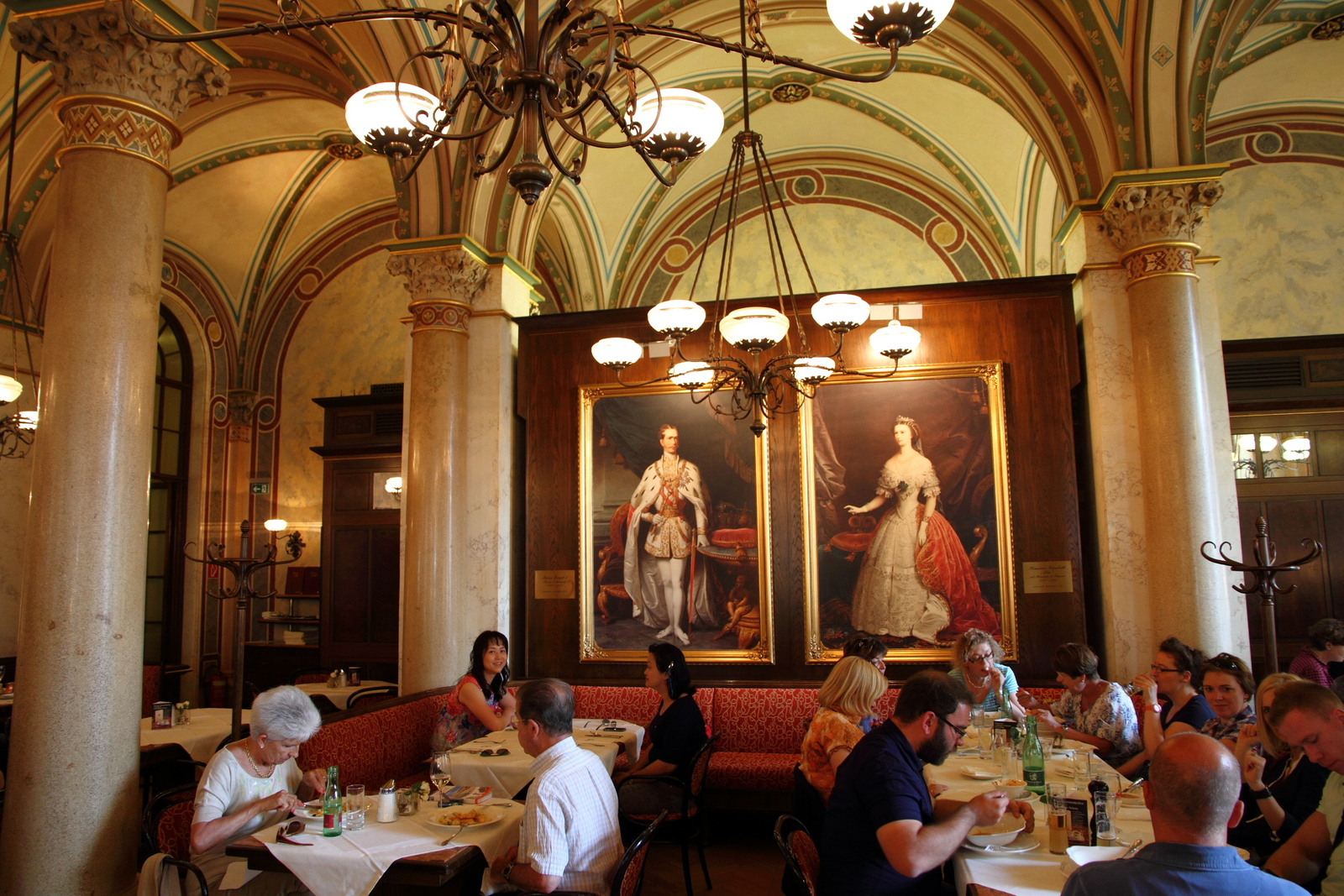
Café Central in Vienna

The culture of coffee houses in the West began in Austria and remains a fixture of its culture. Much of the reputation these achieved during the turn of the 19th century resulted when writers like Peter Altenberg, Karl Kraus, Hermann Broch and Friedrich Torberg decided to use them as places of work and socializing. Celebrated Austrian writer Peter Altenberg is rumoured to have given "Wien 1, Café Central" as his private address, as he spent so much time in Café Central. Artists, thinkers, and political radicals of the period such as Arthur Schnitzler, Stefan Zweig, Egon Schiele, Gustav Klimt, Adolf Loos, Theodor Herzl, and even Leon Trotsky were regular coffee house patrons.

=== Austrian wine ===
Austria has a long winemaking tradition and produces both white and red varieties. Evidence of wine in urns in the area of Zagersdorf in Burgenland dates viticulture back to 700 B.C.

Austria has over 50,000 hectares of vineyard, almost all of it in the east or southeast of the country. Many of the approximately 20,000 small wine-producing estates base their finances on their direct retail of wine. Due to a decree that goes back to the so-called Maria Theresianische Buschenschankverordnung from 1784, a vintner can sell his own wine in his own house without any dedicated license to do so.

The Grüner Veltliner is the dominant grape varietal cultivated in Austria, and the dry white wines produced from this grape have gained international recognition.

=== Austrian beer ===
There are many different types of Austrian beer to be found. One of the most common brands of beer to be found in Austria is Stiegl, founded in 1492.

== Sports ==
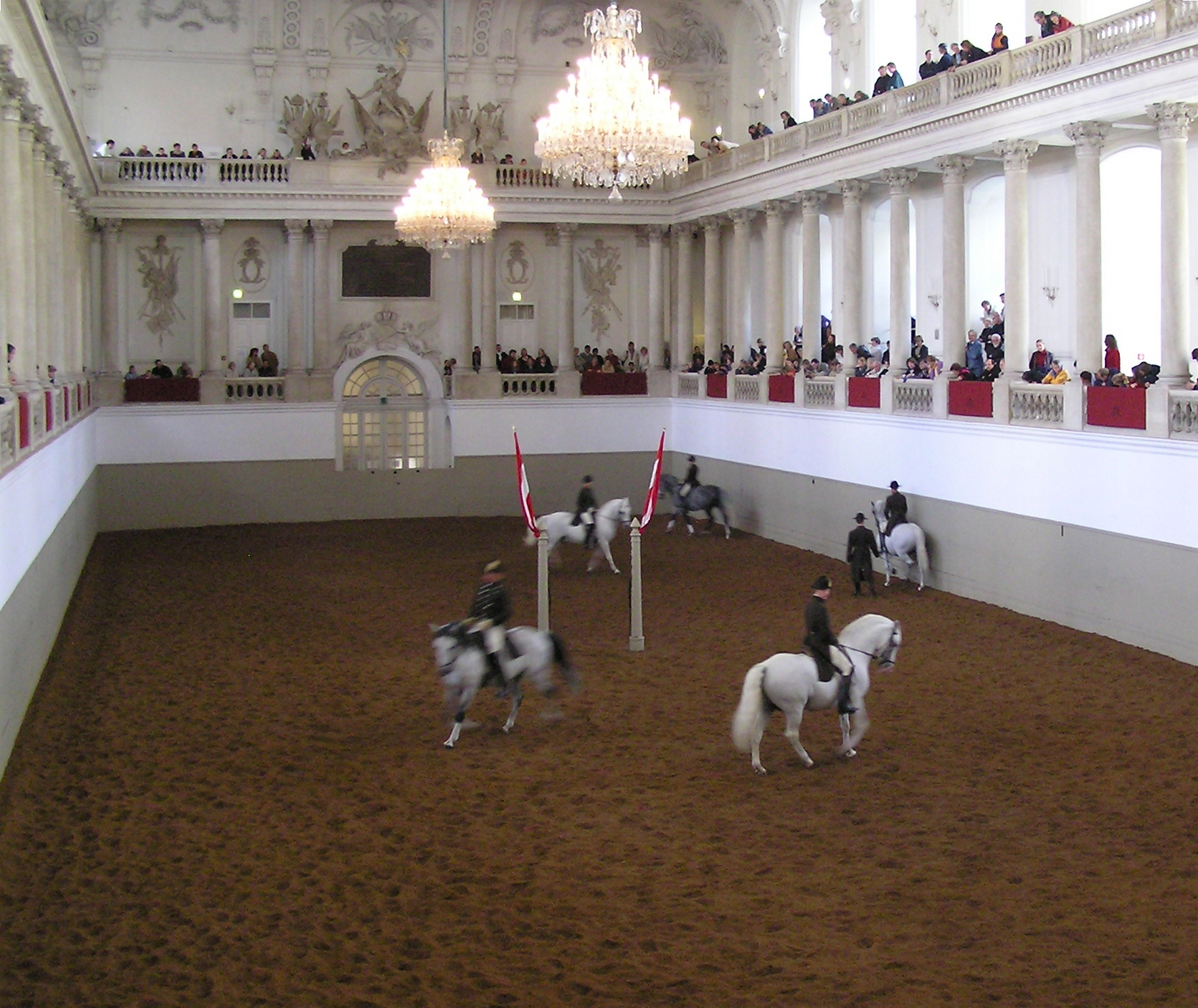
Austria is known for its Lipizzaner horses at Vienna's Spanish Riding School.

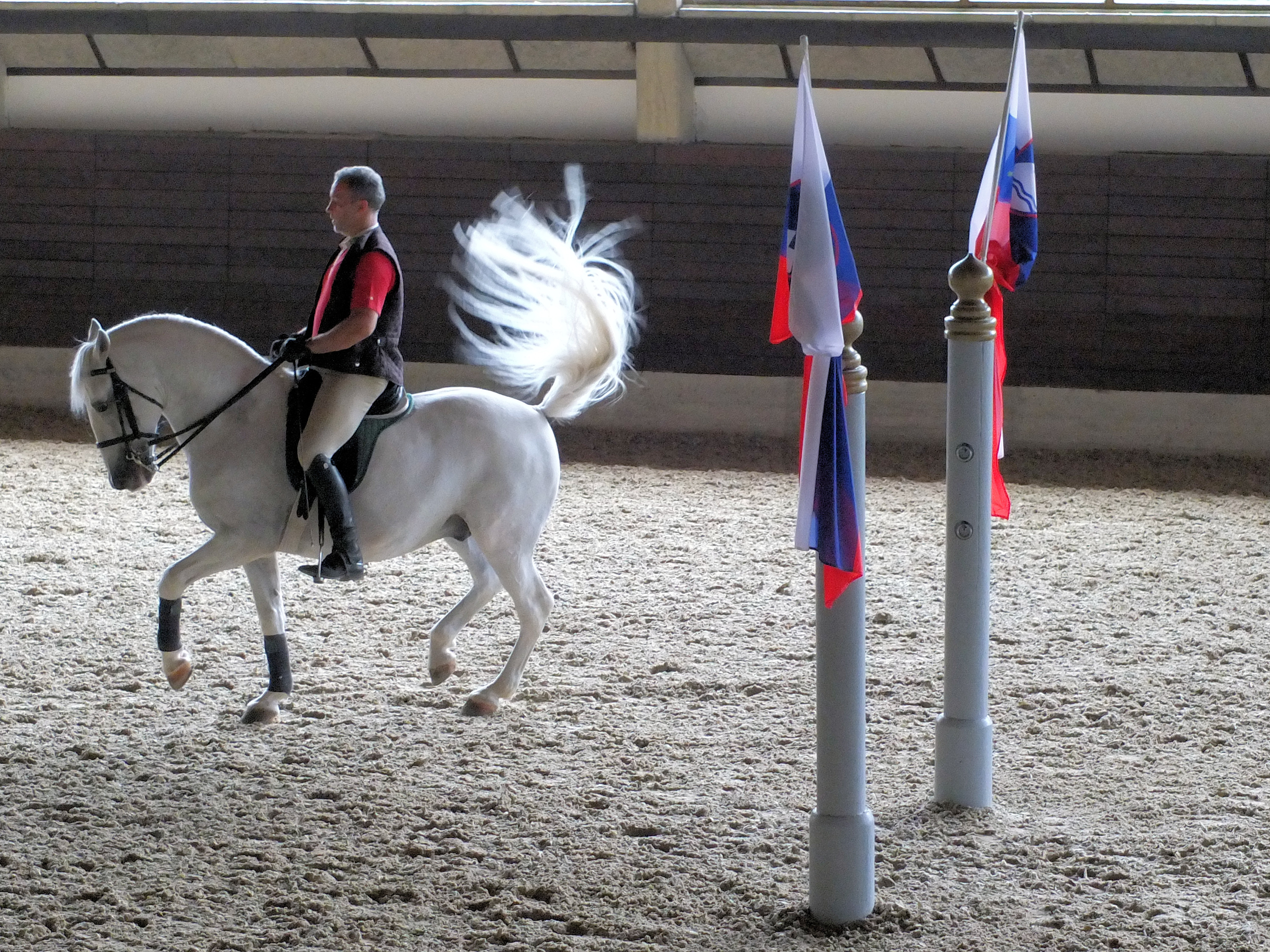
Lipizzaner

Common sports in Austria are football (soccer), skiing, and ice hockey. Since Austria straddles the Alps, it is a prime location for skiing. Austria is the leading nation in the Alpine Skiing World Cup (consistently winning the largest number of points of all countries) and also strong in many other winter sports such as ski jumping. Austria's national ice hockey team ranks 13th in the world.

Austria (particularly Vienna) also has an old tradition in football, even though, since World War II, the sport has more or less been in decline in the country. The Austrian Championship (originally only limited to Vienna, as there were no professional teams elsewhere), has been held since 1912. The Austrian Cup has been held since 1913. The Austria national football team has qualified for the FIFA World Cup seven times, but did not qualify for a European Championship, until the 2008 tournament when it qualified as co-hosts with Switzerland. The governing body for football in Austria is the Austrian Football Association.

The first official world chess champion, Wilhelm Steinitz was from the Austrian Empire.

Also, Vienna is well known for the Spanish Riding school, where skilled riders ride Lipizzaner horses in difficult poses and dances.

== Education ==
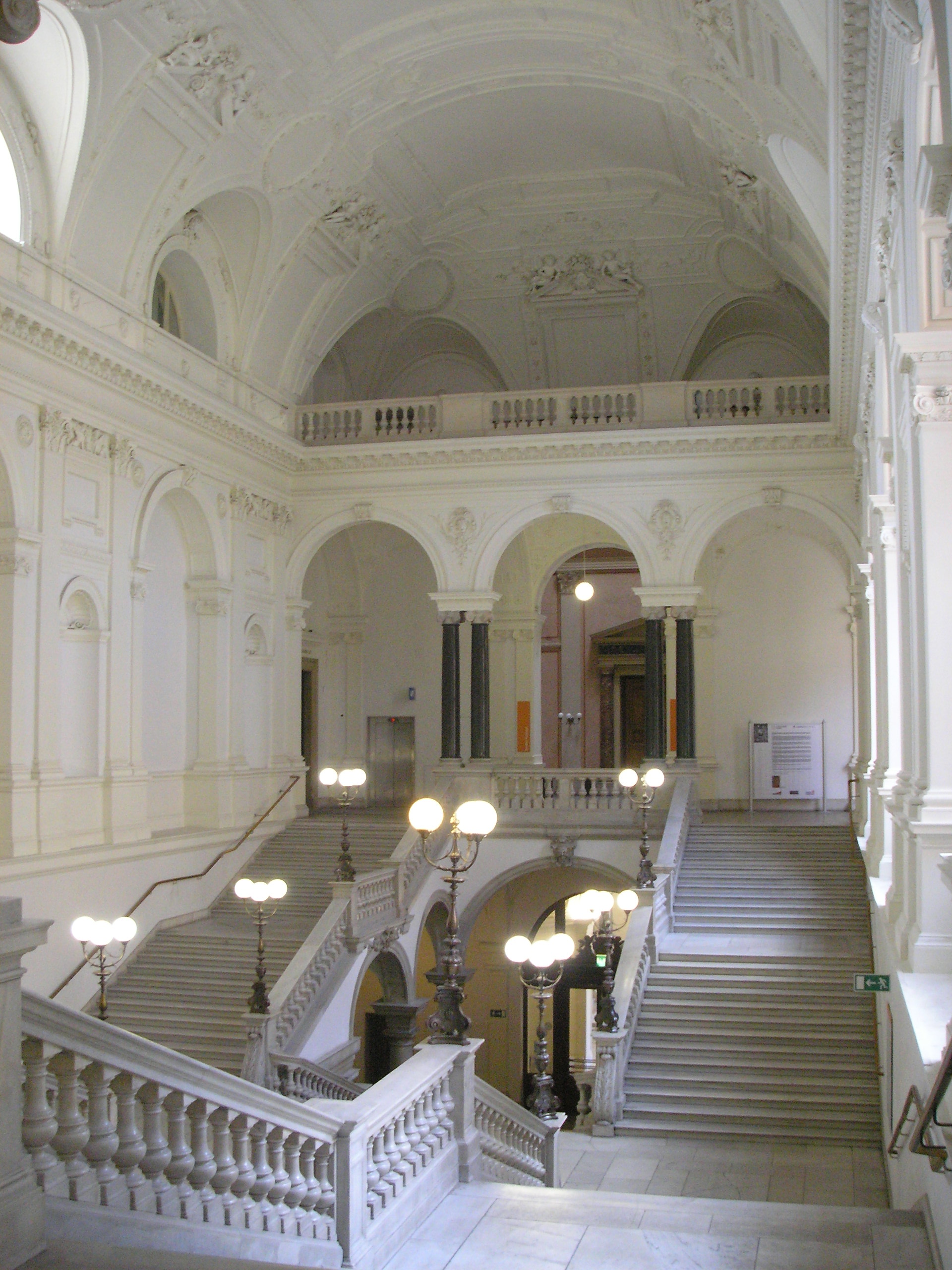
View of one of the main stairs (Hauptstiege) in the University of Vienna

Empress Maria Theresa instituted the "General School Regulations, in 1774", creating the Austrian educational system. Eight-year compulsory education was introduced in 1869. Currently, compulsory schooling lasts nine years.

Four years of elementary school (Volksschule for ages 6–10) are followed by secondary education in a Hauptschule, or the first four years of Gymnasium as intermediate school. In particular in the rural areas, there is quite often no gymnasium available, so everyone attends the hauptschule.

After the age of 14, students make their first major choice about their educational path, regardless of what school they have attended until then. They can choose to spend a year at polytechnic school, which qualifies them for vocational school as part of an apprenticeship, or they can go to the Höhere Technische Lehranstalt (HTL), which are technically orientated higher colleges and a unique feature of the Austrian educational system. Completing the HTL gives the graduate the right to use the title "Ing." (Engineer) alongside their name. Another option is the Handelsakademie which focuses on accounting and business administration. Finally, students may opt to attend Gymnasium, which ends with the Matura exam, and leads to further education at a university. There are a couple of other school types not mentioned here.

An alternative to university is the Austrian Fachhochschule, which is more practically oriented than a university but also leads to an academic degree. As part of the Bologna process, both the education at universities as well as at the Fachhochschulen changes.

Federal laws enforce uniformity across provinces throughout the educational system.

All state-run schools are free of charge. The largest university is the University of Vienna.

== Religion ==
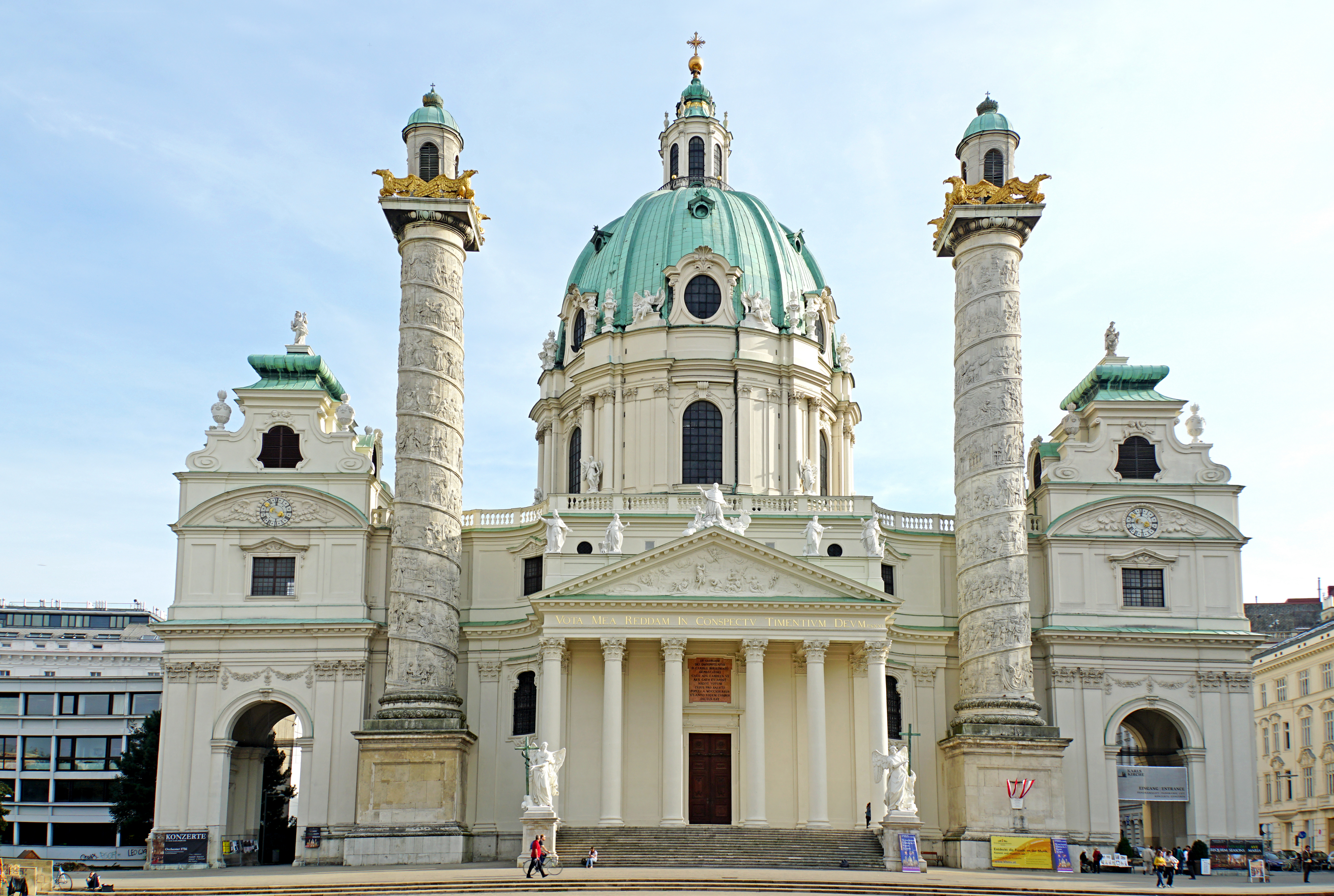
The Rektoratskirche St. Karl Borromäus in Vienna

As in 2001 about 73.6% of the native population identify themselves as Roman Catholic, while 4.7% consider themselves Protestant. Some 400,000 Austrians are members of diverse Muslim communities, about 180,000 are members of the Eastern Orthodox Church, about 10,000 are Buddhist and about 7,300 are Jewish. Prior to the Holocaust, about 200,000 Jews lived in Austria.

About 12% of the population does not belong to any church or religious community.

== Public holidays ==
Since Roman Catholicism is the predominant Christian denomination in Austria, most of the public holidays are Catholic ones. At the same time, and in contrast to Switzerland or Germany, Good Friday is a public holiday not just for Catholics, but for all citizens belonging to any denomination that observes Good Friday.

Although most holidays in Austria are defined in the federal labour law (Arbeitsruhegesetz), some are due to other sources of law such as social partnership collective contracts (see: Austria's "social partnership"). Due to the special emphasis that the Austrian labour law puts on the collective contract, in Austria such contracts are not limited to members of the union that negotiated the contract. This means that the collective contract is actually more like a law than a union agreement.

In addition to national holidays, some holidays are defined on a state-by-state basis. Abbreviations for the Austria states are described in States of Austria.

Easter Sunday and Whitsun are not listed below, since these will always by definition fall on a Sunday and are therefore already regulated by Sunday laws.

| English name | Local name | Date | B | K | NÖ | OÖ | S | ST | T | V | W |
|---|---|---|---|---|---|---|---|---|---|---|---|
| New Year's Day | Neujahr | 1 January | • | • | • | • | • | • | • | • | • |
| Epiphany | Heilige Drei Könige | 6 January | • | • | • | • | • | • | • | • | • |
| Saint Joseph | Josef 5) | 19 March | | • | | | | • | • | • | |
| Good Friday | Karfreitag 1) | floating holiday (Easter Sunday - 2 days) | • | • | • | • | • | • | • | • | • |
| Easter Monday | Ostermontag | floating holiday (Easter Sunday + 1 day) | • | • | • | • | • | • | • | • | • |
| National Holiday Labour Day | Staatsfeiertag (Tag der Arbeit) | 1 May | • | • | • | • | • | • | • | • | • |
| Saint Florian | Florian 4) 5) | 4 May | | | | • | | | | | |
| Ascension | Christi Himmelfahrt | floating holiday (Easter Sunday + 39 days) | • | • | • | • | • | • | • | • | • |
| Whit Monday | Pfingstmontag | floating holiday (Easter Sunday + 50 days) | • | • | • | • | • | • | • | • | • |
| Corpus Christi | Fronleichnam | floating holiday (Easter Sunday + 60 days) | • | • | • | • | • | • | • | • | • |
| Assumption of Mary | Mariä Himmelfahrt | 15 August | • | • | • | • | • | • | • | • | • |
| Rupert of Salzburg | Rupert 5) | 24 September | | | | | • | | | | |
| Carinthian Plebiscite | Tag der Volksabstimmung 5) | 10 October | | • | | | | | | | |
| National Day (Declaration of Neutrality) | Nationalfeiertag | 26 October | • | • | • | • | • | • | • | • | • |
| All Saints | Allerheiligen | 1 November | • | • | • | • | • | • | • | • | • |
| Martin of Tours | Martin 5) | 11 November | • | | | | | | | | |
| Leopold III, Margrave of Austria | Leopold 3) 5) | 15 November | | | • | | | | | | • |
| Immaculate Conception | Mariä Empfängnis 2) | 8 December | • | • | • | • | • | • | • | • | • |
| Christmas Eve | Heiliger Abend (CC) | 24 December | • | • | • | • | • | • | • | • | • |
| Christmas | Christtag | 25 December | • | • | • | • | • | • | • | • | • |
| Saint Stephen's Day | Stefanitag | 26 December | • | • | • | • | • | • | • | • | • |
| New Year's Eve | Silvester (CC) | 31 December | • | • | • | • | • | • | • | • | • |
| Total number of days 6) | | | 17 | 18 | 17 | 17 | 17 | 17 | 17 | 17 | 17 |

(CC) day off or partly day off due to collective contract (German: Kollektivvertrag)

1) Holiday according to the federal labor law, but applies only to the followers of the Reformed churches and Lutheran Church, the Old Catholic Church and the Methodist Church.

2) If 8 December is a working day, employees may work in shops.

3) Until 2003 it was also a holiday in Upper Austria.

4) A holiday only since 2004.

5) Holidays by state law, primarily affecting schools and state offices.

6) The total number of holidays that apply for all employees is 13, or 12, if 2) applies.

== Sources ==
- Zulehner, Paul M. (2004). "Religion in Austria" (PDF). In Bischof, Günter; Pelinka, Anton; Denz, Hermann (eds.). Religion in Austria. Contemporary Austrian Studies. Vol. 13. Taylor & Francis. pp. 37–62 (1–21). ISBN 9780765808233.
