= Madcap =

Madcap may refer to:

== People ==
- Madcap Moss, professional wrestler for WWE

== Arts, media and entertainment ==
=== In comics ===
- Madcap (comics), a fictional character in the Marvel Universe

=== In film and video ===
- Madcap (project), an annotated video project of Xerox PARC

=== In music ===
- The Madcaps, an Austrian band of the 1960s and 1970s
- The Madcap Laughs, an album by former Pink Floyd member Syd Barrett
- 'Madcap", a song by Polish gothic metal band Sirrah, from their album Did Tomorrow Come...

=== In theater ===
- Madcap Theater, a shortform improvisational comedy group

== Business ==
- Madcap (restaurant), a contemporary Asian restaurant in San Anselmo, California

== Technology ==
- Multicast Address Dynamic Client Allocation Protocol, MADCAP as defined by IETF RFC 2730

== Vehicles ==
- Tamiya Madcap, 1/10 scale off-road buggy
