= Tamiya Madcap =

1989 toy buggy made by Tamiya

The Tamiya Madcap 1/10 scale off-road buggy was released in 1989 by Tamiya and is based on the running gear of the Astute. The Madcap was an entry level buggy but also proved to be very competitive when given some additional 'hop-ups'. It was two-wheel drive, had a monocoque chassis tub, and double wishbone suspension. It ran the Astute ball differential (this can prove to be a weakness), and shared many other components with its bigger, more competitive brother. The Lexan body was intended to be painted white with a red wing, and driven by 'Sammy Screwloose'. Many Madcap's survive today, and parts are available on eBay.

== Gallery ==
This was one of Tamiya's better looking buggies and released towards the end of the Radio Control golden era.

Tamiya Madcap Restored

Tamiya Madcap Modified
