= Wolfgang Ambros =

Austrian singer-songwriter

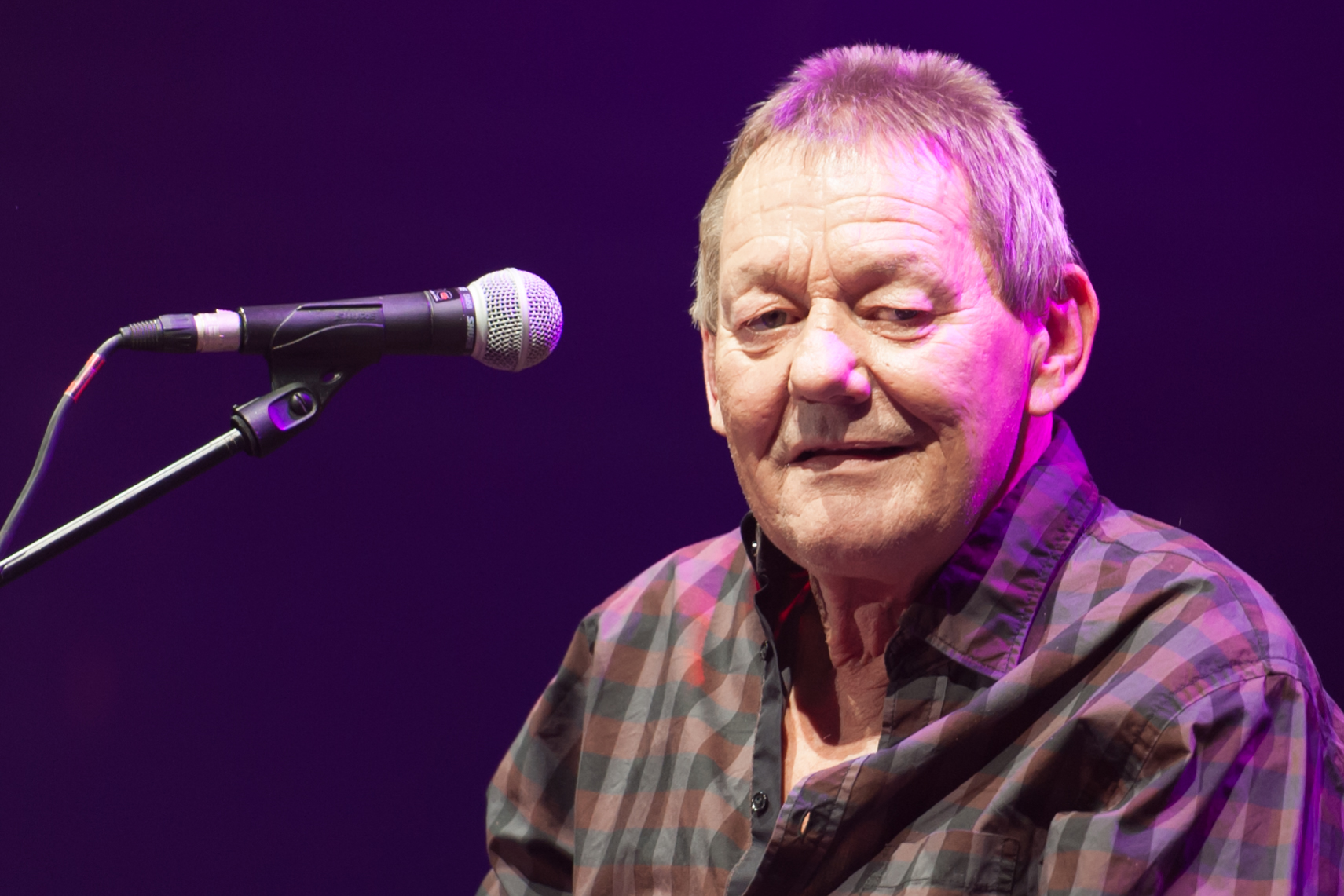
- Ambros in 2014

Background information
- Born: 19 March 1952 (age 74); Vienna, Allied-occupied Austria
- Genres: Pop, rock
- Occupation: Singer-songwriter
- Instruments: Vocals, guitar
- Years active: 1971–present
- Website: wolfgangambros.at

Wolfgang Ambros (born 19 March 1952) is an Austrian liedermacher (singer-songwriter). He is one of the most important contemporary Austrian musicians and is considered to be one of the founders of Austropop.

== Early life ==
Ambros was born in the Semmelweis Women's Clinic in Vienna and spent his early years in Wolfsgraben, Lower Austria. His father was head of the primary school there, his mother worked as a teacher. Later, the family moved to Preßbaum. Ambros attended the Bundeskonvikt in Vienna's 2nd district and the Astgasse Grammar School in Vienna's 14th district. He later trained as a screen printer at the Graphische Lehr- und Versuchsanstalt (training discontinued). He first worked as a typewriter mechanic, display arranger and as a records salesman in Vienna and for a year in London.

== Career ==
Ambros' most famous songs are "Schifoan", "Es lebe der Zentralfriedhof" and "Zwickt's mi". "Schifoan" is effectively an anthem for the Austrian ski tourism and industry. Many Austrian skiers—but also many others—know the lyrics of this song.

Ambros has also released three cover albums (including songs by Bob Dylan, Tom Waits and Hans Moser. His latest album Steh grod (2006) was very successful.

=== Collaborations ===
Since 1978, Ambros has cooperated with the duo Tauchen/Prokopetz, who were very successful with DÖF in the 1980s. Also since 1978 Ambros has sung at live concerts with his band No. 1 vom Wienerwald.

In the 1980s, Ambros sang together with André Heller. One of his biggest concerts took place at the Wiener Weststadion. Another one on the Kitzsteinhorn was the highest place a rock concert ever took place.

There were also cooperative efforts with the Viennese blues-musicians Harry Stampfer, Hans Thessink, Günter Dzikowski and DJ Kidpariz.

In 1997, he founded with Rainhard Fendrich and Georg Danzer the public charity "Initiative für Obdachlose" and the project Austria 3. On 10 December 1997 they were playing a unique concert, singing as group their own (solo) songs. The concert was done to collect money for homeless people and their public charity. Because of the success of this concert they continued this project and made many concerts in Austria and Germany and released three live-CDs from 1998 to 2000 (and some greatest hits-CDs).

In 2002, he won the AMADEUS Austrian Music Award.

In 2005, he released the Album Der alte Sünder – Ambros singt Moser, which was a cover album of songs, recorded with Christian Kolonovits.

== Discography ==
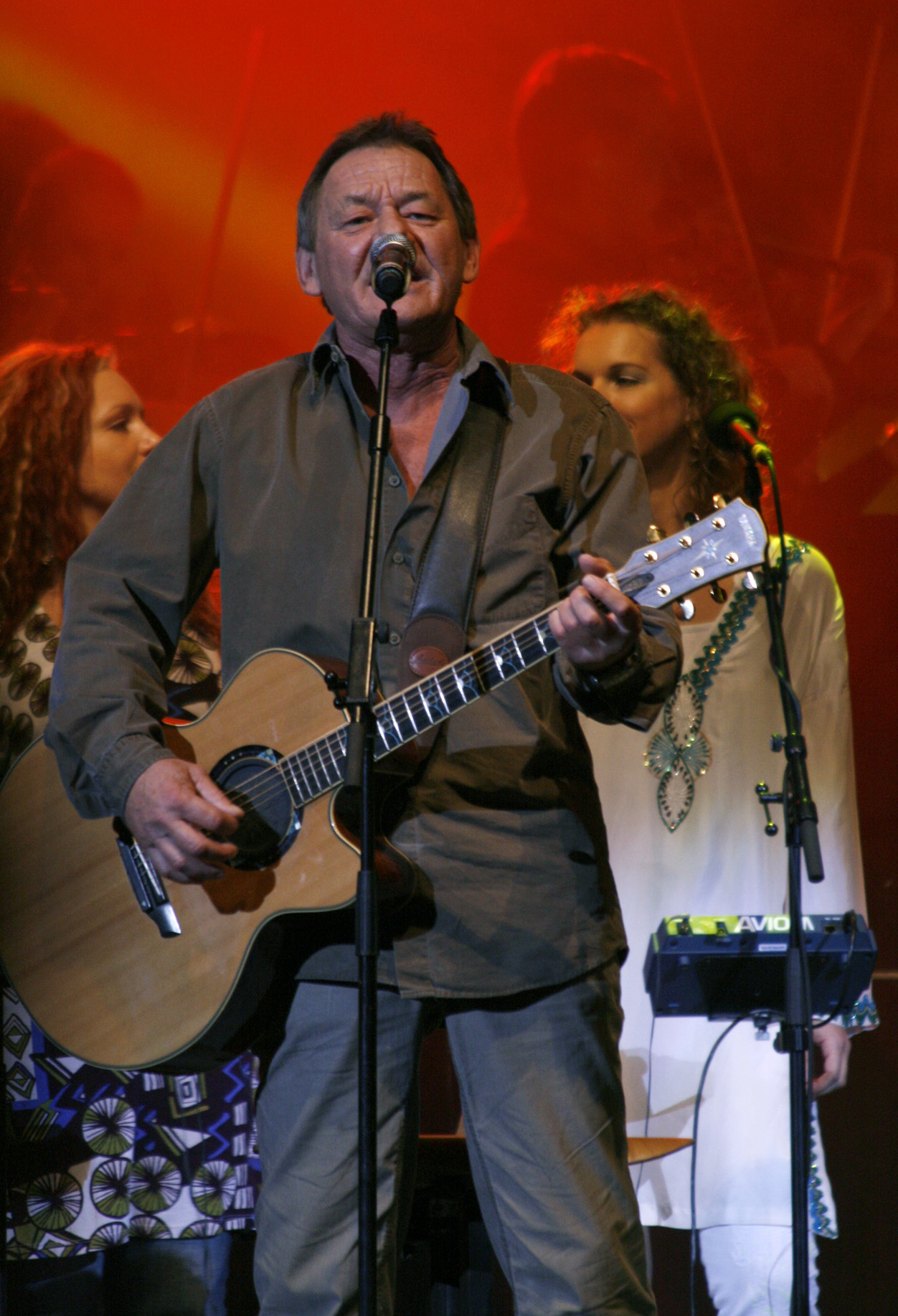
Ambros performing in Vienna in 2008

=== Albums ===
- 1972: Alles andere zählt net mehr
- 1973: Eigenheiten
- 1976: Es lebe der Zentralfriedhof
- 1976: 19 Class A Numbers
- 1977: Hoffnungslos
- 1978: Wie im Schlaf (Songs by Bob Dylan – sung by W. Ambros)
- 1979: Nie und nimmer
- 1980: Weiß wie Schnee
- 1981: Selbstbewusst
- 1983: Der letzte Tanz
- 1984: Der Sinn des Lebens
- 1985: No. 13
- 1987: Gewitter
- 1989: Mann und Frau
- 1990: Stille Glut
- 1992: Äquator
- 1994: Wasserfall
- 1996: Verwahrlost aber frei
- 1999: Voom Voom Vanilla Camera
- 2000: Nach mir die Sintflut – Ambros singt Waits
- 2003: Namenlos
- 2005: Der alte Sünder – Ambros singt Moser (songs by Hans Moser – sung by W. Ambros with the Ambassade Orchester Wien)
- 2006: Steh Grod
- 2007: Ambros singt Moser – Die 2te (songs by Hans Moser – sung by W. Ambros with the Ambassade Orchester Wien)
- 2009: Wolfgang Ambros Ultimativ Symphonisch (sung by W. Ambros with the Ambassade Orchester Wien)
- 2012: 19 03 52

=== Live albums ===
- 1979: Live ...auf ana langen finstern Strassn (2 LPs)
- 1983: Open Air (with Rainhard Fendrich)
- 1986: Selected Live (2 CDs)
- 1987: Gala Concert
- 1991: Watzmann Live (2 CDs with 25 Tracks; Re-Release, 2005, 2 CDs with 40 Tracks)
- 1997: Verwahrlost aber Live
- 2002: Hoffnungslos Selbstbewusst
- 2007: Ambros Pur! (Duo Konzert mit G. Dzikowski – Live aus der Kulisse/Wien (DVD)

=== Plays ===
- 1973: Fäustling
- 1974: Der Watzmann ruft
- 1978: Schaffnerlos (Die letzte Fahrt des Schaffners Fritz Knottek)
- 1981: Augustin (Eine Geschichte aus Wien)

=== Singles ===
- 1971: Da Hofa / I bin allan
- 1972: Kagran / Wo ist da Peppe
- 1973: Tagwache / Herr Vampir
- 1973: I drah zua / Dei Foto
- 1974: A Mensch mecht i bleib´n / I steh auf a Alte
- 1975: Zwickt's mi / Aufzogn mit´n Rum
- 1975: Gö da schaust / Wüst oda wüst ned
- 1976: Baba und foi ned / UFO
- 1976: Hoit da is a Spoit / Warum host des g´mocht
- 1976: Schifoan / Mochtwurt
- 1977: Die Blume aus dem Gemeindebau / Denk amoi
- 1979: Nie und nimmer / De No.1 vom Wienerwald
- 1981: Frage der Zeit / Lokalverbot
- 1983: Sei ned bled / Immer vü Zeit
- 1983: Für immer jung (with André Heller) / Hand in Hand
- 1984: S Naserl / Heit bin i wieder fett wie ein Radierer (with Rainhard Fendrich)
- 1985: Kumm ma mit kane Ausreden mehr (with André Heller) / I werd des nie verstehn
- 1985: Geplante Zukunft (Live) / Wie a Adler
- 1985: Warum? (Project Austria für Afrika) / Warum
- 1986: Langsam wachs ma zamm / Schwesternlied
- 1986: Mamma / Alarm
- 1987: Du und i (with Friedrich Gulda)
- 1987: Gewitter / Mein seltsamer Beruf
- 1987: V.I.P. / Wir, die denken
- 1987: I bins ned / Des Sandlers Flucht
- 1988: Rukuruku Bay / The Ruku Pump Up 8 kHz Mix
- 1989: Idealgewicht / A junger Mensch von heute
- 1989: Erste große Liebe / Noch immer
- 1989: Zwickts mi 2000 / Soul Sister
- 1990: Langsam wochs ma zamm / Die Blume aus dem Gemeindebau
- 1991: Abwärts und bergauf / Lied der Knechte
- 1992: Die Gailtalerin / Er fallt
- 1992: Der Himmel soll noch warten / Kanakenzerhaken
- 1992: Ich bin bei dir (with Joni Madden) / A so a Nocht
- 1992: Bleib bei mir / Der Himmel soll noch warten
- 1992: Richtung Süden / Bleib bei mir
- 1993: Das Duell (with Alexander Bisenz / Wididdaprettabuu
- 1994: I denk an di / Einsamkeit
- 1994: Alt und Jung / Einsamkeit
- 1995: Der bessere gewinnt! / Du verstehst mi ned
- 1996: Verwahrlost aber frei / Recht und Gnade
- 1996: Für immer jung (live) / Für immer jung
- 1997: Open House (Da Hofa / Schifoan / Tagwache / Zentralfriedhof)
- 1999: Herz aus Gold / A langer Weg
- 1999: Ich lieb Dich überhaupt nicht mehr / A Meinung
- 2001: Weihnachten wie immer / Frieden für an Moment

== See also ==
- List of Austrians in music
