= Georg Danzer =

Austrian singer-songwriter (1946–2007)

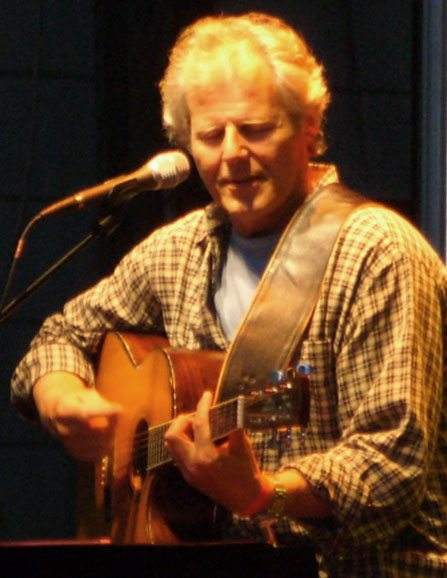
- Danzer in 2006

Background information
- Also known as: Schurl
- Born: Georg Danzer; 7 October 1946
- Origin: Vienna, Austria
- Died: 21 June 2007 (aged 60)
- Genres: Pop; Folk rock Blues
- Occupations: Musician, composer, singer-songwriter
- Instrument: Guitar
- Years active: 1967–2007
- Formerly of: Austria3

Georg Franz Danzer (7 October 1946, in Vienna – 21 June 2007, in Asperhofen, Lower Austria) was an Austrian singer-songwriter. Although he is credited as one of the pioneers of Austropop (most famous are his comic songs "Jö schau" (about a streaker at the Café Hawelka) and "Hupf' in Gatsch", both in Viennese German), he always refused to be part of this genre.

Danzer was successful as a solo artist, but also in the group Austria3, along with Wolfgang Ambros and Rainhard Fendrich. Besides his music, he translated two books from Spanish into German, and was strongly involved in highlighting social inequalities, opposing racism and any form of societal discrimination, and the lifestyle of the bourgeoisie for all his life. Danzer was romantic, funny, socially engaged – and often a misfit. Having been a strong smoker for decades, he abstained from smoking after being diagnosed with lung cancer, but nevertheless died from the disease. His legacy includes some 400 songs.

== Early life and education ==
Georg Danzer was the son of a communist Viennese magistrate. After his Matura (high school leaving certificate) he hitchhiked through Germany, the Netherlands and Italy. In autumn 1966 he applied for admission to the Academy of Fine Arts Vienna, but was not accepted; so instead he started studying Philosophy and Psychology in Vienna. In a 1968 ORF-Interview he stated his intention to study journalism, to which moderator Gerhard Bronner replied: "Shift to music soon, young man“.

== Career ==
=== Beginnings; „Jö schau“, 1967–1979 ===
In 1967 Danzer had started to write and play music after he returned from a longer hitchhiking tour of Crete, Hamburg, and Sweden. The next year he released his first single, Vera, and appeared on Austrian broadcast, but did not get a contract. Hitradio Ö3 editor Eva-Maria Kaiser took notice of him in 1970, and suggested that he could make a living by writing lyrics for "almost everybody in Vienna". During the next three years he wrote texts for Marianne Mendt, Margot Werner, Erika Pluhar, André Heller, Wolfgang Ambros and the singer Wilfried. With Heller, Mendt and other young musicians, „Schurli" often met in Gerhard Bronner's Cabaret Fledermaus.

During this time, singer-songwriters began to sing in Viennese German or even slang, exemplified by hits such as Wia a Glock'n (Marianne Mendt 1970; lyrics: Gerhard Bronner) and Da Hofa (Wolfgang Ambros 1971; lyrics by Joesi Prokopetz. For a while, Danzer was a member of the band The Madcaps and wrote a couple of their songs, among them Schneemensch, Sommer is, John Wayne.

In 1973, Danzer released the album Honigmond, which Danzer partially financed himself and flopped. In 1974, the concept album Der Tätowierer und die Mondprinzessin was released together with a book which he illustrated. In 1975 Jö schau, a comic song about a streaker at the Café Hawelka, became a No 1 in the Austrian charts and stayed there for 20 weeks. In the same year the album Ollas leiwand (Slang for "Everything's all right") was released.

1976 brought good news for Danzer: his first daughter, Daniela, was born, and he got a contract with a major label Polydor. Furthermore, English Music Week "Star of the Year", and five of his songs formed the soundtrack for the first Kottan ermittelt TV series.

Danzer moved towards Germany. In Berlin, the album Unter die Haut was produced in 1977.

=== Popularity and crisis, 1979–1990 ===
In 1979, the "Georg Danzer Tournee 79" included 32 shows, all of which had sold out. A double live album appeared in the following year. More successful albums soon followed (Traurig aber wahr 1980, Ruhe vor dem Sturm 1981). Even Austrians began to realize that Danzer was more than Jö schau. The ORF produced a 45-minutes feature, Danzer Direkt. In 1981, Danzer played 47 concerts solo (Live-Album Direkt), followed by an Open-Air-Tournee with Ludwig Hirsch, Konstantin Wecker, Chris de Burgh and Georges Moustaki. in 1982 he published Die gnädige Frau und das rote Reptil, a book with lyrics and prose. In 1983, Danzer was among the first German-language musicians who created a CD-album (…und so weiter).

In the summer of 1984, Danzer dissolved his band and went to Munich to produce Weiße Pferde. During the production of its video clip by Rudi Dolezal in Andalusia, he suffered a serious bike accident and had to be flown back to Vienna because of heavy injuries. In 1985, his wife Dagmara filed for divorce, his former manager disappeared, he got in trouble with the financial revenue services, and his contract with Polydor came to an end.

In 1986 he was signed by Teldec, which belonged to the Time-Warner group, and went to Spain to study Spanish, among other reasons. In 1988, he moved to Hamburg, travelled to Egypt and Kenya and was infected by malaria. In 1989, Danzer and his new life partner, Bettina, moved to a farm in Werl-Holtum (Westfalen), where he spent most of his time until 1994, and where he translated two works of the Spanish author Manuel Vicent.

=== Back to Vienna, 1990 ===
From 1990, Danzer spent again some time in Vienna and produced the album Wieder in Wien ("Back to Vienna"), with Peter Cornelius (guitar), Marianne Mendt (vocals) and Wilfried (vocals). The following tour of Austria was successful. In 1992 he married Bettina and his son Jonas was born.

His CD Nahaufnahme (featuring Hans Theessink, Dorretta Carter and others) was followed by a three-month tour of Austria, Germany and Switzerland in 1993. In 1994, another son, Jakob, was born, and the family moved to Austria. In 1995, the album Große Dinge (featuring Ulli Bäer, Gary Lux, Thomas Morá and Peter Barborik) was released, as well as an album of Viennese songs, Liada ohne Grund (with Adi Hirschal and Lukas Goldschmidt).

10 December 1997 was the birth of Austria3. Rainhard Fendrich had gathered two friends for a single charity event for homeless people and thereby created one of the most successful Austrian groups. In the same year, Danzer was the first European musician to publish a CD-Extra with multimedia content ($ex im Internet). Whilst touring with Austria3, he still produced solo albums.

In 2000, Danzer became president of the human rights organization "SOS Mitmensch". In 2002, the double CD Sonne & Mond was released, a retrospective of his 30 years on stage. In 2004, the album Persönlich was published with Wolfgang Puschnig (saxofone), Achim Tang (bass) and Christian Eigner (percussion), also featuring the singer Zabine and Katja Riemann.

=== Lung cancer, 2006–2007 ===
In September 2006 Danzer informed the public that he was suffering from lung cancer. He had to cancel two concerts scheduled for the following October, one in Wiener Stadthalle, the other one in Circus Krone, Munich. In December 2006 he was one of the supporters of activities alerting to the dangers of smoking (Österreichische Lungenunion). The previously cancelled Vienna concert took place on 16 April 2007, and his friends, Ambros and Fendrich, joined Danzer for a few songs to rekindle the spirit of former days. The concert was a perfect success, but also Georg Danzer's last appearance in public.

Danzer died at home on 21 June 2007, and was cremated the next day. He wanted to keep his burial place secret; almost none of his friends were invited to the funeral, except his long-time manager Franz Christian "Blacky" Schwarz, whose duty it was to inform the press a few hours after the burial had taken place. Danzer had stated before his death that, if it were offered to him by Viennese authorities, he would refuse an honorary grave ("Ehrengrab") usually bestowed to artists of high calibre .

== Discography ==
Albums

- 1972: Der Tschik
- 1973: Honigmond
- 1974: Der Tätowierer und die Mondprinzessin
- 1975: Danzer, Dean & Dracula
- 1975: Ollas leiwaund
- 1976: Du mi a
- 1976: Jö schau… Seine größten Erfolge
- 1977: Unter die Haut
- 1977: Des kaun do no ned ollas gwesn sein
- 1978: Ein wenig Hoffnung
- 1978: Narrenhaus
- 1978: Liederbuch
- 1979: Feine Leute
- 1979: Notausgang
- 1980: Traurig aber wahr
- 1980: Danzer Live – Tournee '79 (Live)
- 1981: Ruhe vor dem Sturm
- 1981: Direkt (Live)
- 1982: Jetzt oder nie
- 1983: … und so weiter
- 1984: Menschliche Wärme
- 1984: Weiße Pferde
- 1985: Alles aus Gold
- 1986: Danzer
- 1987: Liebes Leben!
- 1989: Rufze!chen
- 1990: Wieder in Wien
- 1991: Echt Danzer! – Solo (Live)
- 1991: Keine Angst
- 1992: Kreise
- 1993: Nahaufnahme
- 1995: Große Dinge
- 1997: $ex im Internet
- 1998: AUSTRIA3 – Live
- 1998: AUSTRIA3 – Live Vol. 2
- 1999: Atemzüge
- 2000: AUSTRIA3 – Die Dritte
- 2000: Raritäten
- 2001: 13 schmutzige Lieder
- 2002: Ausverkauft! – (Live) (as group DBB, with Ulli Bäer and Andy Baum)
- 2002: Sonne & Mond – Lieder & Geschichten aus 30 Jahren (Live)
- 2004: Persönlich
- 2005: Von Scheibbs bis Nebraska
- 2006: Gute Unterhaltung – Die besten Geschichten & Lieder (Live)
- 2006: Träumer
- 2007: Raritäten II

Austrian Charts – Singles

Jö schau
AT: 1 – 15 October 1975 – 20 Wo.
So a Dodl mid da Rodl
AT: 3 – 15 March 1976 – 8 Wo.
Hupf' in Gatsch
AT: 6 – 15 July 1976 – 16 Wo.
Zombieball
AT: 13 – 1 November 1983 – 6 Wo.
Atlantis
AT: 19 – 1 March 1984 – 2 Wo.
Doppelgänger
AT: 24 – 15 April 1986 – 2 Wo.

Austrian Charts – Alben

Ollas leiwaund
AT: 3 – 15 December 1975 – 16 Wo.
Jö schau
AT: 3 – 15 January 1977 – 8 Wo.
Narrenhaus
AT: 16 – 15 April 1978 – 4 Wo.
Ruhe vor dem Sturm
AT: 8 – 1 May 1981 – 10 Wo.
Jetzt oder nie
AT: 17 – 1 December 1982 – 4 Wo.
Und so weiter
AT: 12 – 1 October 1983 – 6 Wo.
Menschliche Wärme
CH: 25 – 8 April 1984 – 1 Wo.
Nahaufnahme
AT: 33 – 21 November 1993 – 1 Wo.
Grosse Dinge
AT: 28 – 30 April 1995 – 3 Wo.
Die größten Hits aus 25 Jahren
AT: 22 – 20 October 1996 – 7 Wo.
Atemzüge
AT: 37 – 26 September 1999 – 2 Wo.
13 schmutzige Lieder
AT: 33 – 8 April 2001 – 15 Wo.
Sonne & Mond
AT: 57 – 20 October 2002 – 3 Wo.
Persönlich
AT: 23 – 7 March 2004 – 6 Wo.
Von Scheibbs nach Nebraska
AT: 4 – 1 October 2005 – 11 Wo.
Gute Unterhaltung
AT: 16 – 19 May 2006 – 9 Wo.
Träumer
AT: 11 – 29 September 2006 – 20 Wo.
Raritäten II
AT: 16 – 1 June 2007 – 12 Wo.

== Awards ==
In 1993, he was the second singer/songwriter awarded with Swiss „Goldenes Ohr“. In 1995, Belgian broadcast awarded him with "Silver Antenna" for having most song's lyrics in schoolbooks, worldwide. In 1996, he got Vienna's "Goldener Rathausmann", presented by Grete Laska and Harry Kopietz. In 1999, Danzer, Ambros and Fendrich (Austria3) got „BASF Master Award". In 2005, Amadeus Austrian Music Award, "Best Album of 2004" in category "Pop Album National", for Persönlich. In 2007, a second "Amadeus" for his life's career.

== Literature ==
All books are in German.

By Danzer:

- Die gnädige Frau und das rote Reptil. Erzählungen, Lieder, Gedanken, Betrachtungen, Heyne 1982, ISBN 3-453-01585-1
- Auf und davon, Edition Tau 1993, ISBN 3-900977-43-7

Translations by Danzer (from Spanish)

- Manuel Vicent: Mein Name ist Kain, Residenz Verlag, Salzburg 1991, ISBN 3-7017-0695-6
- Manuel Vicent: Der Flug der erloschenen Schönheit, Residenz Verlag, Salzburg 1992, ISBN 3-7017-0739-1

On Danzer

- Kathrin Brigl (Interviews) und Siegfried Schmidt-Joos (Edition): Selbstredend… Rowohlt, Reinbek 1985, 252 S., Ill., Interviewporträts mit Gerorg Danzer, Klaus Hoffmann, Peter Horton, Heinz Rudolf Kunze, Reinhard Mey, Erika Pluhar, Hans Scheibner, Stephan Sulke
- Beate Dapper (Hrsg.): Liedermacher. Ulla Meinecke, Klaus Hoffmann, Georg Danzer, Hannes Wader, Reinhard Mey. Bund-Verlag, Frankfurt am Main 1998, 75 S., Ill., ISBN 978-3-7957-5685-7
- Georg Danzer: Jetzt oder nie. Im Gespräch mit Christian Seiler. Amalthea Signum, Wien 2006, 152 S., Gebunden, ISBN 978-3-85002-584-3
