= The Madcaps =

Austrian band

The Madcaps was an Austrian band that was founded before 1952 when it released "The Perfect Song" in Strasshof by Hans Kloiber.

The most successful songs were "I man i dram", "Schneemensch", and "Und wem's net gfoid, der soll sich haun über d'Häusa". Georg Danzer, one of the members who wrote some of their songs, later started a solo career.
