= Austria3 =

Austrian supergroup

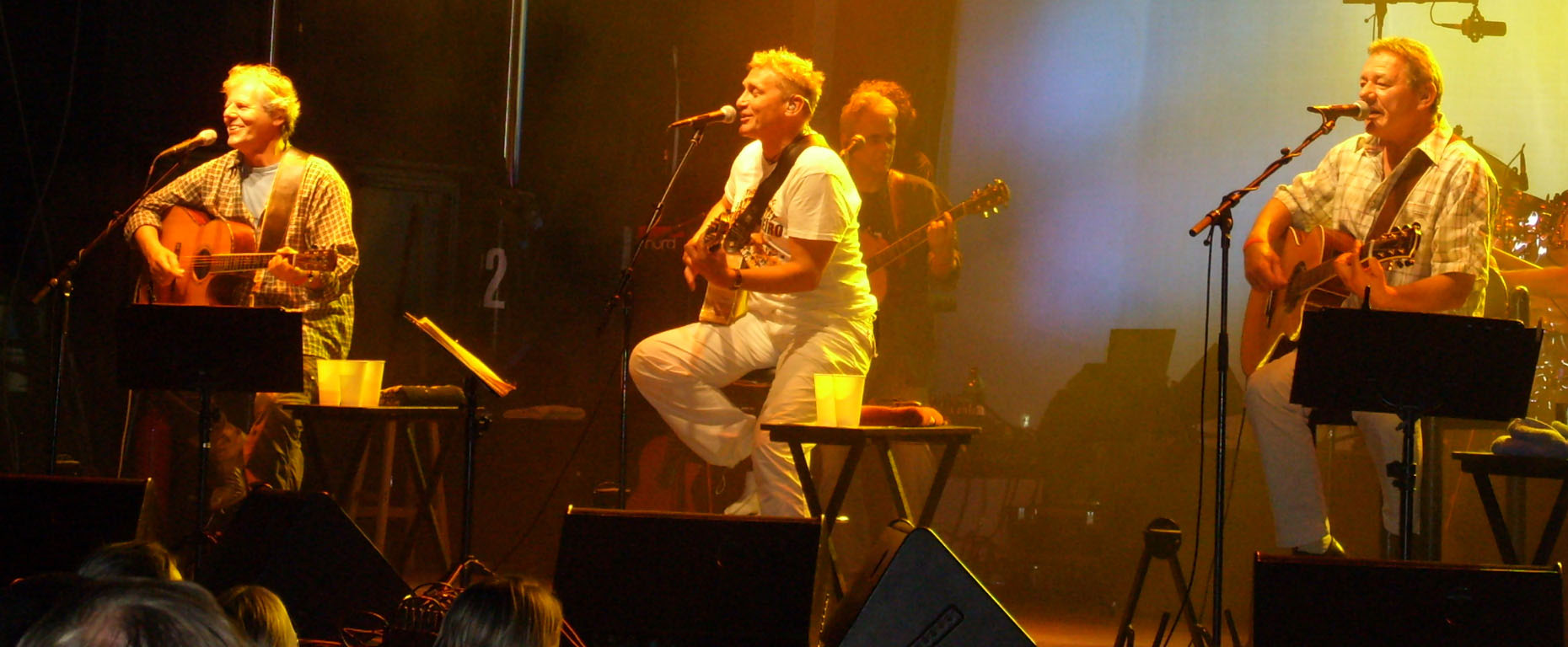
Imst in 2006 — from left: Georg Danzer, Rainhard Fendrich, Wolfgang Ambros.

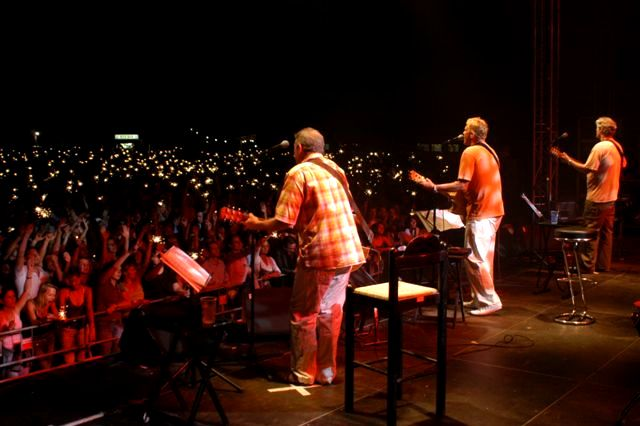
Krems, 2006.

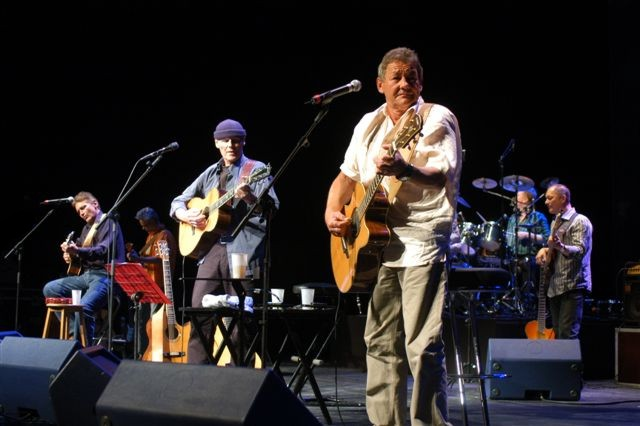
2007-04-16 from left: Fendrich, Danzer, Ambros.

Austria3 was a supergroup of three Austrian quite individualist singer-songwriters Wolfgang Ambros, Georg Danzer and Rainhard Fendrich.

The group was initiated by Fendrich in order to give one single charity concert in favour of homeless in 1997 (which collected more than ATS 2 million, almost USD 200,000). Their success as a group was overwhelming, and the three individualists showed up on stage as Austria3 from that day on, until they decided to stop that project, which they announced on 10 June 2006. Their last concert was given at Altusried, Germany, on 26 July 2006.

However, at Georg Danzer's comeback concert in Vienna on 16 April 2007, the three individuals met again [for just three songs] but even "thought in public" about possibly re-uniting in 2008. and sang a few of their old classics.

Georg Danzer died from lung cancer on 21 June 2007.

"Austria3 is history by now." (Rainhard Fendrich in front of 200,000 fans, Donauinselfest, on 23 June 2007).

== Discography ==
- Live Vol. 1 (1998)
- Freunde (CD Single, 1998)
- Live Vol. 2 (8 June 1998)
- Die Dritte (10 October 2000)
- Weusd' mei Freund bist — Das Beste von Austria3 — Live (16 June 2003)
- Weusd' mei Freund bist … Aus dem filmischen Tagebuch von Austria 3 (Double-DVD, 16 June 2003)
- Austropop Kult (18 October 2004)
- Nur das Beste (28 July 2006)
- Zwanzig (8 December 2017)

== References and external links ==
- Official website
