= List of Austrian musicians =

This is a list of Austrian composers, singers, conductors and bands:

== A ==
- Johann Georg Albrechtsberger (1736–1809), composer and music theorist
- August Wilhelm Ambros (1816–1876), composer
- Wolfgang Ambros (born 1952), singer (Austropop)
- Liane Augustin (1927–1978), singer

== B ==
- Paul Badura-Skoda (1927–2019), pianist
- Caroline Bayer (1758–1803), violinist and composer
- Nadine Beiler (born 1990), R&B and pop singer
- Johanna Beisteiner (born 1976), classical guitarist
- Alban Berg (1885–1935), composer, born in Vienna
- Walter Berry (1929–2000), bass-baritone
- Bilderbuch (founded in 2005), band
- Karl Böhm (1894–1981), conductor
- Norbert Brainin (1923–2005), violinist
- Timna Brauer (born 1961), singer-songwriter
- Alfred Brendel (1931–2025), pianist
- Anton Bruckner (1824–1896), composer
- Vincent Bueno (born 1985), singer

== C ==
- Amalia Carneri (1875–1943), Polish-born soprano opera singer
- Friedrich Cerha (1926–2023), composer and conductor
- Cosmó (born 2006), singer and songwriter
- Meena Cryle (born 1977), singer (Blues) and composer
- Carl Czerny (1791–1857), pianist and composer

== D ==
- Georg Danzer (1946-2007), singer songwriter (Austropop)
- Johann Nepomuk David (1895–1977), composer
- Anton Diabelli (1781–1858), publisher, editor and composer
- Wolfgang Dimetrik (born 1974), classical accordionist
- Carl Ditters von Dittersdorf (1739–1799), composer
- Nico Dostal (1895–1981), composer

== E ==
- Gottfried von Einem (1918–1996), composer
- Karlheinz Essl (born 1960), composer and electronic musician

== F ==
- Falco, (1957–1998), pop musician
- Rainhard Fendrich (born 1955), singer (Austropop)
- Christian Fennesz (born 1962), electronic musician
- Rudolf Fitzner (1868–1934), violinist and music teacher
- Thomas Forstner (born 1969), singer
- Petra Frey (born 1978), singer
- Gerhard Friedle (born 1971) better known by the stage name DJ Ötzi, dance pop musician and DJ
- Camilla Frydan (1887–1949), pianist, soubrette singer, composer and songwriter
- Robert Fuchs (1847–1927), composer and music scientist
- Johann Fux (c. 1660–1741), composer

== G ==
- Bernhard Gál (born 1971), composer and artist
- Ernest Gold (1921–1999), composer (winner of the Academy Award)
- Ferry Graf (1931–2017), singer
- Franz Gruber (1787–1863), composer ("Silent Night, Holy Night")
- Gerhard Gruber (born 1951), pianist and composer
- Heinz Karl Gruber (born 1943), composer
- Friedrich Gulda (1930–2000), pianist and composer
- Rico Gulda (born 1968), pianist and conductor

== H ==
- Georg Friedrich Haas (born 1953), composer of contemporary classical music
- Nikolaus Harnoncourt (1929–2016), famous contemporary conductor, mainly of early music
- Josef Matthias Hauer (1883–1959), composer and music theorist
- Joseph Haydn (1732–1809), author of "Imperial Hymn" now German Anthem
- Michael Haydn (1737–1806), composer (younger brother of Joseph Haydn)
- Hansi Hinterseer (born 1954), singer (Schlager)
- Franz Anton Hoffmeister (1754–1812), composer
- Roman Hofstetter (1742–1815), composer
- Wolfgang Holzmair (born 1952), baritone

== J ==
- Hanns Jelinek (1901–1969), composer (also known as Hanns Elin)
- JJ (born 2001), singer-songwriter, winner of the Eurovision Song Contest 2025
- Udo Jürgens (1934–2014), singer-songwriter, winner of the Eurovision Song Contest 1966
- Walter Jurmann (1903–1971), composer

== K ==
- Franz Kalchmair (1939–2020), opera singer
- Kaleen (born 1994), singer, dancer and choreographer
- Herbert von Karajan (1908–1989), conductor
- Natália Kelly (born 1994), singer
- King Electric (founded in 2005), pop duo
- Carlos Kleiber (1930–2004), conductor, son of Erich Kleiber
- Erich Kleiber (1890–1956), conductor
- Erich Wolfgang Korngold (1897–1957), composer (born in Brno, Austria-Hungary)
- Fritz Kreisler (1875–1962), violinist and composer
- Ernst Krenek (1900–1991), composer
- Kruder & Dorfmeister (founded in 1993), DJ and producer duo

== L ==
- Bill Leeb (born 1966), of Front Line Assembly. Born in Vienna, but currently lives in Vancouver, Canada
- György Ligeti (1923–2006), composer (born in Hungary, citizen of Austria)
- Lukas Ligeti (born 1965), composer
- Franz Liszt (1811–1886), composer (born in Raiding, then Hungary, now Austria)
- Lumix (born 2002), DJ and music producer
- Gary Lux (born 1959), singer

== M ==
- Gustav Mahler (1860–1911), composer, conductor
- Pia Maria (born 2003), singer
- Marianna Martines (1744–1812), composer, singer
- Marianne Mendt (born 1945), jazz singer and actress
- Johann Kaspar Mertz (1806–1856), guitarist and composer
- Felix Mottl (1856–1911), conductor and composer
- Wolfgang Amadeus Mozart (1756–1791), composer and musician, born in Salzburg

== N ==
- Olga Neuwirth (born 1968), composer

== O ==
- Opus (founded in 1973), rock band (Live is Life)
- Manuel Ortega (born 1980), singer

== P ==
- Paenda (born 1988), singer, songwriter and music producer
- Alf Poier (born 1967), artist and stand-up comedian
- Franz Pomassl (born 1966), electronic musician and sonic artist

== R ==
- Emil von Reznicek (1860–1945), composer
- Marcel Rubin (1905–1995), composer

== S ==
- Salena (born 1998), singer and songwriter
- Cesár Sampson (born 1983), singer, songwriter, producer, dancer and model
- Franz Schmidt (1874–1939), composer
- Arnold Schoenberg (1874–1951), composer
- Franz Schubert (1797–1828), composer and musician
- Eleonore Schwarz, singer
- Bettina Soriat (born 1967), singer
- Anita Spanner (born 1960), singer
- Hedi Stadlen (1916–2004), musicologist
- Max Steiner (1888–1971), composer, born in Vienna
- Simone Stelzer (born 1969), pop singer
- Zoë Straub (born 1996), singer, songwriter and actress
- Johann Strauss, Sr. (1809–1849), composer
- Johann Strauss, Jr. (1825–1899), composer
- Josef Strauss (1827–1870), composer
- Heinz Strobl (born 1952), composer and artist, goes by the name of Gandalf
- Franz von Suppé (1819–1895), composer, born in Split, Austrian Empire
- Hermann Szobel (born 1958), jazz fusion composer

== T ==
- Takanashi Kiara (active since 2020), VTuber and singer
- Teya (born 2000), singer and songwriter
- von Trapp, family of famous folk music vocalists and Anschluss refugees in 1938 and the main subjects of two 1950's German films named for them, The Trapp Family (1956) and its sequel The Trapp Family in America (1958) the first of which premiered in the U.S. in 1961, and of 1965's The Sound of Music.
- Nathan Trent (born 1992), singer

== V ==
- Johann Michael Vogl (1768–1840), baritone

== W ==
- Josef Wagner (1856–1908), composer, known for military marches
- Wanda (founded in 2012), band
- Stefan Weber (1946–2018), singer (Drahdiwaberl)
- Anton Webern (1883–1945), composer
- Tony Wegas (born 1965), singer and television actor
- Felix Weingartner (1863–1942), conductor, composer, pianist
- Egon Joseph Wellesz (1885–1974), composer, pupil of Arnold Schoenberg
- Franz Welser-Möst (born 1960), conductor
- Wilfried (1950–2017), singer-songwriter and actor
- Harry Winter (1914–2001), singer, musician and band director
- Hugo Wolf (1860–1903), composer (Slovenian origin)
- Ina Wolf (born 1954), singer and composer
- Peter Wolf (born 1952), producer
- Conchita Wurst (born 1988), singer, winner of the Eurovision Song Contest 2014

== Z ==
- Joe Zawinul (1932–2007), jazz musician, composer, born in Vienna
- Erich Zeisl (1905–1959), modernist composer
- Alexander von Zemlinsky (1871–1942), composer and conductor

== See also ==
- List of Austrians
- Austrian music
