= Razzia (song) =

Single by Rainhard Fendrich

from the album Zwischen eins und vier
- Released: 1982
- Recorded: 1982
- Genre: Austropop; new wave
- Length: 4:15
- Songwriter(s): R. Fendrich

Rainhard Fendrich singles chronology
"Schickeria" (1982)	"Razzia" (00000000)	"Oben ohne" (1982)

"Razzia" is a song recorded in 1982 by Austrian singer Rainhard Fendrich. It reached #9 in the Austrian charts.

== Charts ==
Chart (1982)	Peak position
Austria (Ö3 Austria Top 40)	9
