= Die Entführung aus dem Serail discography =

This is a partial discography of the Singspiel Die Entführung aus dem Serail by Wolfgang Amadeus Mozart, which was premiered at the Burgtheater in Vienna on 16 July 1782.

== Recordings ==
| Year | Cast (Konstanze, Blonde, Belmonte, Pedrillo, Osmin) | Conductor, Opera house and orchestra | Label | References |
|---|---|---|---|---|
| 1945 | Elisabeth Schwarzkopf; Emmy Loose; Anton Dermota; Peter Klein; Herbert Alsen | Rudolf Moralt; Wiener Rundfunk-Sinfonieorchester | Gala; Cat: GL100.501 | |
| 1949 | Sári Barabás; Rita Streich; Anton Dermota; Helmut Krebs; Josef Greindl | Ferenc Fricsay; Deutsches Symphonie-Orchester Berlin | Walhall; Cat: WLCD 0043 | |
| 1950 | Wilma Lipp; Emmy Loose; Walther Ludwig; Peter Klein; Endre Koréh | Josef Krips; Vienna Philharmonic orchestra | Decca Records; Cat: LXT 2536-2538 | |
| 1954 | Maria Stader; Rita Streich; Ernst Haefliger; Martin Vantin; Josef Greindl | Ferenc Fricsay; Deutsches Symphonie-Orchester Berlin | Deutsche Grammophon; Cat: 457730 | |
| 1956 | Erika Köth; Hanny Steffek; Anton Dermota; Murray Dickie; Josef Greindl | Karl Böhm; Hessischer Rundfunk Radio orchestra & chorus | Walhall Eternity Series; Cat: WLCD 0188 | |
| | Lois Marshall; Ilse Hollweg; Léopold Simoneau; Gerhard Unger; Gottlob Frick | Thomas Beecham; Royal Philharmonic Orchestra; Beecham Choral Society | Columbia; Cat: 33CX 1462–3 | |
| 1961 | Ruth-Margret Pütz; Renate Holm; Fritz Wunderlich; Erwin Wohlfahrt; Gyorgy Littasy | István Kertész; Mozarteum Orchestra Salzburg; Vienna State Opera chorus | Operadepot.com; Cat: | |
| 1965 | Erika Köth; Lotte Schädle; Fritz Wunderlich; Friedrich Lenz; Kurt Böhme | Eugen Jochum; Bavarian Radio Symphony Orchestra; Bavarian Radio Symphony chorus | Deutsche Grammophon; Cat: 459424 | |
| 1966 | Anneliese Rothenberger; Lucia Popp; Nicolai Gedda; Gerhard Unger; Gottlob Frick | Josef Krips; Vienna Philharmonic; Vienna State Opera chorus | EMI Classics; Cat: 63263 | |
| 1967 | Ingeborg Hallstein; Reri Grist; Luigi Alva; Gerhard Unger; Fernando Corena | Zubin Mehta; Vienna Philharmonic; Vienna State Opera chorus | DVD: VAI; Cat: 4521 | |
| | Mattiwilda Dobbs; Jenifer Eddy; Nicolai Gedda; John Fryatt; Noel Mangin | Yehudi Menuhin; Bath Festival orchestra Ambrosian Singers (sung in English) | Chandos Records; Cat: CHAN 3081 | |
| 1973 | Arleen Auger; Reri Grist; Peter Schreier; Harald Neukirch; Kurt Moll | Karl Böhm; Staatskapelle Dresden orchestra Leipzig Radio chorus | Deutsche Grammophon; Cat: 429868 | |
| 1978 | Christiane Eda-Pierre; Norma Burrowes; Stuart Burrows; Robert Tear; Robert Lloyd | Colin Davis; Academy of St Martin in the Fields; John Alldis Choir | CD: Philips Records; Cat: 422 810-2 | |
| 1980 | Carolyn Smith-Meyer; Barbara Sternberger; Armin Uhde; Uwe Peper; Rolf Tomaszewski | Peter Gülke; Semperoper orchestra and chorus | VHS: V.I.E.W. Video | |
| 1985 | Edita Gruberová; Kathleen Battle; Gösta Winbergh; Heinz Zednik; Martti Talvela | Georg Solti; Vienna Philharmonic; Vienna State Opera chorus | CD: Decca; Cat: 417402 | |
| 1989 | Yvonne Kenny; Lillian Watson; Peter Schreier; Wilfred Gahmlich; Matti Salminen | Nikolaus Harnoncourt; Mozartorchester des Opernhauses Zürich; Chor des Opernhauses Zürich | CD: Teldec; Cat: 2292-42643-2 | |
| 1990 | Lynne Dawson; Marianne Hirsti; Uwe Heilmann; Wilfried Gahmlich; Gunter von Kannen | Christopher Hogwood; Academy of Ancient Music & chorus | CD: L'Oiseau-Lyre; Cat: 473804 | |
| 1991 | Luba Orgonášová; Cyndia Sieden; Stanford Olsen; Uwe Peper; Cornelius Hauptmann | John Eliot Gardiner; English Baroque Soloists; Monteverdi Choir | CD: Archiv; Cat: 458102 | |
| 1996 | Ingrid Habermann; Donna Ellen; Piotr Bezcala; Oliver Ringelhahn; Franz Kalchmair | Martin Sieghart; Bruckner Orchestra Linz | CD: Arte Nova Classics; Cat: 74321497012 | |
| 1997 | Christine Schäfer; Patricia Petibon; Ian Bostridge; Iain Paton; Alan Ewing | William Christie; Les Arts Florissants | CD: Erato Records; Cat: 3984-25490-2 | |
| 1999 | Yelda Kodalli; Desirée Rancatore; Paul Groves; Lynton Atkinson; Peter Rose | Charles Mackerras; Scottish Chamber Orchestra & chorus | CD: Telarc; Cat: 80544 | |
| 2015 | Diana Damrau; Anna Prohaska; Rolando Villazón; Paul Schweinester; Franz-Josef Selig | Yannick Nézet-Séguin; Chamber Orchestra of Europe; Vocalensemble Rastatt | CD: Deutsche Grammophon; Cat: | |
