= Jean Madeira =

American operatic contralto (1918–1972)

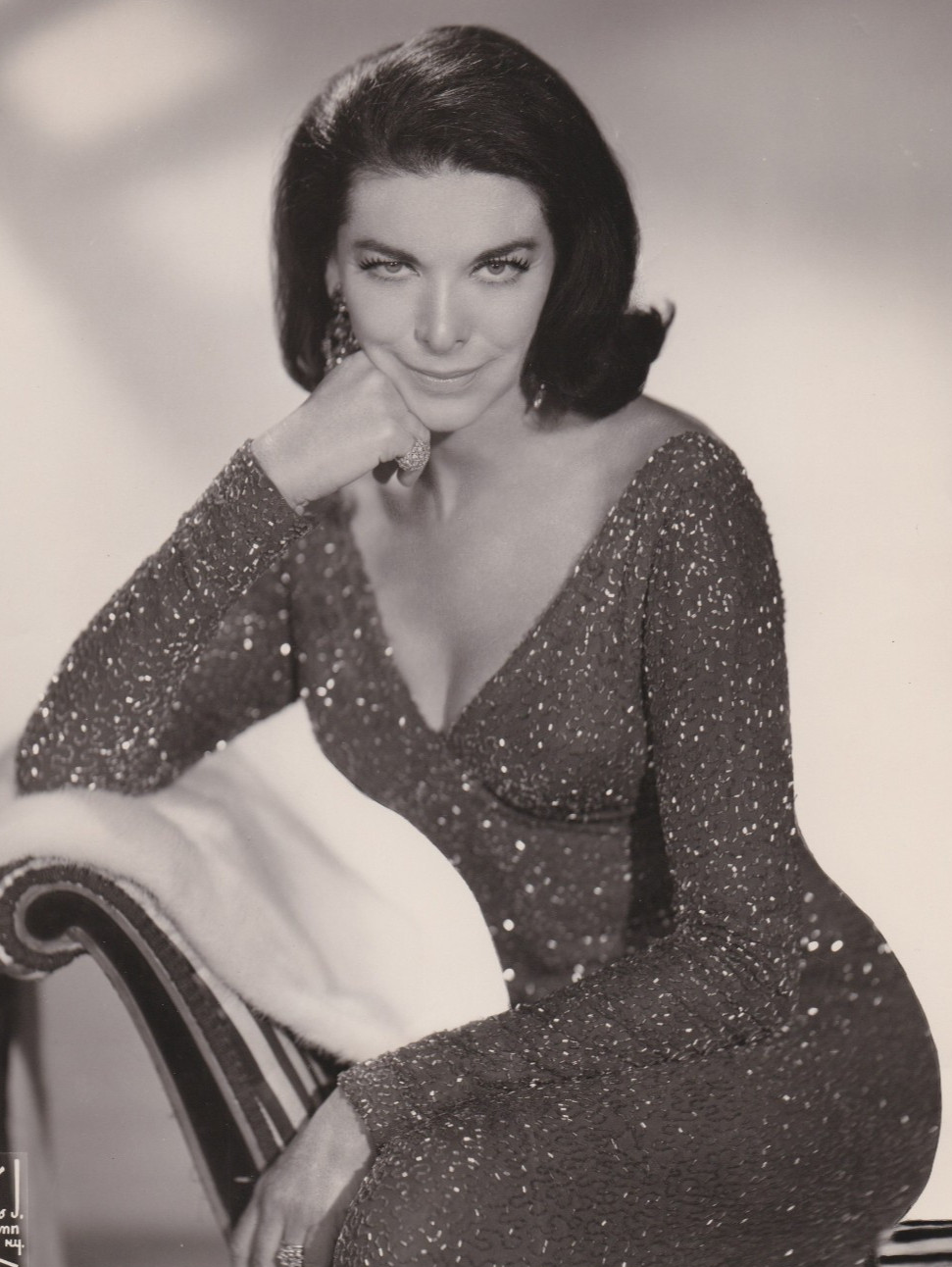
- Madeira in 1966
- Born: Jean Browning; November 14, 1918; Christopher, Illinois, U.S.
- Died: July 11, 1972 (aged 53); Providence, Rhode Island, U.S.
- Education: Juilliard School
- Occupation: Contralto
- Spouse: Francis Madeira (m. 1947)
- Relatives: Amy Beth Kirsten (second cousin)

Jean Madeira, née Jean Browning (November 14, 1918 – July 11, 1972) was an American contralto, particularly known for her work in late-romantic German repertoire such as the operas of Richard Wagner and Richard Strauss.

== Biography ==
Madeira was born in Christopher, Illinois. Her father was a half-Cherokee coal miner.

When she was a child, her family moved to East St. Louis, Illinois, where she attended high school, and she later studied with Florence Kimball at the Juilliard School in New York City. She made her debut in opera in Chatauqua as Nancy in Martha, by Flotow. In 1955, the singer and actress successfully sang the title role in Carmen with the Vienna State Opera. She sang approximately 300 times at the Metropolitan Opera in forty-one roles, between 1948 and 1971. Her last appearance there was in Elektra, opposite Birgit Nilsson and Leonie Rysanek. Jean Madeira was a second-cousin of the composer Amy Beth Kirsten.

Madeira's television debut occurred on The Ed Sullivan Show on February 19, 1956.

She married Francis Madeira in 1947 and thereafter used her married name as her professional name. Madeira had been ill for two years when she died on July 11, 1972, at her home in Providence, Rhode Island, aged 53.

== Abridged discography ==
- Bizet: Carmen as Carmen (Filacuridi; Dervaux, 1957) Pathé
- Britten: Peter Grimes (Jon Vickers; 1967) Immortal Performances
- Falla: Three Cornered Hat (Vienna Symphony) Tuxedo Music
- Mozart: Le nozze di Figaro as Marcellina (Siepi, Conner, Valdengo, de los Angeles; Met, Fritz Reiner, 1952) Myto
- Mozart: Requiem in D Minor, K.626 (NBC Symphony, Arturo Toscanini, 1950) RCA Victor
- Pochielli: La Gioconda as La Cieca (Milanov, Warren, Barbieri, Siepi; Met, Cleva, 1953) Gala
- Puccini: Madama Butterfly as Suzuki (Steber, Tucker, Valdengo; Met, Rudolf, 1949) Sony
- Puccini: Manon Lescaut (Kirsten, J.Björling, Valdengo; Met, Antonicelli, 1949) Myto
- Saint-Saëns: Samson et Delilah as Delilah (Del Monaco; Teatro di San Carlo, Molinari-Pradelli, 1959) Hardy Classic
- Strauss: Elektra as Clytemnestra (Borkh, Schech, Uhl, Fischer-Dieskau; Böhm, 1960) DG
- Strauss: Elektra, as Clytemnestra (Nilsson, Rysanek, Nagy, Stewart; Met, Bohm, 1971) Met On Demand
- Verdi: Aida as Amneris (Rysanek, London, Frick, Hopf; Vienna State Opera, Kubelik, 1955) Orfeo
- Verdi: Requiem (Vienna Symphony, Erich Kleiber 1955) Melodram
- Verdi: Un ballo in maschera as Ulrica (Bergonzi, Rysanek, Merrill; Santi, 1962) Living Stage
- Wagner: Das Rheingold as Erda (Flagstad, London; Solti, 1958) Decca
- Wagner: Die Walkure as Fricka (Nilsson, Rysanek, Ludwig, Hotter, Frick, Suthaus; La Scala, Karajan, 1958) Myto; IDIS
- Wagner: Der Ring des Nibelungen as Erda, Rossweisse & First Norn (Bayreuth, Knappertsbusch, 1956) Orfeo
- Wagner Parsifal (Svanholm, Varnay, London, Hotter; Met, Stiedry, 1954) Adonis

== Other sources ==
- Elektra (27 February 1971), Metropolitan Opera Archives
- Madeira, Jean (Mezzo-soprano) on the MetOpera Database
