= Amalia Carneri =

Austrian soprano opera and operetta performer

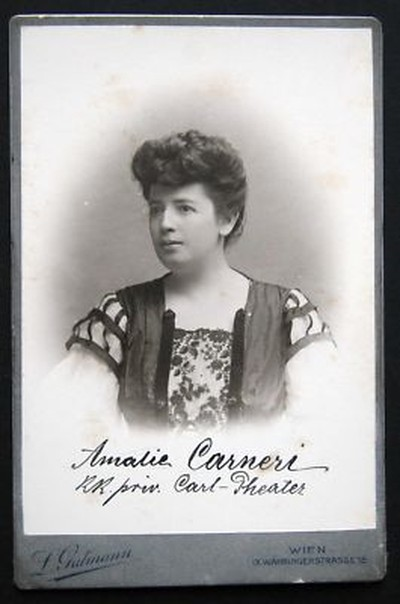
Amalia Carneri, 1908

Amalia Carneri (also Amalie) is the artist name of Amalie Malka Pollak, born Malka Kanarvogel, (September 12, 1875 – 1942 or later during the Holocaust), a soprano opera and operetta singer based in Vienna, Austria. She performed in several of Vienna's most prestigious concert venues and made several recordings.

== Life ==
She was born Malka Kanarvogel in Rzeszow, Austro-Hungarian Empire, on September 12, 1875. She studied music performance at the Vienna Conservatory, and changed her name to a more operatic-sounding "Amalia Carneri". In her private life she used the name Amalie.

She married government mine inspector Heinrich (Henryk) Pollak (b. June 7, 1877 in Krakow, d. October 7, 1938) in Vienna at the Seitenstettengasse synagogue. Together they had two sons. Fritz (Fred), who became a design engineer, was born on February 28, 1909, and Karl (Charles), who became an engineering professor for the University of Rhode Island, was born on January 15, 1920, both in Vienna.

Carneri had an international singing career which included tours of Austria, France, Germany, and Hungary. The locations of her performances included the Deutsches Theater in Plzeň, the Eden Theater in Strasbourg, and the Stadttheater, Landestheater, Carl-Theater, and the Volkstheater in Vienna. Between 1905 and 1907 she made several phonograph recordings for Edison Records, Odeon Records and Zonophone Records. Her initial mention in the Vienna newspaper Neue Freie Presse was very positive, describing a successful recital in 1898 that was met with enthusiasm by the public.

In May 1938, Carneri and her husband were still listed as living at Praterstraße 54 in Vienna. By October 1938, Carneri had been forced to leave her family home, was concerned about the political climate following the March 1938 invasion and Anschluss—the annexation of the Federal State of Austria by Nazi Germany—and was hoping to join her son Fritz (Fred) in the United States. Some time between 1940 and 1942 Carneri's son Fritz (Fred) Pollak funded a deposit account—Case No. 12234—with the Jewish Transmigration Bureau to try and get Carneri out of Austria.

Carneri's last apartment was in Vienna's Untere Donaustraße 33, on the Danube Canal. She was deported from Vienna on September 10, 1942, on Transport IV/10, as no. 861; of the 1,006 transported, only 98 survived. She was interned at the Theresienstadt concentration camp. From there, on September 29, 1942, at the age of 68, she and 2,001 other prisoners were taken by Holocaust train to the Treblinka extermination camp; none survived. Her recorded number on this transport was 973.

== Selected recordings ==
- 1905: "Du Süße, Süße", from Schützenliesl. Amalie Carneri, soprano, Max Rohr, tenor
- 1907: "D' lustigen Weanaleut'". Amalie Carneri, Rudolf Kronegger, Edison label
- 1907: Oscar Straus, "Ich bin a Weaner Madl, ich eine Kammerfrau" from Ein Walzertraum. Odéon, Amalie Carneri, soprano, Mizzi Jezel, soprano
- 1907: Oscar Straus, "Ich hab' einen Mann" from Ein Walzertraum. Amalie Carneri, soprano, Helene Merviola, soprano
- 1907: "Mei Muatterl war a Weanerin". Amalie Carneri, Ludwig Gruber, Edison label
- 1907: Oscar Straus, "O du Lieber, o du G'scheiter" from Ein Walzertraum. Amalie Carneri, soprano, Max Rohr, tenor.
- 1910: Offenbach, "Barcarolle: Schöne Nacht, du Liebesnacht" from Les contes d'Hoffmann. Label: Odéon, Amalie Carneri, soprano, Willy Strehl, tenor

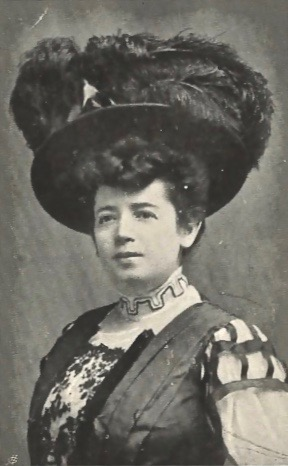
Amalia Carneri, from the program note to the 400th performance of Ein Walzertraum on May 19, 1908.

There is also a Zonophone recording of her singing Mendelssohn's "Spring Song" recorded at the Nationaltheater in Lviv.

== See also ==
- List of Austrians in music
