= Notre Dame (opera) =

Romantic opera by Franz Schmidt

Notre Dame is a romantic opera by Franz Schmidt, to a libretto by himself and Leopold Wilk (1876–1944), a professional chemist and amateur poet. It is based loosely on the 1831 novel The Hunchback of Notre-Dame by Victor Hugo.

== Composition ==
The opera was written between 1904 and 1906. Schmidt approached the opera by writing the orchestral parts of the score first, adding the vocal parts in later. He incorporated some material from an unfinished fantasia for piano and orchestra.

Notre Dame was rejected by the director of the Vienna Court Opera, Gustav Mahler, so its world premiere did not occur for nearly a decade, finally reaching the stage in Vienna on 1 April 1914. The principal female role of Esmeralda was created by Marie Gutheil-Schoder.

The work was popular till the early 1920s, then faded from view. It has been revived in Vienna and Dresden, and has been recorded at least twice.

The opera is best known for its orchestral Intermezzo, which was first performed, along with the Carnival Music, on 6 December 1903 in Vienna, as Zwischenspiel aus einer unvollständigen romantischen Oper. These pieces were not composed with any opera in mind, but were later incorporated into Notre Dame, which he started writing in August 1904. The composer and violinist Karl Goldmark described the Intermezzo as "the most beautiful of Gypsy music".

== Roles ==
Role	Voice type	Premiere: 1 April 1914, Vienna
Esmeralda	soprano	Marie Gutheil-Schoder
Gringoire	tenor	William Miller
Phoebus	tenor	Georg Maikl
Quasimodo	bass	Richard Mayr
Archdeacon	baritone	Friedrich Weidemann

== Revivals ==
- 1938, Vienna State Opera
- 1949, Vienna State Opera
- 1975, Vienna Volksoper, starring Julia Migenes, Walter Berry
- 2010, Dresden Semperoper starring Camilla Nylund (Esmeralda), Robert Gambill (Phoebus), Oliver Ringelhahn (Gringoire), Markus Butter (Archdeacon), Jan-Hendrik Rootering (Quasimodo), conducted by Gerd Albrecht

== Recordings ==
- 1949, Karl Ostertag (tenor), Wilhelm Schlichting (baritone), Hanne Munch (mezzo-soprano), Max Proebstl (bass), Hans Hopf (tenor), Hilde Scheppan (soprano), Bavarian Radio Symphony Orchestra under Hans Altmann
- 1988, Dame Gwyneth Jones (Esmeralda), James King (Phoebus), Kurt Moll (Quasimodo), Horst Laubenthal (Gringoire), Hartmut Welker (Archdeacon); Andreas Juffinger, Hans Helm, Kaja Borris, with Berlin Radio Symphony Orchestra under Christof Perick.
