= Oben ohne =

Single by Rainhard Fendrich

from the album Zwischen eins und vier
- Released: 1982
- Recorded: 1982
- Genre: Austropop; new wave; folk rock
- Length: 4:30
- Songwriter: R. Fendrich

Rainhard Fendrich singles chronology
"Razzia" (1982)	"Oben ohne" (1982)	"Es lebe der Sport" (1982)

"Oben ohne" is a song recorded in 1982 by Austrian singer Rainhard Fendrich. It reached #1 in the Austrian charts.

== Charts ==
Chart (1982)	Peak position
Austria (Ö3 Austria Top 40)	1
West Germany (GfK)	24
