= Strada del Sole =

Single by Rainhard Fendrich

from the album Und alles is ganz anders word'n
- Released: 1981
- Recorded: 1981
- Genre: Austropop; soft rock; folk rock; acoustic rock; italian music
- Length: 3:19
- Songwriter(s): R. Fendrich

Rainhard Fendrich singles chronology
"Zweierbeziehung" (1981)	"Strada del Sole" (00000003)	"Schickeria" (1982)

"Strada del Sole" is a song recorded in 1981 by Austrian singer Rainhard Fendrich. The song reached #1 in his home country and was his first of several No. 1 hits. It was also the lead single of his second album Und alles is ganz anders word'n.

The song is written in Viennese German, but with several Italianisms included, such as Mei Freindin is oposcht mit an Italiano (My girlfriend has gone away with an Italian). It is about a young man from Vienna who went for a holiday together with his girlfriend in Italy, but then one of the natives flirted with his girlfriend, and then she went away with him. Now he has no money, but he wants to go back to Vienna so badly. He ends the song with: I steh aufs Gänseheifl (Gänsehäufl = outdoor public swimming pool in Vienna), auf Italien pfeif i!.
