= Erobict, sierobict =

Single by Rainhard Fendrich

Single by Rainhard Fendrich

from the album Auf und Davon
- Released: 1983
- Recorded: 1983
- Genre: Austropop; funk; soul
- Length: 4:36
- Songwriter(s): R. Fendrich

Rainhard Fendrich singles chronology
"Es lebe der Sport" (1982)	"Erobict, sierobict" (1983)	"Ich bin ein Negerant, Madame" (1984)

"Erobict, sierobict" is a song recorded in 1983 by Austrian singer Rainhard Fendrich. It reached #19 in the Austrian charts.

== Charts ==
Chart (1983)	Peak position
Austria (Ö3 Austria Top 40)	19
