= August Wilhelm Ambros =

Austria music historian and critic (1816–1876)

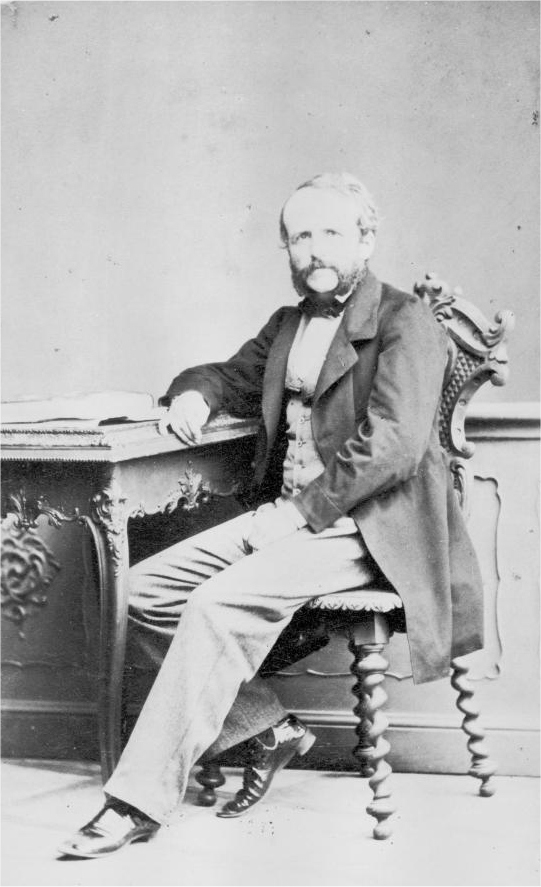
Ambros in 1862 by Moriz Ludwig Winter

August Wilhelm Ambros (17 November 1816 – 28 June 1876) was an Austrian music historian, critic and composer of Czech descent.

== Life ==
He was born in Mýto, Rokycany District, Bohemia. His father was a cultured man, and his mother was the sister of Raphael Georg Kiesewetter (1773–1850), the musical archaeologist and collector. Ambros studied at the University of Prague and was well-educated in music and the arts, which were his abiding passion. He was, however, destined for the law and an official career in the Austrian civil service, and from 1839 he occupied various important posts under the ministry of justice, music being an avocation.

From 1850 onwards, he became well known as a critic and essay-writer, and in 1860 he began working on his magnum opus, his History of Music, which was published at intervals from 1862 in five volumes, the last two (1878, 1882) being edited and completed by Otto Kade and Friedrich Wilhelm Langhans.

Ambros was a professor of the history of music at Prague from 1869 to 1871. Also in Prague, he sat on the board of governors in the Prague Royal Conservatory. By 1872, he was living in Vienna and was employed by the Department of Justice as an officer and by Prince Rudolf's family as his tutor. Through his work in Vienna, he was given a leave of absence for half the year in order to let him travel the world to collect musical information to include in his History of Music book. He was an excellent pianist, and the author of numerous compositions reminiscent of Felix Mendelssohn.

Ambros died at Vienna in 1876, aged 59.

== Selected writings ==
- —— (1893). "Chapter 5". In Kade, Otto (ed.). Geschichte der Musik [History of Music] (in German). Vol. 3 (3rd ed.). Leipzig: F. E. C. Leuckart Verlag.

== See also ==
- List of Austrians in music
