= Rainhard Fendrich =

Austrian musician (born 1955)

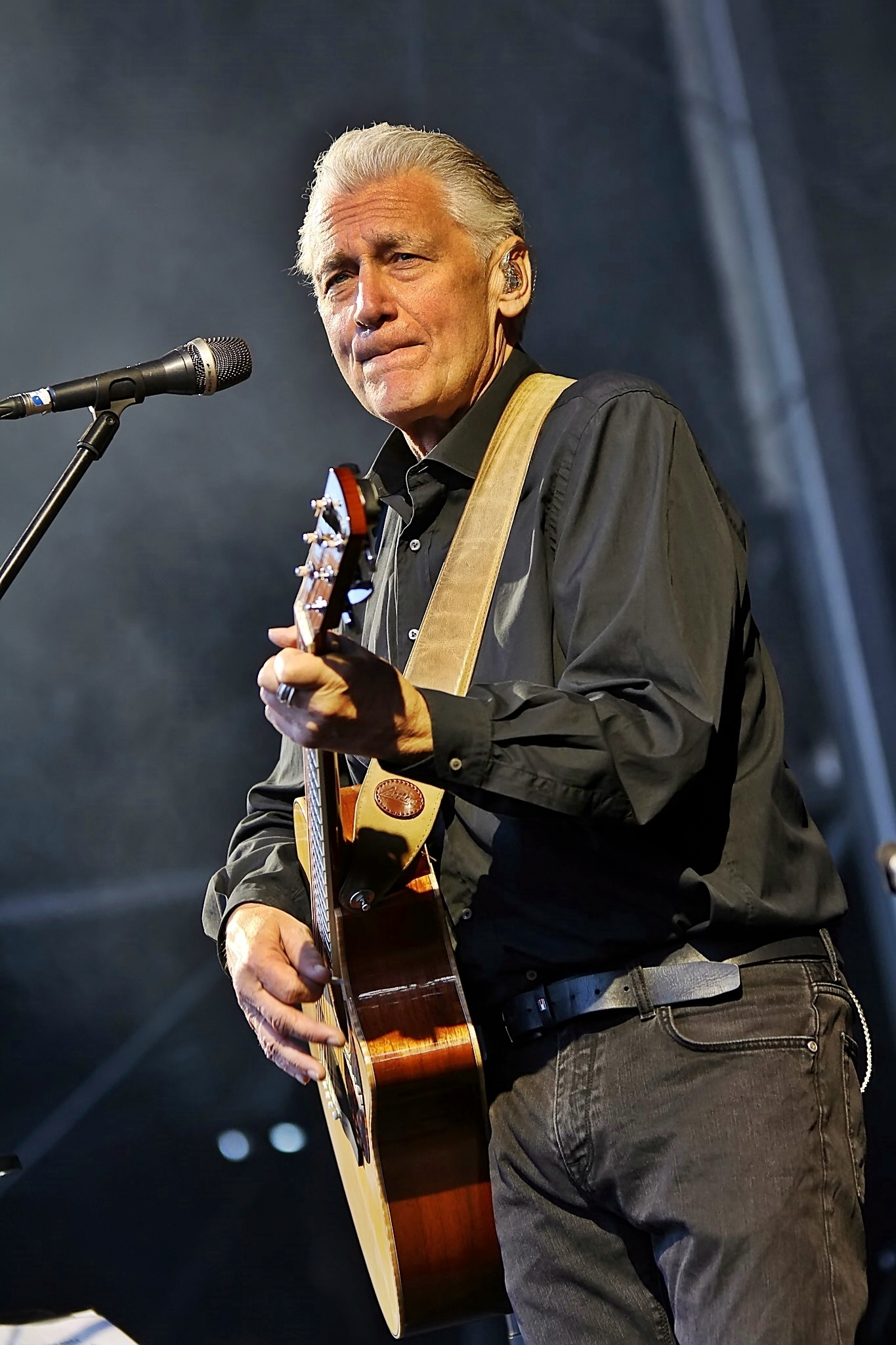
- Fendrich in concert in 2022

Background information
- Also known as: Raini
- Born: Rainhard Jürgen Fendrich; 27 February 1955 (age 71); Vienna, Austria
- Genres: Pop, folk rock, new wave, austropop
- Occupations: Singer-songwriter, actor, television presenter
- Instruments: Vocals, guitar
- Years active: 1980–present
- Website: www.fendrich.at

Rainhard Jürgen Fendrich (born 27 February 1955) is an Austrian singer-songwriter. He is one of the most successful Austropop musicians, and his songs are written in Viennese German. He is very popular in Austria and in Bavaria, but less so in other German-speaking countries and regions. His 1990 song "I Am from Austria" (its lyrics, except for the title, are in Viennese German) is still popular in Austria and considered to be the "unofficial national anthem".

== Early life and education ==
Fendrich was born on 27 February 1955 in Vienna. His mother was a Sudeten German while his father's family originated from Serbia. His father was a mechanical engineer, his mother a model. He has a brother, Harald Fendrich, who is six years younger than him and also a musician who played the bass guitar in his band and is now part of WIR4 (Ulli Bäer, Gary Lux, Harry Stampfer). At the age of ten, Fendrich was sent to a Catholic boarding school, where he lived until the age of 17. There, he was an altar boy and sang in the choir. His piano lessons were cancelled because he was too bad at mathematics. According to his own statements, he thought he was "chubby" and not very attractive as a child. When he got a guitar at the age of 15, he taught himself the chords and also began to write lyrics. Frustrating experiences with girls at that time find their expression later, for example in the songs "Cyrano" (1991) or "Frieda" (2001). He dropped out of law school in order to finance acting and singing lessons by working various jobs.

== Music career ==
=== Beginning of career and commercial breakthrough (1980–1986) ===
Fendrich appeared at the Theater an der Wien from 1980 (in Die Gräfin vom Naschmarkt and Chicago) and played Judas in the musical Jesus Christ Superstar there in 1982. In 1980 he was also engaged by Hans Gratzer for a performance series of Hamlet at the Schauspielhaus, made one of his first television appearances as a singer on the ORF program Wir-extra for the benefit of children in the Third World, and received his first recording contract.

Another appearance followed in Tritsch Tratsch in 1981 with the song Zweierbeziehung (Two-way relationship of a man with his car). The debut album Ich wollte nie einer von denen sein (I never wanted to be one of them) was released in May of the same year, but initially failed to achieve high sales figures.

In August 1981, he landed the Austrian summer hit of the year with Strada del sole (in a similar style, about a "vacation relationship"). The single sold 99,000 copies in Austria, which would correspond to today's status of triple platinum. Moreover, in 2020 the song was voted 14th among the "100 most important Austrian pop songs" by the pop culture magazine The Gap as part of the AustroTOP ranking. Equally successful was the second album Und alles ist ganz anders word'n (And everything has become completely different). The next number one hits followed in 1982 with Schickeria and Oben Ohne (Topless). At that time Fendrich was already celebrated as a shooting star of Austropop.

In 1983, Fendrich presented his first compilation called A winzig klaner Tropfen Zeit (A tiny drop of time). In the same year he also performed with Wolfgang Ambros at the School Closing Open Air in Vienna's Gerhard-Hanappi Stadium. This concert was released on a live compilation with the album Open Air.

Fendrich achieved his next success in 1983 with Auf und davon (Up and away). Although the album couldn't quite meet the commercial expectations of the previous album and the singles didn't manage that either, Fendrich performed at several sold-out concerts on his tour. This led to the song Weus'd a Herz hast wia a Bergwerk (Cause you have a heart like a mine) being available twice as a single; in a studio version and in a live version.

After a short retreat from the public eye, the albums Wien bei Nacht (Vienna by night) and Kein schöner Land (No country more beautiful) were released in 1985 and 1986. He also released another live compilation.

=== Breakthrough in Germany (1988–1997) ===
With Macho Macho, sung largely in Viennese, another one of Fendrich's singles reached the top position in 1988. In addition, this was followed by the big breakthrough in Germany with number 2. Fendrich also achieved a top 3 position in Switzerland. He wrote the song in five minutes, it was inspired by an article in Brigitte magazine.

Equally well known in Austria and Germany is his appearance with Reinhard Mey, with Ein Loch in der Kanne (A hole in the pot) in the television program Was wäre wenn (What if) in 1988.

In 1989, the album Von Zeit zu Zeit (From time to time) was released, which could not meet Fendrich's commercial expectations. The singles Von Zeit zu Zeit and I Am from Austria were also not successful at first. Later, however, the title I Am from Austria developed into the "secret federal anthem of Austria" and was voted the "greatest Austropop hit of all time" in 2011 as part of the ORF program Österreich wählt (Austria votes). In May 1990, Fendrich performed at the World Music Awards in Monaco, where he received an award for World's Best-Selling Austrian Artist.

In 1991, the album Nix is fix (Nothing is final), produced by Tato Gomez at BMG Ariola, was released, which could repeat the success of earlier times. The album stayed in the Austrian charts for 32 weeks and was number 1 for five weeks.

A year later, Fendrich performed with the Vienna Symphony Orchestra at the opening of the Vienna Festival. Under the project "Vienna Symphonic Orchestra Project" (VSOP), by and with Christian Kolonovits, who conducted the concert and in which the Arnold Schoenberg Choir also participated. This concert was released as an album and after some time made it to the first place in the Austrian music charts.

Fendrich took over as host of the ARD program Herzblatt (Sweetheart) in 1993 after Rudi Carrell, which he presented on German television until 1997. In the same year, he launched the comedy show Nix is fix (ORF/ARD). The cabaret and media-critical format was not continued despite good reviews.

A special postage stamp was issued by the Austrian Post Office in 1993.

Along the way, Fendrich recorded the album Brüder (Brothers), which also managed to place in Germany after a long time. The singles Midlife Crisis and Brüder, which were rather unpopular in Austria, made it into the German charts. The album was, despite the great commercial success, rather negatively received by the media in Fendrich's home country. The reason for this was that Fendrich slowly turned away from the Viennese dialect with this album. As a promotion for Herzblatt, the ballads album Lieder mit Gefühl (Songs with feeling) was also presented.

In the mid-1990s, Fendrich did not release any music. He made his comeback with the album Blond (Blonde). The title song became his last major number one hit to date. The single Blond sold 10,000 copies in Austria and was awarded gold. In addition, after the programming reform of the Austrian station Ö3, the song was one of the few Austrian songs played on the radio.

=== Return to Austria (from 1997) ===
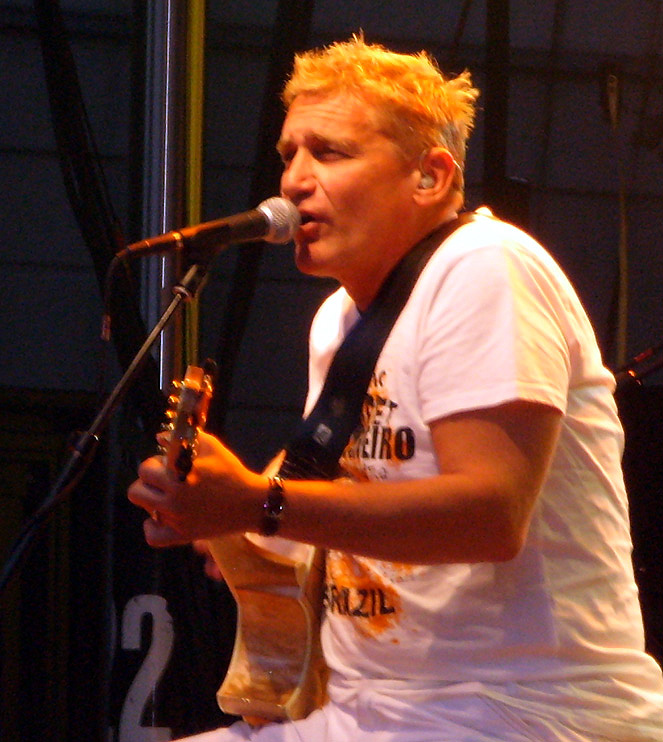
Fendrich performing in 2006

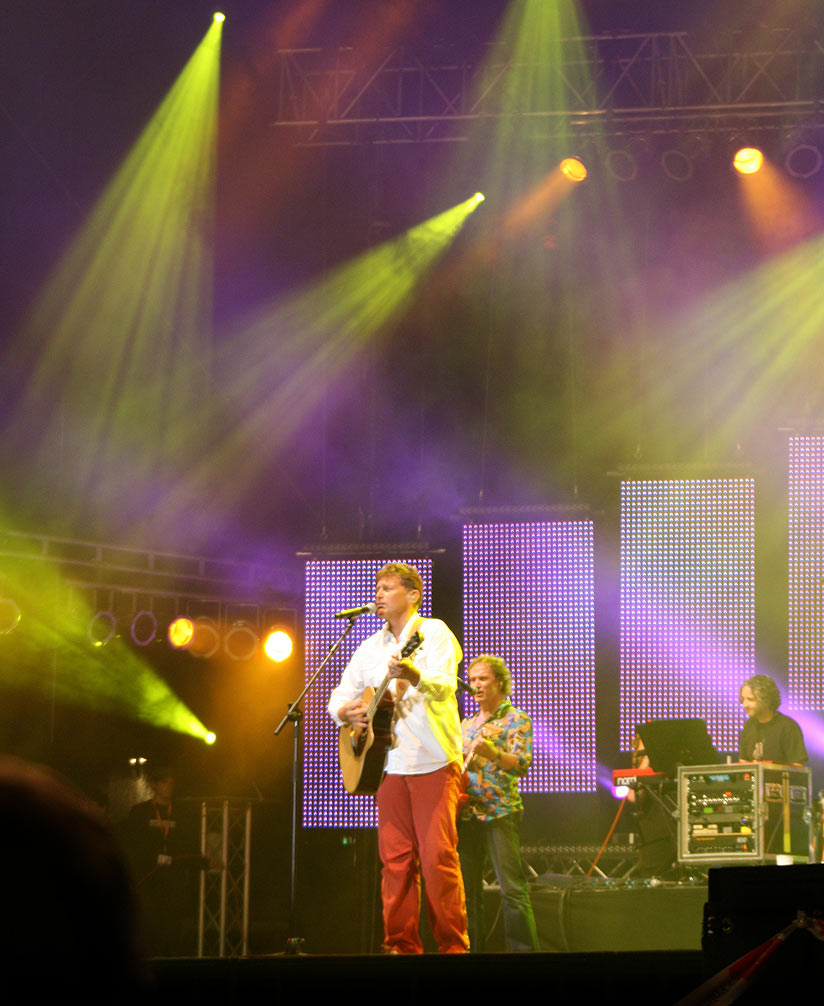
Donauinselfest, Vienna, 2007

In 1997, Fendrich initiated a benefit concert for the homeless, which was intended as a one-off event, at which he performed together with Wolfgang Ambros and Georg Danzer. The overwhelming success led to this team performing as Austria 3 until 2006, creating joint live albums and compilations. The band announced their split on 10 June 2006. Their last concert took place on 24 July 2006 in Altusried, Swabia. On 16 April 2007, the circle of friends reunited at Georg Danzer's comeback concert in the Viennese City Hall to perform three of their old songs; afterwards, several parties planned a possible comeback, but Georg Danzer died of lung cancer on 21 June 2007.

== Other work ==
Fendrich has appeared in numerous Austrian and German movies. In 1997, he played the lead role in Fröhlich geschieden ("Happily divorced") (ZDF) alongside Christina Plate and Helmut Fischer. In 1998, he played Billy Flynn in the musical Chicago at the Theater an der Wien, and in 2002 and 2003 he appeared as Jeff Zodiak in the musical WakeUp, written by him and arranged by Christian Kolonovits and Harold Faltermeyer, with less success at the Raimund Theater.

Fendrich received the Austrian Golden Romy award for most popular presenter in TV entertainment three times. In 1994, 1995 and 2000, he was nominated for the Amadeus Austrian Music Award four times before winning it in 2002. Austrian NEWS magazine readers voted him "Best Entertainer of the Decade" in same year.

As an entertainer, he was the first host of Die Millionenshow, the Austrian version of Who Wants to Be a Millionaire. He also hosted the game show Deal or No Deal in 2005. Both shows aired on ORF. From 2008, he hosted the show Sing and Win! (a variation of the US show Don't Forget the Lyrics!) on the TV station ATV.

== Personal life ==
Fendrich was married to Andrea Sator from 1984 to 2003, with whom he has two sons. Their daughter died of a viral disease in 1989 at the age of 17 months.

When Fendrich was found to have bought cocaine in early April 2006 in the course of police surveillance of a dealer ring, he confessed and claimed to have been using it for 15 years. Immediately afterwards, he went through voluntary withdrawal and has since participated in anti-drug campaigns, but was sentenced to an unconditional fine of €37,500 in May for possession of cocaine and the (later largely abandoned) "passing on of drugs".

On 4 December 2010, Fendrich married his long-time girlfriend Ina Nadine Wagler in Berlin. Their son was born on 10 March 2011. The couple separated in 2012 and divorced in November 2016.

== Discography ==
=== Studio albums ===
Date	Title	Chart positions		
Date	Title	GER	AUT	SWI
1980	Ich wollte nie einer von denen sein	-	16	-
1981	Und alles is ganz anders word'n	-	1	-
1982	Zwischen eins und vier	64	1	-
1983	Auf und davon	-	2	-
1985	Wien bei Nacht	42	1	16
1986	Kein schöner Land	-	3	-
1988	Voller Mond	56	2	-
1989	Von Zeit zu Zeit	-	3	-
1991	Nix is fix	44	1	-
1993	Brüder	64	1	-
1997	Blond	51	1	21
2001	Männersache	30	1	62
2004	aufLeben	43	1	-
2006	hier+jetzt	43	1	-
2010	Meine Zeit	55	1	-
2013	Besser wird's nicht	38	1	56
2016	Schwarzoderweiss	28	1	69
2019	Starkregen	17	1	39
2025	Wimpernschlag	7	1	18

=== Live albums ===
Date	Title	Chart positions		
Date	Title	GER	AUT	SWI
1983	Open Air (with Wolfgang Ambros)	-	4	-
1985	Alle Zeit der Welt – Live	-	9	-
1989	Das Konzert	27	5	21
1992	Wiener Festwochen (with the Vienna Symphony Orchestra)	-	1	-
1998	Schwerelos – Live	-	36	-
2002	Ein Saitensprung	-	6	-
2009	30 Jahre Live – Best Of	-	9	-
2018	Für immer a Wiener – Live und akustisch	57	2	-
2024	Symphonisch in Schönbrunn (with the Salzburg Philharmonic)	23	1	67

=== Compilation albums ===
Date	Title	Chart positions		
Date	Title	GER	AUT	SWI
1983	A winzig klaner Tropfen Zeit	-	-	-
1986	Weus'd a Herz hast	-	8	-
1987	Rainhard Fendrich's Hitparade	-	12	-
1992	Das Beste von Rainhard Fendrich	-	39	-
1993	Strada ... Austria	-	10	-
1994	Lieder mit Gefühl	70	7	-
1995	Recycled	-	2	-
1995	Die größten Hits aus 15 Jahren	-	18	-
1997	Top – 3 (with Wolfgang Ambros and Georg Danzer)	-	22	-
2001	Raritäten (containing rare duets with Reinhard Mey and Marianne Mendt)	-	4	-
2005	So weit, so gut ... Die größten Hits aus 25 Jahren	83	2	-
2006	So ein Theater – Die schönsten Balladen und Liebeslieder	-	51	-
2007	Best Of – Wenn das kein Beweis is ...	-	20	-
2015	Auf den zweiten Blick	-	5	-
2015	Zwischen heute & gestern – Die ultimative Liedersammlung	-	6	-
2015	Zwischen gestern & heute – Die ultimative Liedersammlung	-	7	-

=== Austria 3 ===
- 1998: Austria3 – Live (with Wolfgang Ambros and Georg Danzer)
- 1998: Austria3 – Live Vol. 2 (with Wolfgang Ambros and Georg Danzer)
- 2000: Austria3 – Die Dritte (with Wolfgang Ambros and Georg Danzer)

=== DVDs ===
- 2002: Ein Saitensprung
- 2004: Jetzt

=== Singles ===
Name	Year	Germany	Switzerland	Austria
"Zweierbeziehung"	1981	—	—	16
"Strada del Sole"	1981	24	—	1
"Schickeria"	1982	47	—	1
"Razzia"	1982	—	—	9
"Oben ohne"	1982	24	—	1
"Es lebe der Sport"	1982	54	—	7
"Erobict, sierobict"	1983	—	—	19
"Ich bin ein Negerant, Madam"	1984	—	—	10
"Weus'd a Herz hast wia a Bergwerk"	1984	—	—	3
"Haben Sie Wien schon bei Nacht geseh'n"	1985	—	—	19
"Heimatlied"	1985	—	—	16
"Tränen trocknen schnell"	1987	—	—	15
"Der Wind"	1988	—	—	24
"Macho, Macho"	1988	2	3	1
"Tango Korrupti"	1988	23	13	5
"Von Zeit zu Zeit"	1990	—	—	17
"I Am from Austria"	1990	—	—	6
"Midlife Crises"	1993	59	—	—
"Brüder"	1994	83	—	—
"Blond"	1997	99	—	1
"Little Drummer Boy"	1997	—	—	16
"Entsetzlich hetero"	2001	—	—	47
"Wir sind Europa"	2007	—	—	49

- "Little Drummer Boy" with Eric Minsk, and "Stille Nacht" with Andrew Edge.
