= Es lebe der Sport =

Single by Rainhard Fendrich

Single by Rainhard Fendrich

from the album Zwischen eins und vier
- Released: 1983
- Recorded: 1982
- Genre: Austropop; synthpop; new wave; dance pop; comedy rock; post-disco
- Length: 4:05
- Songwriter: R. Fendrich

Rainhard Fendrich singles chronology
| "Oben ohne" (1982) | "Es lebe der Sport" (00000000) | "Erobict, sierobict" (1983) |

"Es lebe der Sport" is a song recorded in 1982 by Austrian singer Rainhard Fendrich. It reached #7 in the Austrian charts plus #54 in the German Charts. It is a humoristic song about watching, especially bodily harming sports.

== Charts ==
| Chart (1982–83) | Peak position |
|---|---|
| Austria (Ö3 Austria Top 40) | 7 |
| West Germany (GfK) | 54 |
