= Tränen trocknen schnell =

1986 single by Rainhard Fendrich

Single by Rainhard Fendrich

from the album Voller Mond
- Released: 1986
- Recorded: 1986
- Genre: Austropop; folk rock; country rock; roots rock; soft rock; pop rock; acoustic rock; progressive rock
- Length: 4:57
- Songwriter(s): R. Fendrich

Rainhard Fendrich singles chronology
"Vü schöner is des G'fühl" (1985)	"Tränen trocknen schnell" (00000000)	"Der Wind" (1988)

"Tränen trocknen schnell" is a song recorded in 1986 by Austrian singer Rainhard Fendrich.

The single peaked at No. 15 in the Austrian charts on 1 April 1987. It was in the charts for eight weeks in total.
