= Schickeria =

1981 single by Rainhard Fendrich

Single by Rainhard Fendrich

from the album Und alles is ganz anders word'n
- Released: 1982
- Recorded: 1981
- Genre: Austropop; synthpop; reggae fusion
- Length: 3:19
- Songwriter(s): R. Fendrich

Rainhard Fendrich singles chronology
"Strada del Sole" (1981)	"Schickeria" (00000003)	"Razzia" (1982)

"Schickeria" is a song recorded in 1981 by Austrian singer Rainhard Fendrich, included on his album Und alles is ganz anders word'n. The song reached #1 in his home country on January 1, 1982, for one week. It also charted in Germany, reaching No. 47.

Schickeria is an electro pop song with light reggae influences.
