= Thalheim bei Wels =

- Municipality
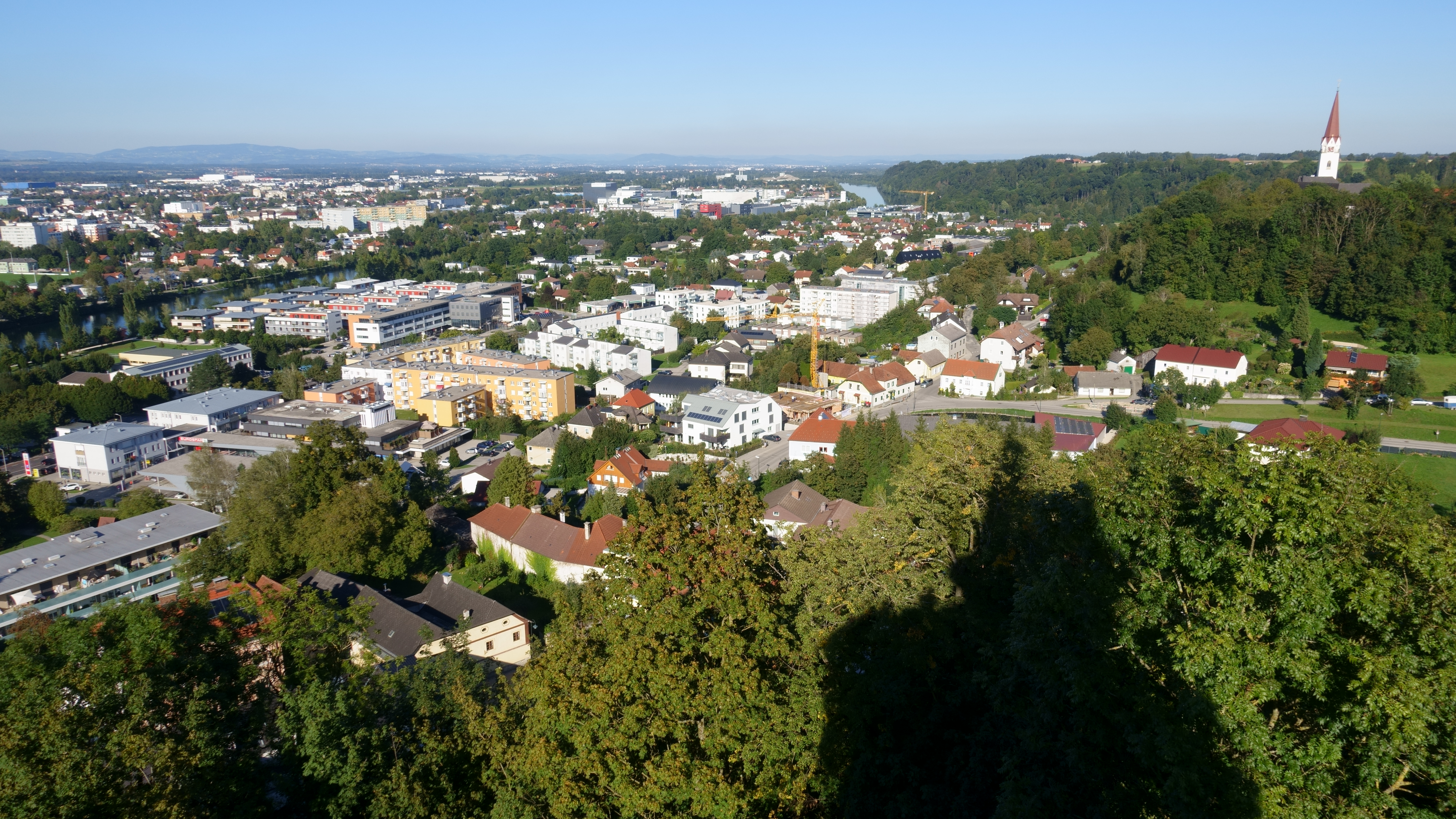

- Coat of arms

- Location within Austria
- Coordinates: 48°09′05″N 14°02′18″E
- Country: Austria
- State: Upper Austria
- District: Wels-Land

Government
  - Mayor: Andreas Stockinger (ÖVP)

Area
  - Total: 16.34 km^{2} (6.31 sq mi)
- Elevation: 369 m (1,211 ft)

Population (2018-01-01)
  - Total: 5,482
  - Density: 335.5/km^{2} (868.9/sq mi)
- Time zone: UTC+1 (CET)
  - Summer (DST): UTC+2 (CEST)
- Postal code: 4600
- Area code: 07242
- Vehicle registration: WL
- Website: www.thalheim.ooe.gv.at

Thalheim bei Wels is a town in the Wels-Land District in the Austrian state of Upper Austria.

== Geography ==
It is situated on the right bank of the river Traun, opposite the city of Wels. About 11.6% of the municipality is forest, 69% is farmland.

== Subdivisions ==
- Bergerndorf
- Edtholz
- Ottstorf
- Schauersberg
- Thalheim bei Wels
- Unterschauersberg

== Population ==
Historical population
Year	Pop.	±%
1991	4,525	—
2001	4,971	+9.9%
2013	5,470	+10.0%

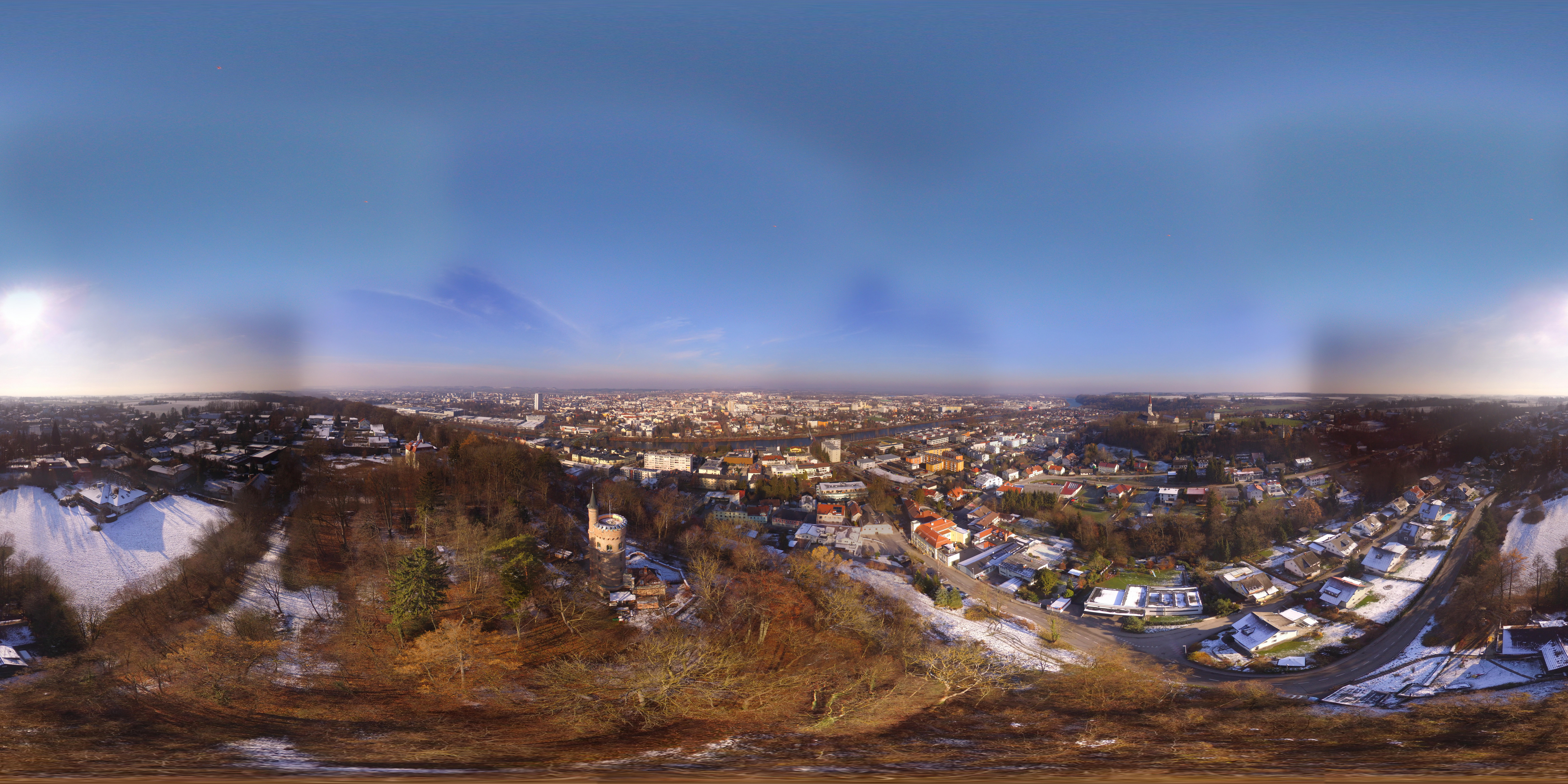
360° airborne panorama, shot near look-out Marienwarte (view as a 360° interactive panorama)

== Sights ==
- Pilgrimage church Maria Schauersberg, consecrated around 1490.
- Marienwarte, a 19th-century observation tower, offers a panorama of the surrounding country. On clear days, the Alps can be seen.

== Archaeology ==
In June 2025, archaeologists from OÖ Landes‑Kultur GmbH and the University of Salzburg uncovered a Roman villa complex on Reinberg Hill in Thalheim bei Wels. The site spans over 1,000 m² and includes three well-preserved mosaic floors dating to the 2nd century CE. The most notable mosaic features an aquatic scene with two dolphins, an exceptionally rare find in Upper Austria. Another mosaic depicts a wine‑mixing vessel (krater), while a third, partially excavated, displays geometric patterns. The villa overlooks the ancient Roman town of Ovilava (modern Wels).

== Personalities ==
- Franz Kalchmair (b. 1939), an opera singer.
