= King Electric =

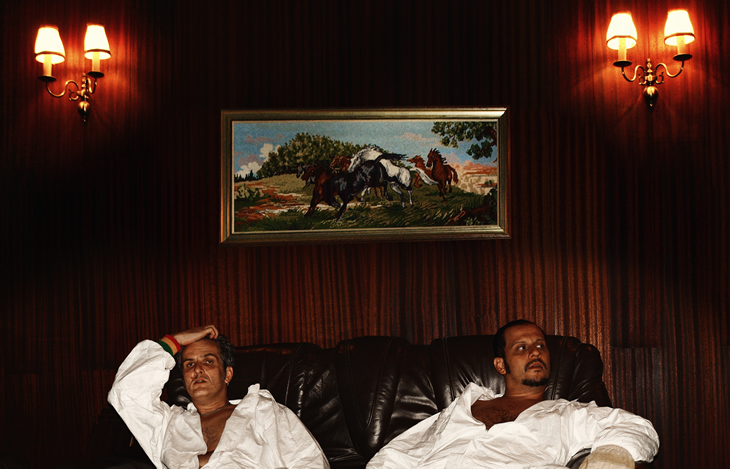

Background information
- Genres: Indie, Alternative, Electronica, experimental
- Occupation: Band
- Years active: 2003 as Sultans of Swing; 2008 as King Electric
- Label: Top10 Records, SONY Music
- Members: Chris Isepp
- Past members: Peter Hartwig(2003–2013); Courtney Jones (2011–2013, †)

King Electric is an electro-pop duo from Austria, founded in 2003 by Chris Isepp and Peter Hartwig.

== Career ==
Emerging from the Viennese indie and techno scene of the early 1990s, Peter Hartwig and Chris Isepp launched their music careers.

In 1993, Chris Isepp ended his music career and, with graphic designer Richard Miklos, founded ENVELOPE Magazine as publisher and editor-in-chief, calling it "trailblazing Graphic Art/Techno Magazine of the Year" [quote: VIVA, 1994]. The magazine achieved cult status and is still considered the first German-language print medium to combine electronic music, graphic design, and multimedia.

In 1997, Peter Hartwig and Manfred "Manni Montana" Schmeczka founded the duo BASK. Following their two releases on major record label Spray Records / BMG Ariola, "Dark Monkey Moods" [1997] and "World Slow Down" [1999] Peter Hartwig became one of the pioneers of the Vienna Downtempo School. The band broke up in 1999.

In mid-2000, after several studio sessions together, Isepp and Hartwig founded the group Sultans of Swing. The first single, "Summerbreeze", was a huge success from UK to Ibiza, it reached #1 in Belgium, Studio Brussel StuBru, Radio Charts, #8 on spanish Radio Channel Flaix FM and was followed by further releases like “The Way You Feel Inside”, which was a huge success in Italy, reaching #1 on Radio Onda Rossa.

They received good reviews in the german and UK music press (DE:BUG, DJ MAG) and were represented in club and radio charts across Europe. Afterwards, the band changed its name – and in 2008 they also decided on a change in musical style.

In 2009, their first King Electric single, "Da King," was released. The song was licensed by Sony Music Austria, and was featured by Sony Music on Radio FM4 Soundselection (#5 in the official Austrian compilation charts). The official music video was presented at several austria film festivals, including Diagonale, the Alpine Short Film Festival Nenzing, and frameout - digital film festival. The song was also featured several times on the German docu-soap "Teenagers become mothers".

In May 2011, King Electric released another single, "Commit Yourself," which was unsuccessful in Europe but surprisingly received airplay on MTV in the US, reaching number 45 on the Billboard Unsigned Charts for one week.

At the end of 2012, their self-titled debut album, King Electric, was released on top10records/HOANZL/Broken Silence Records, with music Interviews & Music reviews in various Magazines (VICE, SKUG Magazine, Soultrain, Musikexpress). In January 2013, their third single, "Out of Reach," finally reached number 9 on the German Trend Charts and Nr 94 on the Official German Top 100 Singles Chart.

In December 2013, their second album, Remixology Vol. 1, was released again on top10records/HOANZL/Broken Silence Records, featuring remixes of various album tracks. Following the release of these two albums and a subsequent European tour in Austria, Germany, Italy and Spain, Hartwig announced his departure from the band after the death of live drummer Courtey Jones.

The new album, The Good, The Bad And The Dead, has been announced for 2026, along with the two singles Tintifax (based on Greta Thunberg's famous hate speech at the 2019 UN Climate Summit with the phrase "How dare you?") and It Doesn't Matter 3 (co-written and composed by Martin L. Gore & Chris Isepp). Guest stars such as Blowfly, Daphne Oram and MF Doom are announced for the album.

== Discography ==
=== Albums ===
- 2012: King Electric
- 2013: Remixology Vol 1
- 2026: The Good, The Bad And The Dead

=== Singles ===
- 2003: Summerbreeze (as Sultans of Swing)
- 2004: (Make) A Little Love (as Sultans of Swing)
- 2005: The Way You Feel Inside (as Sultans of Swing)
- 2009: Da King
- 2011: Commit Yourself
- 2012: Out Of Reach peaked at #94 on the German Singles Chart
- 2026: Tintifax

=== Remixes ===
- 2024: Michael Jackson VS King Electric - The Thriller // Nightmare

== See also ==
- List of Austrians in music
