= Colors of a New Dawn =

Studio album by Gandalf
- Released: 2004
- Genre: New age
- Label: Real Music

Gandalf chronology
Between Earth and Sky (2003)	Colors of a New Dawn (2004)	Der Prophet (2005)

Colors of a New Dawn is the 24th studio album released by Austrian new age musician Gandalf.

== Track listing ==
1. Rhythm of the Tides – 6:18
2. Bridge of Confidence – 5:29
3. In the Presence of Angels – 4:54
4. Iris – 9:05
5. From Distant Shores – 7:17
6. In the Presence of Angels (Reprise) – 1:41
7. Hearts in Celestial Unison – 4:56
8. Flowers Along My Way – 2:53
9. Colors of a New Dawn – 6:32
10. Brighter Than a Star – 7:12

== Personnel ==
- Gandalf – acoustic 12-string guitar, classical nylon guitar, electric guitars, bouzuki, saz, piano, Mellotron, keyboards, samplers, percussion
- Julia Martins – vocals on "In the Presence of Angels"
