= Rudolf Fitzner =

Austrian violinist and music teacher (1868–1934)

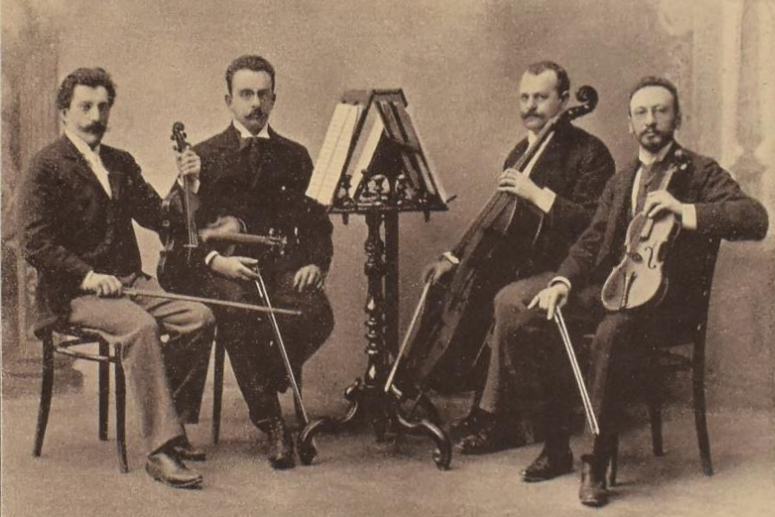
Fitzner Quartet

Rudolf Fitzner ( May 4, 1868 – February 2, 1934) was an Austrian violinist and music teacher.

He was born in Ernstbrunn in 1868. He studied at the Vienna Conservatory. Among his teachers were Anton Bruckner and Jakob Moritz Grün (violin).

In 1894 he established the Fitzner Quartet.

He briefly was chamber musician of the King of Bulgaria starting in 1911, but he soon returned to Austria. He died in Maxglan (present day in Salzburg).

== See also ==
- List of Austrians in music
