= Gandalf (musician) =

Austrian composer

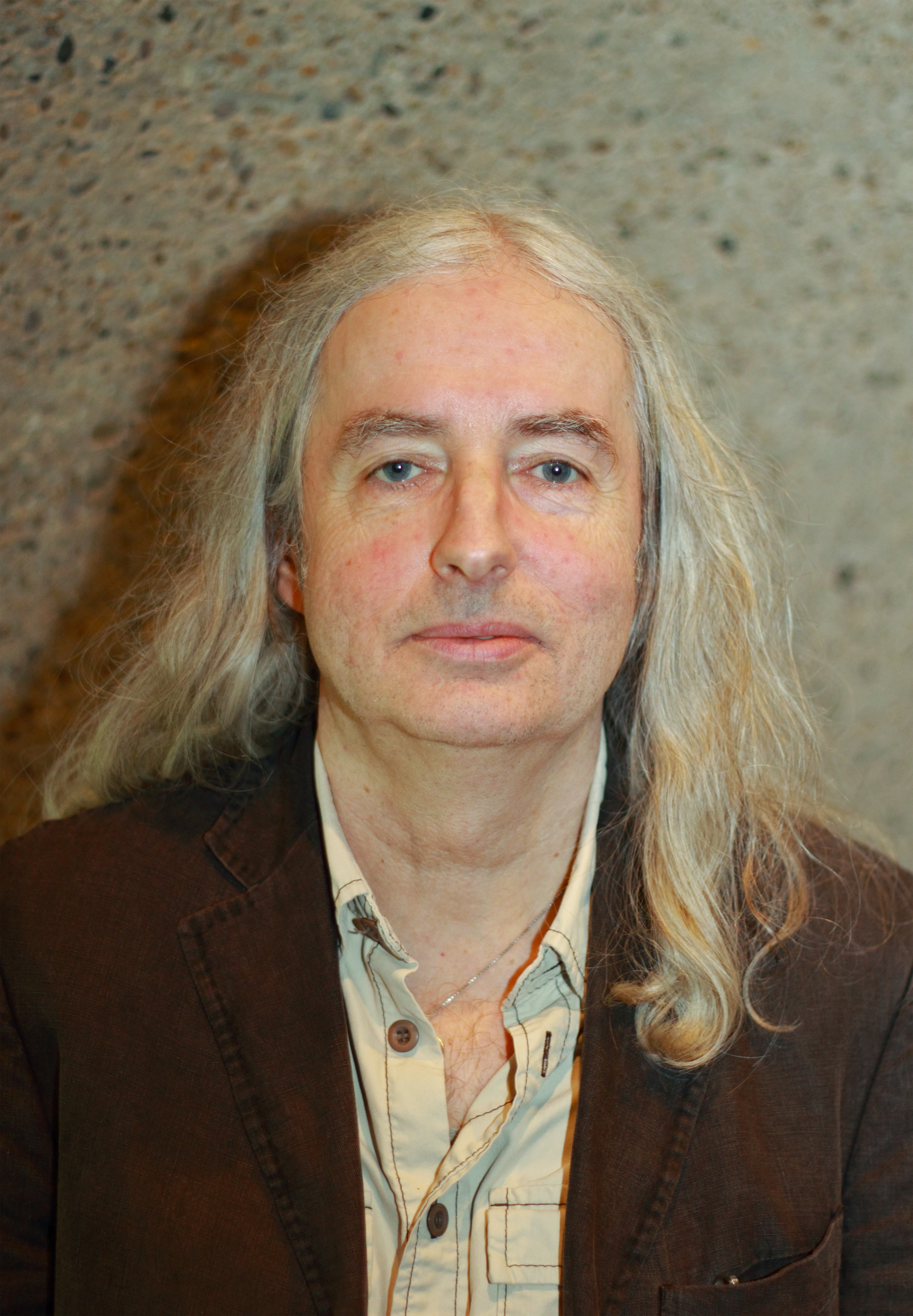
- Gandalf in 2012

Background information
- Born: Heinz Strobl; 4 December 1952 (age 72); Pressbaum, Vienna, Austria
- Genres: New-age
- Years active: 1981–present
- Website: www.gandalf.at

Gandalf (born Heinz Strobl, born 1952) is an Austrian New Age composer. He plays a wide variety of instruments, including guitar, keyboard, synthesizers and sitars. He includes electronic sounds in his music.

He released his first album Journey to an Imaginary Land on 17 March 1981, and his second, Visions, almost one year later on 16 March 1982. He has become one of Austria's most accomplished international musicians.

== Discography ==
=== Studio albums ===
- 1981 - Journey to an Imaginary Land
- 1982 - Visions
- 1983 - To Another Horizon
- 1983 - More Than Just a Seagull
- 1984 - Magic Theatre
- 1985 - Tale from a Long Forgotten Kingdom
- 1987 - The Universal Play
- 1987 - Fantasia
- 1987 - From Source to Sea
- 1989 - Invisible Power
- 1990 - Labyrinth (Soundtrack)
- 1990 - Symphonic Landscapes
- 1992 - Gallery of Dreams (feat. Steve Hackett)
- 1992 - The Stones of Wisdom
- 1994 - To Our Children's Children
- 1994 - Colours of the Earth
- 1995 - Echoes from Ancient Dreams
- 1996 - The Shining (with Galadriel)
- 1996 - Gates to Secret Realities
- 1997 - Barakaya: Trees Water Life
- 1999 - Into the Light
- 1999 - Samsara
- 2000 - Visions 2001 (CD1: inspired by Tolkien, Lord of the Rings. CD2: a compilation "20 Years Gandalf: Rare & Precious Pieces")
- 2002 - The Fountain of Secrets
- 2003 - Between Earth and Sky
- 2004 - Colors of a New Dawn
- 2005 - Der Prophet
- 2006 - Sacred River
- 2007 - Lotus Land
- 2009 - Sanctuary
- 2011 - Earthsong and Stardance
- 2013 - Dreamweaver
- 2014 - The Prophet - Instrumental Edition (Music inspired by Kahlil Gibran)
- 2014 - Frame By Frame
- 2016 - All is One - One is All
- 2020 - Secret Sarai
- 2023 - Eartheana
- 2024 - A Light From Afar

=== Compilations ===
- 1987 - Fantasia: Best of Gandalf
- 1991 - Reflection (Masterworks 1986-1990)
- 1995 - Magical Voyage
- 1997 - Under Infinite Skies
- 2000 - Reiki: Healing Light
- 2001 - Visions: 2001 (CD1: inspired by Tolkien, Lord of the Rings. CD2: compilation, "20 Years Gandalf: Rare & Precious Pieces")

=== Live albums ===
- 2008 - Live in Vienna
- 2018 - 35 Years Live

== See also ==
- List of Austrians in music
