= Macho Macho =

Single by Rainhard Fendrich

from the album Voller Mond
- Released: 1988
- Recorded: 1988
- Genre: New wave; reggae
- Length: 4:07
- Songwriter(s): R. Fendrich

Rainhard Fendrich singles chronology
"Der Wind" (1988)	"Macho Macho" (0000000)	"Tango Korrupti" (1988)

"Macho Macho" is a song recorded in 1988 by Austrian singer Rainhard Fendrich. It was Fendrich's most successful song. It did not only reach the top of the Austrian charts, but also #2 in Germany and #3 in Switzerland. The song is 4 minutes and 14 seconds long.
