= Wolfgang Dimetrik =

Wolfgang Dimetrik (born 6 January 1974) is an Austrian accordionist.

At the age of six he received his first accordion lessons. Five years later he became a pupil of Prof Erwin Moder at the Johann-Joseph-Fux Conservatory in Graz. Having completed his accordion studies at the Graz School of Music (since 1992) as a disciple of the visiting professors Mogens Ellegaard, James Crabb, and Geir Draugsvoll, he received a grant to continue his studies in the class of Prof Stefan Hussong at the Hermann-Zilcher-Conservatory in Würzburg, where he finished his studies with commendation in 2001 before entering the master class of the Würzburg School of Music. 2003 master-class-examination.

Wolfgang Dimetrik joins on stage various chamber ensembles in Europe, such as the musikfabrik Nordrhein-Westfalen, Neues Ensemble Hannover, ensemble recherche, Ensemble SurPlus and the Ensemble Modern.

In addition, he participated in several contemporary opera productions, including The Walls (Die Wände) by Adriana Hölszky, conducted by Alfons Kontarsky (Frankfurt); and the first performance of Arnold Schoenberg's The Lucky Hand (Die glückliche Hand, in an arrangement for chamber orchestra) by the United Ensemble Berlin, conducted by Peter Hirsch.

== Discography ==
- 2001 Johann Sebastian Bach, Goldberg Variations
- 2003 Joseph Haydn, Sonatas

== See also ==
- List of Austrians in music
