= Hermann Szobel =

Austrian pianist and composer (born 1958)

- Born: 1958 (age 67–68); Vienna, Austria
- Mother: Sonja Grajonca
- Relatives: Bill Graham (uncle)

Hermann Szobel (born 1958) is an Austrian former pianist and composer. He produced and recorded a single jazz fusion album, Szobel (1976), at the age of 18, demonstrating, in the words of a DownBeat reviewer (9 September 1976), "a conception and technique far in advance of most musicians twice his age."

== Biography ==
Szobel was born in 1958 in Vienna, Austria to mother Sonja (née Grajonca) Szobel. Szobel is the nephew of promoter Bill Graham.

Szobel was "a child prodigy who began his classical training at the age of six" who "spent the majority of his practicing hours on pieces by Chopin." Pianists Martial Solal and Keith Jarrett were two major influences on his work. The album "Szobel" features extremely complicated compositions comparable to those of Frank Zappa. The music is jazz-based but contains elements of rock and Western classical music. Szobel's impressive piano virtuosity is noticeable throughout the album. The other musicians on "Szobel" are Michael Visceglia on bass, Bob Goldman on drums, Dave Samuels on percussion including marimba and vibraphone, and Vadim Vyadro on tenor sax, clarinet, and flute.

Obscure even when it was released (on Arista Records) in 1976, the album "Szobel" was issued on CD by Laser's Edge in 2012.

Hermann Szobel disappeared from the music world after this album. His mother had filed a missing persons report in 2002. It is thought he was living in Jerusalem, and then later in San Francisco.

Katarzyna Kozyra, the Polish artist and filmmaker, met Szobel in Jerusalem while working on her project called "Looking for Jesus" (Polish: Szukając Jezusa), a film about people with a condition known as Jerusalem Syndrome. Szobel agreed to record the conversation, but you cannot see his face in Kozyra's movie. He was living like a homeless man, eating what he could find in the streets, but still being an artist.

== See also ==
- List of Austrians in music
