= Amy Beth Kirsten =

American composer (born 1972)

Amy Beth Kirsten (born 1972) is an American composer. She has worked with musical groups and ensembles including the Chicago Symphony Orchestra, American Composers Orchestra, and eighth blackbird, and is one of the co-founders of HOWL ensemble.

== Life and career ==
Kirsten began writing songs and choral pieces while learning the piano as a child. She was a vocal and piano major at Benedictine University but only began formal composition training at the age of 30. She received her Doctor of Musical Arts at the Peabody Institute and Master of Music at Roosevelt University.

Kirsten is most notable for her works for “Composed Theatre”, which is referred by Matthias Rebstock as “the creative process and the performance of pieces that are determined by compositional strategies and, in a broader sense, by compositional thinking.” Her major theatrical works include Savior (2016-2018) and QUIXOTE (2015-2017), and Colombine's Paradise Theatre (2010-2013). Her notable instrumental compositions include Pirouette On a Moon Sliver (2011) for flute solo and Drink Me (2010) for chamber orchestra, both with elements of vocalization.

Kirsten currently serves on the composition faculty at The Juilliard School and Curtis Institute. She previously served on the faculty of the Peabody Institute of Johns Hopkins University from 2015 to 2017. She has also been the faculty and advisory board of the annual highSCORE festival in Pavia, Italy since 2011.
