= Mýto =

Town in the Czech Republic

- Town
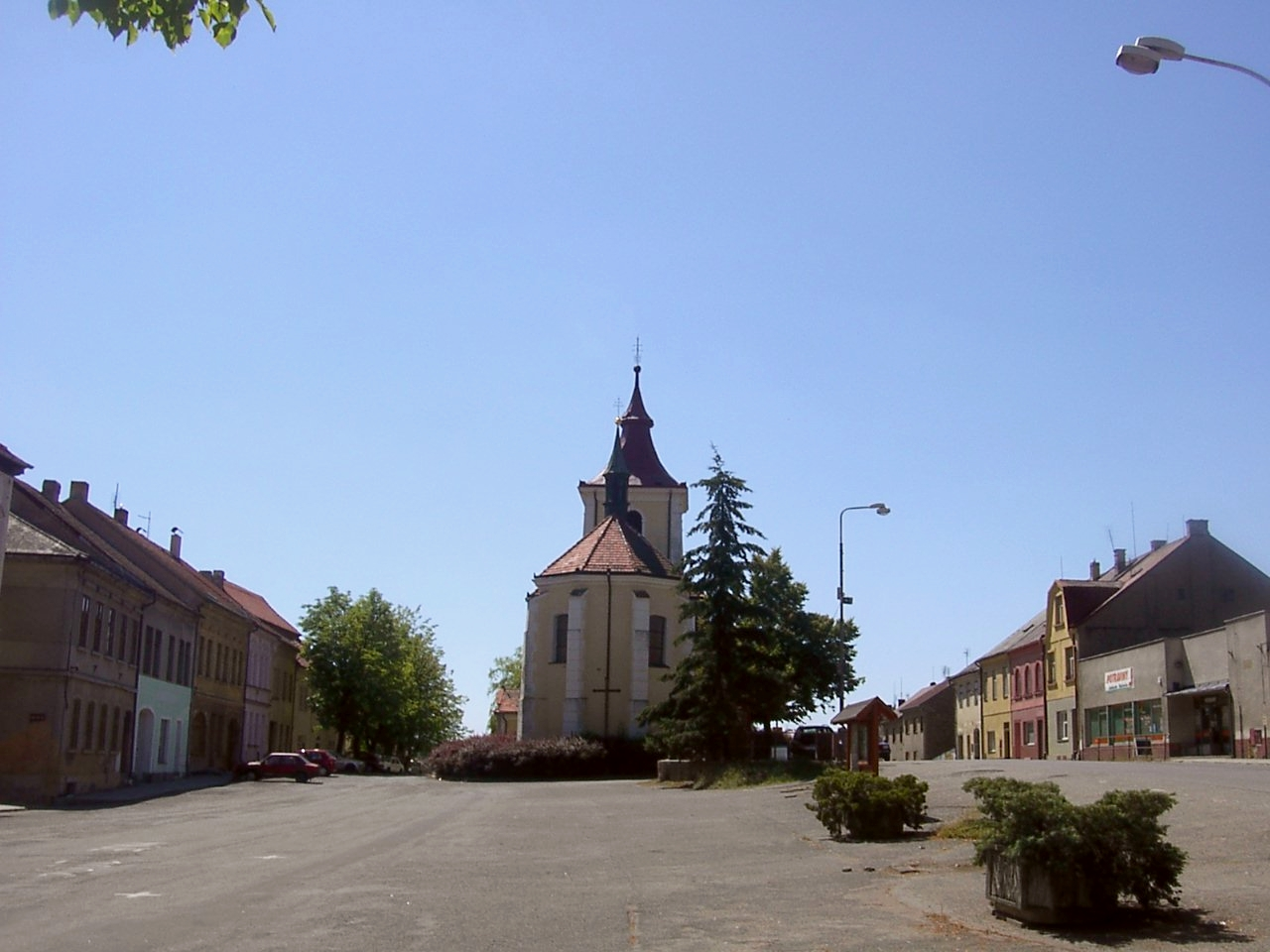
- Town square

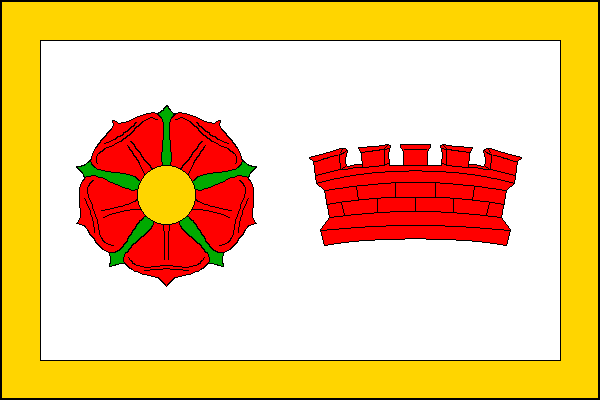
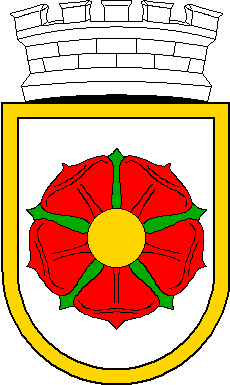
- Flag Coat of arms

- Location in the Czech Republic
- Coordinates: 49°47′21″N 13°44′5″E
- Country: Czech Republic
- Region: Plzeň
- District: Rokycany
- First mentioned: 1296

Government
  - Mayor: František Končel

Area
  - Total: 17.80 km^{2} (6.87 sq mi)
- Elevation: 443 m (1,453 ft)

Population (2026-01-01)
  - Total: 1,640
  - Density: 92.1/km^{2} (239/sq mi)
- Time zone: UTC+1 (CET)
  - Summer (DST): UTC+2 (CEST)
- Postal code: 338 05
- Website: www.mestomyto.cz

Mýto (Czech pronunciation: [ˈmiːto]; German: Mauth) is a town in Rokycany District in the Plzeň Region of the Czech Republic. It has about 1,600 inhabitants.

== Etymology ==
The town's name literally means 'toll'. It refers to its history and location on an important trade route from Prague to Bavaria where the toll was collected.

== Geography ==
Mýto is located about 11 kilometres (7 mi) northeast of Rokycany and 24 km (15 mi) east of Plzeň. The municipal territory extends into three geomorphological regions. The central part with the built-up area lies in the western tip of the Hořovice Uplands. The southern part lies in the Brdy Highlands and includes the highest point of Mýto, the hill Ostrý vrch at 641 m (2,103 ft) above sea level. A small part in the north lies in the Křivokrát Highlands.

The stream Holoubkovský potok flows through the town. The streams supplies two notable fishponds in the municipal territory: Štěpánský rybník and Podmýtský rybník.

== History ==
The first written mention of Mýto and its older church is from 1296. The original settlement was located on a hill around the Church of Saint Stephen. Gradually people began to settle in the area of today's Mýto, where the Church of Saint John the Baptist was built in 1350. At the beginning of the 14th century Mýto became a market town, and in 1905 it became a town.

== Demographics ==
Historical population

Year	Pop.	±%
1869	2,114	—
1880	2,102	−0.6%
1890	2,159	+2.7%
1900	2,287	+5.9%
1910	2,296	+0.4%

Year	Pop.	±%
1921	2,191	−4.6%
1930	2,217	+1.2%
1950	1,676	−24.4%
1961	1,823	+8.8%
1970	1,640	−10.0%

Year	Pop.	±%
1980	1,497	−8.7%
1991	1,382	−7.7%
2001	1,403	+1.5%
2011	1,506	+7.3%
2021	1,536	+2.0%

Source: Censuses

== Transport ==
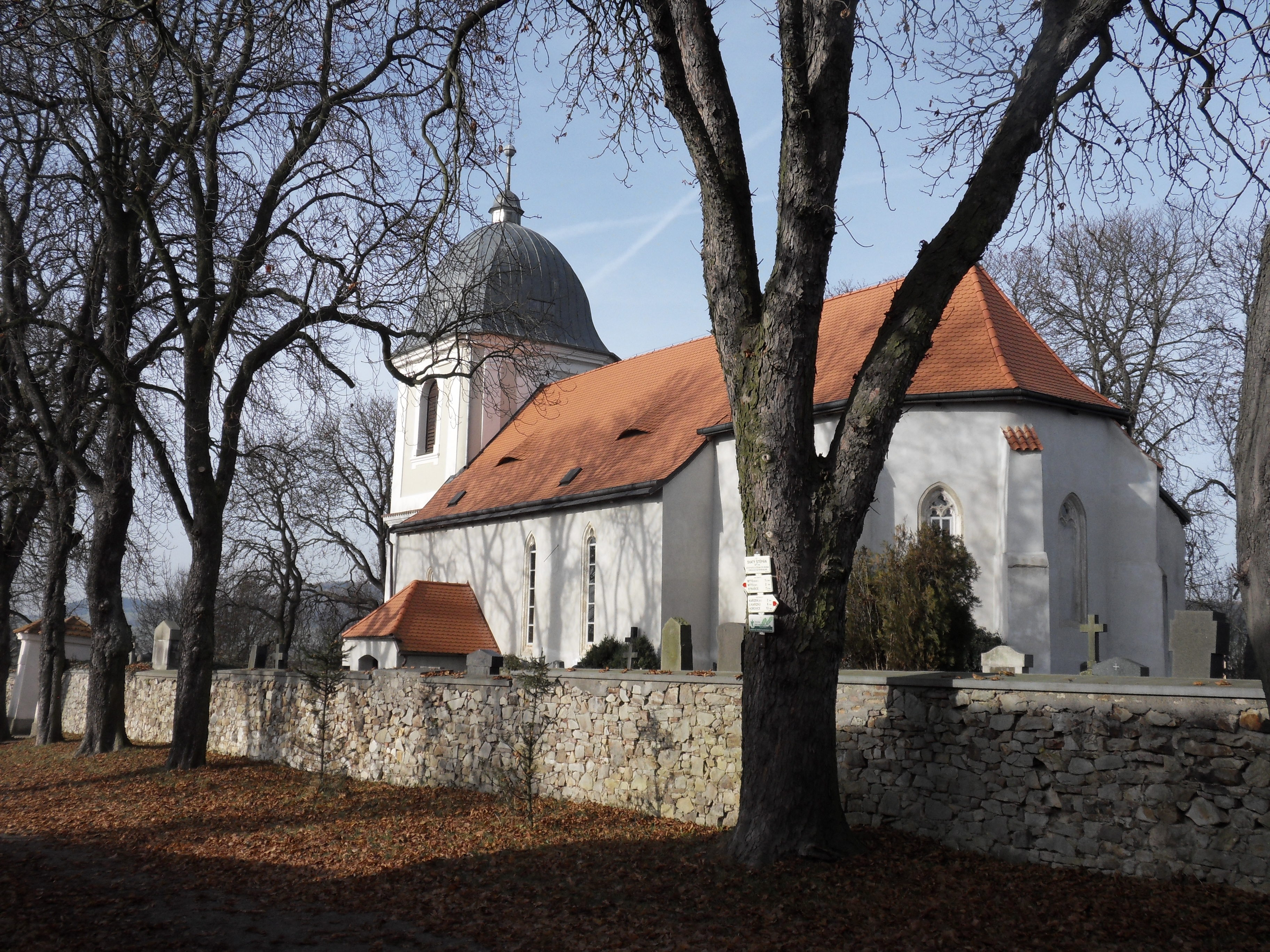
Church of Saint Stephen

The D5 motorway from Prague to Plzeň runs through the northern part of the municipal territory.

Mýto is located on the railway line Plzeň–Beroun.

== Sights ==
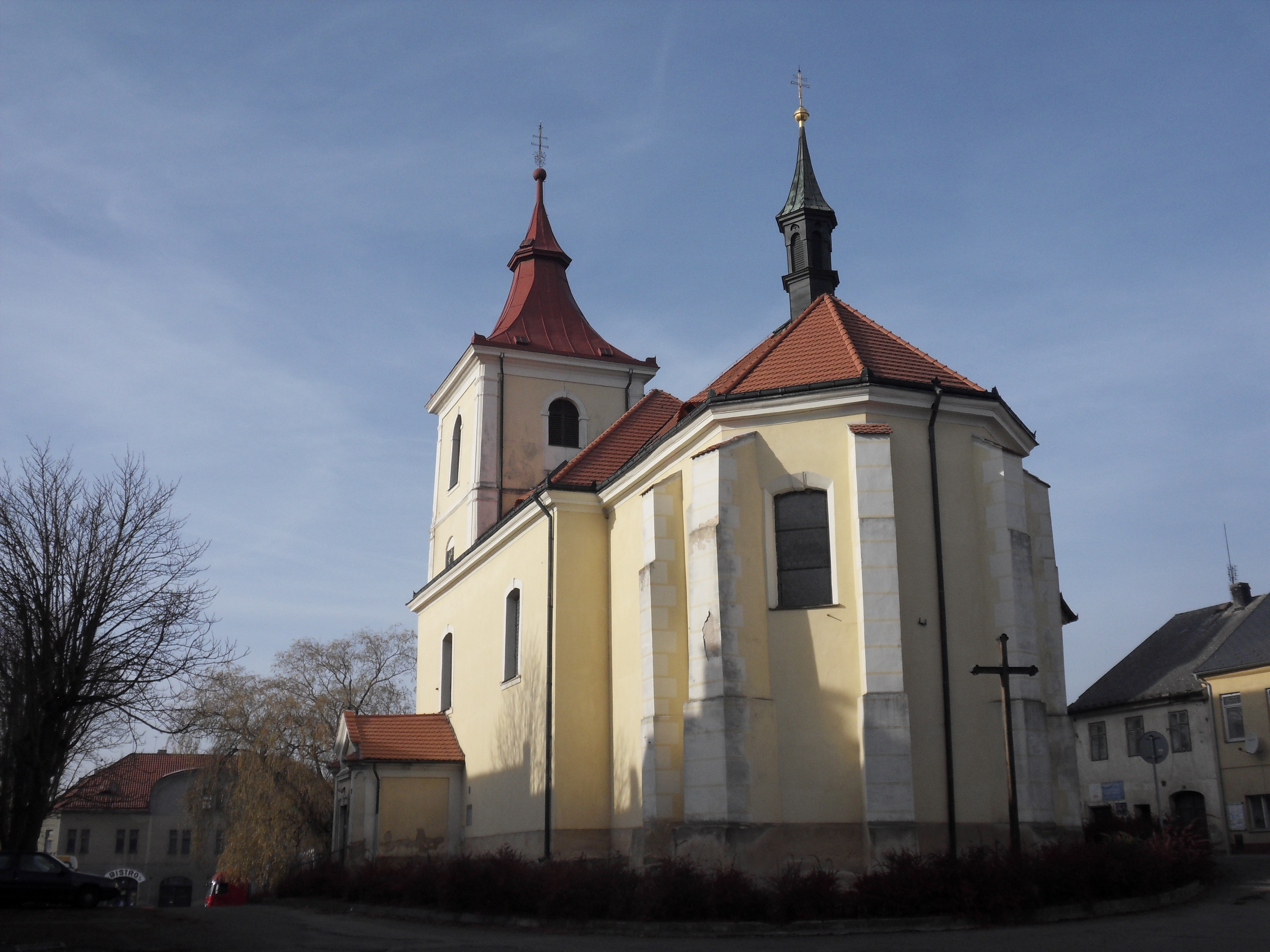
Church of Saint John the Baptist

The Gothic Church of Saint Stephen was built in the 13th century and its Baroque tower dates from the 18th century. Today it serves social and cultural purposes.

The Church of Saint John the Baptist was originally a chapel consecrated to John the Evangelist. During the Thirty Years' War the church was burned down, and in 1680–1682 it was built once again. Many of its Gothic elements were rebuilt in the Baroque style.

== Notable people ==
- August Wilhelm Ambros (1816–1876), Austrian music historian

== Twin towns – sister cities ==
Mýto is twinned with:

- Berga, Germany
