= Timna Brauer =

Austrian-Israeli singer-songwriter

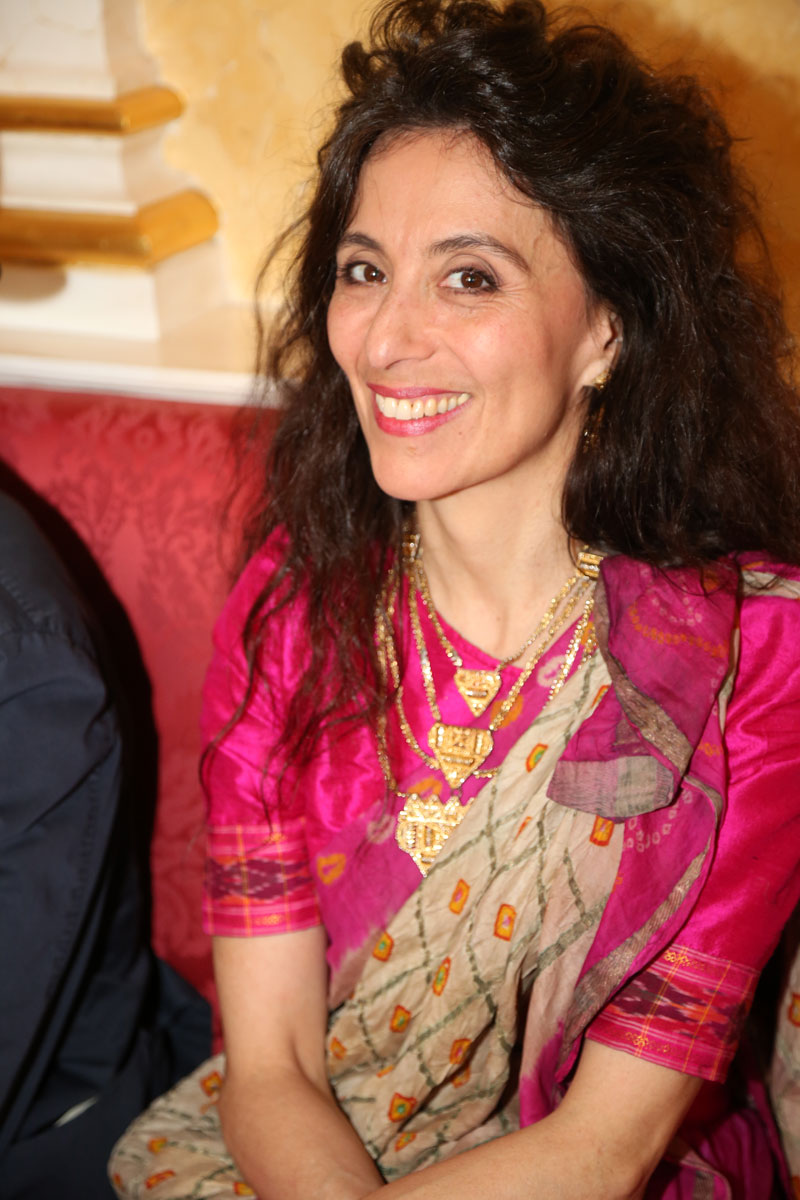
Timna Brauer in 2013

Timna Brauer (Hebrew: תימנה בראואר; born 1 May 1961) is an Austrian-Israeli singer-songwriter who represented Austria at the Eurovision Song Contest 1986.

== Career ==
She represented Austria at the Eurovision Song Contest 1986, singing "Die Zeit ist einsam" (English: Time is Lonely).

Brauer participated in the third season of the Austrian television dance competition Dancing Stars in 2007, coming in tenth place.

== Personal life ==
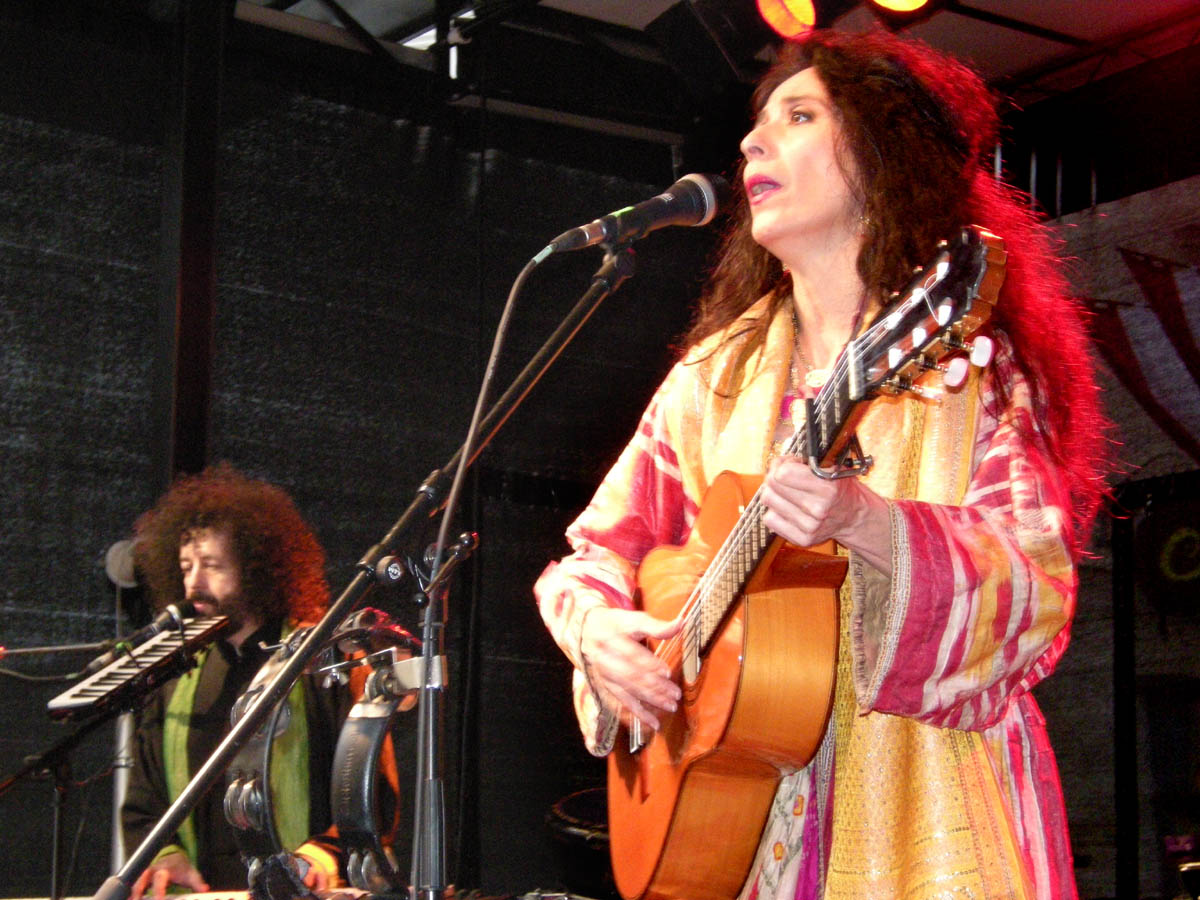
Timna Brauer and Elias Meiri, Vienna, 2008

Born in Vienna, Brauer is the daughter of Arik Brauer and his Israeli-born wife Naomi Dahabani.

She collaborates with the Israeli pianist Elias Meiri. They are the parents of daughter Jasmin and son Jonathan.

== Selected discography ==
- 1987: Orient (Timna Brauer & Elias Meiri Ensemble)
- 1992: Mozart "Anders" (Timna Brauer & Elias Meiri Ensemble)
- 1996: Tefila-Prayer / Jewish Spirituals (Timna Brauer)
- 1997: Chansons et violons (Timna Brauer & Elias Meiri)
- 1999: Die Brauers (The Brauer family - 3 generations)
- 2001: Songs from Evita (Timna Brauer)
- 2001: Voices for Peace (Timna Brauer & various choirs)
- 2005: Kinderlieder aus Europa: CD + Informational booklet (Timna Brauer & Elias Meiri Ensemble + Children)
- 2006: Der kleine Mozart: Listen and Play CD for Children (Timna Brauer & Elias Meiri Ensemble)

== Bibliography ==
- Timna Brauer & Birgit Antoni, Wir singen in vielen Sprachen. Annette Betz, Vienna, 2005. ISBN 3-219-11211-0
- Timna Brauer & Elias Meiri, World Music Israel. Theodore Presser, King of Prussia, no date. ISBN B00008H6H4

Preceded by Gary Lux	Austria in the Eurovision Song Contest; 1986	Succeeded by Gary Lux
