= Anita (singer) =

Austrian singer (born 1960)

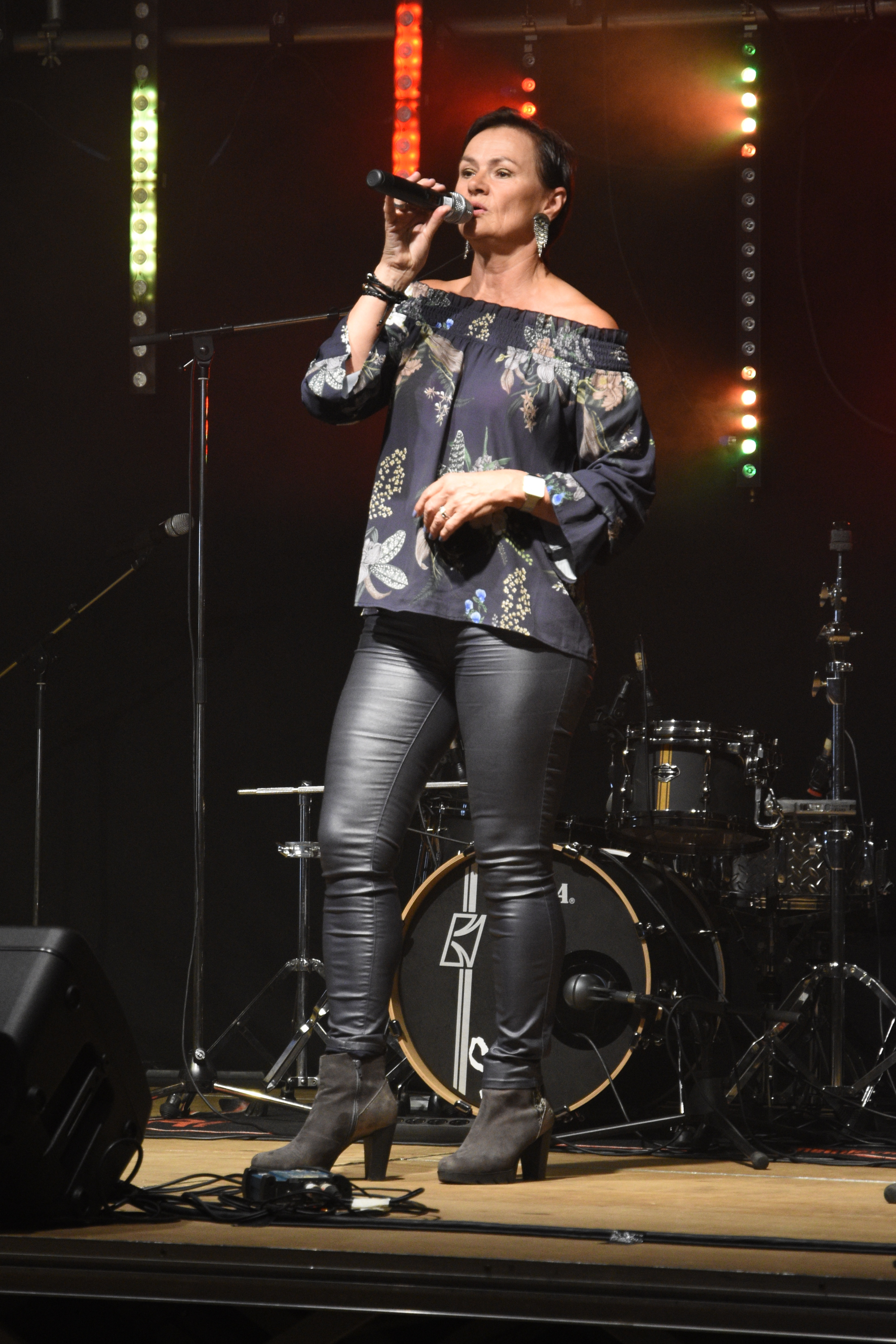
- Anita in 2022

Background information
- Birth name: Anita Spanner
- Born: 22 December 1960 (age 64)
- Origin: Fürstenfeld District, Austria
- Genres: Pop
- Occupation: Singer

Anita Spanner (born 22 December 1960), known mononymously as Anita, is an Austrian singer, best known for her participation in the 1984 Eurovision Song Contest.

== Career ==
=== Eurovision Song Contest ===
Anita came to the Austrian Eurovision selection in 1984 as a virtual unknown, but her song "Einfach weg" ("Simply Gone") was the clear winner of the 12 entrants, sending her to the 29th Eurovision Song Contest, held in Luxembourg City on 5 May. In Luxembourg however, "Einfach weg" (with Gary Lux among the backing vocalists) met an ignominious fate, finishing in last place of the 19 entries garnering only five points, well below the 26 points of the next-lowest ranked song from Yugoslavia.

Nevertheless, "Einfach weg" proved to be a domestic hit in Austria, topping the chart for two weeks.

=== Later career ===
Anita released further singles but could not repeat the success of "Einfach weg" in the home market. In 1991, she again took part in the Austrian Eurovision selection, but "Land in Sicht" ("Land in Sight") could only finish seventh of the 10 songs.

In the mid-1990s Anita withdrew from the public eye to raise a family. She has recently returned to performing as a member of a seven-piece live band called Hit4You.

Preceded by Westend	Austria in the Eurovision Song Contest; 1984	Succeeded by Gary Lux
