= Franz Kalchmair =

Austrian opera singer (1939–2020)

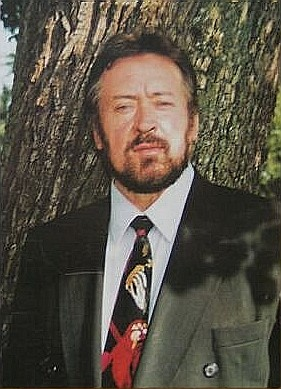
Franz Kalchmair

Franz Kalchmair (22 December 1939 – February 2020) was an Austrian operatic bass and interpreter of Bach cantatas along with other sacred or clerical music. As an opera singer, he is known for portraying such humorous roles as the pig farmer in Johann Strauss' The Gypsy Baron.

Franz Kalchmair was raised in Thalheim bei Wels, the son of a farmer. When he was 10 years old, he was admitted to the St. Florian Boys Choir and trained there to sing professionally.

He further developed his bass voice at the Bruckner-Konservatorium in Linz. His first engagements were at the Landestheater Sankt Pölten and the Sommerbühne Baden/Vienna. Although his singing career was interrupted when he was called back to Thalheim bei Wels to manage the family farm, his love of music guided him back to the stage years later.

He was a member of the Landestheater Linz Ensemble for over 20 years, and was a guest singer at the Vienna Volksoper under the lead of Fritz Muliar and at the Opera Graz. His many other engagements included Seespiele Mörbisch under the lead of Helmuth Lohner, Landestheater Salzburg, Sommerbühne Baden/Vienna, St. Pölten Landestheater, Summer theatre Steyr, and tours through Germany and Denmark.

His repertoire includes such lead bass roles as the title role in Falstaff, Kezal (The Bartered Bride), Osmin (Die Entführung aus dem Serail), Sarastro (The Magic Flute), Prince Gremin (Eugene Onegin), and Baron Ochs (Der Rosenkavalier).

He was awarded the cultural gold medal for long term activities in Wels and the ring of honor in his home town of Thalheim bei Wels.

== See also ==
- List of Austrians in music
