= Karoline Bayer =

Austrian artist (1758–1803)

Karoline Bayer (1758–1803) was a celebrated 18th-century violinist. Born in Vienna, she was the daughter of a trumpeter in the imperial court. She also composed music, but her works have not survived. She performed successfully on the stages of Berlin and Hamburg in 1773 and in Lübeck in 1776. She was invited to play at the court of Frederick the Great. The king, who played the flute, accompanied her. She died in Vienna in 1803.
