= Otto Kade =

German musicologist and composer

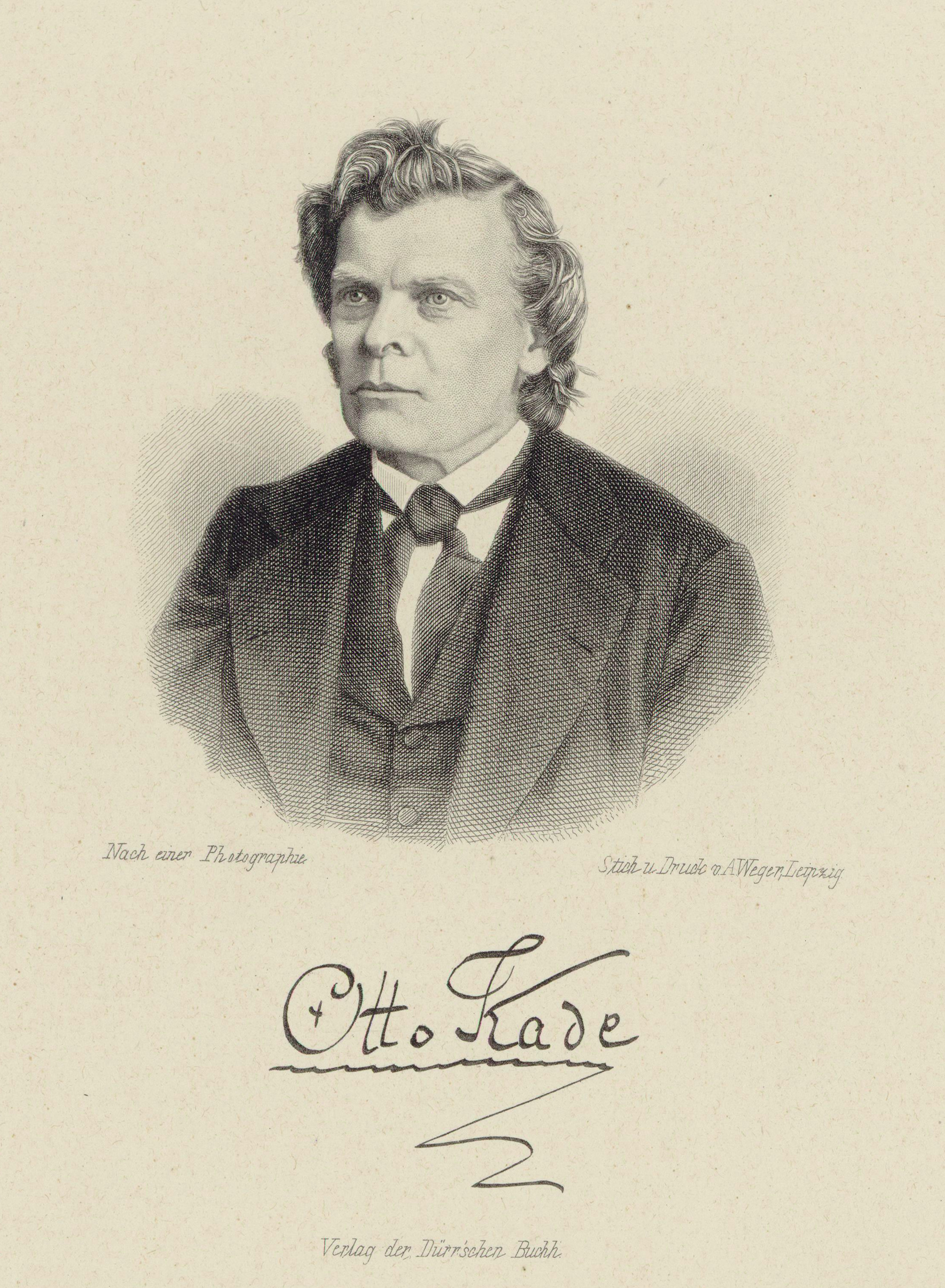
Otto Kade, steel engraving from August Weger

Otto Kade (6 May 1819 – 19 July 1900) was a German musicologist, organist, conductor and composer.

== Life and career ==
Kade was born in Dresden. After graduating from the Kreuzschule, Kade studied harmony and counterpoint with the Kreuzkantor Ernst Julius Otto and Moritz Hauptmann in Dresden. A scholarship of the Saxon king Frederick Augustus II of Saxony enabled him to study further piano and organ with Johann Gottlob Schneider junior. With the support of his uncle, the coin engraver Reinhard Krüger, he could make a one-and-a-half year journey to Italy, on which he researched in music archives and among other things tracked down a mass by Giovanni Pierluigi da Palestrina in a monastery library and brought it into a score.

In 1869 he was a co-founder and then a long-time author of the Monatshefte für Musik-Geschichte.

Kade died in Doberan at age 81.

== Publications ==
- Cantionale für die evangelisch-lutherischen Kirchen des Großherzogtums Mecklenburg-Schwerin. 4 volumes, 1868–1887.
- Vierstimmiges Choralbuch für Kirche, Schule und Haus zu dem auf Grossherzoglichen Befehl 1867 erschienenen Melodieenbuche zu dem Mecklenburgischen Kirchengesangbuche. 1869.
- Der neuaufgefundene Luther-Codex vom Jahre 1530. 1871.
- Die fünfundzwanzigjährige Wirksamkeit des grossherzoglichen Schlosschores in Schwerin. Eine Festschrift. Schwerin: Sandmeyer 1880
- (editor) August Wilhelm Ambros: Geschichte der Musik. 5 volume, 1880–1882
- Die Musikalien-Sammlung des Großherzoglich Mecklenburg-Schwerinschen Fürstenhauses in den letzten zwei Jahrhunderten. 2 volumes, 1893.

Digitalisat von Band I on Internet Archive
Digitalisat von Band II on Internet Archive

- [addendum] Der musikalische Nachlaß weiland Ihrer Königlichen Hoheit der verwitweten Frau Erbgrossherzogin Landgravine Auguste of Hesse-Homburg. Wismar, Schwerin 1899 [repr. Hildesheim, New York 1974]
- Die alteren Musikalien der Stadt Freiberg in Sachsen. Edited by von Reinhard Kade. Leipzig: Breitkopf & Härtel 1888 (Beilage zu den Monatsheften für Musik-Geschichte).
- Die ältere Passionskomposition bis zum Jahre 1631. Gütersloh 1893.
