= Jewish Transmigration Bureau =

JDC agency facilitating Jewish emigration during WWII

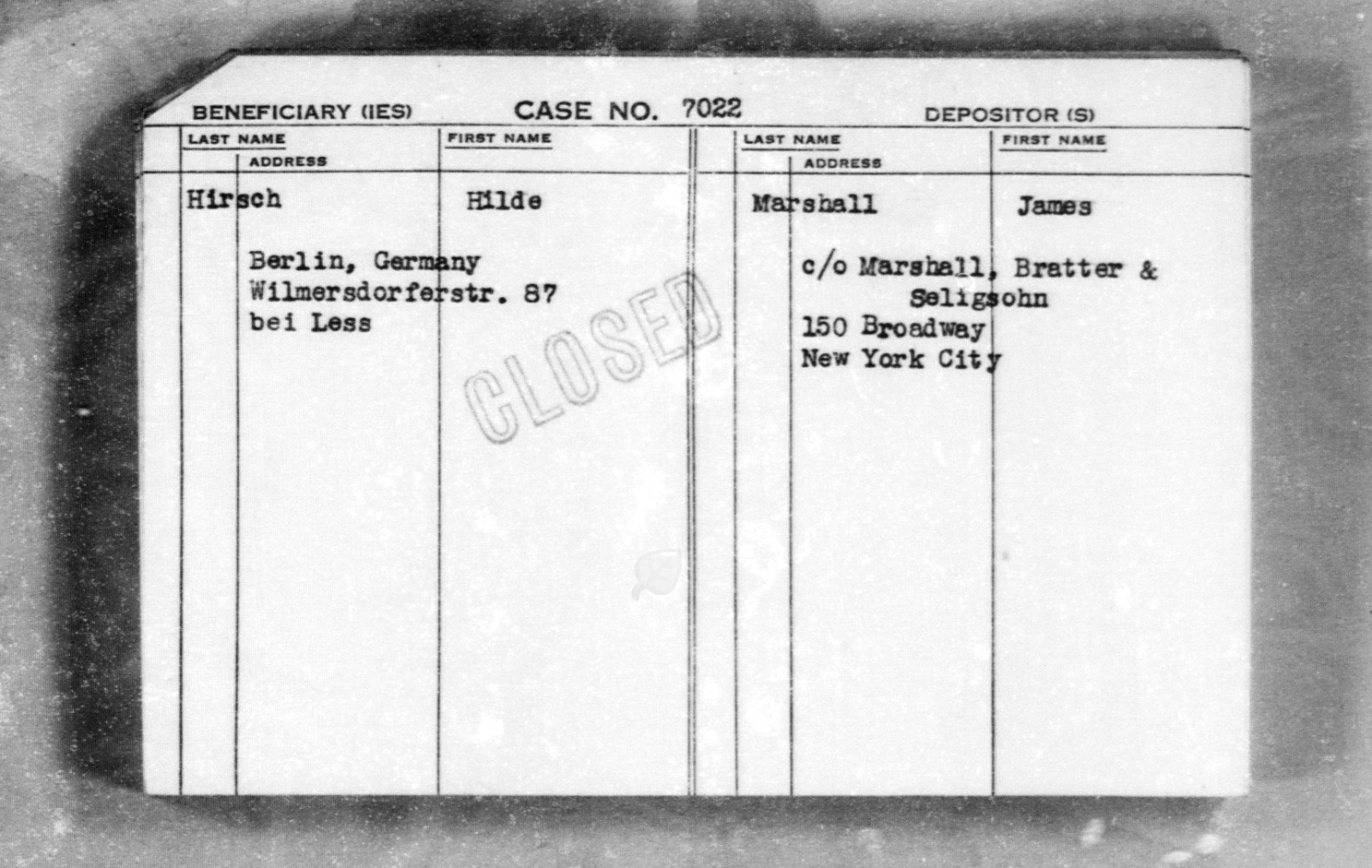
- A Transmigration Bureau deposit card, case no. 7022, showing a beneficiary named Hilde Hirsch, of Berlin, and Depositor James Marshall, of New York City.
- Formation: June 21, 1940; 86 years ago
- Founder: American Jewish Joint Distribution Committee
- Founded at: New York City, United States
- Dissolved: 1956
- Type: Non-profit
- Headquarters: New York City, United States
- Parent organization: American Jewish Joint Distribution Committee

The Jewish Transmigration Bureau was a relief agency created by the American Jewish Joint Distribution Committee (JDC) in the early years of World War II to provide funds for the emigration of Jews from European countries where they faced persecution.

== Overview ==
From 1940-56, the Bureau received donations from tens of thousands of American donors to cover the travel costs of prospective emigrants. These funds allowed Jewish beneficiaries from Germany, Austria, Czechoslovakia, the Netherlands, Belgium and Luxembourg to settle in over 40 countries in Western Europe, the Americas, the Middle East, and Asia. "Deposit cards," thousands of which are extant and publicly searchable, link the names of emigrants with the depositor who provided the funds to cover the cost of their relocation.

== History ==
Due to increasingly violent antisemitism in Europe in the 1930s and the rise of Nazism, which codified it in the Nuremberg Laws of 1935, Jews were forced to consider fleeing their own countries in order to avoid persecution, imprisonment, and death. A leading force in assisting persecuted Jews was the American Jewish Joint Distribution Committee (JDC), which provided relief in the form of programs for health, nutrition, and education. The JDC also supported early relocation efforts. From 1933-1939, JDC affiliates helped 110,000 Jews emigrate from Germany alone. Relocation efforts launched either by or in conjunction with the JDC, and to which the Transmigration Bureau was a successor, included the Service de Transmigration of the Comité d’Assistance aux Réfugiés Juifs (CARJ) (Committee for the Assistance of Jewish Refugees) in Brussels in 1938 and the Comité d’Aide et d’Assistance aux Victimes de l’Antisémitisme en Allemagne (Committee for Aid and Assistance of Victims of Antisemitism in Germany) in 1932.

Building upon the success of these efforts, the Transmigration Bureau was established in New York City on June 21, 1940. Around this time, the JDC moved its European headquarters from Nazi-occupied Paris to Lisbon, which served as the port of embarkation for the majority of Transmigration Bureau beneficiaries. The mechanism used by the Bureau was simple but effective. American "depositors" would donate funds to the Bureau, which would then hold the funds in escrow until the "beneficiary" could make the necessary travel arrangements (reservations, permits, visas, etc.). A year after its founding, the Bureau had received over $3.7 million in contributions to support the migration of 29,000 Jews, and over 50,000 by the end of 1941.

== See also ==
- American Jewish Joint Distribution Committee
- The Holocaust
- Rescuers of Jews during the Holocaust
