= Oliver Ringelhahn =

Austrian singer and opera singer (born 1969)

Oliver Ringelhahn (born 1969 in Tulln an der Donau) is an Austrian opera, operetta, songs and oratorio singer (tenor).
