= Gary Lux =

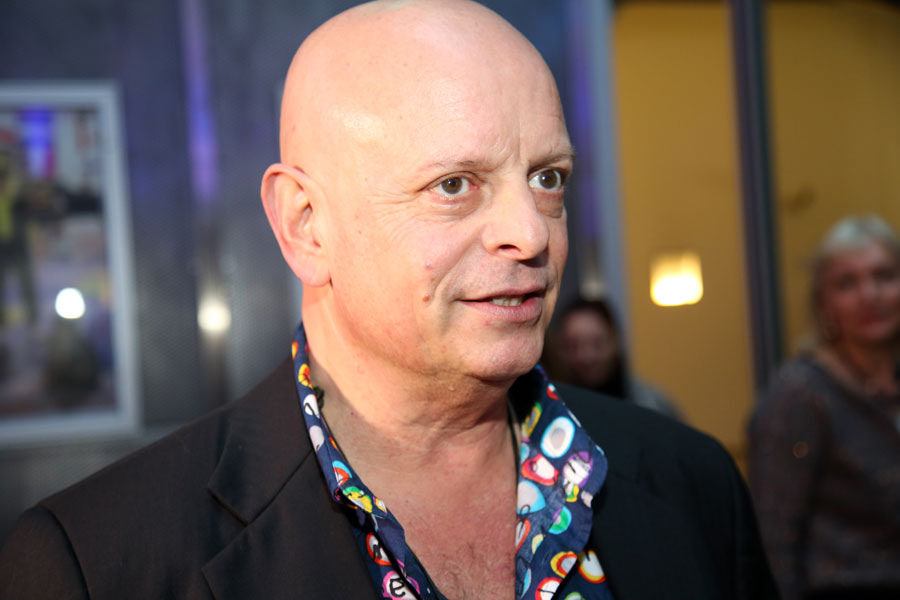
- Gary Lux in 2015

Background information
- Born: 26 January 1959 (age 67); Kingston, Ontario, Canada
- Occupation: Singer

Gerhard "Gary" Lux (born 26 January 1959) is a Canadian-born Austrian singer, most famous for having represented his country in the Eurovision Song Contest on six occasions.

== Career ==
Lux has released solo albums entitled "Dreidimensional" and "City of Angels" inspired by some time he had spent in Los Angeles.

Lux performed for Austria on the following occasions:

- 1983 as a member of Westend performing "Hurricane"
- 1984 providing backing for Anita performing "Einfach weg"
- 1985 as a solo artist performing "Kinder dieser Welt"
- 1987 as a solo artist performing "Nur noch Gefühl"
- 1993 providing backing for Tony Wegas performing "Maria Magdalena"
- 1995 providing backing for Stella Jones performing "Die Welt dreht sich verkehrt"

As a composer, Lux was placed second in the Austrian national heat for Eurovision in 1994 with the song "Solitaire" performed by Three Girl Madhouse. Gary also sang a duet with Gitti Seuberth at the 1984 Austrian final Komm hoit mi which placed 2nd.

== Personal life ==
He was born in Ontario, Canada but returned to live in Austria with his parents as a young boy. He was married to Marianne (died of cancer on 4 April 2011) and has 2 sons, Benny and Dennis.

== Sources ==
- Entries for Gary Lux

| Preceded by Mess | Austria in the Eurovision Song Contest; 1983 (member of Westend) | Succeeded by Anita |
| Preceded by Anita | Austria in the Eurovision Song Contest; 1985 | Succeeded by Timna Brauer |
| Preceded by Timna Brauer | Austria in the Eurovision Song Contest; 1987 | Succeeded by Wilfried |
