= Austropop =

Musical genre

- Stylistic origins: Pop music, rock music
- Cultural origins: 1960s, Austria

Austropop is pop music from Austria, which came into use in the late 1960s, but had its heyday in the 1970s and early and up until the mid-1980s. Austropop comprises several musical styles, from traditional pop music to rock, and it also sometimes includes traditional folk elements such as yodeling.

Austropop artists usually distinguish themselves from German genres by using decidedly Austrian dialects for their lyrics. For example, Neue Deutsche Welle does not count as Austropop, as not only do the artists originate from Germany, but their lyrics are also in Standard German.

The movement is believed to have started in 1971 by Wolfgang Ambros with his song "Da Hofa", although this is debated. Ambros became famous, however, by translating songs by Bob Dylan into Austrian German, the most famous of which is "Naa, i bins ned", the translation of Dylan's "It Ain't Me Babe".

Austropop is still broadcast by various FM radio and TV stations throughout Austria and Bavaria, where they even have special nights replaying Austropop concerts.
