= Ephixa =

Canadian music producer (born 1990)

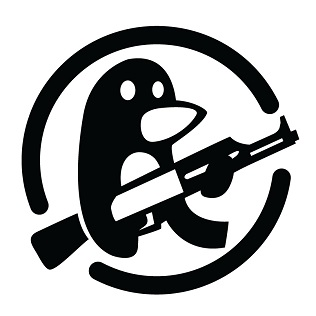
- Ephixa's logo, depicting a penguin holding a rifle

Background information
- Born: James Leusink; April 13, 1990 (age 36); Ontario, Canada
- Genres: EDM; hardstyle; dubstep; house; future house; synthwave
- Occupations: Disc jockey; record producer; remixer; composer; live streamer
- Instruments: FL Studio; Native Instruments Maschine
- Years active: 2007–present
- Labels: Monstercat; Ninety9Lives; GameChops; Electric Bird Records; NoCopyrightSounds
- Website: ephixa.com

YouTube information
- Channel: DjEphixa
- Years active: 2008–present
- Genre: Music
- Subscribers: 439,000
- Views: 157 million
- Last updated: 4 August 2026

James Leusink (born April 13, 1990), better known by his alias Ephixa (sometimes stylised as ephixa), is a Canadian electronic music producer who lives in Ontario, Canada. He is best known for his viral "Charlie Sheen Bi-Winning" dubstep remix, remixes of music from The Legend of Zelda franchise as well as various other remixes and original electronic music. Leusink peaked at #11 on Billboard's Next Big Sound chart in November 2011. Ephixa is also known for the first ever single released by the Canadian record label Monstercat, "Dubstep Killed Rock 'n' Roll", also being the co-founder of the previously mentioned record label.

== Early life ==
Leusink was born on April 13, 1990. His interest in music started when he was eight years old, playing the keyboard without prior lessons. He got his first guitar several years later, began taking lessons, and joined various bands. Leusink's work in electronic music began while he was developing video games in his spare time, desired to create a soundtrack for his various games. Originally influenced by hardstyle artists such as Alphaverb, Showtek, and Evil Activities, Leusink has used the digital audio workstation FL Studio to produce his music.

== Career ==
=== 2010 to 2011: Zelda Step, "Charlie Sheen Bi-Winning Dubstep", and "Sanctuary" ===
On April 10, 2010, Leusink released his second EP, Zelda Step. The project featured remixes of "Lost Woods", "Song of Storms" and "Gerudo Valley" from The Legend of Zelda: Ocarina of Time, as well as a remix of "Dragon Roost Island" from The Legend of Zelda: The Wind Waker. The album received mixed to positive reviews, with Jade Royal of Sputnikmusic giving the EP a 3.5 out of 5 rating, stating "It's a thin line that Ephixa treads with 'Zelda Step', but one that ultimately pleases more than disdains". Elton Jones of Complex later placed Leusink's remix of "Lost Woods" as the best remix of a video game theme song, finalising his review of the song with "The Legend of Zelda Lost Woods theme mixed with dubstep sounds incredible."

On March 2, 2011, Leusink released "Charlie Sheen Bi-Winning Dubstep", a remix featuring footage of Charlie Sheen from an interview originally broadcast on American TV series 20/20. Within two days of its release, the remix had been viewed over 700,000 times and received over 7,500 likes on YouTube, becoming one of the site's most popular and viral videos at the time.

On September 19, 2011, Leusink released his dubstep remix of the song "Sanctuary", originally by English trance producer Gareth Emery. The remix was included in an extended play based on the original song, titled Sanctuary (The Remixes). When reviewing the extended play, a writer for DJ Mag commented on Leusink's remix, stating that he had gone for a "twitchy, spasmodic bit of dubstep-ery, which is ok, of the type". In the week of November 5, 2011, Leusink entered and peaked at number 11 on Billboard's Next Big Sound chart.

=== 2012 to 2015: Monstercat, Hiatus, "Catfish", and "Machina" ===
On August 3, 2012, Leusink released "Awesome To The Max", which the Your EDM staff described as "heavy but laid back, and a gift for fans of dubstep and Monstercat alike". On August 25, Leusink collaborated with American producer Varien and Canadian duo Project 46 to release "The Anthem". The collaboration was released alongside an animated music video to celebrate Monstercat's one year anniversary. Both "Awesome To The Max" and "The Anthem" appeared on Monstercat's ninth compilation album, Monstercat 009 – Reunion. Both songs were later featured on Monstercat's Best of 2012 compilation album.

In November 2012, Leusink left Monstercat, continuing to release music independently. On November 16, he released "Fuck The System", a mashup of himself, Deadmau5, TVDS, and Showtek. The song was released to promote "Fuck the 9to5 jobs". On January 17, 2013, Leusink released "Unraveled Reality", which Steve Jacobs of EDM Sauce wrote that the track "offers a bit of a soothing feel along with some big drum sounds". In 2013, Leusink went on hiatus. During a Reddit AMA, The Monstercat staff were questioned about what happened to Leusink, which they answered:

"Ephixa, as an artist, took some time off to focus on other projects and his personal life. However, word on the street is that he is back at producing and we are looking forward to hearing his new work."

— Monstercat staff responding to a user about what happened to Leusink

On June 30, 2014, a year after he released "Unraveled Reality" and almost two years after he released "The Anthem", Leusink independently released "Catfish". EDMTunes' James Brannigan noted the song for its minimalist trance progression, later writing that as soon as "the drop hits, Ephixa brings back the sound he used to win all of our hearts with as he did in his dubstep remix of 'Song of Storms'".

On February 5, 2015, Leusink released his remix of American electronic producer Dex Arson's song "Machina" as part of the latter's extended play Welcome to War. Writing for EDMTunes, James Brannigan noted the remix for its diversity and described it as "bearing a resemblance to Excision's style". Matthew Meadow of Your EDM wrote that Luesink had transformed the original song into a "genre-hopping, deep and rumbling tune bound to blow your speakers", later stating that the synths used were "wonderfully bubbly and sinister at the same time, allowing for an extremely diverse and layered track, just the kind of thing I live for".

=== 2016 to 2017: Return to Monstercat and subsequent releases ===
On July 4, 2016, nearly 4 years after his last release on Monstercat, Leusink collaborated with Stephen Walking to release "Matches" as part of Monstercat's 5 Year Anniversary, featuring Aaron Richards as vocals. The collaboration was previously featured in Leusink's 2014 mini-mix Wip Rip Reel under the working title "Old Dennis". At the time, Leusink stated that the track would "most likely never" be finished. The song was later voted by fans to be featured as part of Monstercat's Best of 2016 compilation album.

On February 2, 2017, Leusink collaborated with Laura Brehm to release "Losing You" on Monstercat. Billie-Darian Hollyhead of Playing With Sound called the song a "beautiful progressive house track", noting Brehms' vocals as "truly stunning as they lay on top of the oscillating beats". The song was later featured as part of Monstercat's Best of 2017 compilation album. On August 19, 2017, Leusink appeared on Laura Brehm's remix album Breathe EP Remixes.

On July 5, 2017, Leusink released the song "Skyforth" as part of Rocket League x Monstercat Vol. 1, the first collaborative album between Monstercat and San Diego–based video game developer Psyonix. The song appeared in the in-game soundtrack of Psyonix's 2015 video game Rocket League, alongside 17 other songs by various artists including Slushii, Aero Chord, Vicetone, Tristam, and Rogue.

On October 26, 2017, Leusink collaborated with Laura Brehm to release "Deja Vu" on the latter's own record label Electric Bird Records. Your EDM's Landon Fleury compared the song to Leusink's previous song "Skyforth", wring that the tack "sees Ephixa continuing down the house path in a similar way to his song 'Skyforth', but with a distinctly stronger groove and fresh vocal chops to top everything off". Fleury later noted Brehm's vocals as ones that "really soar, elevating the production to its maximum potential".

On December 13, 2017, Leusink collaborated with electronic music producer Bossfight to release "Subside" on Monstercat. Writing for Your EDM, Landon Fleury wrote about the song's influences from various electronic dance music genres including chiptune, synthwave, bass house, and trap, stating that the song "sees Ephixa turning back to the heavier-leaning sound his musical career was founded on, diving into electro at full power" and concluding his review by writing "Simply said, it's a variety of different sounds and styles that somehow fit together perfectly in the end". The song was later featured on Monstercat Uncaged Vol. 4, the first compilation album released by Monstercat since their Uncaged and Instinct re-branding in January earlier in the year. The song appeared on Monstercat's Best of 2018 compilation album.

=== Since 2018: "Dreamstate", "Sundance", and Monstercat's 8 Year Anniversary Adventure ===
On August 10, 2018, Leusink released "Dreamstate" on Monstercat. A writer of T.H.E - Music Essentials described the song as a refresh of Leusink's style, writing that the song production has been made "very thoughtfully and yet, allows one to freely flow through its rhythms." The song was later featured as part of Monstercat's second Instinct series compilation album titled Monstercat Instinct Vol. 2, alongside 39 other songs by various artists, including The Night, Fwlr, Julian Calor, and Vicetone.

On June 11, 2019, Leusink collaborated with electronic music producer Heartful to release the synthwave song "Sundance". The song was later added to the video game Rocket League as part the second phase of the latter's Radical Summer in-game event. Leusink and Heartful were joined by other Monstercat artists included in the update, including 7 Minutes Dead, Desert Star, Televisor, Tut Tut Child, Varien, and Wrld.

On July 1, Leusink collaborated with Canadian DJ and Producer Going Quantum to release the drum and bass song "Let's Roll." The next day, Leusink collaborated with Stephen Walking to release the song "Problems". Both songs were released as part of Monstercat's 8 Year Anniversary album, titled Monstercat's 8 Year Anniversary Adventure, released on July 12.

On November 17, 2020, Animated electronic music duo Half an Orange released their extended play Mostly We Grow Pt. 3. Their electro-rock collaboration with Leusink, "Time Travel Kool Aid", was included as the first song on the extended play.

== Discography ==
=== Albums and EPs ===
Title	Details
The Beginning & Old School	Released: February 20, 2009; Label: Self-released; Format: Digital download
Zelda Step	Released: April 10, 2010; Label: Self-released; Format: Digital download
Some Wobbles	Released: September 13, 2011; Label: Monstercat; Format: Digital download
Matches (The Remixes)	Released: November 9, 2016; Label: Monstercat; Format: Digital download

==== As a featured artist ====
Title	Details
Sanctuary - The Remixes by Gareth Emery	Released: September 19, 2011; Label: Garuda; Format: Digital download
Hello EP by Going Quantum	Released: May 7, 2012; Label: Monstercat; Format: Digital download
Welcome to War EP by Dex Arson	Released: February 5, 2015; Label: Dex Arson; Format: Digital download
Smooth McGroove Remixed 2 by Smooth McGroove	Released: January 14, 2017; Label: GameChops; Format: Digital download
Nope Remixes by OMFG	Released: March 3, 2017; Label: HappyToast; Format: Digital download
Bipolar Rampage Squad by Dex Arson	Released: July 31, 2017; Label: Dex Arson; Format: Digital download
Breathe EP Remixes by Laura Brehm	Released: August 25, 2017; Label: Electric Bird Records; Format: Digital download
Synthrunners by Powercyan	Released: June 28, 2018; Label: Self-released; Format: Digital download
Impression by Road Lizard	Released: January 11, 2019; Label: Self-released; Format: Digital download
Classics Remixed by TheFatRat	Released: June 12, 2020; Label: The Arcadium; Format: Digital download
Mostly We Grow Pt. 3 by Half an Orange	Released: November 17, 2020; Label: Monstercat; Format: Digital download

=== Singles ===
Title	Year	Album	Label
Bad Apple	2010	Non-album singles	Self-released
Chipskream	2010	Non-album singles	Self-released
Above the Lawl (Featuring DJ Cafe)	2010	Non-album singles	Self-released
PianoDubs	2010	Non-album singles	Self-released
Always Bored	2011	Non-album singles	Self-released
Give You Back Life (with Swifty & Starwarspunk)	2011	Non-album singles	Self-released
Fall Silently (Featuring Veela)	2011	Non-album singles	Self-released
Turret Error	2011	Non-album singles	Self-released
Dubstep Killed Rock 'n' Roll	2011	Monstercat 001 – Launch Week	Monstercat
Some Wobbles	2011	Monstercat 002 – Early Stage, Some Wobbles EP	Monstercat
Division	2011	Monstercat 003 – Momentum	Monstercat
Audiocidity	2011	Monstercat 004 – Identity	Monstercat
Substance (with Stephen Walking)	2012	Monstercat 005 – Evolution	Monstercat
Trance Chords	2012	Monstercat 006 – Embrace	Monstercat
Ideekay	2012	Monstercat 007 – Solace	Monstercat
Substance VIP (with Stephen Walking)	2012	Non-album single	Self-released
Awesome to the Max	2012	Monstercat 009 – Reunion	Monstercat
The Anthem (with Project 46 & Varien)	2012	Monstercat 009 – Reunion	Monstercat
Unraveled Reality	2013	Non-album single	Self-released
Catfish	2014	Non-album single	Self-released
Chipstuff	2015	Non-album single	Self-released
Awesome to the Max VIP	2015	Non-album single	Self-released
Depth (with Cidi)	2015	Non-album single	Self-released
Retrospect	2015	Non-album single	Self-released
Space Panda (with Cidi)	2015	Non-album single	Self-released
Dewpit	2016	Non-album single	Self-released
Club Penguin	2016	Non-album single	Self-released
Matches (with Stephen Walking)	2016	Monstercat 5 Year Anniversary	Monstercat
Cobra (with Holder)	2016	Cheat Code 2.0	Ninety9Lives
Everlasting (With Jim Yosef)	2016	Non-album single	NoCopyrightSounds
2080 (with Heartful)	2017	Ninety9lives 90: Care Package	Ninety9Lives
Losing You (with Laura Brehm)	2017	Monstercat 030 – Finale	Monstercat
Skyforth	2017	Rocket League x Monstercat Vol. 1	Monstercat
Deja Vu (with Laura Brehm)	2017	Non-album single	Electric Bird Records
Subside (with Bossfight)	2017	Monstercat Uncaged Vol. 4	Monstercat
Dreamstate	2018	Monstercat Instinct Vol. 2	Monstercat
Easy (with Road Lizard)	2018	Impression	Self-released
Sundance (with Heartful)	2019	Non-album singles	Monstercat
Let's Roll (with Going Quantum)	2019	Monstercat's 8 Year Anniversary Adventure	Monstercat
Problems (with Stephen Walking)	2019	Monstercat's 8 Year Anniversary Adventure	Monstercat
Time Travel Kool Aid (with Half an Orange)	2020	Mostly We Grow Pt. 3	Monstercat
Bird Gun Dub	2024	Non-album singles	Party Animal
Sorry Bout Dat	2026	Cyepher Tape/Spring 2026	Interval Audio

=== Remixes ===
Title	Year	Artist	Label
3	2009	Britney Spears	Self-released
Blue (Da Ba Dee)	2009	Eiffel 65	Self-released
Song of Storms (Hardstyle Mix)	2009	Koji Kondo	Self-released
Song of Storms (Dubstep Mix)	2010	Koji Kondo	Self-released
Song of Storms (Zelda Step Mix)	2010	Koji Kondo	Self-released
Lost Woods	2010	Koji Kondo	Self-released
Aquatic Ambience	2010	David Wise	Self-released
Sierra Leone	2011	Mt Eden Dubstep	Self-released
Charlie Sheen Bi-Winning	2011	20/20	Self-released
When I look at you (with Stephen Walking)	2011	Emalkay	Self-released
Piano Tune (with Stephen Walking)	2011	Bar9	Self-released
Nyan Cat	2011	saraj00n	Self-released
Night Vision	2011	Veela	Self-released
Gerudo Valley	2011	Koji Kondo	Self-released
Dragon Roost Island	2011	Koji Kondo	Self-released
Sanctuary	2011	Gareth Emery (featuring Lucy Saunders)	Garuda
Hello	2012	Going Quantum	Monstercat
Run Away From Me	2012	DotEXE	Self-released
Tristram Village	2012	Russell Brower	Self-released
Gourmet Race	2012	Jun Ishikawa	Self-released
Machina	2015	Dex Arson	Self-released
The Girl	2015	Hellberg (featuring Cozi Zuehlsdorff)	Self-released
Waifu Dream	2015	Sushi Killer	Self-released
Stone Tower Temple (with Will & Tim)	2015	Koji Kondo	Self-released
Howling Fjord	2015	Russell Brower	Self-released
Overwatch Main Theme	2016	Derek Duke	Self-released
Victory Fanfare (with Holder)	2016	Nobuo Uematsu	GameChops
Midna's Lament	2016	Toru Minegishi	Self-released
Ride	2016	Astha (featuring Manny Rite)	Self-released
Home	2016	Toby Fox	GameChops
Zelda's Lullaby (with Will & Tim)	2017	Koji Kondo	GameChops
Dr. Wily Stage	2017	Smooth McGroove	GameChops
Let Go	2017	Deadmau5 (featuring Grabbitz)	Self-released
Nope	2017	OMFG	HappyToast
Rampage	2017	Dex Arson	Self-released
Parallel	2017	Laura Brehm	Electric Bird Records
Plutocracy	2018	Powercyan	Self-released
Monody	2020	TheFatRat (featuring Laura Brehm)	The Arcadium

== Awards and nominations ==
=== Accolades ===
Year	Publisher	Country	Accolade	Rank
2011	Billboard	United States	Next Big Sound	11
