= Losing You (Ephixa and Laura Brehm song) =

Single by Ephixa and Laura Brehm

from the album Monstercat 030 – Finale
- Released: 1 February 2017
- Genre: Progressive house
- Length: 4:31
- Label: Monstercat
- Songwriters: Laura Brehm; Paul Craddock; James Leusink
- Producer: James Leusink

Ephixa singles chronology
"2080" (2017)	"Losing You" (2017)	"Skyforth" (2017)

Laura Brehm singles chronology
"Don't Wait" (2016)	"Losing You" (2017)	"Daylight" (2017)

"Losing You" is a song by Canadian electronic music producer Ephixa and American singer-songwriter Laura Brehm. Canadian record label Monstercat released it on 1 February 2017. The song was originally released as part of the compilation album Monstercat 030 – Finale, released 22 February 2017. It was later featured as part of Monstercat's Best of 2017 compilation album, released on 18 December 2017.

== Background and release ==
Prior to the release of "Losing You", Ephixa collaborated with Stephen Walking and Aaron Richards to release "Matches", as part of Monstercat's 5 Year Anniversary compilation album in July 2016. Although Ephixa had marked his first release on Monstercat after a four-year hiatus, various fans speculated that it was only meant to be a one-off release to celebrate the anniversary and did not signify Ephixa's return to releasing music through the record label. Through the release of "Losing You" however, Ephixa had officially confirmed his return to Monstercat.

On 1 February 2017, the song was released as a digital download on international digital stores through Canadian record label Monstercat, as well as being released through various music streaming services. "Losing You" was featured on the compilation album titled Monstercat 030 – Finale released on 22 February 2017. The song was later featured on the yearly best-of compilation album titled Monstercat: Best of 2017 released on 18 December 2017. As of 18 November 2019, the song has gained around 1,460,000 plays on SoundCloud and over 6,272,000 and 2,025,000 views on Laura Brehm's and Monstercat's YouTube channels respectively.

== Critical reception ==
"Losing You" was well received by most critics. Playing With Sound's Billie-Darian Hollyhead noted Brehms' vocals as "truly stunning as they lay on top of the oscillating beats", describing it as a "beautiful progressive house track." Jim Babaoglu of EDM Sauce wrote about the song's composition, writing that "with each layer, the song gains size until the percussion and vocals enter", further noting that Ephixa had provided a "stunning backdrop that is only enhanced by Laura Brehm's astonishing voice" and finalising his review by stating that the two artists had created a "monumental track together." Writing for Noiseporn, Sydney Goldberg noted the song as having a "lovers drifting apart" theme, with Ephixa doing so by creating a "thin layer between his instrumentals and Laura's vocals as if they were on different planes, or better yet, planets." Your EDM's Landon Fleury praised the song, writing that Ephixa had brought his "A-game" and that the song is a work of "top-tier progressive house", describing the song as taking inspiration from other notable artists in the progressive house scene, notably Deadmau5.

== Track listing ==
Digital download – Single
No.	Title	Length
1.	"Losing You"	4:31
2.	"Losing You" (Instrumental)	4:31
Total length:		9:02

== Credits and personnel ==
Credits adapted from the American Society of Composers, Authors and Publishers (ASCAP) page of "Losing You":

Personnel

- Songwriting – Laura Brehm, Paul Craddock, and James Leusink
- Production – Production – James Leusink and Laura Brehm

== Release history ==
Region	Date	Format	Version	Label	Ref.
Worldwide	1 February 2017	Digital download	"Losing You"	Monstercat	
Worldwide	22 February 2017	Digital download	Monstercat 030 – Finale	Monstercat	
Worldwide	18 December 2017	Digital download	Monstercat: Best of 2017	Monstercat	
