= Music of Rocket League =

Music from the vehicular soccer video game Rocket League

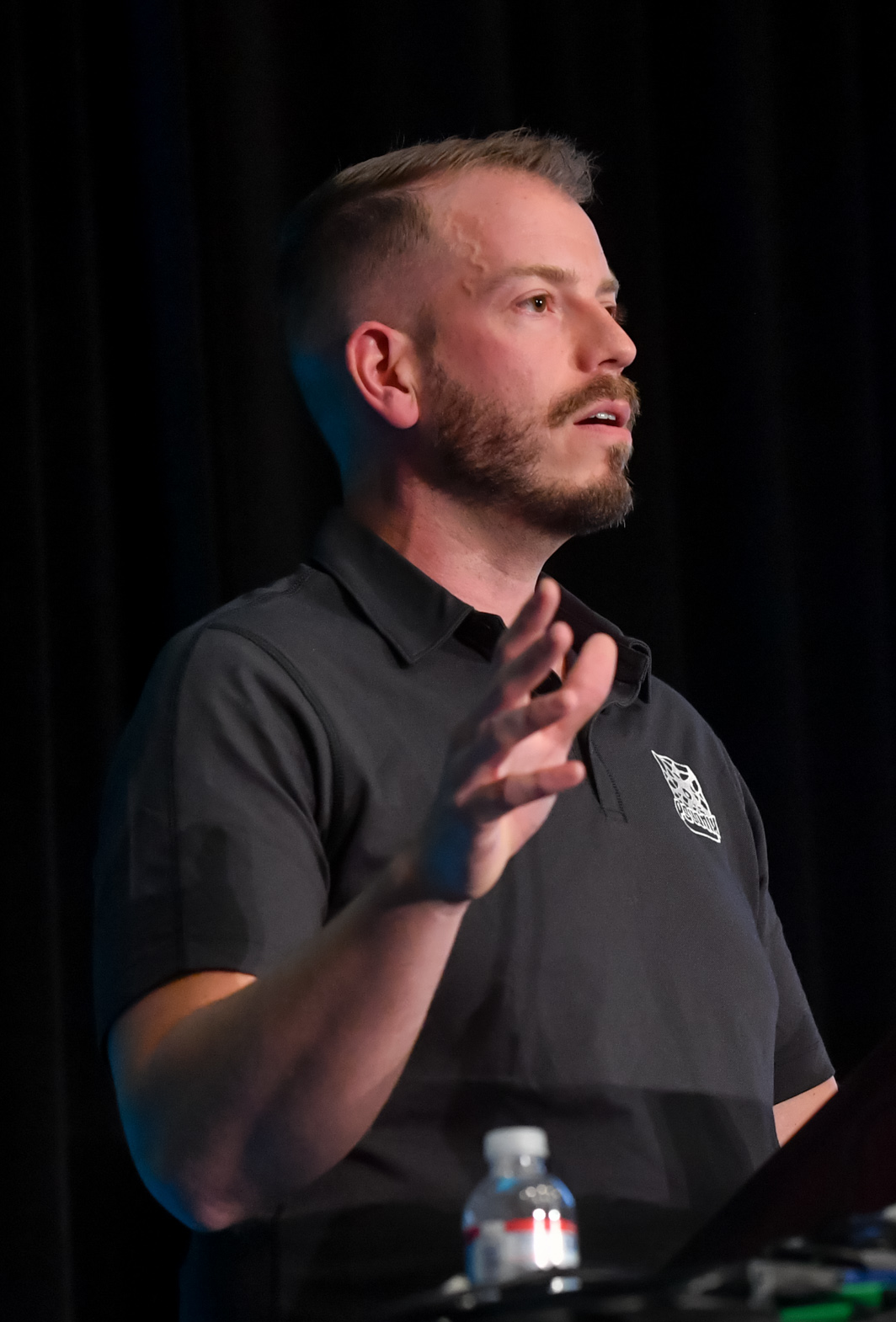
Psyonix audio director Mike Ault

The music of Rocket League, a vehicular football video game developed and published by Psyonix, is a compilation of electronic dance music (EDM) produced and curated by Psyonix audio director Mike Ault. It currently features music from 45 different artists, and has spawned a discography of four albums and four extended plays. The original soundtrack was produced by Ault and his band Hollywood Principle. Ault, having experimented with different genres, used personal projects unrelated to Rocket League as a base for the soundtrack. What followed was an EDM soundtrack inspired by early-to-mid 2000s progressive house music that Ault and Psyonix felt "embodied the spirit of the game." When in-game, the music is controlled using the playlist system "Rocket League Radio". Positive feedback from players, in addition to Ault's vision of a "big budget" playlist sound emulating Triple-A sports games such as the EA Sports titles, inspired him and the team to feature independent artists to be included in Rocket League's soundtrack. Ault credits the success of the soundtrack to the appeal of the EDM genre to the game's player base. In 2017, Canadian EDM label Monstercat partnered with Psyonix and began to feature its artists, and their music, in Rocket League, with multiple volumes featuring the music being released by the label.

== Artists ==
=== Mike Ault ===
"Rocket League Main Menu (Concept 01)"
An early, more melodic concept for the menu music in Rocket League, produced by Mike Ault during development

"Rocket League Theme"
The final version of the main theme of Rocket League, sporting hallmarks of the electronic dance music genre

The original soundtrack to Rocket League was composed and produced by Psyonix audio director Mike Ault and his band Hollywood Principle, an EDM troupe started in 2013 by Ault with producer Elliott Sencan and vocalist Kayla Hope. Ault was hired by Psyonix in 2011 to lead the studio's new audio department, after having fulfilled a similar role as a contractor for inXile Entertainment during development of the dark fantasy game Hunted: The Demon's Forge. Ault began work at the studio as the lead sound designer on the gothic fantasy game Nosgoth, Psyonix's last project before Rocket League. When Ault began work on Rocket League in 2013, it marked a departure from six years of dark fantasy games; a change that Ault welcomed as he transitioned from "gory-type setting[s]" to "cars, boosts, and mechanical sounds." Ault oversaw the production of both the game's sound design and music, with an adaptive creative process in which he consistently sought to improve upon ideas, reiterating on various components of the game's audio before settling on a final version. Without the financial resources to license popular music, the idea of sounding "big budget", à la EA Sports titles, was a goal highlighted by Ault. For the game's menu music, Ault and the developers constantly cycled through inspirations from the "brassy, regal" sound of SportsCenter and Monday Night Football to Nintendo 64 games, among other genres such as heavy rock and thrash punk.

As development on the game progressed, the team felt that the single track used for the menu had become stale. As a solution, Ault created an in-game playlist consisting of a large number of tracks created by Ault and other members of the staff. The most popular music among the game's team were a number of Ault's personal tracks worked on before he arrived at Psyonix, including "Flying Forever", which was a 2011 collaboration with vocalist Morgan Perry. Ault never intended for the music to be used in a game soundtrack when creating them, though he and the developers felt comfortable with the tracks, and deemed that they "embodied the spirit of the game." For Ault, the diverse "playlist" feel of the soundtrack helped achieve his goal of a "big budget" sound for the game. This new soundtrack for Rocket League was predominantly electronic dance music (EDM), inspired by early-mid 2000s progressive house artists such as ATB, deadmau5, and Kaskade. The "Rocket League Theme" was composed and produced with the timing of the title screen in mind. Ault worked with UI artist Jared Adkins to time out the theme's opening build-up to anticipate the appearance of the title screen. Future tracks that were featured on the title screen were edited in a similar way, including Hollywood Principle's "Firework" and "Breathing Underwater (Ether Remix)", which were similarly shortened and edited to fit the opening cues. Five officially released tracks from the Rocket League soundtrack were credited to Hollywood Principle. Ault describes the Hollywood Principle discography as a "sincere attempt to actually do something with music", in contrast to his earlier solo work.

Music produced by Ault and Hollywood Principle for Rocket League have been released on two soundtrack albums published by Psyonix. The first album was released on July 1, 2015, and included the original eleven tracks included with the game upon its release a week later. The second album, consisting additional music Ault and Hollywood Principle produced for the game's Supersonic Fury, Revenge of the Battle-Cars, and Chaos Run DLCs was released on Rocket League's first anniversary on July 7, 2016. The album also included the tracks "Scorched Earth" by Kevin Riepl and "Rocket League Throwback Anthem" by Adam B. Metal. A three-disc vinyl record compilation album entitled Rocket League: The Vinyl Collection was released by Iam8bit in December 2016. The compilation included all tracks from the first two soundtrack albums and features gatefold artwork by Dan Bronsema of Puddle & Splash. Pre-orders of the compilation included a download code for the albums. A limited edition of the album featuring picture discs decorated with the in-game cosmetic Invader, Lowrider, and Tempest wheel rims was also released, with a thousand copies produced. Iam8bit co-founder Jon Gibson described the idea for the picture discs, which was conceived during an email chain with Psyonix, as "such a simple thought", and that "connecting the fact that vinyl records spin and wheels spin [...] made for a really cool visual."

Albums

Rocket League (Official Game Soundtrack)
No.	Title	Artist	Length
1.	"Rocket League Theme"	Mike Ault	1:28
2.	"Angel Wings" (featuring Avianna Acid)	Mike Ault	6:07
3.	"Darkness"	Mike Ault; Christian De La Torre	7:30
4.	"Flying Forever" (featuring Morgan Perry)	Mike Ault	6:05
5.	"I Can Be" (featuring Crysta)	Mike Ault	4:18
6.	"In My Dreams" (featuring Nikki Wilkins)	Mike Ault	6:24
7.	"Lacuna"	Mike Ault	7:09
8.	"Love Thru the Night"	Mike Ault	5:07
9.	"We Speak Chinese"	Mike Ault; Abandoned Carnival	4:37
10.	"Seeing What's Next"	Hollywood Principle	3:19
11.	"Whiplash"	Hollywood Principle	7:17
Total length:			59:21

Rocket League (Official Game Soundtrack Vol. 2)
No.	Title	Artist	Length
1.	"Firework"	Hollywood Principle	3:07
2.	"Breathing Underwater (Ether Remix)"	Hollywood Principle	4:37
3.	"Looking to the Future"	Mike Ault	4:44
4.	"Escape from L.A. (Instrumental)"	Mike Ault; Abandoned Carnival	5:20
5.	"Seeing What's Next (Kev Frey Remix)"	Hollywood Principle; Kev Frey	5:05
6.	"When the Lights Come On (Instrumental)"	Mike Ault; Abandoned Carnival	5:54
7.	"Hard Buzz"	Mike Ault; Abandoned Carnival	3:22
8.	"Game Time"	Mike Ault; Abandoned Carnival	0:47
9.	"Scorched Earth"	Kevin Riepl	2:15
10.	"RLCS Theme"	Mike Ault	1:15
11.	"Rocket League Throwback Anthem"	Adam B. Metal	1:38
Total length:			38:04

Rocket League: The Vinyl Collection
No.	Title	Artist	Length
1.	"Rocket League Theme"	Mike Ault	1:28
2.	"Angel Wings" (featuring Avianna Acid)	Mike Ault	6:07
3.	"Darkness"	Mike Ault; Christian De La Torre	7:30
4.	"Flying Forever" (featuring Morgan Perry)	Mike Ault	6:05
5.	"I Can Be" (featuring Crysta)	Mike Ault	4:18
6.	"In My Dreams" (featuring Nikki Wilkins)	Mike Ault	6:24
7.	"Lacuna"	Mike Ault	7:09
8.	"Love Thru the Night"	Mike Ault	5:07
9.	"Seeing What's Next"	Hollywood Principle	3:19
10.	"We Speak Chinese"	Mike Ault; Abandoned Carnival	4:37
11.	"Whiplash"	Hollywood Principle	7:17
12.	"Firework"	Hollywood Principle	3:07
13.	"Breathing Underwater (Ether Remix)"	Hollywood Principle	4:37
14.	"Looking to the Future"	Mike Ault	4:44
15.	"Escape from L.A. (Instrumental)"	Mike Ault; Abandoned Carnival	5:20
16.	"Seeing What's Next (Kev Frey Remix)"	Hollywood Principle; Kev Frey	5:05
17.	"When the Lights Come On (Instrumental)"	Mike Ault; Abandoned Carnival	5:54
18.	"Hard Buzz"	Mike Ault; Abandoned Carnival	3:22
19.	"Game Time"	Mike Ault; Abandoned Carnival	0:47
20.	"Scorched Earth"	Kevin Riepl	2:15
21.	"RLCS Theme"	Mike Ault	1:15
22.	"Rocket League Throwback Anthem"	Adam B. Metal	1:38
Total length:			97:25

=== Indie artists ===
"Seeing What's Next" (Kev Frey Remix)
Kev Frey's Remix of "Seeing What's Next", one of many tracks by independent artists that were included with updates to Rocket League, following its release.

With the Supersonic Fury DLC and its associated update to Rocket League, the title screen music was changed to a brand new track, "Firework" by Hollywood Principle. The positive reception towards the track and the soundtrack change in general inspired Ault and Psyonix to make further changes to the soundtrack, and also recognized the potential for independent artists, who were not involved with Ault or Psyonix, to gain exposure through music features in the game. A remix contest was held on Indaba Music by Psyonix and Hollywood Principle in late 2015, challenging contestants to submit remixes of the band's track, "Seeing What's Next"; its winner, Kevin Frey, had his remix of the track featured on the title screen of the game's "Neo Tokyo" update. Other tracks by independent artists added through updates to the game include a remix of Hollywood Principle's "Breathing Underwater" by then-17-year-old Baltimore artist Ether, and the "Rocket League Throwback Anthem" by Warrnambool artist Adam B. Metal, who had previously composed the theme to Rocket League's predecessor, Supersonic Acrobatic Rocket-Powered Battle-Cars. In addition, notable video game composer Kevin Riepl, who had previously composed music for Gears of War, Crackdown 2, Aliens: Colonial Marines, and Hawken, produced the track "Scorched Earth", which became the theme for the game's Chaos Run DLC. All four aforementioned tracks were included on the second volume of the official Rocket League soundtrack.

In mid-2016, Ault approached German producer TheFatRat to inquire about including his music in Rocket League. He agreed, and a remixed version of his 2014 track "Infinite Power!" appeared in the game as the theme for the "Rumble" update. The track also appeared in trailers for the "Rumble" update. Afterwards, Ault entertained the possibility of "pushing someone that hasn't been exposed yet". The opportunity came after a friend of New Jersey artist Drunk Girl messaged Ault on Reddit, recommending his music to be featured. After being impressed by the song that was sent to him, Drunk Girl's "Don't Stop the Party" featuring vocalist Deanna, it would be added to the game's soundtrack. "Infinite Power!", "Don't Stop the Party", remixes of Hollywood Principle's "Firework" by Edmonton producer Melad and "Spell" by California producer Sando, have not featured on an official album release, though do feature in Rocket League Radio as part of the "Unreleased Tracks" playlist.

=== Monstercat ===
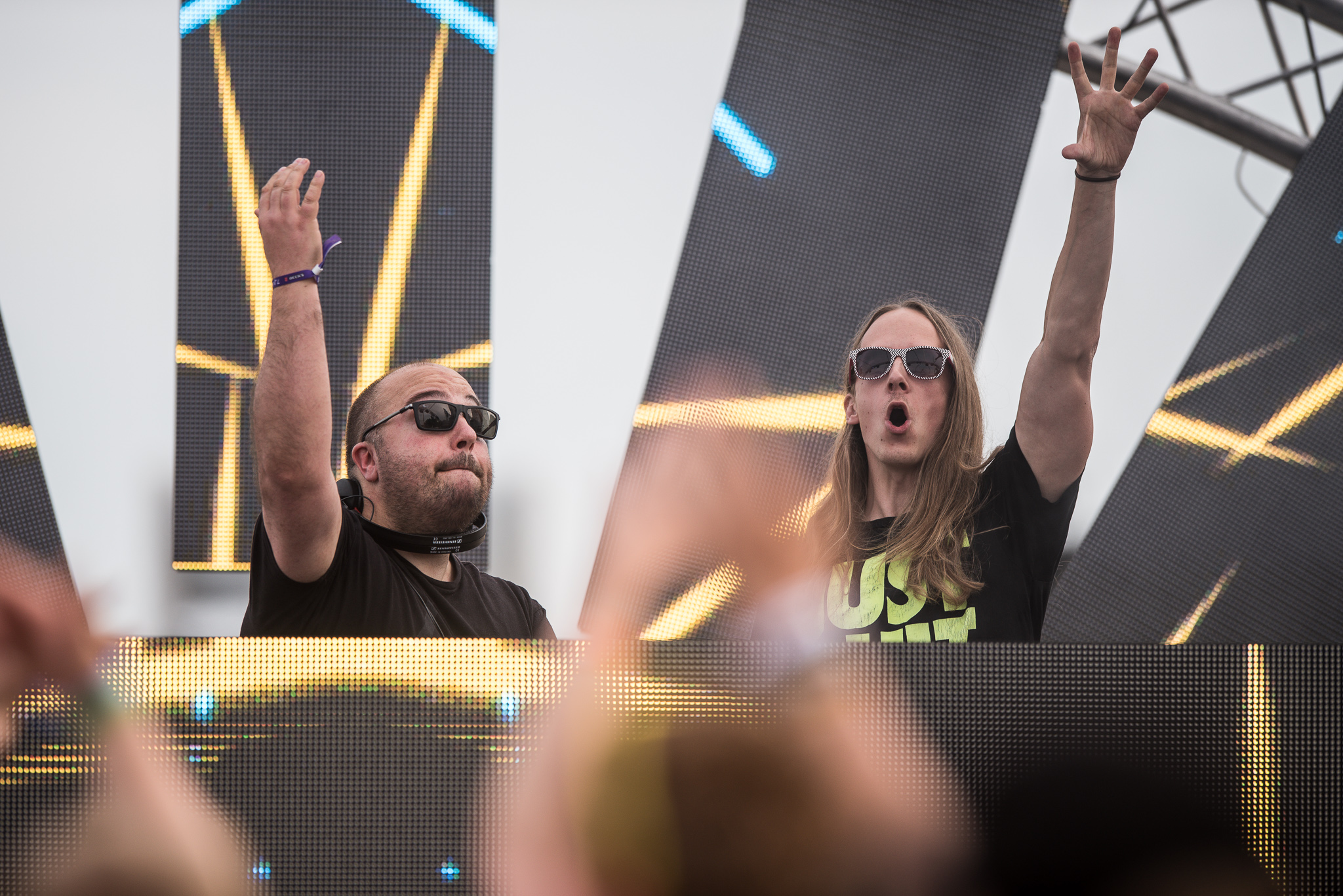
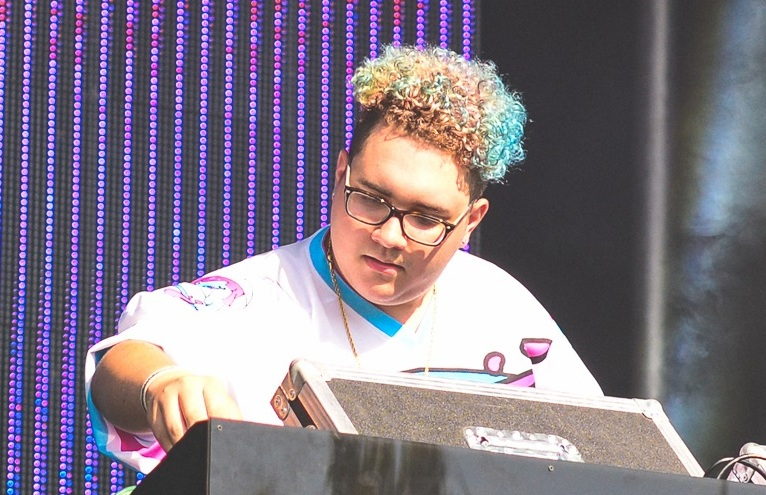
Monstercat artists Pegboard Nerds (left) and Slushii (right) were among many that produced music for the soundtrack, under the label's contributions to Rocket League since 2017.

In June 2017, Canadian EDM label Monstercat announced a collaboration with Psyonix to provide the soundtrack to Rocket League's second anniversary update. Monstercat had identified the gaming community as an important part of its audience, having described itself in Billboard as "synonymous with gaming since day one of its inception." Previous efforts by Monstercat to expand its gaming audience included licensing its music library for free use by streamers on video game live streaming site Twitch since the Twitch Music Library's launch in January 2015, and investing $1.1 million with Y Combinator and Extreme Ventures in Revlo, a chat interaction and monetization service for Twitch. Rocket League x Monstercat Vol. 1, an eighteen-track album published as part of the collaboration, was released on July 5, 2017. It features contributions from Aero Chord, Conro, Darren Styles, Ephixa, Notaker, Slushii, Vicetone, and other Monstercat artists. Its cover art, depicting the Monstercat logo painted on the hood of an Octane, was designed by digital artist Thaira Bouhid, using Cinema 4D. Conro's track, "All Me", was inspired by an eponymous affirmation towards his teammates in Rocket League when they have possession of the ball.

In January 2018, Monstercat established two imprints, Monstercat: Uncaged and Monstercat: Instinct, as part of a marketing refresh. The Uncaged imprint houses the label's bass-heavy artists, while Instinct houses the label's more melodic artists. To promote the new imprints, Uncaged and Instinct-themed extended plays were released alongside major feature updates to Rocket League, truncating the size of the albums from eighteen tracks for Rocket League x Monstercat, Vol. 1 to six tracks each for Vol. 2 onwards. The first Uncaged-themed EP, Rocket League x Monstercat Vol. 2, was released on April 2, 2018, to coincide with the game's "Tournaments" update. It featured music from Intercom, Koven, Pegboard Nerds, Protostar, Slippy, and Stonebank. The first Instinct EP, Rocket League x Monstercat Vol. 3, was released on May 25, 2018, four days prior to the release of Rocket League's summer-themed "Salty Shores" update. The compilation featured complementary summer-themed music from Aiobahn, Bad Computer, Dion Timmer, Duumu, Inverness, Soupandreas, Stephen Walking, and Vin, and cover art by Monstercat artist Amanda Cha. The Uncaged-themed fourth compilation, released on September 13, 2018, to coincide with the game's Season Nine update, featured electro house music from Bossfight, Infected Mushroom, Muzz, Pixel Terror, and Tokyo Machine. Dougal, Gammer, and Darren Styles also collaborated once again, after "Party Don't Stop" from Monstercat Uncaged Vol. 2, for the compilation's third track, "Burning Up". The Instinct-themed fifth volume released on November 30 was the last published in 2018, and featured music from CloudNone, Grant, Hyper Potions, Nokae, Rogue, Rootkit, and Smle.

On February 28, 2019, Psyonix announced that tracks from Rocket League x Monstercat Volumes 6 and 7 would be released throughout the year and available in-game on the same day as the individual song's release.

Albums

Rocket League x Monstercat Vol. 1
No.	Title	Artist	Length
1.	"Rock It"	Tokyo Machine	3:11
2.	"Fury"	Rogue	4:04
3.	"Luv U Need U"	Slushii	2:26
4.	"Bone Dry"	Tristam	4:45
5.	"Weapon" (featuring Baum)	Grant	3:08
6.	"Outbreak" (featuring Mylk)	Feint	3:52
7.	"Apex"	Vicetone	2:43
8.	"Collisions"	Droeloe	2:27
9.	"Call Me"	Subtact	4:02
10.	"Break Me" (featuring Karra)	Trivecta	2:27
11.	"Drift Away"	Wrld	4:02
12.	"Wake Up, You're Dreaming"	Notaker	4:18
13.	"All Me"	Conro	3:23
14.	"Skyforth"	Ephixa	3:20
15.	"Play to Win" (featuring Holly Drummond)	Rameses B	4:18
16.	"Drop It"	Aero Chord	3:07
17.	"0202"	Eminence	3:15
18.	"Twilight"	Zero Hero	3:24
Total length:			62:39

Rocket League x Monstercat Vol. 2
No.	Title	Artist	Length
1.	"My Love"	Koven	3:48
2.	"What Are You Waiting For"	Stonebank	4:15
3.	"Party Freaks" (featuring Anna Yvette)	Pegboard Nerds	3:33
4.	"Flow"	Slippy	3:49
5.	"New Horizons"	Protostar	3:13
6.	"Truth and Malice"	Intercom	4:32
Total length:			23:10

Rocket League x Monstercat Vol. 3
No.	Title	Artist	Length
1.	"Glide"	Stephen Walking	3:16
2.	"Shiawase"	Dion Timmer	3:37
3.	"Silhouette" (featuring Skyelle)	Bad Computer	4:24
4.	"Keep You" (featuring Sundial)	Duumu	3:37
5.	"Hours"	Soupandreas; Inverness	3:02
6.	"About U"	Aiobahn; Vin	2:55
Total length:			20:51

Rocket League x Monstercat Vol. 4
No.	Title	Artist	Length
1.	"Horsepower"	Muzz	4:51
2.	"Walking on the Moon"	Infected Mushroom	5:36
3.	"Burning Up"	Darren Styles; Gammer; Dougal	3:15
4.	"Fly"	Tokyo Machine	3:17
5.	"Charge"	Bossfight	3:23
6.	"Contra" (featuring Sara Skinner)	Pixel Terror	3:58
Total length:			24:40

Rocket League x Monstercat Vol. 5
No.	Title	Artist	Length
1.	"Badlands"	Rogue	3:18
2.	"Castaway"	Grant	3:18
3.	"Runnin'" (featuring Nick Smith)	Smle	2:56
4.	"Oh You"	Rootkit	3:05
5.	"Expedition"	Hyper Potions; Nokae	4:47
6.	"From Here"	CloudNone	3:20
Total length:			20:44

Rocket League x Monstercat – Legacy
No.	Title	Artist	Length
1.	"Rock It" (VIP)	Tokyo Machine	3:15
2.	"Silhouette" (Feed Me Remix) (featuring Skyelle)	Bad Computer	5:01
3.	"From Here" (Attlas Remix)	CloudNone	5:27
4.	"Shiawase" (VIP)	Dion Timmer	3:01
5.	"Outbreak" (Fox Stevenson Remix) (featuring Mylk)	Feint	3:48
6.	"Horsepower" (F.O.O.L and Tokyo Rose Remix)	Muzz	3:20
7.	"What Are You Waiting For" (VIP)	Stonebank	4:59
8.	"Walking on the Moon" (Bad Computer Remix)	Infected Mushroom	3:09

Rocket League x Monstercat Vol. 6
No.	Title	Artist	Length
1.	"Play"	Tokyo Machine	3:03
2.	"Internet Boy" (featuring Micah Martin)	Dion Timmer	3:18
3.	"Each Other" (featuring Eric Lumiere)	Notaker	3:19
4.	"Wishes"	Grant and McCall	4:01
5.	"Hot"	Fwlr	2:50
6.	"The Darkness"	Xilent	4:25
7.	"Us"	Snavs	3:04
8.	"Color" (featuring Juneau)	Grant	3:33
9.	"Amnesia"	Pixel Terror	3:45
10.	"No Fear Anymore"	Julian Calor and Ava Silver	3:22

Rocket League x Monstercat Vol. 7
No.	Title	Artist	Length
1.	"The One"	Habstrakt	3:50
2.	"Heat Wave"	Tony Romera	3:46
3.	"Cobra"	Tails and Juelz	3:12
4.	"Blinded"	Duumu	3:59
5.	"Bloom"	Throttle	4:53
6.	"Test Me"	Slushii and Dion Timmer	3:04
7.	"I'll Go"	Direct and Park Avenue	4:21
8.	"Mark Twain"	Half an Orange	2:49
9.	"Still"	Glacier	3:27
10.	"Only You"	Dexter King and Alexis Donn	3:13

Rocket League x Monstercat – Radical Summer
No.	Title	Artist	Length
1.	"Hang Up" (featuring Savoi)	Wrld	3:19
2.	"Dads in Space"	Stephen Walking	4:09
3.	"Neon"	Televisor	4:15
4.	"Mirai Sekai Part 3: Aeon Metropolis"	Varien and 7 Minutes Dead	3:55
5.	"If I Could" (featuring Beth Cole)	Tut Tut Child	3:15
6.	"Sundance"	Ephixa and Heartful	3:13
7.	"Let's Talk"	Rogue	3:50
8.	"Carissa"	Desert Star	2:25
9.	"Playing with the Boys" (featuring Alli Simms)	Half an Orange	3:28

== Usage ==
The soundtrack to Rocket League plays on the game's title screen and menus through an in-game radio branded as "Rocket League Radio" in patch notes and promotional material. Music during matches have been the subject of internal debate at Psyonix; the studio did not consider such a feature after player research on Rocket League's prequel, Supersonic Acrobatic Rocket-Powered Battle-Cars found that the in-game music would often be disabled or replaced by music not associated with the game chosen by players. The studio initially chose to focus the player's attention towards the sound design, much like other sports games, in order to avoid a reliance on the soundtrack for excitement, as opposed to "building the crowd and ambient sounds". The positive reception from players towards the Rocket League soundtrack, however, influenced Psyonix to later allow players to play music while in a game and/or in training. Upon the game's release in July 2015, a random selection of songs in the game were cycled in the menus. This was changed in September 2015, when the function to skip to another track was added. The option to toggle specific playlists was added in July 2017, allowing players to play specific albums and playlists.

== Reception ==
Reception towards Ault and Hollywood Principle's soundtrack from players have been positive. In a review for Business Insider, Ben Gilbert cites the soundtrack as a contributor to the game's feel of a "madman's vision for future soccer." The soundtrack also gained favorable notes from USgamer's Jaz Rignall and PlayStation Universe's Neil Bolt in their respective reviews for Rocket League, describing it as "upbeat" and well fitting in the game. Ault had personally noted the positive reaction to the soundtrack and was surprised by how well it was received, despite the fact that most of the tracks were produced years prior in different contexts and not necessarily for a video game such as Rocket League. Ault credits the soundtrack's accessibility and the appeal of the EDM genre to the game's player base as possible factors in the soundtrack's success. Positive feedback towards Hollywood Principle's "Firework", a track added in the Supersonic Fury DLC, inspired Ault and Psyonix to reach out to other artists to keep a theme of new, "fresh" music for future DLCs and major feature updates for Rocket League. Artists that were featured on the Rocket League soundtrack have seen varying degrees of commercial success. After producer Drunk Girl's "Don't Stop the Party" was added to the game's soundtrack, his followers on Spotify increased from 500 to 60,000.
