= Nitro Fun =

Mexican electronic music producer

Background information
- Born: Gustavo Rangel; 1998 (age 27–28)
- Origin: San Luis Potosí, San Luis Potosí, Mexico
- Genres: Complextro; Chiptune; Dubstep; Electro house; Future bass; Glitch hop; Indie dance; Moombahton; Powerhouse; Progressive house; Trap
- Instrument: Digital Audio Workstation (DAW)
- Years active: 2013–present
- Labels: Dim Mak; Monstercat; The Arcanium; Wolf Music

Gustavo Rangel (born 1998) bka Nitro Fun is a Mexican electronic music producer. He is well known for incorporating video game sounds into his music.

== Career (2014-present) ==
Rangel was raised in San Luis Potosí, Mexico. At age 15, his first record on Monstercat was a remix contest he won for Televisor's "Old Skool" on Monstercat in 2013. In 2014 and 2015, Nitro Fun primarily released several consecutive singles in Electro house and Progressive house (in 128 bpm) with video game themed titles such as "New Game", "Soldiers", "Cheat Codes", "Turbo Penguin" (in collaboration with Sound Remedy), and "Final Boss".

In 2016, Nitro Fun also released tracks in what he calls the "Powerhouse" subgenre: A subgenre containing the same Four on the floor beat pattern in house music but playing at 140 beats per minute. Two songs, in particular, were his 2016 single, with Hyper Potions, to release "Checkpoint" and his 2017 single "Home". Checkpoint, in particular conveys "feeling like [one is] in the seat of a [car], speeding around corners with no hesitation at what is in front".

== Artistry ==
Prior to becoming Nitro Fun, Rangel initially did not get as much traction because he was focused on sounding like Skrillex and Porter Robinson. By 2013, Nitro Fun decided to incorporate chiptune sounds from video games into his tracks.

== Personal life ==
Prior to focusing most of his time towards producing music, Rangel was an avid video gamer. His favorite video game series were Pokémon, The Legend of Zelda, and Grand Theft Auto.

== Discography ==
=== Extended plays (EPs) ===
Title	Tracklist	Details
Closure	1. go 4 it 2. leaders (with Glacier & LoneMoon); 3. keygen (with Trinergy)	Released: January 11, 2018; Label: The Arcanium; Format: Digital download

=== Singles ===
Year	Title	Album	Label
2014	New Game	Non-album singles	Monstercat
2014	Cheat Codes	Non-album singles	Monstercat
2014	Soldiers	Non-album singles	Monstercat
2014	Turbo Penguin (with Sound Remedy)	Non-album singles	Monstercat
2014	Safe & Sound (featuring Danyka Nadeau)	Non-album singles	Monstercat
2014	Believe (with Desso featuring Brenton Mattheus)	Non-album singles	Wolf Music
2015	Final Boss	Non-album singles	Monstercat
2015	Come With Me (with Subtact)	Non-album singles	Monstercat
2016	Checkpoint (with Hyper Potions)	Non-album singles	Monstercat
2016	Break The Silence (with Richard Caddock, WRLD, Slippy, and Subtact)	Monstercat 5 Year Anniversary	Monstercat
2017	Home	Non-album singles	Monstercat
2017	Cheat Codes VIP	Non-album singles	Monstercat
2018	Time Goes By	Non-album singles	Monstercat
2020	Killswitch (with Justin OH)	Non-album singles	Monstercat
2021	Easter Egg	Monstercat 10 Year Anniversary	Monstercat
2022	Push It (with Slushii and Bok Nero)	Non-album singles	Dim Mak Records
2023	Call Me Up (featuring Namelle)	Non-album singles	Dim Mak Records
2023	Chase Me (featuring Linney)	Non-album singles	Dim Mak Records
2023	Fight (Show Me Who You Are) (with Britt Lari)	Non-album singles	Dim Mak Records
2024	World Wide Web	Monstercat - Best of 2024	
2024	POWER	Rocket League x Monstercat	
2026	if you wanna love me (with dnvn & Nito-Onna)	Non-album singles	

=== Remixes ===
Date	Original Artist	Title	Label
2013	Televisor	Old Skool	Monstercat
2015	Disco Fries	Ramuh	Liftoff Recordings
2015	Porter Robinson	Flicker	Sample Sized/Astralwerks
