= SMLE =

SMLE may refer to:

- smle (DJs), an American electronic music duo
- Short Magazine Lee-Enfield, a British bolt-action rifle designed by James Paris Lee
