= Stonebank =

British electronic music artist from Peterborough, England, UK

Background information
- Also known as: Modulate; Rocket Pimp
- Born: Michael Stonebank; 17 December 1987 (age 38); Peterborough, England, United Kingdom
- Origin: Peterborough, England, United Kingdom
- Genres: Complextro; Drum and bass; Drumstep; Dubstep; Electro; Electro house; Glitch hop; Hardcore; Happy hardcore; Hardstyle; Moombahcore; Trance; Trap
- Instruments: Digital audio workstation (DAW); Sylenth1
- Years active: 2009–present
- Labels: Big Fish; Dustla; Monstercat; Nerd Nation
- Formerly of: Zero Hero
- Spouse: Marie Louise (aka EMEL) (m. 2017)

Michael Stonebank (born 17 December 1987), better known simply as Stonebank, is an English DJ and electronic music producer. He is well known for his records on Canadian-based electronic music record label Monstercat, for his notability in the UK hardcore genre and scene, and was previously a member of "Zero Hero" along with Darren Styles. Stonebank previously produced under two former aliases: Modulate and Rocket Pimp.

== Early life ==
Stonebank was born and raised in Peterborough, England. While at university studying Graphic design, Stonebank was introduced to FL Studio and initially produced as a hobby, which he then started producing UK hardcore songs.

== Career ==
=== Modulate & Rocket Pimp (2011–2015) ===
During his teenage years, Stonebank grew up listening to the Clubland X-Treme Hardcore compilation series: A series of compilation albums mixed by hardcore producers such as Darren Styles, Mark Breeze, and Hixxy. The series was his primary inspiration to why he initially produced Hardcore music. As "Modulate", his songs were featured starting at the 6th compilation until the 9th compilation.

Rocket Pimp (2013–2015)

Prior to producing under his current alias "Stonebank", he used to produce under two separate aliases: "Rocket Pimp" was for complextro tracks whereas "Modulate" was for any tracks produced at 170 beats per minute, particularly in hardcore. Stonebank made the decision to drop the two-alias act, and produce under the "Stonebank" alias to "release music as he pleases without the pressures of limiting himself to old genre sounds" and to no longer cause confusion for music promoters.

In 2013, Rocket Pimp released a 2-track EP called "Red Mist" on Canadian-based record label Big Fish Recordings. The Extended play (EP) blended "styles of trance with insane face-crushing complextro" and was described as "energetic, dynamic, and absolutely club-stomping".

=== Stonebank (2014–present) ===
In 2014, Stonebank released a single on Monstercat called "Moving On" with EMEL as the featured vocalist. The track was remarked for the vocals, along with, house and electro influences, taking the listener "on a ride full of flawlessly produced twists, turns, and epic drops through the healing process.", and as a way to help the listener "move on from and accept their past mistakes in relationships". One month later, Stonebank released "Holding On To Sound" which blended Moombahcore and Glitch hop. In September, Stonebank released another single called "Step Up" which combined "super-fresh hip-hop verse atop a raw, dark electro beat" while maintaining an "eery theme".

In January 2015, Stonebank released "Stronger" featuring EMEL's vocals. The track was homage to his roots in UK hardcore, and introduced the genre to an American audience. The video, as of January 7, 2026, is Stonebank's most viewed song on Monstercat's YouTube channel with 28 million views and counting. Stonebank released Blast From The Past which was remarked for having a "solid electro with amazing music theory". Two months later, Stonebank released his first EP titled "Monument". The 5-track EP was a reflection of Stonebank's production style of "different genres and showcas[ing] some diversity" due to each track being produced in a different genre.

In March 2017, Stonebank released "Ripped To Pieces" another hardcore track which featured "intense beats, haunting use of strings, and emotion-laden lyrics". One month later, Stonebank collaborated with Darren Styles to release "Us Against The World" that "incorporate[d] emotional lyrics with that infectious and notable uptempo happy hardcore sound". One month later, Stonebank collaborated with Rogue and Slippy to produce "Unity" for Monstercat's Uncaged Vol. 1 Compilation album.

In 2018, Stonebank remixed Haliene's Dream In Color which was a "very dramatic and loud interpretation" of the song where its "opening portion of the track delivers a long, drawn out, and almost orchestral intro".

In 2019, Stonebank collaborated with Gammer to release "Crank Up The Dank" which was a combination of influences from the hardcore, dubstep, and complextro genres that featured "fast-paced rhythm and dark vocals", a "drop... with pulverizing kick and bass that lights up the synths that fly all over the place".

In 2020, Stonebank remixed Infected Mushroom's "Spitfire" from a psytrance into a dubstep track.

In 2021, Stonebank released "Fire" on Monstercat's 10-Year Anniversary Compilation. Originally produced in 2015 and as a work in progress, it was recreated from scratch after a file corruption made the song unrecoverable. Like fitting pieces to solve a puzzle, the track was recreated "from a Facebook video recorded on a phone six years prior, along with earlier project versions to... to complete the song". Two months later, Stonebank collaborated with Pegboard Nerds and EMEL to release "Falling Apart".

== Personal life ==
Stonebank is married to Marie Louise (aka EMEL).

== Discography ==
=== EPs ===
Title	Tracklist	Details
As Rocket Pimp
Stop The Rain	1. Stop The Rain (featuring Marie Louise); 2. Out My Way (featuring Marie Louise); 3. Stop The Rain (VIP Mix)	Release date: April 22, 2013; Label: Dustla; Format: Digital download
Red Mist	1. Red Mist; 2. Dying Inside (featuring Marie Louise)	Release date: May 11, 2014; Label: Big Fish Recordings; Format: Digital download
As Stonebank
Monument	1. Lost Without You; 2. Ready; 3. Finally; 4. Another Day (featuring EMEL); 5. Chokehold (featuring Concept)	Release date: November 27, 2015; Label: Monstercat; Format: Digital download

=== Singles ===
Year	Title	Album	Label
2014	Moving On (feat. EMEL)	Non-album singles	Monstercat
2014	Holding On To Sound (feat. Concept)	Non-album singles	Monstercat
2014	Step Up (feat. Whizzkid)	Non-album singles	Monstercat
2015	Stronger (feat. EMEL)	Non-album singles	Monstercat
2015	Blast From The Past	Non-album singles	Monstercat
2016	Be Alright (feat. EMEL)	Non-album singles	Monstercat
2016	Never Looking Back	Non-album singles	Monstercat
2016	Soldier	Non-album singles	Monstercat
2016	Lift You Up (feat. EMEL)	Non-album singles	Monstercat
2016	The Only One (feat. Ben Clark)	Non-album singles	Monstercat
2017	Droppin' Low	Non-album singles	Monstercat
2017	Ripped To Pieces (feat. EMEL)	Non-album singles	Monstercat
2017	Us Against The World (with Darren Styles)	Non-album singles	Monstercat
2017	Unity (with Rogue & Slippy)	Monstercat Uncaged Vol. 1	Monstercat
2018	Sky Is Falling (featuring EMEL) (with Darren Styles)	Non-album singles	Monstercat
2018	What Are You Waiting For	Rocket League x Monstercat Vol. 2	Monstercat
2019	Crank Up The Dank (with Gammer)	Non-album singles	Monstercat
2021	Fire	Monstercat 10 Year Anniversary	Monstercat
2021	Falling Apart (with Pegboard Nerds & EMEL)	Non-album singles	Monstercat
2022	Welcome To The Club (with Pegboard Nerds)	Non-album singles	Nerd Nation
2022	Falling Apart VIP (with Pegboard Nerds & EMEL)	Non-album singles	Monstercat
2023	Euphoria (with Pegboard Nerds)	Non-album singles	Monstercat

=== Remixes ===
Year	Original Artist	Title	Label
As Rocket Pimp
2010	Hyper Deejays & Jenna C	Follow The Rules	Self-released
As Stonebank
2016	Seven Lions & Echos	Cold Skin	Monstercat
2018	Haliene	Dream In Color	Monstercat
2020	Infected Mushroom	Spitfire	Monstercat
2022	Muzz	Star Glide	Monstercat

=== Production credits ===
- Tiësto, Jonas Blue & Rita Ora – Ritual (2019)

== Live performances ==
=== Music festivals ===
Event
KARNiVAL 2023
Knockout Outdoor 2023
HTID 2024
HTID 2025
Knockout Outdoor 2025
HTID 2026
