= The Promised Land (Muzz album) =

Studio album by Muzz
- Released: 3 September 2020
- Genre: Drum and bass
- Length: 54:12
- Label: Monstercat
- Producer: Mustafa Alobaidi

Muzz chronology
The Promised Land (2020)	The X Saga (2022)

Singles from The Promised Land
- 1. "Nemesis" Released: 28 May 2020; 2. "Start Again" Released: 11 June 2020; 3. "Out There" Released: 25 June 2020; 4. "Somewhere Else" Released: 9 July 2020; 5. "Star Glide" Released: 23 July 2020; 6. "The Warehouse" Released: 5 August 2020

The Promised Land is the debut studio album by English drum and bass producer Muzz. It was released on 3 September 2020 by Monstercat.

The album was marketed with the release of six singles – "Nemesis", "Start Again", "Out There", "Somewhere Else", "Star Glide", and "The Warehouse". It contains guest features from MVE, Cammie Robinson, Bloodhounds, Pav4n of Foreign Beggars, Miss Trouble, Danyka Nadeau and Koven.

== Background ==
Muzz announced the album via a teaser posted to his social media platforms on 21 May 2020.

On 1 September, Muzz premiered the album via a live performance streamed from the Bournemouth International Centre.

== Reception ==
The Promised Land was met with positive reception on release. Matthew Meadow from YourEDM praised the drum & bass musician for staying true to his musical style.

== Track listing ==
No.	Title	Length
1.	"Valhalla" (Intro)	2:36
2.	"Nemesis"	4:34
3.	"Start Again"	4:13
4.	"Out There" (featuring MVE)	5:33
5.	"Born for This"	4:54
6.	"Star Glide" (featuring Cammie Robinson)	5:07
7.	"The Sanctuary"	5:11
8.	"Salvation" (featuring Bloodhounds)	5:14
9.	"The Warehouse" (featuring Pav4n and Miss Trouble)	4:42
10.	"Somewhere Else" (featuring Danyka Nadeau)	6:37
11.	"Catharsis" (featuring Koven)	5:27
Total length:		54:08
