= Xenon Racer =

2019 racing game

- North American cover art
- Developer: 3DClouds
- Publisher: Soedesco
- Engine: Unreal Engine 4
- Platforms: Microsoft Windows, PlayStation 4, Nintendo Switch, Xbox One
- Release: 26 March 2019
- Genre: Racing
- Modes: Single-player, multiplayer

Xenon Racer is a racing video game developed by the Italian developer 3DClouds and published by Soedesco for Microsoft Windows, PlayStation 4, Nintendo Switch, and Xbox One. It was released on 26 March 2019.

== Gameplay ==
Xenon Racer is a racing game set in the year 2030. Players race along courses in seven different world locations using vehicles which, according to the game, have been known to be the last cars with wheels, as the cars have been replaced by flying vehicles.

== Development ==
Early in the game's development, the game had been compared to other racing titles, such as F-Zero, Wipeout, and Fast RMX.

In February 2019, Soedesco announced a partnership with Canadian record label Monstercat to bring some of the label's music library into the game.

== Reception ==
The PlayStation 4 version of Xenon Racer received "mixed or average" reviews, according to review aggregator Metacritic.
