= Varien =

American musician (born 1990)

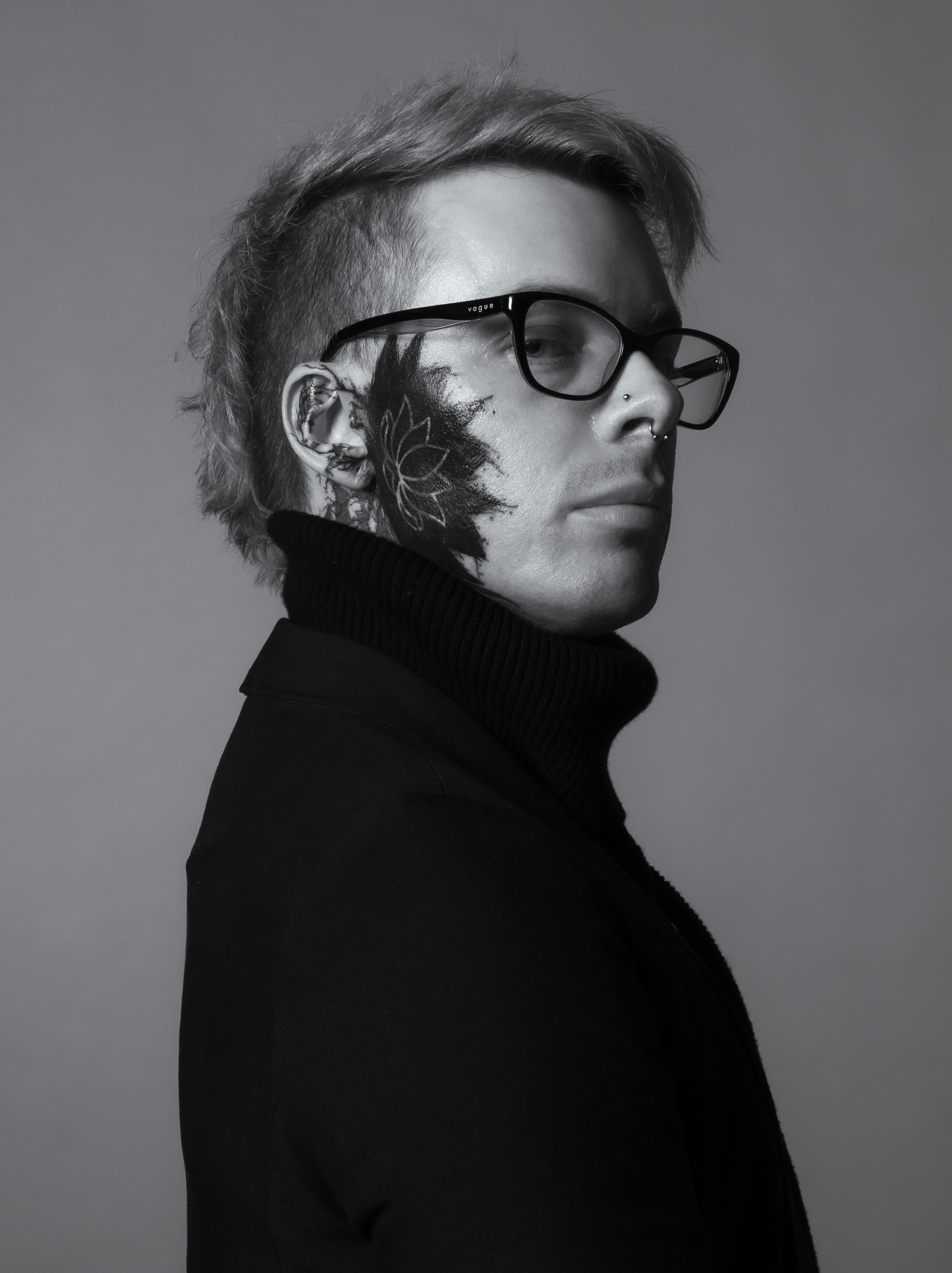
- Kaelar in 2023

Background information
- Also known as: Nick Kaelar; Nikki Kaelar; Chrono Rabbit; Halo Nova; Koinu
- Born: May 15, 1990 (age 36); Tampa, Florida, U.S.
- Genres: Orchestral; electronic rock; industrial; soundtrack; film score; downtempo; electro; chillout
- Occupations: Composer; producer; DJ
- Instruments: Piano; guitar
- Years active: 2011–present
- Labels: Monstercat; Kitsune Soundworks; Ultra; Big Beat; FiXT; Circus; Materia Collective; Firaga Records; Most Addictive
- Website: varien.io

Nikki Kaelar (born May 15, 1990), better known by their stage name Varien, is an American composer, producer, and multi-instrumentalist. Varien has incorporated or experimented with such styles as industrial, metal, orchestral, neofolk, and ambient music. They are known for their work on film soundtracks, along with their unconventional approach to electronic music, including many live instruments not normally found on tracks within their genres.

== Early life ==
Kaelar was born on May 15, 1990, in Tampa, Florida. They had a connection to music from a very young age, and their family supported this passion. At the age of 11, Varien began playing the guitar and attempting songwriting, and they joined a number of bands experimenting with genres of rock, grindcore, metalcore, and jazz. Kaelar developed perfect pitch when playing the keyboard at age fourteen.

Kaelar was in multiple bands in high school, playing grindcore, metalcore, screamo, post-hardcore, and power metal before joining their school's jazz band for two years. They cite these years as pivotal to their artistic development, learning sheet music, jazz theory and improvisation. They also cite this as the time they developed a profound interest in electronic, folk, and metal music.

They decided to focus on solo composition and began producing in 2009, with music in video games serving as their most longtime influence to date. They cite Shin Megami Tensei, Final Fantasy, and Metroid as their biggest influences when it comes to games, as well as the works of the Wachowskis.

== Career ==
=== 2010–13: Career beginnings ===
In August 2010, Kaelar achieved online virality with their slowed-down remix of Justin Bieber's "U Smile", titled "Justin Bieber 800% Slowed Down". They were interviewed by Entertainment Weekly and MTV about the track.

In July 2011, Kaelar released their first Monstercat single "The Force" under the alias Halo Nova. They subsequently released two more singles under the alias before abandoning it and continuing to make music under the alias Varien. One of the first subsequent releases as Varien was a remix of Ephixa's song "Division".

On February 26, 2013, Kaelar released Pick Your Poison Vol. 1, a compilation album of trailer cues that they wrote for the purpose of film, television, and video game licensing. They released a followup, Pick Your Poison Vol. 2, a year later.

=== 2014–16: The Ancient & Arcane and My Prayers Have Become Ghosts ===
In 2014, Kaelar teamed up with Two Steps from Hell on a private trailer cue compilation entitled Open Conspiracy. 2014 saw an abundance of licenses for Varien. Their music was used in trailers and promotional media for 300: Rise of an Empire, Bones, The Purge: Anarchy, Face Off, America's Next Top Model, PlanetSide 2, and Monsters: Dark Continent. Los Angeles-based singer Roniit's song "Runaway", produced by Varien, was used in multiple trailers and TV spots for the film The Loft.

On August 5, 2015, Kaelar released their first LP, titled The Ancient & Arcane, on Monstercat. Prior to this, they had released two tracks, "Beyond the Surface" and "Aether and Light". In an interview with UKF, they elaborated on their songwriting process for the album, saying: "I make so many other types of music so I thought I’d sit down and write – no theme, no story. It’s a very Zen experience. Very spiritual. Wake up. Do yoga. Make music. No regard for the club. No regard for where it will be played or comparisons to my past music or anything else that's going on. I’ve never gone to any of these places I’m exploring right now. I want people to listen to it and think ‘is this Varien?’ Psychedelic, worldly, ethnic, trippy... People have never seen me go there. Yet."

The Ancient & Arcane met with critical acclaim upon release, with EDM website Dancing Astronaut calling it a "cinematic masterpiece", giving particular praise to "Ghost Spores" as "reinvigorat[ing] the soul with its harp-tinged melody and orchestral instruments that once again highlight Varien's idiosyncratic musicianship."

Kaelar's next EP, My Prayers Have Become Ghosts, was released on October 31, 2016, via Monstercat.

=== 2017–2018: Hiatus and return ===
In 2017, Kaelar announced a hiatus from the Varien alias and removed all of their social media accounts. Across two interviews with EDMSauce, they cited the psychological impact of social media as their reason for going on a blackout, also saying they "needed a break from it.". In 2018, Kaelar announced via their YouTube channel that they would continue producing music under the Varien name, after their hiatus had allowed them to "take a deep breath from it all". As of 2018, Varien has released music on their own imprint, Kitsune Soundworks.

In April 2018, Kaelar wrote, arranged, and produced K-Pop group VIXX's lead single for their album Eau de VIXX, "Scentist". The track went on to hit #1 on the Mnet charts and was licensed for Korean television shows like The Return of Superman.

On October 2, 2018, Kaelar was quoted in RPGamer talking about their youth and which RPGs and video games inspired their career as a producer and composer. Kaeler comments that they always knew that they wanted to be a video game composer when they "grew up," and that if the opportunity came to them, they would go for it. They explained in the article, "The thing is video game [composers themselves are], and especially the JRPG community, [are] very much a Fort Knox. There's a limited amount of people and they’re the best."

Alex Fuller from RPGamer commented on Varien's talent, "It's readily apparent how [they have] been able to utilize [their] gaming influences both in [their] electronic music and well as [their] soundtrack creations. It's easy to be able to see the sort of scenes or environments that one would expect from a JRPG while listening to those particular tracks." Varien's collaboration with Materia Collective was mentioned in the interview and the official remix with Undertale is featured.

On October 26, 2018, Varien released their next EP, Death Asked a Question, through Most Addictive Records. | In an interview with EDM Joy, they described the EP as being the physical manifestation of their struggles during their hiatus, in contrast to the "fantastical" narrative of The Ancient & Arcane.

On July 13, 2018, Kaelar is featured in an exclusive EDM Sauce interview talking about direct influences of their work, which includes Y2K Era, Fight Club, The Matrix, BBs forums for Final Fantasy, Rage Against the Machine, A Perfect Circle, Nine Inch Nails, KoRn, and "cool new electronic music like Drum n Bass, Trip Hop, etc," as what they declare as their "favorite era [of music]." The EDM Sauce article features Varien's statement about their 2017 hiatus, declaring that they were being "ground down" by the industry and needed a break from it all. Kaelar stated that they returned with a newly radically and positive mindset surrounded by a community of support and friends. The author, GLU[15], declares, "Varien is an enigma. Creative on levels I don't think we have yet to catch up to; [Nikki] has been building a fan base for years. The Floridian producer effortlessly dominates any genre he touches."

On October 26, 2018, Kaelar released an EP, Death Asked A Question, premiered through EDM website Dancing Astronaut in which Kaelar describes the EP as soul-searching, expressive, personal, raw, and featuring numerous gaming influences. Kaelar also described it as having "so much Metroid it's not even funny!" In the Dancing Astronaut premiere and interview the author, Robyn Dexter, quoted Varien and the newly released EP as "consistently [surpassing] genre constructs and [proving himself] a true mastermind of the electronic music realm."

In January 2018, Varien played at MAGfest, an organization dedicated to the appreciation of games and video game music. On January 1, 2019, featured in Big Shot Magazine, Varien speaks of that performance and describes themselves as being fully "back [from their hiatus]" and that they "felt that feeling of performing again for the first time in so long."

=== 2019–present ===
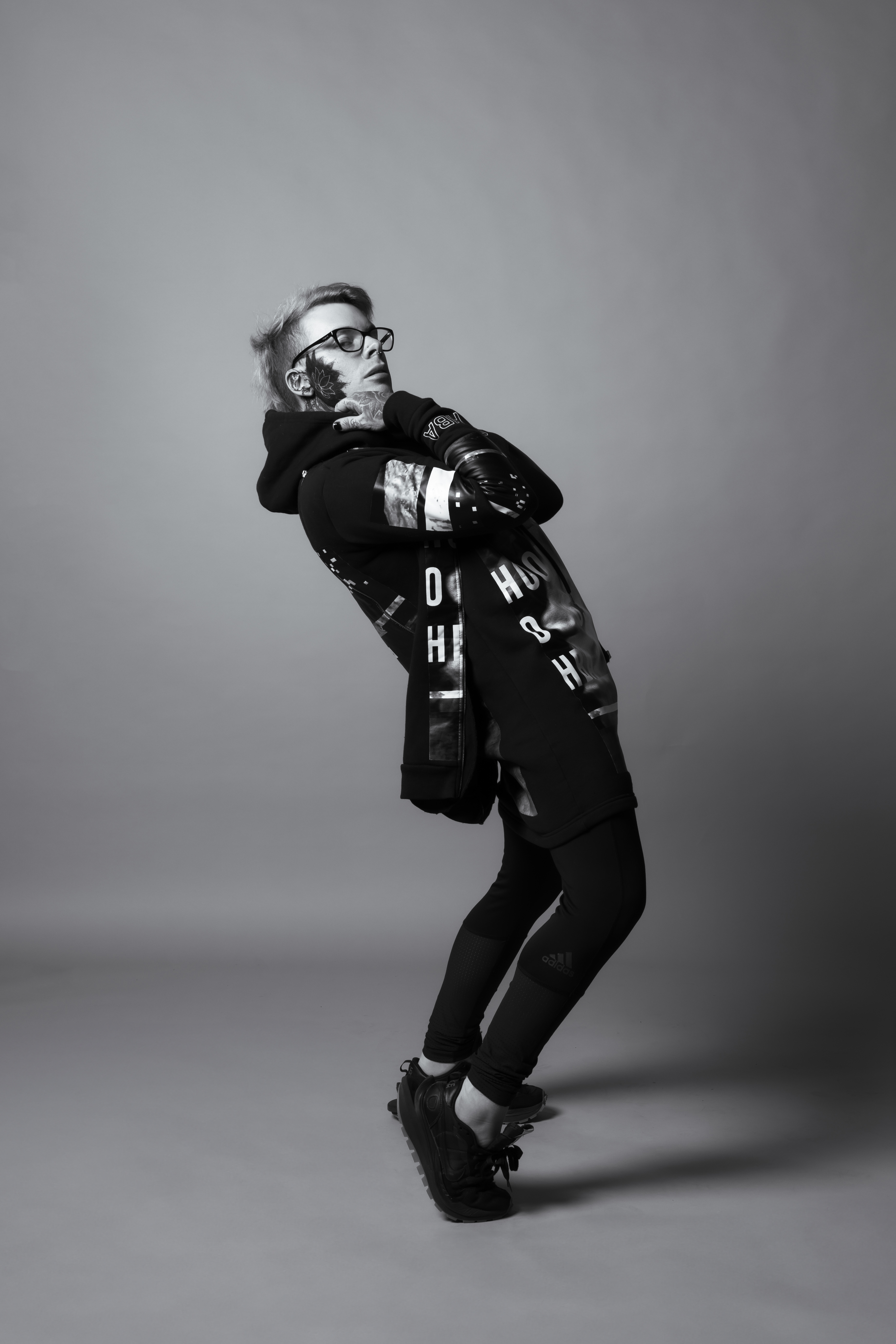
Nikki Kaelar in 2023

On January 1, 2019, in Bigshot Magazine, Kaelar looks back on their 2018 musical highlights throughout the year and reflects,"I’d definitely say landing the VIXX track "Scentist" [in 2018] which went to number one in Korea in April, and then number three in October in Japan. This marked my first official placement in the K-Pop realm of which there is so much more to come. I was credited as producer, songwriter, and arranger.”

Kaelar's next full album release, "The Second Industrial Revolution" was on December 5, 2019. The album was renowned and extolled by critics, and was quoted as being uncompromising, daring and utterly raw. Broadway World Music reviewed the album, "At its essence the album is a celebration of this "imperfect", exalting the artistic beauty and freedom that lies in surrender to that. From the very start of the album, in titular single 'THE SECOND INDUSTRIAL REVOLUTION', there is a grainy, clipping quality to the production this is far removed from the polished normalcy of much of today's electronica, carried through as the album begins its descent into darkness."

Referring to the album, Varien speaks about wanting to connect with their imperfect, marginalized and "weird" audience, saying, "Throw away the shrink wrap and throw yourself into the abyss with me." It was also stated that the album The Second Industrial Revolution was produced "in the pits of [Kaelar's] deepest depression," and "[lifted them] through the dark times" as well as resulted in a physical relocation of Kaelar to the Northern European country of Finland.

The Broadway World Music article also states, "Adored by critics and followed with a feverish, almost cult-like manner by fans, elusive US electronic producer Varien ... continues to push the boundaries of their chosen genres from his position within the shadows of American musical counter culture. [Theirs] is a unique space, flexing across countless areas within music but continually refusing to compromise or dilute his work."

On December 23, 2019, Relentless Beats reviewed the album and stated it to be a complete masterpiece as well as one of their favorite albums of 2019. In the review they stated, "Overall, The Second Industrial Revolution truly blew me away. The transitions from grungy, distorted basses to soft, elegant melodies was effortless and the story lies in these musical parallels. On one hand, the world Varien created was dark and meaningless, yet on the other it was beautiful and full of life." And concluded, "Everything Varien touches seems to turn into gold, no matter the genre."

In 2019, EDM.com described them as "Trent Reznor dark lord of this generation in electronic music". As one of Varien's most prominent features, EDM.com states that Kaelar is "on the same playing field," as Nine Inch Nails frontman Trent Reznor. The articles states, "It's hard to place someone on the same wavelength as Reznor, but Kaelar's Varien moniker has achieved immense success and garnered an unprecedented vision for music, something Reznor accomplished just as flawlessly. Varien is now coming around and finding themselves as musician and artist."

On December 12, 2019, Raver Mag commented on Varien's prominent return to the industry, "After a well-documented ghosting of the music industry, [they] returned just over 12 months and since then have been on what can only be described as a production rampage, releasing not just electronica but also #1 K-Pop hit singles and soundtracks for movies like John Wick 3 and Replicants." Kaelar stated in the interview that when writing The Second Industrial Revolution they drew a lot of their time from writing K-Pop because that's what taught them the mechanics of writing hooks and catchy rhythms.

Kaelar states in the Raver Mag feature that they believe art, poetry, theory, philosophy combined with razor sharp logic, rationality, reasoning, and critical thinking can assist in practical ways of dealing with the world. In the interview, they also state that if they had the choice to bring whoever they wanted to dinner dead or alive, they would choose Lana Wachowski, David Foster Wallace, Chuck Palahniuk, Marilyn Manson, and Brit Marling. They concluded the interview by stating that if they had to be remembered for saying anything, they would want it to be the statement, "That I lived life to its fullest and always dared to try."
