= Sanctuary (Gareth Emery song) =

Single by Gareth Emery featuring Lucy Saunders

from the album Northern Lights
- Released: 8 August 2010
- Recorded: 2009–10
- Genre: Progressive house, vocal trance
- Length: 3:45 (radio edit); 7:27 (original mix); 7:49 (club mix)
- Label: Garuda
- Songwriter(s): Gareth Emery; Mark Frisch; Anthony John Galatis
- Producer(s): Gareth Emery

Gareth Emery singles chronology
"I Will Be the Same" (2010)	"Sanctuary" (2010)	"Citadel" (2010)

"Sanctuary" is a song by trance producer Gareth Emery featuring vocals by Lucy Saunders. It was released on 8 August 2010 by Emery's own record label Garuda. It was voted the 2nd biggest track of 2010 by listeners of Armin van Buuren's A State Of Trance radio show and became the most played record of 2011 on US Sirius XM Radio dance station BPM. Later in 2021, "Sanctuary" was ranked #47 in A State of Trance's Top 1000.

== Sanctuary (The Remixes) ==
On 19 September 2011, a remix extended play of Sanctuary was released, featuring 4 remixes from various artists, including remixes from electronic producers Ben Gold, Paul Thomas & Myke Smith, Miss Nine and Ephixa. Senthil Chidambaram of Dancing Astronaut generally liked the Paul Thomas & Myke Smith Remix, stating "The progressive melody meshed with Lucy Saunders voice creates a spiritual calming feel throughout the entirety of the track". DJMag.com gave the remix EP a 7.5/10, stating:

Sanctuary seemed to be all about its super-contagious chorus. Ben Gold's remix challenges that by strongly emphasising and amping up its angular lead-line. Ephixa goes for a twitchy, spasmodic bit of dubstep-ery, which is ok, of the type. Miss Nine's charts some straight-up fluffy trance waters with hers, while Paul Thomas & Myke Smith opt for a darker, cooler locale.

== Track listing ==
=== Sanctuary – EP ===
All tracks are written by Gareth Emery, Mark Frisch and Anthony John Galatis.

Digital download – EP
No.	Title	Length
1.	"Sanctuary" (Radio Edit)	3:45
2.	"Sanctuary" (Sean Tyas Radio Edit)	3:25
3.	"Sanctuary" (Club Mix)	7:49
4.	"Sanctuary" (Sean Tyas Remix)	8:14
Total length:		23:13

=== Sanctuary (The Remixes) ===
Digital download – EP
No.	Title	Length
1.	"Sanctuary" (Ben Gold Remix)	6:48
2.	"Sanctuary" (Paul Thomas & Myke Smith Remix)	7:06
3.	"Sanctuary" (Miss Nine Remix)	7:59
4.	"Sanctuary" (Ephixa Remix)	4:49
Total length:		26:40

== Release history ==
Region	Date	Format	Version	Label	Ref.
Worldwide	8 August 2010	Digital download	Sanctuary – EP	Garuda	
Worldwide	19 September 2011	Digital download	Sanctuary (The Remixes)	Garuda	
