= Caitlin Linney =

American singer-songwriter

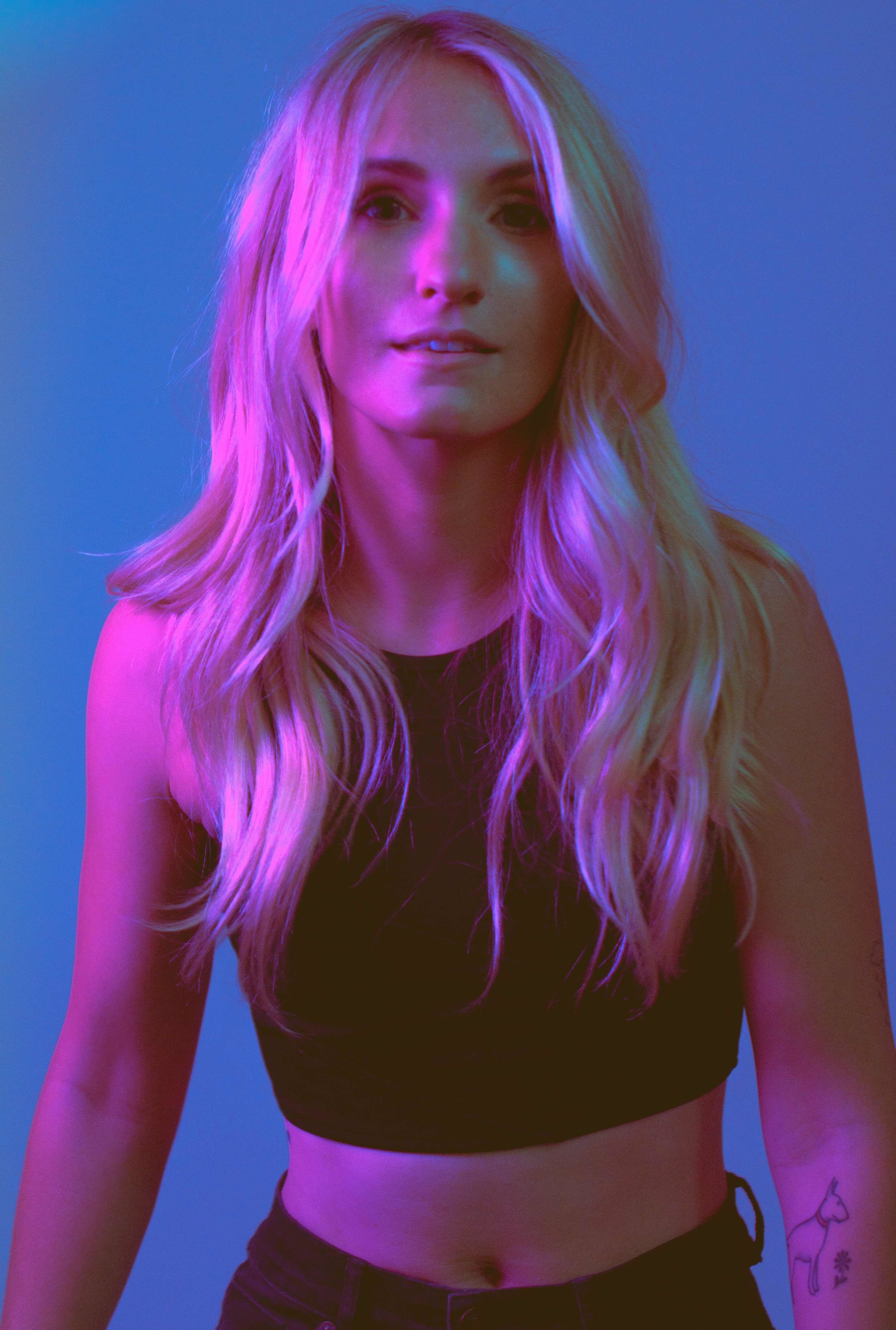
- Linney in 2018
- Born: Caitlin Donerly Linney; Efland, North Carolina, U.S.
- Occupations: Singer; songwriter
- Musical career
- Genres: Pop; dance; electropop; rock
- Years active: 2011–present
- Website: www.linneyofficial.com

Caitlin Donerly Linney (born in Durham, NC), known professionally as Linney, is an American singer and songwriter. Her career began in 2011 with a kickstarter campaign. Since then, she has written and performed multiple songs and won several awards. Her first award was for “best song” at the 28th Annual EVVY Awards. In 2016, she won the John Lennon Songwriting Contest for "Coming Back for More", which led to a performance on the Main Stage at the NAMM Show at the Anaheim Convention Center on January 23, 2016. She has released a studio album and two EPs.

Her single "That Night", which is on her Things We Say EP, has been streamed more than 780,000 times on Spotify. On February 9, 2018, she released her single "Outta My Heart", which Halsey tweeted about.

== Biography ==
=== Education ===
Caitlin graduated from Carolina Friends School in 2007, and from Emerson College in 2011.

=== Musical career ===
In 2013, she won at the Los Angeles Round of the Texaco Country Showdown with KKGO Go Country 105 radio at Knott's Berry Farm.

In 2014, she released the lyric video for "Heartbeat", thanking cardiologists at the Duke Heart Center for saving her father's life.

The following year, Caitlin won the John Lennon Songwriting Contest and performed on the main stage at the NAMM Show. She was also a guest producer on the John Lennon bus in Miami as a part of the John Lennon Songwriting Contest.

== Discography ==
=== Studio albums ===
Title	Album details
Caitlin Linney	Released: 4 December 2012; Label: Self-released; Format: Digital download

=== Extended plays ===
List of extended plays
Title	Album details
Desert Dream	Released: 3 March 2023; Label: Helix Records
Things We Say	Released: 11 March 2016; Labels: Call Me Carolina; Enhanced Music; Evident Music; Format: Digital download
Things We Do	Released: 3 June 2016; Labels: Call Me Carolina; Enhanced Music; Indah Publishing; Format: Digital download

=== Singles ===
Title	Year	Album
"Siren Call" (with COSTA)	2026	Non-album single
"Quiet Of My Mind" (with CloudNone)	2024	Bliss EP (CloudNone)
"Back to Us" (with FRIENDZONE)	2023	Non-album single
"With You" (featuring Morgin Madison)	2023	Desert Dream
"One More Day"	2023	Desert Dream
"Super Human"	2022	Desert Dream
"Garden"	2022	Desert Dream
"Run to the Forest"	2022	Desert Dream
"My Love"	2019	Non-album singles
"famøus"	2018	Non-album singles
"Substance"	2018	Non-album singles
"Gave It All"	2018	Non-album singles
"w/o"	2018	Non-album singles
"The Hurt"	2018	Non-album singles
"Outta My Heart"	2018	Non-album singles
"always"	2017	Non-album singles
"Alone Tonight"	2016	Non-album singles
"Roses"	2016	Non-album singles
"Hi, My Name Is"	2015	Things We Say
"Coming Back for More"	2015	Things We Say
"That Night"	2015	Things We Do

==== As featured artist ====
Title	Year	Album
"Last Time" (Jason Ross featuring Linney)	2024	Divergence EP (Jason Ross)
"The Call" (SABAI & if found featuring Linney)	2023	Non-album singles
"Watch Me" (J. Worra featuring Linney)	2023	Non-album singles
"Roses and Thorns" (MaRLo featuring Linney)	2023	Non-album singles
"Chase Me" (Nitro Fun featuring Linney)	2023	Non-album singles
"We Dance, We Cry" (Sunset City featuring Linney)	2023	Non-album singles
"Something to Luv For" (Callie Reiff featuring Linney and Advokid)	2023	Non-album singles
"Time" (Morgin Madison featuring Linney)	2022	Non-album singles
"Don't Look Down" (MitiS & Ray Volpe featuring Linney)	2022	Non-album singles
"Battlefield" (Ryos & REGGIO featuring Linney)	2021	Non-album singles
"Give Me Life" (DRYM & GXD featuring Linney)	2021	Non-album singles
”Anywhere Tonight” (Dastic, twoDB & Over Easy featuring Linney)	2021	Non-album singles
"Electric Kids" (Tritonal featuring Linney)	2020	Non-album singles
"Remember You" (Project 46 featuring Linney)	2020	Non-album singles
"Yesterday" (Gareth Emery & NASH featuring Linney)	2020	Non-album singles
"Love Runs Out" (Somna & Sheridan Grout featuring Linney)	2019	Non-album singles
"Call to Me" (Aurean featuring Linney)	2019	Non-album singles
"Set Free" (Luke Anders featuring Linney)	2018	Non-album singles
"When the Lights Go Out" (Paris Blohm featuring Linney)	2017	Non-album singles
"Be Alive" (Robbie Rivera featuring Linney)	2016	Non-album singles
"Stardust" (Robbie Rivera featuring Linney)	2016	Non-album singles
"Safe" (APEK, Cuebrick and Breathe Carolina featuring Linney)	2016	Non-album singles
"So Ready" (Noah Neiman featuring Linney)	2016	Non-album singles
"Confetti" (Diego Moura featuring Linney)	2015	Non-album singles
"Unravel Me" (Johan Vilborg featuring Linney)	2015	Non-album singles
"Voices" (APEK featuring Linney)	2015	Non-album singles

=== Cover versions ===
Title	Original artist	Year
"Dizzy"	Tommy Roe	2019
"I Think We're Alone Now"	Tiffany, Tommy James & the Shondells	2019
"Medicine" (with Kurt Hugo Schneider)	Kelly Clarkson	2018
"Tennessee" (live)	The Wreckers	2017
"Come Little Children"	Disney's Hocus Pocus	2017
"Paris"	The Chainsmokers	2017
"Waiting for the End" (with Chase Holfelder)	Linkin Park	2017
"Unsteady" (featuring Anchor and Bell)	X Ambassadors	2016
"This Town"	Niall Horan	2016
"Closer"	The Chainsmokers featuring Halsey	2016
"Higher"	The Naked and Famous	2016
"Roses"	The Chainsmokers featuring Rozes	2016
