= Monstercat 5 Year Anniversary =

Compilation album by Monstercat
- Released: 15 July 2016
- Genre: EDM; Electronic
- Length: 42:52
- Label: Monstercat
- Producer: Various Artists

Monstercat special compilations chronology
Monstercat – Best of 2015 (2016)	Monstercat 5 Year Anniversary (2016)	Monstercat – Best of 2016 (2016)

Monstercat 5 Year Anniversary is a compilation album by the Independent record label Monstercat, released on 15 July 2016 and features ten songs from various artists. The album was announced to celebrate the 5th anniversary of Monstercat, which was founded on 1 July 2011.

== Background ==
Monstercat 5 Year Anniversary was released on 15 July 2016, two weeks after Monstercat's 5th anniversary of the label being founded in 2011. On 18 July 2016, Monstercat released Didrick's 5 Year Anniversary Mix, a compilation song featuring several popular songs released by Monstercat including The Girl by Hellberg, Alone by Marshmello and Stronger by Stonebank.

Monstercat 5 Year Anniversary features 10 songs from various artists including Blackout by Pegboard Nerds, Crescendo by Muzzy (featuring vocals by Mylk), Break The Silence by Richard Caddock, Wrld, Nitro Fun, Slips & Slurs and Subtact and Matches by Stephen Walking and Ephixa (featuring vocals by Aaron Richards). Monstercat 5 Year Anniversary features several recurring artists from previous Monstercat compilation albums including Stonebank, Tristam, and Noisestorm.

== Track listing ==
No.	Title	Music	Genre	Length
1.	"Matches" (featuring Aaron Richards)	Ephixa & Stephen Walking	Indie Dance	3:53
2.	"Lift You Up" (featuring EMEL)	Stonebank	Trance	5:08
3.	"Blackout"	Pegboard Nerds	Electro	3:32
4.	"Divided VIP"	Slippy (Note: At the time of this single's release, Slippy was credited as Slips & Slurs until he changed his alias in 2018.)	Trap	3:32
5.	"Imperfect Views"	Rogue	Electronic	4:02
6.	"This Feeling"	Noisestorm	Electro	4:22
7.	"Tribal"	Laszlo	House	4:44
8.	"Break The Silence"	Keepsake, Wrld, Nitro Fun, Slippy, & Subtact	Future Bass	4:33
9.	"Crescendo" (featuring Mylk)	Muzz	Drum & Bass	4:59
10.	"Before We Fade"	Tristam	Electronic	4:07
Total length:				42:52

== Charts ==
Chart (2016)	Peak position
Top Dance/Electronic Albums (Billboard)	13
