= Muzz (musician) =

English drum and bass producer and DJ (born 1994)

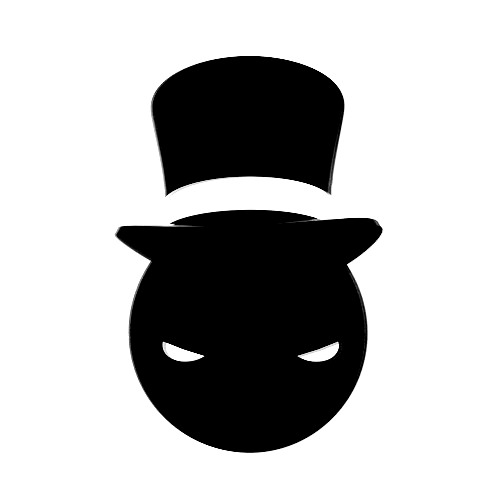
- Muzz's logo

Background information
- Born: Mustafa Alobaidi; 10 November 1994 (age 31); Hampshire, United Kingdom
- Genres: Drum and bass; drumstep; dubstep
- Occupations: Record producer; DJ
- Instrument: Digital audio workstation
- Years active: 2008–present
- Labels: Monstercat; Liquicity Records

Mustafa Ahmed Alobaidi (born 10 November 1994), better known by his stage name Muzz (formerly Muzzy, stylised in all caps), is an English drum and bass producer and DJ. He first gained attention with his release on UKF, "X No Way Out" in 2010 and continues to release music, most predominantly on Monstercat. He has also worked with other labels, such as UKF Music and Liquicity.

== History ==
=== Early years ===
At the age of 11, Alobaidi spent most of his time on computers, learning coding, graphic art and music, later discovering electronic music, inspiring him to become an electronic music producer himself.

Alobaidi took influence from various rock and metal bands as well as early dubstep, ambient, electro, video game music, film scores, orchestral music and various pop artists. In an interview with Toby Reaper of Dancing Astronaut, Alobaidi commented on his experience with music production training, stating:

I’ve never had training and I couldn’t talk to you in depth about scales or music theory, and I sure as hell can’t read or write sheet music. I’ve always written melodies and compositions by ear. It’s funny because I do all that by ear, but then I’ll engineer primarily visually, using analyzers, meters, scopes, etc. I know some very basic music theory but like I said, nothing advanced.

=== 2010–2015 ===
On 20 February 2010, Muzzy released "X No Way Out" on UKF Dubstep. The song was released after all previous songs that he had submitted to Luke Hood (owner of UKF Music) previously were rejected for release, prompting him to create the later accepted song. In an interview with Tabitha Neudorf of UKF about his relationship with UKF, he stated:

I ended up making this crazy dubstep tune; at the time I was about 14/15. At the time the trend in dubstep wasn’t really big on distorted sounds, it was still all about really deep low-end basslines. So I sent him this dubstep tune and he was like ‘yup I love this’. I was like ‘wait what? This was meant to be a joke.’ And he supported it. A lot of big artists after that like Borgore were top of the growly-dubstep game at the time, were hitting me up and they were all like dude I love the direction you’ve taken your sound, you’re killing it.

On 20 February 2013, he released "Concert Crush" on Monstercat. Stevo Jacobs of EDM Sauce described the song as having a pop sounding vibe. On 6 January 2014, he released "Endgame" on Monstercat. Your EDM staff generally liked the song, stating "It’s one crazy ride you’ll want to get back on as soon as it’s done". On 19 September, after an over eight-month hiatus, he released "Insignia" on Monstercat.

On 20 February 2015, Muzzy released "Get Crazy" on Monstercat alongside an extended play of the same name. On 29 June, a remix extended play was released for "Get Crazy", titled "Get Crazy / Feeling Stronger (The Remixes)". On 31 July 2015, he released "Warhead", a collaboration with Droptek, another English music producer with origins in Bristol, on Monstercat. On 18 November, Muzzy released "Calling Out" on Monstercat, featuring Skyelle and KG. Christian of Salacious Sound wrote that the song "'touches on the best of both worlds, combining the heavier, grittier side of Drum and Bass with a hint of Liquid DnB’s ethereal vibes."

=== 2016–present ===
On 6 May 2016, Muzzy released his fifth extended play on Monstercat titled "F Minor Factory". He had earlier teased the extended play by releasing a 360-degree video on YouTube featuring the extended play's album art alongside the Monstercat logo. Salacious Sound's Christian wrote that the extended play is a mix of drum and bass, trap and dubstep, describing it as an "image of an automated, mysterious and dark future, yet bestows an atmosphere which makes you want to throw down- thanks in particular to its drops." In an interview with Toby Reaper of Dancing Astronaut, Muzzy commented on the narrative behind the extended play, stating:

The concept of the EP revolves around a Factory, set far in the future. The factory is controlled by a female artificial intelligence, and there are a bunch of workers (cyborgs/robots) who work at the factory constantly. The first track is about the AI interrogating a cyborg worker called SID, who has been arrested for rebelling against the system. The rules in the factory are clear: “You will work here until your reactors expire. If you do not obey, you will be captured, dismantled, and then incinerated.” SID started recovering more of his human qualities, and as that happened over time, he began to rebel against his static and robotic nature of life, and eventually got captured.

On 14 July, Muzzy released "Crescendo" (featuring vocals by Mylk) as part of Monstercat's 5-year anniversary compilation album. Landon Fleury of Your EDM Generally reviewed "Crescendo", stating "The song is a ridiculous catchy jump-up drum ‘n’ bass banger, which brings on a new sound for Muzzy, but features enough of his production elements to be distinctly Muzzy"

On 17 April 2017, Muzzy released his sixth extended play on Monstercat titled "Spectrum". Cade Berger of EDM.com praised the extended play, stating "'Spectrum' sets out to create that wonderful sound and production value that Muzzy has always been known for and hits all of the targets, it highlights the versatility and creative knowledge Muzzy has gained in his many years as a producer". The extended play won "Best Album/EP" and "Best Original Track" (Spectrum) and Muzzy won "Best Artist" in the Drum n Bass category with 94 participants. On 9 November 2017, he released a collaboration with Koven and Feint titled "Worth The Lie" as part of Monstercat Uncaged Vol. 3.

On 14 May 2018, Muzzy released "The Cascade". An editor for T.H.E Music Essentials praised the extended play, stating that the extended play is "one of his most impressive and intricate creations yet", further stating "The Cascade EP loses none of the hard-hitting impact that Muzzy’s creations are famous for. Yet, it flaunts a sonic landscape so often uncharted by producers of a similar calibre and beyond. Never one to shy away from making a statement with his music, Muzzy has again proved that he is leaps and bounds ahead of the curve when it comes to his art".

On 3 January 2020, Muzzy announced via social media that he was changing his name to Muzz. He released his debut full-length album, The Promised Land, on 3 September.

On 31 March 2022, Muzz released his second studio album, The X Saga, a remix album of eleven Muzz songs. It features remixes from himself and several other artists.

== Discography ==
=== Studio albums ===
| Title | Details |
|---|---|
| The Promised Land | Released: 3 September 2020; Label: Monstercat; Format: Digital download |
| The X Saga | Released: 31 March 2022; Label: Monstercat; Format: Digital download |

=== Extended plays ===
| Title | Details |
|---|---|
| Letz Rock | Released: 8 October 2012; Label: Monstercat; Format: Digital download |
| The Takeover | Released: 28 October 2013; Label: Monstercat; Format: Digital download |
| Get Crazy | Released: 20 February 2015; Label: Monstercat; Format: Digital download |
| F Minor Factory | Released: 6 May 2016; Label: Monstercat; Format: Digital download |
| Spectrum | Released: 17 April 2017; Label: Monstercat; Format: Digital download |
| The Cascade | Released: 14 May 2018; Label: Monstercat; Format: Digital download |

=== Singles ===
==== As Muzzy ====
| Title | Year | Album | Label |
|---|---|---|---|
| "X No Way Out" | 2010 | Non-album singles | Self-released |
| "The Destroyer" | 2011 | Non-album singles | Self-released |
| "Riding the Storm" | 2011 | Non-album singles | Monstercat |
| "Dust Devil" | 2011 | Non-album singles | Monstercat |
| "Kill the Silence" | 2012 | Non-album singles | Monstercat |
| "Black Magic" (with Day One) | 2012 | Non-album singles | Monstercat |
| "Paperchase" | 2012 | Non-album singles | Monstercat |
| "Letz Rock" | 2012 | Letz Rock | Monstercat |
| "Shank" | 2012 | Monstercat – Trick or Treat | Monstercat |
| "Snowman Swag" | 2012 | Monstercat Christmas Album 2012 | Monstercat |
| "Concert Crush" | 2013 | Non-album singles | Monstercat |
| "The Phantom" (featuring High Maintenance) | 2013 | The Takeover | Monstercat |
| "Timberwolf" | 2013 | The Takeover | Monstercat |
| "Endgame" | 2014 | Non-album singles | Monstercat |
| "Give It To You" (featuring Sanna Hartfield) | 2014 | Non-album singles | Self-released |
| "Insignia" | 2014 | Non-album singles | Monstercat |
| "Lost Metropolis" | 2014 | Non-album singles | Monstercat |
| "Get Crazy" | 2015 | Get Crazy | Monstercat |
| "Get Crazier" | 2015 | Get Crazy / Feeling Stronger (The Remixes) | Monstercat |
| "Warhead" (with Droptek) | 2015 | Non-album singles | Monstercat |
| "Back To You" (with Voicians) | 2015 | Non-album singles | Liquicity Records |
| "Calling Out" (featuring kg & Skyelle) | 2015 | Non-album singles | Monstercat |
| "Junction Seven" | 2016 | F Minor Factory | Monstercat |
| "Crescendo" | 2016 | Monstercat 5 Year Anniversary | Monstercat |
| "Spectrum" | 2017 | Spectrum | Monstercat |
| "Worth The Lie" (with Koven & Feint) | 2017 | Monstercat Uncaged Vol. 3 | Monstercat |
| "New Age" (featuring Celldweller) | 2018 | The Cascade | Monstercat |
| "Photons" | 2018 | Non-album singles | Let It Roll |
| "Horsepower" | 2018 | Rocket League x Monstercat Vol. 4 | Monstercat |
| "Meltdown" (with Protostar) | 2018 | Sequence (Protostar) | Monstercat |

==== As Muzz ====
| Title | Year | Album | Label |
|---|---|---|---|
| "Higher Ground" (with Delta Heavy featuring Cammie Robinson) | 2020 | Non-album singles | Liquicity Records |
| "Nemesis" | 2020 | The Promised Land | Monstercat |
| "Start Again" | 2020 | The Promised Land | Monstercat |
| "Out There" (featuring MVE) | 2020 | The Promised Land | Monstercat |
| "Somewhere Else" (featuring Danyka Nadeau) | 2020 | The Promised Land | Monstercat |
| "Star Glide" (featuring Cammie Robinson) | 2020 | The Promised Land | Monstercat |
| "The Warehouse" (featuring Pav4n & Miss Trouble) | 2020 | The Promised Land | Monstercat |

=== Remixes ===
==== As Muzzy ====
| Title | Year | Original artist(s) | Release |
|---|---|---|---|
| "Make Me Worse" | 2012 | Kings of the City | "Make Me Worse" |
| "Wrong" | 2015 | Kings of the City | "Wrong" |
| "Your Time Is Over" | 2016 | Richy Nix | Fear Me Now |
| "Deep in the Night" | 2017 | Snails and Pegboard Nerds | Deep in the Night (The Remixes) |
| "Incomplete" | 2017 | Aero Chord and Anuka | "Incomplete (Muzzy Remix)" |
| "Eternal and You" | 2019 | Koven | Retrospective |
| "Ghost Train" | 2019 | Knife Party | "Ghost Train (Muzzy Remix)" |

==== As Muzz ====
| Title | Year | Original artist(s) | Release |
|---|---|---|---|
| "Catharsis X" | 2022 | Muzz | "Catharsis X" |
| "Children of Hell X" | 2022 | Muzz | "Catharsis X" |
| "...Ready for It?" (with Skyelle) | 2023 | Taylor Swift | "...Ready for It?" |
