= Smooth McGroove =

YouTube celebrity

- Born: Max Gleason; December 5, 1984 (age 41); Oklahoma City, Oklahoma, U.S.
- Occupations: YouTuber; singer

YouTube information
- Channel: Smooth McGroove
- Years active: 2012–present
- Genres: Music; a cappella
- Subscribers: 2.7 million
- Views: 671 million
- Last updated: October 21, 2025

Max Gleason, better known by his stage name, Smooth McGroove, is an American YouTuber known for recording re-arranged a cappella versions of video game music. He typically appears in his videos in a Hollywood Squares-like split-screen featuring multiple versions of himself singing and beatboxing all the parts simultaneously, often complemented by a video of the relevant game being played.

== Career ==
Gleason's musical career began when he was eleven years old and began playing the drums. He eventually started teaching private music lessons to support himself. In college, Gleason began recording some MIDI tracks and posting them on MySpace, but never got much recognition for them. Later, he and some friends of his started a rock band, and in addition to being the drummer, he was responsible for the audio mixing. The band fell apart, and a few years later, Gleason decided to do more music. He began rapping about video games, and he gradually moved to a cappella music.

Gleason has recorded music from many popular video game series, including The Legend of Zelda, Super Mario, Sonic the Hedgehog, Final Fantasy, Mega Man, Undertale and Street Fighter. Gleason's videos have garnered millions of views, and he eventually left his job giving private music lessons to focus fully on his a cappella videos. When asked about working with more modern tracks, he sided against it, stating that "music for video games today serve a more atmospheric role with less of a focus on memorable melodies". He noted that the Elder Scrolls series was an exception.

A Starbound patch known as "v. Enraged Koala" released in early 2014 added a microphone feature including sounds by Gleason.

In 2014, Gleason provided narration for an episode of the video game webseries Did You Know Gaming? covering the F-Zero series.

Gleason's cover of the "Gardens" theme from the 2008 video game LittleBigPlanet was included in the 2014 sequel LittleBigPlanet 3 under the title "Secret Gardens".

Across 2019 and 2020, Gleason was dealing with personal medical problems and had shut down his Patreon and produced no content, but returned to production of his a cappella covers in March 2021.

== Personal life ==
Gleason was born in Oklahoma City, Oklahoma, and was raised in Yukon, Oklahoma. As of 2013, he lived in Oklahoma City with his cat, Charl. Charl was a black cat who, until his death, made appearances in every single one of Gleason's videos since early 2013. Charl died on 30 April 2025 at the age of 14.
