= Smle (DJs) =

American electronic music duo

- Origin: Miami, Florida, United States
- Genres: Future bass; futurepop
- Occupations: DJs; musicians; producers
- Instrument: Digital audio workstation
- Years active: 2014–present
- Labels: Deadbeats; Lowly Palace; Monstercat; The Bearded Man; Armada
- Members: Ruben Alberto Cardenas; Lewis Robert Martinee
- Website: smlemusic.com

Smle (stylized in lowercase) is an American electronic music duo consisting of Ruben Cardenas and Lewis Martinee. They are best known for their remix of Bobby Rush's song "Funk O'De Funk", for which they were nominated for the Best Remixed Recording award at the 60th Annual Grammy Awards.

== Discography ==
=== Extended plays ===
Title	Details
Reasons To	Released: September 8, 2015; Label: SMLE; Format: Digital download, CD

=== Singles ===
Title	Year	Album
"6 A.M." (with Lookas)	2014	Non-album singles
"Everyday"	2016	Non-album singles
"Halo" (featuring Helen Tess)	2016	Non-album singles
"Overflow" (featuring Helen Tess)	2017	Non-album singles
"Stranded" (with WRLD featuring Kiddo Al)	2017	Non-album singles
"Leave It All" (featuring Calica)	2017	Non-album singles
"Happiness" (featuring Helen Tess)	2017	Non-album singles
"Bym" (with Fareoh)	2017	Non-album singles
"2 Me" (featuring Kiddo Al and Nick Smith)	2018	Non-album singles
"Bad Idea" (featuring Tzar)	2018	Non-album singles
"Runnin" (featuring Nick Smith)	2018	Non-album singles
"Weightless" (featuring Nick Smith)	2020	Non-album singles
"Eternal" (with Athena)	2021	Non-album singles

== Awards and nominations ==
=== Grammy Awards ===
Year	Nominee / work	Award	Result
2018	"Funk O'De Funk" (Smle Remix)	Best Remixed Recording	Nominated
