= Playing With Sound =

British record label

- Parent company: Ameritz Music Ltd
- Founded: 2015
- Founder: David Green
- Status: active
- Genre: alternative rock, pop rock, rock
- Country of origin: United Kingdom
- Location: Warrington
- Official website: www.playingwithsound.net

Playing With Sound is an independent record label founded by David Green. Based in the North West of England, PWS are committed to finding upcoming UK talent.

== See also ==
- List of record labels
