= Aero Chord =

Greek electronic trap producer (born 1991)

- Born: Alexandros Vlastaras; 8 November 1991 (age 35); Athens, Greece
- Origin: Los Angeles, California
- Genres: EDM; trap; dubstep; house
- Occupations: DJ, record producer
- Years active: 2011–present
- Labels: High Intensity; NoCopyrightSounds; Bonerizing; Monstercat

Alexandros Vlastaras (Greek: Άλεξ Βλασταράς; born 8 November 1991), commonly known by his stage name Aero Chord, is a Greek electronic trap producer. He is mostly known for his songs within the trap genre, but has also delved into other hybrid music genres such as dubstep, progressive house, electro, and trance.

== History ==
Vlastaras began his career in 2011. In his interview in 2013 with Your EDM, he spoke on the origins of the name Aero Chord, stating "Well, my name wasn't something easy to decide on. It took me at least 2 months of looking through name generators and combining their outputs endlessly until something good and meaningful and unique came up. When I saw Aero Chord it just clicked I guess."

Speaking on the beginning of his career, he stated "I started producing at the age of 14 I think, inspired by a cousin of mine who was making Goa and psy-trance back then and who helped me through my first steps with Reason. I've never DJ'ed much in my life before Aero Chord, I just knew I have to go through productions first to gain some recognition so I saw no point in it."

== Career ==
Vlastaras has released his music on Monstercat, High Intensity, Trap and Bass and other record labels.

Having performed in festivals including Spring Awakening and Carnival of Bass, he started his first North America tour in June 2015.

Vlastaras' track "Surface" was popularized by YouTube introduction video templates, entertainment videos by various YouTube personalities and the Need for Speed gameplay demo at the Electronic Entertainment Expo 2015, gaining over 50 million views on YouTube as of 30 July 2018. Other tracks including "Ctrl Alt Destruction", "Boundless" and "Break Them" are also frequently used in various YouTube videos.

In September 2016, Aero Chord released his first EP, The Love & Hate EP, containing 5 songs, one of which, The 90s, made the Monstercat BO:2016 list. After just under 3 years, Aerochord released his 2nd and final EP with Monstercat, The Sound EP, containing 4 songs, with features of Nevve and Bianca.

In early 2020, Vlastaras released the singles & EP "Technique", "Anthem", "Lambo", "Grind" with his new label "Aero Records".

In 2020, he was dropped by Monstercat after British future house vocalist MYLK accused him of sexual assault in 2014 on her social media account.

In 2021–23, Aero Chord continued to release with Aero Records the EP "V8" and singles such as "Ancients", "love u" and "One More Time".

In October and November 2023, Vlastaras released two singles, "Awake" and "Thunder", with VANA Records.

== Discography ==
=== Extended plays ===
- Mechanical Mayhem (2013, Bonerizing Records)
- New Breed Part 1 (2014, High Intensity Records)
- Love & Hate (2016, Monstercat)
- The Sound (2019, Monstercat)
- Psyops (2022, Aero Records)
- Psyops 2 (2022, Aero Records)

=== Albums ===
- Grind (2020, Aero Records)
- V8 (2021, Aero Records)

=== Singles ===
- "Battle Cry" (2013, self-released)
- "Android Talk" (2013, Dominance Records)
- "No Half Steppin'" (2013, self-released)
- "Ctrl Alt Destruction" (2013, self-released)
- "Mortar" (2013, self-released)
- "Prime Time" (2013, self-released)
- "Time Leap" (2013, NoCopyrightSounds)
- "Shootin' Stars" (with Ddark) (2014, NoCopyrightSounds)
- "Blvde" (2014, self-released)
- "Warfare" (2014, "Album NEW BREED PART 1", High Intensity Records)
- "Chord Splitter" (2014, Album "NEW BREED PART 1", High Intensity Records)
- "Richocher" (2014, Album "NEW BREED PART 1", High Intensity Records)
- "Warrior of the Night" (2014, Album "NEW BREED PART 1", High Intensity Records)
- "Secret" (with Gawtbass) (2014, self-released)
- "Surface" (2014, Monstercat) — #23 on Billboard Twitter Emerging Artists
- "Bouzouki" (2014, self-released)
- "Heart Attack" (2014, self-released)
- "Boundless" (2014, Monstercat)
- "Break Them" (feat. Anna Yvette) (2014, Monstercat)
- "Saiko" (2015, Monstercat)
- "Titans" (with Raizhell) (2015, Monstercat)
- "4U" (2015, Monstercat)
- "Be Free" (with Klaypex) (2015, Monstercat)
- "The 90s" (2016, EP "Love & Hate", Monstercat)
- "Wanchu Back" (2016, EP "Love & Hate", Monstercat)
- "Until The End" (2016, with Fractal feat. Q'AILA, EP "Love & Hate", Monstercat)
- "Gone" (2016, with Tylor Maurer, EP "Love & Hate", Monstercat)
- "Kid's Play" (2016, EP "Love & Hate", Monstercat)
- "Resistance" (2017, Monstercat)
- "Borneo" (with Wolfgang Gartner) (2017, Monstercat)
- "Incomplete" (with Anuka) (2017, NoCopyrightSounds)
- "Incomplete VIP" (with Anuka and DDark) (2017, NoCopyrightSounds)
- "Drop It" (2017, "ROCKET LEAGUE", Monstercat)
- "Shadows" (featuring Nevve) (2018, Monstercat)
- "Confession" (with Kirsten Collins) (2018, self-released)
- "Svnset" (with Norman Perry) (2018, self-released)
- "Play Your Part" (2018, Monstercat)
- "Take Me Home" (featuring Nevve) (2019, Monstercat)
- "Panther" (with Teknicolor) (2019, self-released)
- "Technique" (2020, Aero Records)
- "Anthem" (2020, Aero Records)
- "Lambo" (2020, Aero Records)
- "Grind" (2020, Album, Aero Records)
- "V8" (2021, Album, Aero Records)
- "Secret" (2021, Aero Records)
- "Psyops" (2022, EP, Aero Records)
- "Psyops 2" (2022, EP, Aero Records)
- "Will You Take The Green Herb?" (2022, Aero Records)
- "Beach Drive" (2022, Aero Records)
- "122" (2022, Aero Records)
- "Ancients" (2022, Aero Records)
- "Move" (2022, Aero Records)
- "911" (2022, Aero Records)
- "Who Did the Most" (2022, Aero Records)
- "Thoughts Become" (2022, Aero Records)
- "Ravelogic" (2022, Aero Records)
- "B With Me" (2022, Aero Records)
- "TRVPMAS" (2022, Aero Records)
- "TRVPMAS REMIXED" (2022, Aero Records)
- "BANGER" (2023, Aero Records)
- "Backbone" (2023, Aero Records)
- "Beach Drive 2" (2023, Aero Records)
- "BLUE" (2023, Aero Records)
- "love u" (2023, Aero Records)
- "One More Time" (2023, Aero Records)
- "Awake" (2023, Vana records)
- "Thunder" (2023, Vana records)

==== As featured artist ====
- ShikaP - "Hanattak" (featuring Aero Chord) (2014)

=== Other songs ===
- "Drop It" (2017, Monstercat, Rocket League x Monstercat Vol. 1)

=== Remixes ===
- Knife Party - "LRAD" (2013)
- Televisor - "Old Skool" (2013)
- Dada Life – "Bass Don't Cry" (2013)
- Pegboard Nerds & Tristam – "Razor Sharp" (2013)
- Dada Life – "Arrive Beautiful Leave Ugly" (2013)
- Dada Life – "So Young So High" (2013)
- Diamond Pistols – "Twerk" (featuring Anna Yvette) (2013)
- Alex Balog – "Never Stop" (featuring Edward McEvenue) (2013)
- Bro Safari & UFO! – "Drama" (2014)
- Pegboard Nerds – "20K" (2014)
- Bang La Decks – "Utopia" (2014)
- The Chainsmokers – "Selfie" (2014)
- Krewella – "Live for the Night" (2014)
- Scndl - "The Munsta" (2014)
- The Pitcher – "Savor Time" (2014)
- LeKtriQue and Seek N Destroy – "Atomic" (2014)
- Revolvr and Genesis feat. Splitbreed – "Unstoppable" (2014)
- Excision & Pegboard Nerds - "Bring The Madness" (featuring Mayor Apeshit) (2015)
- Major Lazer x DJ Snake – "Lean On" (featuring MØ) (2015)
- Jack Ü feat. Bunji Garlin – "Jungle Bae" (2015)
- Bro Safari – "Scumbag" (2015)
- GTA - "Red Lips" (featuring Sam Bruno) (2015)
- Above & Beyond – "Fly to New York" (featuring Zoe Johnston) (2015)
- Jessie J – "Burnin' Up" (featuring 2 Chainz) (2016)
- Pegboard Nerds & Nghtmre feat. Krewella - "Superstar" (2017)
- Kodak Black – "Zeze" (2018)
- DJ Snake - "Taki Taki" (2018)
- Angger Dimas - "ANXY" (2024)
