= Monstercat =

Canadian electronic music label

- Parent company: Create Music Group
- Founded: 1 July 2011; 15 years ago
- Founder: Mike Darlington, CEO; Ari Paunonen, COO
- Genre: Electronic dance music
- Country of origin: Canada
- Location: Vancouver, British Columbia
- Official website: www.monstercat.com

Monstercat (formerly known as Monstercat Media) is a Canadian electronic music record label based in Vancouver, British Columbia.

Founded in 2011 by Mike Darlington and Ari Paunonen, the label released regular compilation albums featuring music from various artists, beginning with the release of its first compilation album, Monstercat 001 – Launch Week. Until the release of Monstercat 030 – Finale in 2017, each compilation was given a name and depicted the story of the aforementioned mascot in the album cover. This preceded a rebranding of the label, with a new series of albums titled Monstercat Uncaged. In 2018, Monstercat introduced a new brand titled "Instinct". In 2021, Monstercat acquired electronic label Silk Music to form a third brand titled "Monstercat Silk". The compilations ended the same year with the release of Monstercat Uncaged Vol. 11.

Monstercat has featured many notable artists, including Pegboard Nerds, Vicetone, and Seven Lions. Monstercat has also released soundtrack albums for various video games, including Fortnite, Rocket League and Beat Saber.

One of the label's most successful releases is "Alone", a 2016 song by American DJ Marshmello, which reached Platinum status in the United States and Canada in 2017 and 2018, respectively. The April Fool's Day release of "Crab Rave" by Irish music producer Noisestorm became an internet meme for months after its release.

== History ==
=== Founding (2011–2012) ===
Monstercat Media was founded on 1 July 2011 by Mike Darlington (born 1989) and Ari Paunonen (born 1989/90), two university students from Waterloo, Ontario. The label's YouTube channel, which served as a medium to promote their friends and their music, was created the same day, and began a tri-weekly upload schedule in October. The first song on the label, "Dubstep Killed Rock 'n' Roll" by Ephixa, was released on 4 July 2011.

The team moved to their current offices in Vancouver in 2012 after Darlington and Paunonen finished school.

=== Building the label and first tour (2013–2016) ===
In July 2014, Monstercat surpassed one million in record sales across the label. When asked about the label's model, Darlington said:

People don't need record labels anymore. Artists can do everything on their own. So we either had to do it for them better or provide a platform and marketing tool they can't find on their own. That's where the community concept came for Monstercat. We created a brand that fans can use to discover music and [that] artists can use as a platform for getting their music out there.

In August 2014, Monstercat published a manifesto calling for the reform of copyright law. In it, they described their desire to allow musicians more freedom in sampling other musicians' recordings.

In December 2014, Monstercat launched Monstercat FM as part of live-streaming service Twitch's start in music broadcasting. Monstercat FM is a 24/7 radio station-like Twitch stream featuring many of Monstercat's releases from throughout their history as a label. The launch event for the stream was a DJ set by Monstercat artist Stephen Walking. Monstercat FM was eventually added to YouTube and Microsoft-owned live-streaming website Mixer.

Since 2015, Monstercat has participated in multiple music festivals. One such festival was the Amsterdam Dance Event. Billboard described their 2015 show as "a three-hour mixer outing".

In May 2016, Monstercat signed American producer Marshmello's single, "Alone". Its music video has amassed over 2 billion views combined across YouTube, including a label record 161 million views on Monstercat's YouTube channel As of December 2019. These views contributed to the artist earning $21 million the year after the video's release.

=== Partnerships, awards and evolution (2017–2020) ===
In June 2017, Monstercat partnered with Psyonix to promote the second anniversary of the video game Rocket League by releasing Rocket League x Monstercat Vol. 1, an 18-song album from artists who had previously signed songs to Monstercat, including Slushii, Aero Chord and Vicetone. The album was released on 5 July 2017. Monstercat also announced their own television channel, Monstercat TV, on the Pluto TV television platform the same month.

In July 2017, Monstercat won DJ Mag's Best Breakthrough Label, competing against other labels such as Discwoman, Tuskegee Music, Perspectives Digital and Honey Soundsystem. Monstercat has hosted an annual block party near their headquarters, "Monstercat Compound", since 2017.

In November 2017, Monstercat received the label's first certified platinum record for the 2016 song "Alone" by Marshmello. In an email to Billboard, Mike Darlington expressed his gratitude towards the collaboration and expressed his praise for Marshmello's success.

In December 2017, Monstercat was named one of the five best independent dance labels of 2017 by Billboard.

On the week of 1 January 2018, Monstercat announced a split in branding into two distinct themes, "Uncaged" and "Instinct", citing the diversity of their music library. This was accompanied by the creation of a separate channel, named Monstercat: Instinct. The Instinct brand features music that has a prominent focus on melodic aspects, including genres such as house and future bass. The change included a retirement of the tri-weekly release schedule in favour of a release schedule of four times a week and a podcast episode in-between.

In another first for the label, 9 August saw a collaborative single with Sumerian Records. Called "Kneel Before Me", produced by Slander and Crankdat, and featuring Asking Alexandria, the single was praised across both the electronic and rock music industries.

In September 2018, two weeks before Rocket League x Monstercat Vol. 4 released, Gavin Johnson, Head of Gaming for Monstercat, spoke of the collaboration between the label and Psyonix:

I met Josh Watson (Esports Operations Manager of Psyonix) at one of our Monstercat gaming-driven events during E3 of 2016. Shortly after, Josh introduced me to their Audio Director Mike Ault as he had a vision for how he wanted to approach music in Rocket League which mirrored that of our ethos with Monstercat. During our first call, it was clear that we shared the same desire to build new platforms for exhibiting artists to be on and grow. The groundwork Rocket League x Monstercat Vol. 1 begun immediately afterwards.

In November 2018, Noisestorm's April Fools' Day single, "Crab Rave", entered Billboard's Dance/Electronic Songs chart. The Irish music artist, writing to the magazine, praised its entrance onto the chart, and expressed his approval of its status as an internet meme.

==== Other partnerships ====
In 2019, Monstercat partnered with Dutch video game developer Soedesco to compose music for its video game, Xenon Racer. The game was released on 26 March of that year.

On 14 March 2019, Czech-based indie studio Beat Games released their first paid downloadable content (DLC) song pack for their virtual reality rhythm game Beat Saber for Microsoft Windows and PlayStation 4. The song pack was released as a partnership with Monstercat, titled Monstercat Music Pack Vol. 1. It features a collection of 10 tracks from the record label, including songs from Aero Chord, Pegboard Nerds, Muzzy, Stonebank and Kayzo. The song pack was released for $12.99 USD, (or $1.99 per individual track), with Monstercat offering new subscribers a free month of their Gold Subscription. A crossover music pack with Rocket League was released in November 2019.

In July 2019, to coincide with the label's eighth anniversary, Monstercat announced a partnership with Linden Labs to bring live music experiences into the developer's virtual reality game, Sansar. The collaboration, called the Monstercat: Call of the Wild Experience, began on 12 July, and hosts a live virtual reality alternative to Monstercat's weekly Call of the Wild radio show.

=== Acquisition of Silk Music (2021–2024) ===
On 9 February 2021, Monstercat announced that they had acquired progressive house label Silk Music to form a third brand under the Monstercat label, titled "Monstercat Silk". The brand was promoted to focus on the progressive aspect of electronic music, continuing its signature style of progressive house and trance among similar genres. In the deal, Silk Music director Jacob Henry retained his directorial position with the brand. Silk Music's YouTube channel and social media accounts were rebranded to "Monstercat Silk" alongside the announcement (with Monstercat retaining Silk's 24/7 YouTube streams and the Silk Music Showcase radio show), while Monstercat also announced that with the acquisition, they would be moving to having 6 releases a week, with each brand having 2 releases a week.

On 17 September 2021, Monstercat and Westwood Recordings released an eight-track collaborative compilation album titled Compound 2021, featuring artists such as The Funk Hunters, Kotek, and Defunk. It also coincides with the fourth year of the Monstercat Compound block party after a hiatus in 2020, which took place a day after the release of the compilation.

On 18 August 2023, Monstercat released Gorilla Warfare, the debut album by DJ Diesel (then just Diesel), the stage name of American basketball player Shaquille O'Neal.

=== Create Music Group (2025–present) ===
On 6 May 2025, Darlington and Paunonen sold Monstercat to independent distribution, publishing, and analytics company Create Music Group, with the founders remaining as advisors to incoming president Daniel Turcotte, vice president Orri Sachar, and finance director Rob Hill.

== Key people ==
- Mike Darlington – co-founder
- Ari Paunonen – co-founder
- Daniel Turcotte - president
- Orri Sachar - vice president
- Rob Hill - director of finance
- Jonathan Winter – director of A&R
- Chelsea Shear – Lead A&R
- Conor Systrom – promotional manager
- Gavin Johnson – head of gaming
- Ben Brown Bentley – head of events
- Daniel Turcotte – commercial director
- Jacob Henry – director and founder, Monstercat Silk

== Artists ==
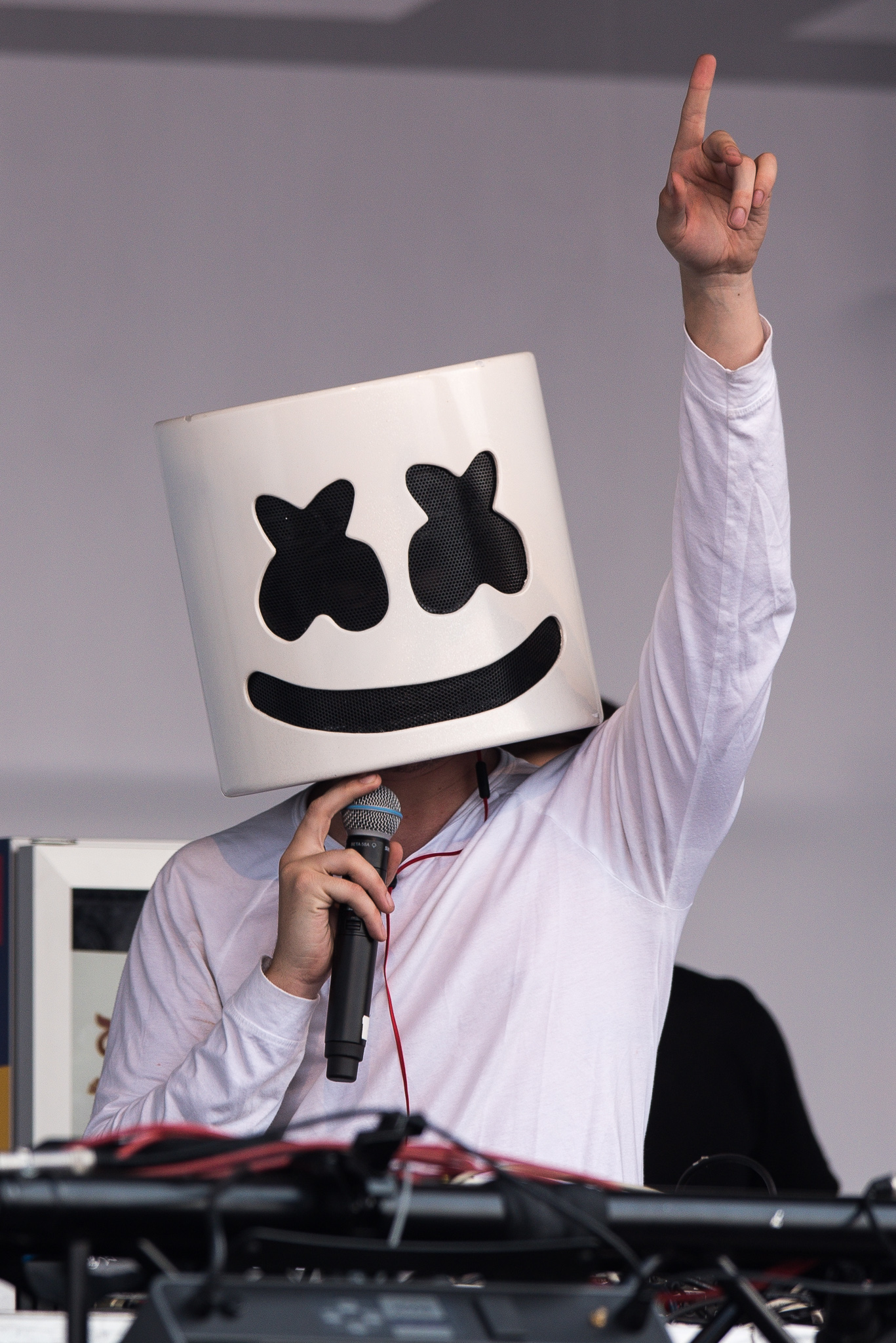
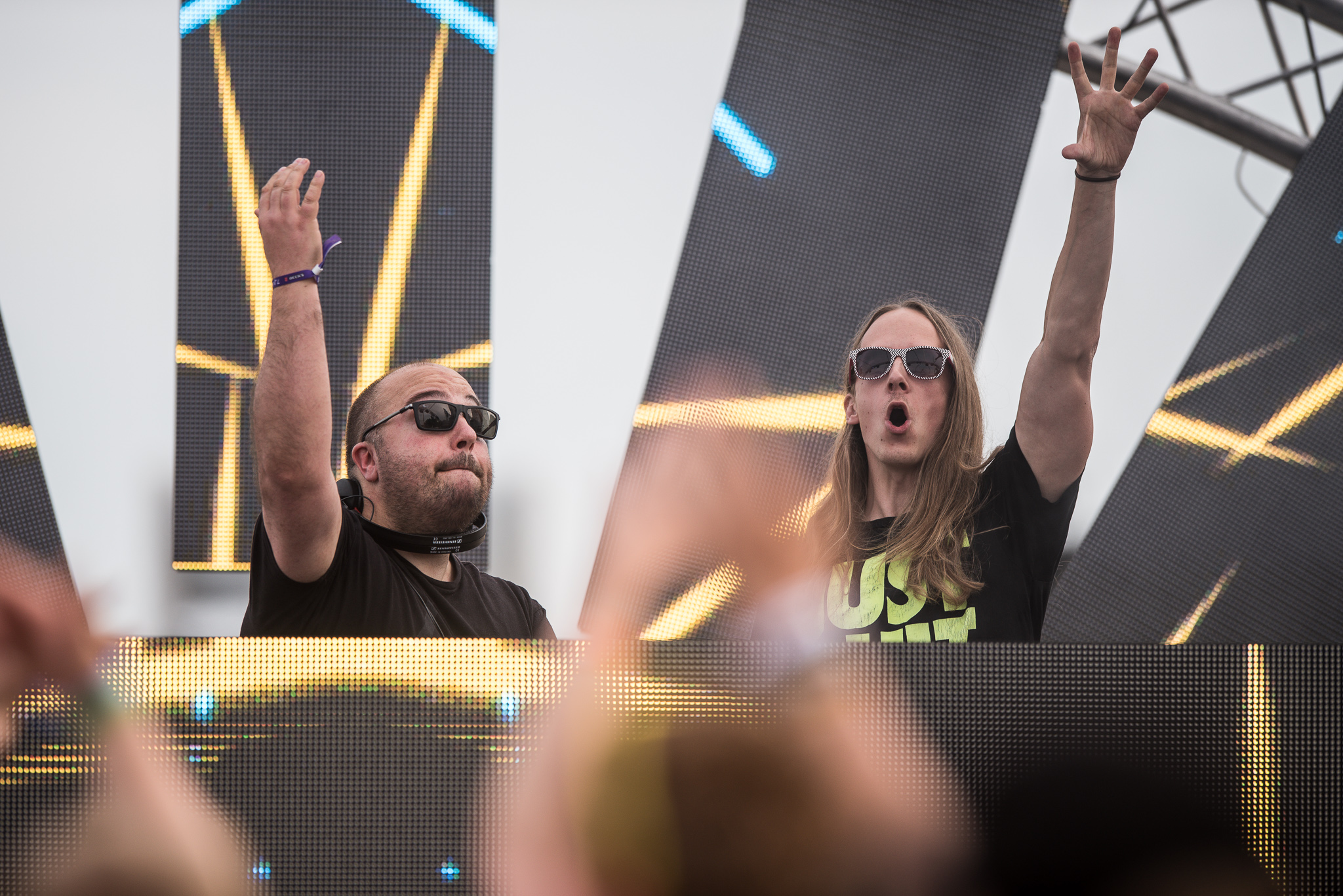
Marshmello (left) and Pegboard Nerds (right) are two of the many artists Monstercat has supported.

Monstercat signs artists on a single-track basis, allowing them to move between labels and brands without an exclusive contract.

== Discography ==
=== Main series compilations ===
- Monstercat 001 – Launch Week (2011)
- Monstercat 002 – Early Stage (2011)
- Monstercat 003 – Momentum (2011)
- Monstercat 004 – Identity (2011)
- Monstercat 005 – Evolution (2012)
- Monstercat 006 – Embrace (2012)
- Monstercat 007 – Solace (2012)
- Monstercat 008 – Anniversary (2012)
- Monstercat 009 – Reunion (2012)
- Monstercat 010 – Conquest (2012)
- Monstercat 011 – Revolution (2012)
- Monstercat 012 – Aftermath (2013)
- Monstercat 013 – Awakening (2013)
- Monstercat 014 – Discovery (2013)
- Monstercat 015 – Outlook (2013)
- Monstercat 016 – Expedition (2014)
- Monstercat 017 – Ascension (2014)
- Monstercat 018 – Frontier (2014)
- Monstercat 019 – Endeavour (2014)
- Monstercat 020 – Altitude (2014)
- Monstercat 021 – Perspective (2015)
- Monstercat 022 – Contact (2015)
- Monstercat 023 – Voyage (2015)
- Monstercat 024 – Vanguard (2015)
- Monstercat 025 – Threshold (2015)
- Monstercat 026 – Resistance (2016)
- Monstercat 027 – Cataclysm (2016)
- Monstercat 028 – Uproar (2016)
- Monstercat 029 – Havoc (2016)
- Monstercat 030 – Finale (2017)

==== Uncaged ====
- Monstercat Uncaged Vol. 1 (2017)
- Monstercat Uncaged Vol. 2 (2017)
- Monstercat Uncaged Vol. 3 (2017)
- Monstercat Uncaged Vol. 4 (2018)
- Monstercat Uncaged Vol. 5 (2018)
- Monstercat Uncaged Vol. 6 (2019)
- Monstercat Uncaged Vol. 7 (2019)
- Monstercat Uncaged Vol. 8 (2020)
- Monstercat Uncaged Vol. 9 (2020)
- Monstercat Uncaged Vol. 10 (2020)
- Monstercat Uncaged Vol. 11 (2021)

==== Instinct ====
- Monstercat Instinct Vol. 1 (2018)
- Monstercat Instinct Vol. 2 (2018)
- Monstercat Instinct Vol. 3 (2019)
- Monstercat Instinct Vol. 4 (2019)
- Monstercat Instinct Vol. 5 (2020)
- Monstercat Instinct Vol. 6 (2020)
- Monstercat Instinct Vol. 7 (2021)

=== Silk Selections ===
- Summer Selections 01 (2014, Silk Royal Records)
- Autumn Selections 01 (2014, Silk Royal Records)
- Winter Selections 01 (2015, Silk Royal Records)
- Spring Selections 01 (2015, Silk Royal Records)
- Summer Selections 02 (2015, Silk Royal Records)
- Spring Selections 02 (2016, Silk Music)
- Summer Selections 03 (2016, Silk Music)
- Winter Selections 02 (2017, Silk Music)
- Summer Selections 04 (2017, Silk Music)
- Silk Music Pres. Autumn Selections 02 (2017, Silk Music)
- Winter Selections 03 (2018, Silk Music)
- Spring Selections 03 (2018, Silk Music)
- Summer Selections 05 (2018, Silk Music)
- Autumn Selections 03 (2018, Silk Music)
- Winter Selections 04 (2019, Silk Music)
- Summer Selections 06 (2019, Silk Music)
- Autumn Selections 04 (2019, Silk Music)
- Winter Selections 05 (2020, Silk Music)
- Spring Selections 04 (2020, Silk Music)
- Summer Selections 07 (2020, Silk Music)
- Autumn Selections 05 (2020, Silk Music)
- Winter Selections 06 (2021, Silk Music)
- Spring Selections 05 (2021)
- Silk Selections 01 (2024)
- Silk Selections 02 (2024)
- Silk Selections 03 (2025)

=== Rocket League x Monstercat series ===
- Rocket League x Monstercat Vol. 1 (2017)
- Rocket League x Monstercat Vol. 2 (2018)
- Rocket League x Monstercat Vol. 3 (2018)
- Rocket League x Monstercat Vol. 4 (2018)
- Rocket League x Monstercat Vol. 5 (2018)
- Rocket League x Monstercat – Legacy (2020)
- Rocket League x Monstercat Vol. 6 (2020)
- Rocket League x Monstercat Vol. 7 (2020)
- Rocket League x Monstercat – Radical Summer (2020)

=== Annual compilations ===
- Best of 2011 (2012)
- Best of 2012 (2013)
- The Best of 2013 (2014)
- Best of 2014 (2015)
- Best of 2015 (2016)
- Best of 2016 (2016)
- Best of 2017 (2017)
- Best of 2018 (2018)
- Best of 2019 (2019)
- Best of 2020 (2020)
- Best of 2021 (2021)
- Best of 2022 (2022)
- Best of 2023 (2023)
- Best of 2024 (2024)

=== Other select compilations ===
- Monstercat 5 Year Anniversary (2016)
- Monstercat 8 Year Anniversary (2019)
- Monstercat - 9 Year Anniversary (2020)
- Monstercat 10 Year Anniversary (2021)
- Compound 2021 (2021)
- Monstercat x Hospital Records (2025)

== Accolades and awards ==
Year	Organization	Recipient(s)	Category	Result
2017	DJ Mag	Monstercat	Best breakthrough label	Won
2017	EDM Sauce	Monstercat	Best record label	Won
2017	Dancing Astronaut	Monstercat	Label Of The Year	Won
2017	Billboard	Monstercat	Best Independent Dance Label	Contained
2017	EDM Sauce	Call of the Wild	Best Radio Show	2
2018	Billboard	Monstercat	Best Independent Dance Label	Contained
2019	International Dance Music Awards	Monstercat	Best Label	Won
2019	International Dance Music Awards	Monstercat	Best YouTube Channel	Nominated
2019	International Dance Music Awards	Call of the Wild	Best Podcast/Radio Show	Nominated
2024	Electronic Dance Music Awards	Monstercat	Label of the Year	Nominated
