= Hot lava =

Hot lava or Hot Lava may refer to:

- Molten lava, molten rock expelled from the interior of a planet before it has cooled
- The floor is lava, a children's game
- Hot Lava, a 2019 video game
