= Mark of the Ninja =

2012 video game

- Developer: Klei Entertainment
- Publishers: Microsoft Studios; Klei Entertainment (remaster)
- Director: Jeff Agala
- Producers: Alicia Savin; Jamie Cheng
- Designer: Nels Anderson
- Programmer: Chris Costa
- Artists: Aaron Bouthillier; Meghan Shaw
- Writer: Chris Dahlen
- Composers: Vince De Vera; Jason Garner
- Platforms: Xbox 360; Windows; Linux macOS; Nintendo Switch; Xbox One; PlayStation 4
- Release: September 7, 2012: Xbox 360; September 7, 2012; Windows; October 16, 2012; Linux, OS X; September 11, 2013; Switch, PS4, Xbox One; October 9, 2018
- Genres: Platform, stealth
- Mode: Single-player

Mark of the Ninja is a side-scrolling stealth platform game developed by Klei Entertainment and published by Microsoft Studios. It was announced on February 28, 2012, and later released for the Xbox 360 via Xbox Live Arcade on September 7, 2012. The game was released for Microsoft Windows on October 16, 2012, and for Linux and OS X on September 11, 2013. A remastered version was released on October 9, 2018, for Xbox One, PlayStation 4, Nintendo Switch, Microsoft Windows, macOS, and Linux by Klei Entertainment.

The game follows the story of a nameless ninja in the present day, and features a conflict between ancient ninja tradition and modern technology. Cutscenes for the game are rendered in a Saturday-morning cartoon animation style.

Mark of the Ninja received critical acclaim, with reviewers praising the game's visual and audio atmosphere, strong gameplay, and new take on the stealth genre, though some criticized its control scheme and difficult puzzles.

== Gameplay ==
Mark of the Ninja places a high emphasis on stealth. Here the player can see how much noise throwing an item will cause, as represented by the circle. Should an enemy be within range they may be alerted to the player character's presence.

Mark of the Ninja consists of stealth-oriented 2D platforming. The character is required to sneak through a series of environments while staying out of sight of guards and performing silent assassinations. Levels are divided into areas of light and darkness; the player character is visible to enemies in the former and invisible in the latter, though passing within a certain immediate distance of an enemy's face results in the player being spotted irrespective of lighting. Sounds such as running may also give away the player character's location and are represented visually by a rapidly expanding circle. Unusual for a platformer, Mark of the Ninja employs a line of sight mechanic, meaning that enemies which would be invisible to the character are also invisible to the player, though their sounds are represented on screen in the same manner as the player character's.

By approaching enemies undetected, the player character is able to execute a "one-hit" kill. To facilitate this, the player can extinguish light sources, hide behind objects and pass through narrow grates and shafts inaccessible to enemies. If detected, they must evade their enemies and remain out of sight for a set period of time, after which enemies will return to their original patrol routes and one-hit kills on them will once more be possible. Although fighting hand-to-hand with the goal of quickly disabling an enemy is possible, doing so risks being killed or disabled in turn, as well as alerting nearby enemies with a noisy scuffle. Enemies respond to their environment and one another; they will sound an alarm if they unambiguously spot the player character or find a body, which will alert all enemies in the area and prevent them from returning to their previous patrol routes. If they hear a sound or get a glimpse of the player character they become suspicious, displaying a question mark over their head and actively searching for the player character until they are convinced he is not actually present. They are also subject to terror tactics, and the player can learn to kill and display enemies in a terrifying manner, such as leaving a strangled enemy dangling from a perch or throwing a dead body at an unsuspecting live enemy, causing them to display an exclamation mark over their head, scream, stumble, and fire wildly at anything which scares or startles them.

The player receives points for executing a variety of tactics such as silent kills, passing by enemies without being detected, successfully preventing the discovery of bodies, terrorizing opponents to cause them to fall into disarray, and achieving optional goals such as recovering artifacts and a series of haiku which tell the history of the ninja clan. This score is reduced when an alert is sounded by enemy guards. Depending on the player's performance on the stages, they earn honor and complete seals that are used to buy or upgrade skills and weapons and also unlock alternate costumes. Players get honor by reaching a specific score on each stage, collecting the secret scrolls, and completing the special objectives present in each stage. Some of the scrolls are obtained through secret challenges, where the player is transported to a room to solve a puzzle.

Before each mission the player is taken to an upgrade screen, where they can spend their honor in three sections: Techniques (passive upgrades and skills such as new one-hit executions), Distraction Items (such as smoke bombs and firecrackers) and Attack Items (such as caltrops and poison-tipped darts). The next screen allows the player to select any unlocked costumes and equip items. Each costume (except the starting one) gives special bonuses, but also a side effect in order to balance its power, and must be unlocked by completing a number of seals in the form of optional goals related to the specialty of that costume (for instance, optionally terrorizing enemies in specific ways to unlock a costume which improves the ability to terrorize). Completing the game once unlocks a New Game Plus mode where the enemies behave more intelligently and can kill the player with only a single bullet or hand-to-hand strike, the player's line of sight is limited to a cone aimed in whatever direction the player is facing (preventing players from seeing what is behind, above, or below them unless they turn to look), the player is unable to see the enemy's line of sight and must intuit it from the direction an enemy's face is pointed, and the player can no longer detect the radius at which their actions will be heard by enemies.

== Plot ==
The game's story begins with an attack by a heavily armed force on the dojo of the Hisomu ninja clan. The unnamed ninja protagonist, resting after receiving an extensive irezumi tattoo, is awakened by a female ninja named Ora. Gathering his equipment, the protagonist is able to defeat the attackers and rescue his sensei, Azai, as well as several other members of the clan. Before being rescued by the protagonist, Azai was being blamed by the attackers, who said "you picked the wrong people to steal from". However, Azai simply claimed that the clan has been hidden from the modern world for centuries until now, when "their enemies finally found them". Azai tells him about the power of his tattoo and the legend surrounding it, explaining that the ink comes from a special desert flower and grants greatly sharpened senses and reflexes when absorbed slowly into the body, but will ultimately cause one so tattooed with it to descend into madness. In the distant past, the first Hisomu ninja to receive the Mark became incredibly dangerous, but increasingly deranged, leading to a lengthy reign of terror that only ended with his demise. Therefore, to receive the Mark, a ninja swears to commit seppuku once the madness begins to take hold.

After the protagonist receives his second tattoo, he and Ora are tasked to take revenge on the PMC responsible for the attack on the dojo: a corporation called Hessian, run by a ruthless Eastern European plutocrat named Count Karajan. Meanwhile, the horishi artist Dosan expresses concern over the tattoo ink's quality and promises to learn why Azai has not procured a fresh supply. The protagonist invades Hessian's East Asian regional headquarters and murders Corporal Kelly, the Hessian employee who led the attack on the dojo, and, using a stolen GPS tracking unit, stalks Karajan to his castle in Eastern Europe and slays him. Upon returning home, the protagonist and Ora see that their clan has stolen a great deal of high tech military equipment from Hessian, leaving them to realize that Azai's plan had been to rob Karajan and replace the old Hisomu Path with a modern, technological approach to espionage. Instead of committing seppuku, the protagonist flees with Ora to find Dosan, who had left a message indicating that he had personally gone in search of the mysterious desert flower.

Following his trail, the protagonist and Ora discover that Dosan has been captured by bandits, who are holding him hostage in a war-wracked Middle Eastern city and demanding that he Mark them with his remaining supply of the sumi ink. Upon being freed, Dosan explains that the flowers from whose leaves the sumi is produced have died out, and appear to have been dead at least since the last fresh supply of the ink was taken by the Hisomu clan. As revealed by hidden scrolls recounting the history of the clan, Azai himself had failed to defend the flowers when the devastated region to which they were endemic was taken over by vicious bandits. Thus dishonored, but for the sake of the clan's survival, Azai hid his failure and had planned the Hessian heist in order to supply the Hisomu with cutting-edge equipment now that the unique source of their strength had been extinguished. Finally, he ordered that the last of the sumi ink be used to Mark one final ninja, whose strength would enable the heist and save the clan itself from extinction at Hessian's hands. Dosan uses the remains of the sumi to give the protagonist his final tattoo, shortly before some of Azai's high tech ninja stalkers ambush them and shoot Dosan to death as he and the protagonist attempt to escape.

Having left his equipment behind during the hasty retreat, the protagonist, now obviously hallucinating, uses the almost superhuman reflexes afforded to him by the final Mark to evade death at the hands of both the bandits and the Hisomu stalkers, and travels back to Japan with Ora, who recommends he kill Azai for the dishonor of failing to maintain the traditional Hisomu way. The protagonist uses his almost preternatural abilities to infiltrate past Hisomu-jo's new sophisticated defenses, and confronts Azai in his garden. When Ora arrives and commands the protagonist to slay Azai, Azai claims to be unable to see Ora, and, suggesting that she is a symptom of the protagonist's creeping madness, insists that he satisfy his honor and kill himself before he slips too far beyond reason. Suddenly uncertain, the protagonist is reassured by Ora that Azai is lying to deceive him, and she urges him to murder Azai and purge the dishonorable Hisomu clan who followed him. Upon retrieving the ritual sword, the protagonist experiences a brief psychotic fugue state, in which he symbolically relives the events of his life subsequent to taking on the Mark. He finds himself in a courtyard opposite both Ora and Azai, who kneels and places his own sheathed sword on the ground, awaiting the protagonist's choice.

If the player chooses to kill Azai another psychotic episode follows, in which the protagonist murders his sensei and becomes the maniacal Hisomu tyrant of legend, melting silently into darkness with a swift strike of his sword. If the player chooses to kill Ora, the protagonist disembowels himself with the ritual sword and Ora dissolves into inky nothingness as the Marked ninja sputters his last breath and dies in the courtyard.

== Development ==
Lead designer Nels Anderson has stated that his principal inspiration in making Mark of the Ninja was the lack of stealthy ninjas in games like Ninja Gaiden, which he felt should be the norm, and Klei Entertainment founder Jamie Cheng said that it was important to the developers to make nonlethal tactics rewarding to the player "It took a lot of experimentation to allow players to feel like a badass ninja while at the same time feel the risk of being exposed." Whereas Klei had previously released Shank and Shank 2 on multiple platforms, the company unveiled Mark of the Ninja as an Xbox 360 exclusive with Microsoft Studios as its publisher after a pitch video was created. Following Klei's announcement on February 28, 2012, that it was developing Mark of the Ninja, the game featured at the Penny Arcade Expo East in Boston, Massachusetts in April 2012.

A downloadable content expansion called Special Edition was released on August 16, 2013. It adds a prequel level, two items, a costume and a commentary track.

=== Remastered edition ===
The 2018 high-definition remaster is named Mark of the Ninja: Remastered. It contains enhanced visuals, remastered cinematics and audio, and the Special Edition extra content.

== Reception ==
Reception

Aggregate score
Aggregator	Score
Metacritic	(X360) 90/100 (PC) 91/100

Review scores
Publication	Score
1Up.com	9/10
Edge	8/10
Electronic Gaming Monthly	9/10
Eurogamer	9/10
G4	5/5
Game Informer	9/10
GameRevolution	4.5/5
GameSpot	8.5/10
GamesRadar+	4.5/5
Giant Bomb	5/5
IGN	9/10
Official Xbox Magazine (UK)	9/10
Official Xbox Magazine (US)	9.5/10

Upon its release Mark of the Ninja received critical acclaim from both mainstream and video game journalists. On Metacritic, the game holds an aggregated review score of 90/100, based on 51 critic reviews, for Xbox 360, and one of 91/100, based on 14 critic reviews, for PC. The game received a perfect score from Brad Shoemaker of Giant Bomb, Destructoid's Holly Green, G4TV's Adam Rosenberg, and Dustin Chadwell of Gaming Age. The lowest score of 8 out of 10 came from Edge. IGN's Ryan McCaffrey felt that it was "easily a contender for Xbox Live Arcade Game of the Year". In The Penny Arcade Report's preview of the game, senior editor Ben Kuchera called it "a must-play game that should entrance even those skeptical of stealth games."

Kyle Orland of Ars Technica noted that the various ways of achieving a high score gave the game an aspect similar to puzzle games. Garrett Martin of the Boston Herald give high marks for the game's cutscenes and stated they were "good enough to warrant a Cartoon Network TV show." The reviewer from GameTrailers compared the game to a combination between the Nintendo game Ninja Gaiden and the modern open-world game Batman: Arkham City. He also lauded the controls and stated that the scheme "bends and yields to allow you to do exactly what you want precisely when you want to."

MTV.com's Charles Webb praised the game's ability to focus on stealth yet remain appealing to all players. "[Klei has] taken the key pillars of this type of game and made them transparent while keeping them challenging and fun" stated Webb. Matt Miller, Associate Editor at Game Informer, lauded the animations of the game. He further noted that the interplay of light and shadow further brought the visuals to life. The reviewer form Edge magazine agreed, and noted that the visuals were of "Saturday morning cartoon" quality. Official Xbox Magazine's Andrew Hayward also gave high marks for the visual atmosphere of the game, and further praised the "wealth of options" to complete missions.

Criticisms of the game included minor control issues and frustrating gameplay moments. Kotaku's Patricia Hernandez felt that the game had too many puzzles involving laser traps, and noticed that guards would on rare occasion "glitch out and not move and just look back and forth, making stealth impossible." Leif Johnson of GameSpot felt that the game's far sight mechanic could sometimes stunt the momentum and pacing during gameplay. The control scheme felt more suited for distanced stealth and less so for close quarters agility according to Eurogamer's Dan Whitehead. He cited an example where the player could press the B button to pick up and hide an enemy body. Doing so near a place where the player can hide caused frustration, as the contextual controls also use the B button to hide behind cover. Daniel Bischoff of Game Revolution praised the stealth kill mechanic, but was disappointed that the player character could not combat enemies face to face.

During the 16th Annual D.I.C.E. Awards, the Academy of Interactive Arts & Sciences nominated Mark of the Ninja for "Downloadable Game of the Year" and "Outstanding Achievement in Animation".

== See also ==
- List of ninja video games
