= Sugar Rush =

Sugar Rush may refer to:

== Film, television and literature ==
- Sugar Rush (2019 film), a Nigerian crime action comedy film
- Sugar Rush (novel), a 2004 novel by Julie Burchill
  - Sugar Rush (British TV series), a 2005–2006 British comedy drama series
- Sugar Rush (2005 TV series), an American cooking program
- Sugar Rush (2018 TV series), an American baking reality show
- "Sugar Rush" (The Apprentice), a 2007 television episode
- "Sugar Rush", a season 3 episode of Regular Show

== Music ==
- Sugar Rush (album), by The Humans, 2011
- Sugar Rush (Nic Cester album), 2017
- "Sugar Rush" (AKB48 song), 2012
- "Sugar Rush" (A-Teens song), 2001
  - also released by Dream Street from the 2001 album Dream Street
- "Sugar Rush", a 2013 EP by Virtual Riot
- "Sugar Rush", a song by Cash Cash from the 2008 album Take It to the Floor
- "Sugar Rush", a song by Joy Electric from the 1997 album Robot Rock

== Video games ==
- Sugar Rush (video game), a cancelled fighting game by Klei Entertainment
- Sugar Rush, a fictional kart-racing game in the Wreck-It Ralph franchise

== See also ==
- Sugar § Cognition
- Sugar High (disambiguation)
