= Early access =

Funding model in the video game industry

Early access, also known as alpha access, alpha founding, paid alpha, or game preview, is a funding model in the video game industry by which consumers can play a game in the various pre-release development cycles, such as pre-alpha, alpha, and/or beta, while the developer is able to use those funds to continue further development on the game. Those that pay to participate typically help to debug the game, provide feedback and suggestions, and may have access to special materials in the game. The early-access approach is a common way to obtain funding for indie games, and may also be used along with other funding mechanisms, including crowdfunding. Many crowdfunding projects promise to offer access to alpha and/or beta versions of the game as development progresses; however, unlike some of these projects which solicit funds but do not yet have a playable game, all early access games offer an immediately playable version of the unfinished game to players.

== History ==
Traditionally, game publishers do not release unfinished versions of their products to the public, instead relying on in-house testing non-disclosure agreements. This prevents such versions from becoming the target of software piracy, and limits what information can potentially be shared with competitors. As such, publishers will fund the full development of a game through its completion, but will be less willing to take risks on experimental titles. In some cases, publishers have found ways to allow players to win or buy into access into a game's beta state in a controlled environment. For example, an invitation to the beta version of the multiplayer portion of Halo 3 was bundled with the game Crackdown, contributing to the latter's strong sales.

For indie games, which are typically distributed without a publisher, the source of funding for development is not as readily available. Many smaller indie companies use personal funds, while larger ones may get investments from other sources, and more recently crowdfunding programs such as Kickstarter or Patreon have proven viable for both. Another difficulty for indie developers is the means of testing their games prior to release, lacking the resources of a publisher and not obtaining enough feedback prior to release.

The concept of early access helps to alleviate both problems. Early access to a game is typically offered when the game is in a playable state but may not be feature-complete, or may still have several software bugs to be found. Often these games are considered at alpha or beta releases, and may be months or years from anticipated completion. Interested players are able to buy into the development of the game, gaining access to the software in the working state, and are encouraged to play and stress-test the software. Their feedback can help the developer tune the game's direction, art, and software mechanics in anticipation of a final release. Once the game is released, the player either continues to have access to the software or is rewarded with a means to obtain the final release of the title and other extras, such as sounds, their name in the game's credits, or other rewards. These players help fund the game to completion, but take a risk that the game may never reach a final release. A further benefit can come from preliminary word-of-mouth of a game in an early access state. As players are typically not limited by confidentiality agreements to participate in early access, these players can provide reviews on social media, or play the game on streaming broadcasts, which subsequently can stimulate interest in the title.

One of the best-known early examples of this model is Minecraft. The game's development began in 2009 by Markus Persson initially for web browsers that he developed alongside his full-time job. The alpha-version game proved popular enough that within the month of release, Persson added a means by which players could pay €10 (approximately US$15) to access the game, allowing him to continue its development. As sales of the game increased, he was able to quit his job about eight months later to work on the game full-time, founding Mojang to bring on a larger development team. Minecraft continued to offer early access throughout its development period, assuring those that bought into it would receive the final version for free, which happened in November 2011. Prior to this, nearly two million players had purchased into the alpha- and beta-stage releases, with over $33 million raised from these early sales. Minecraft's success led to the early access approach becoming a popular way to publishing indie titles.

== Approach ==
To help early access, some digital distribution storefronts have provided the sales and distribution mechanisms for developers to use to offer their titles under early access. While these stores take a small fraction of the sales for the service, they also handle complex issues with payments through credit card and services like PayPal, bandwidth for delivering software, redemption of keys for other digital storefronts, and promotion within the storefront. The digital storefront Desura launched an alpha-funding initiative in 2011 to help indie developers promote upcoming titles. Valve added an early access to Steam in March 2013, allowing developers to take advantage of the Steam storefront and the Steamworks API. The storefront GOG.com began an early access program (EAP), "Games in Development" similar to Steam's in January 2016, but staying true to their storefront's philosophy, maintaining digital rights management-free titles and providing more curation to vet the titles using the service. GOG further implemented a 14-day, no-questions-asked refund policy for early access titles, which removes some of the risk for the potential buyer. itch.io introduced its Refinery early-access program in May 2016, which allowed developers to choose from other early-access models, including limited-user alphas and by-invite-only betas.

The Humble Bundle group has created a Humble Store that also provides storefront and distribution methods for indie gamers that wish to sell early access to games, and for developers looking to get on Steam, offers the ability to provide Steam redemption keys once these titles are listed at the storefront, while also incorporating a method to allow players to pay or tip the developer in addition to the base cost.

Video game console makers have also looked to the success of early access and have created their own similar programs for their consoles' users. Sony Computer Entertainment stated in July 2014 that they considering creating an early access program for independent PlayStation 4 developers following the Steam model, and launched this approach in September 2015 with the game Dungeon Defenders II. Microsoft similarly started the Xbox Game Preview program in June 2015 for those users involved with the dashboard preview of the Xbox One console with plans to expand it fully to all users on both Xbox One and Windows 10; the Xbox Game Preview program differs from other approaches as the early access titles include a free game demo at the current state of development to give players a chance to test the game before buying. This service was launched with the early access titles The Long Dark and Elite Dangerous. Google offers a similar Early Access program for the Google Play store for Android devices, starting in mid-2016.

Though most titles that use early access are from independent developers, some AAA developers have used an early access approach to augment their normal development cycles. Codemasters used Steam's Early Access to help develop Dirt Rally; at a point where they had to make a go or no-go decision on whether to proceed with full development of a niche racing title, the company opted to use early access to offer a polished version of the game still in development to meter interest and gain feedback from players, correcting issues that players had had with previous titles in their series. After about a year, Codemasters was confident to proceed to complete the game and producing console versions of it with their publisher alongside the personal computer version. Ubisoft used early access to help complete Tom Clancy's Ghost Recon Phantoms (previously named Ghost Recon Online) after the primary development work was complete, incorporating player response to fine-tune the final game.

Early access is often tied in with other means of funding. Games that have used Kickstarter or other crowdfunding mechanisms often include early access to backers, and later allow those that did not participate in the funding to buy into that early access, which helps to provide additional funds for further expansion. The term may also be used in a derogatory way to describe games released to the public at large under the presumption they were completed games, but still required a high degree of patching or updates to resolve large numbers of software bugs or to add features missing at launch, even if this was not the intent of the developer or publisher. Full release games such as No Man's Sky, Mass Effect: Andromeda, and Sea of Thieves have been negatively labeled by critics as "early access" in this manner.

For games that expect to be released as free-to-play with in-game monetization, developers and publishers frequently offer a paid-for "founders" package that gives players early access to the game, including in-game currency, special equipment or other items that mark them as founders they can use after the game's full release, and other benefits; further, any progress made during this period is retained when the game leaves early access, giving such players a head start over newer players. This approach has been used for games such as Paragon, Dauntless, and Fortnite: Save the World.

Around the late 2010s, major publishers began to use "early access" to describe pre-order or premium version incentives for their titles, though which the purchaser of these versions would get access to the step some days before the full release to regular purchasers. Games such as Mass Effect: Andromeda and Battlefield 2042 were some of the first games to offer these early access periods. In such cases, these early access periods are typically not used for player feedback but to identify last minute software bugs or test server performance before the full release. Similarly, the term "early access" has been used derogatorily to describe major game releases, typically from AAA studios, that are released with large number of bugs or unrefined gameplay with expectations that the game will have one or more updates shortly after release to fix. In such cases, the use of "early access" to describe these games is to reflect the seemingly incomplete game and that players that purchase the game at release are testers for the developer.

=== Steam Early Access ===
The "Steam Early Access" release service (run by Valve), makes use of proprietary Steam software for sales and distribution. The program launched on March 20, 2013, and initially made 12 games available. Before the games are released, the developers solicit feedback from Steam Early Access purchasers (who have contributed funds to the game's creation), to provide the needed input. After its release, Valve planned to have titles taken from their Steam Greenlight program added to Steam Early Access, as well as adding titles which have already been accepted through Steam Greenlight.

== Notable games using early access ==
In addition to Minecraft, the following is a partial list of games that have been considered successful uses of the early access approach:

=== In development ===
- Crab Champions, whose development began in 2019, was released on Steam's early access program in April 2023, exactly five years after Noisestorm's single "Crab Rave" was released.
- Grounded 2, a sequel to Grounded (also released in early access in 2020), was released in early access in July 2025 for Xbox Series X and PC and was nominated for the Best Early Access Game at the 2025 Golden Joystick Awards.
- Hytale began development in 2015 and was released in early access in January 2026, seven months after its initial cancellation.
- Into the Dead: Our Darkest Days, a spin‑off of the Into the Dead franchise, was released in early access on Steam in April 2025, shifting the series away from its traditional endless‑runner format into a survival simulator.
- inZOI was released in early access in March 2025 for Windows and sold over 1 million copies within its first week of release.
- Paralives began development in January 2019 and was released in early access in May 2026 after being delayed from its originally planned December 2025 release date, selling 250,000 copies within eight hours of its release.
- Path of Exile 2, a sequel to Path of Exile that began development in November 2019, was released in early access in December 2024 after being delayed from its originally planned late 2020 release date.
- Project Zomboid, which was leaked as a tech demo in June 2011, was released on Steam's early access program in November 2013. As of 2026, the game is still not released and remains under development.
- Star Citizen, whose development started in 2011 and which was announced in 2012 through a Kickstarter campaign. Official statements from the developer confirm the game was released in early access in 2017.
- Skate, a soft reboot of the Skate series, released in early access in September 2025.

=== Released ===
- Ark: Survival Evolved sold over a million copies within a month of its 2015 release in early access, and more than nine million by the time it fully released two years later.
- Baldur's Gate III, a role-playing game developed by Larian Studios using the 5th edition Dungeons and Dragons ruleset.
- Besiege was launched on early access without a strong campaign for gameplay, but had a great deal of visual polish that attracted users to the game. According to Steam Spy, more than a million copies of the game were sold within the first year of it being on early access. While it was one of the first games to use Steam's early access program in 2015, it spent five years before having its full release in February 2020.
- Conan Exiles sold 320,000 copies within one week of release on Steam's Early Access, fully covering Funcom's existing development costs and allowing them to further refine the game with community input. It left early access after about 15 months in May 2018, with more than one million sales prior to this point.
- Darkest Dungeon also used incremental updates during its early access, given the number of various gameplay mechanics systems it uses, and the developers, Red Hook Studios, had to handle a large volume of negative feedback upon the addition of one specific gameplay-changing mechanic they felt was critical to the game. The studio reported sales of over 650,000 across their early access period and a week after going live with their final version.
- DayZ, a multiplayer zombie-based survival game, gained more than 400,000 sales within one week of being on Early Access, and within a year, had over 3 million sales.
- Dead Cells, a roguelike-Metroidvania mashup game, spent about a year and four months in early access, using feedback from players to fine tune features. Prior to its full launch in August 2017, its developers Motion Twin announced the game had sold over 850,000 units.
- Don't Starve used both its own early access approach as well as Steam's version to incrementally add features and obtain feedback from its player base, treating each new release as a new expansion to the game to keep players engaged during this period. Klei Entertainment has used a similar early access development path for its subsequent titles Invisible, Inc., Oxygen Not Included and Griftlands.
- Fortnite by Epic Games used a paid early access period after both double closed beta period since around July 2017; that that purchased into this Founders' period would gain additional benefits once the game was released in full. Epic reported that more than 500,000 players purchased into this early access period within a week of its launch. The game's early access period was completed on June 30, 2020, spanning nearly three years, but Epic Games reneged on a prior promise to make its "Save the World" story mode free-to-play.
- Hades by Supergiant Games was released in early access alongside the launch of the Epic Games Store in December 2018. Supergiant provided regular updates and roadmaps to the game's development to players, as well as documented by NoClip, through its nearly two-year early access period. Nearly 700,000 copies were sold during the early access period, while another 300,000 were sold in three days after its official release to push total sales over one million units. Hades went on to win several game of the year awards for 2020.
- Kerbal Space Program followed a similar model to Minecraft and eventually moved onto Steam's early access program, where it sold millions of copies.
- Mount & Blade II: Bannerlord, released on March 30, 2020, quickly became the largest launch of the year on Steam, achieving more than 200,000 concurrent players.
- PlayerUnknown's Battlegrounds released on Steam's early access program in late March 2017 with a focused plan to complete early access within six months through frequent updates. Within six months, Battlegrounds had sold more than ten million copies and grossed over $100 million in revenue. By the time the game was fully released in December 2017, PUBG reported over 30 million total players, a number buoyed by the popularity of the game in China.
- Prison Architect was able to raise around eight million in revenue from more than 250,000 sales of the game while still in early access.
- Scum, a survival game developed by Gamepires, sold 250,000 units on its first day of sale within early access in August 2018, and reached over one million sales three weeks later. It spent seven years in early access before having its full release in June 2025.
- Slay the Spire was first released into early access in November 2017 by MegaCrit. The studio announced the deck-building game had reached over 1 million units sold by June 2018.
- Subnautica launched to lukewarm reception on early access in December 2014, but its developer continued to push forward on a very open development process, allowing users to directly see some of their project planning documentation and providing the means to provide feedback directly from the game. This enabled the game to get refined through the early access process and gain favorable reviews, leading towards further release on console systems.
- The Long Dark, a wilderness survival game, has had its early access users sharing their own adventures in the game's current sandbox mode on the games' forums, from which its developer, Hinterland, has been quietly using to improve the game and crafting the game's planned story mode around some of this indirect feedback.
- Unturned, a zombie survival game, allows players to create content for the game in early access, which can be downloaded by players from the steam community workshop, and is sometimes added directly into the game by its developer.

=== Unfinished games ===
There have been some notable examples of unfinished games of the early access approach. The game Earth: Year 2066 was placed on Steam's early access with numerous promised features, but found by those that purchased the title that the game has numerous programming bugs making it unplayable, that it failed to approach its promises on the product page and used a number of assets from the commercial game engine. Many users, including James Stephanie Sterling of The Escapist, called out on both its developer Killing Day Studios for abusing the early access program and for Valve to remove the title for fraudulently representing gameplay. Valve subsequently removed the title and refunded money, noting that while developers using early access have the right to promote and set the pricing for their games, "Steam does require honesty from developers in the marketing of their games".

Another example is the Spacebase DF-9; while the development team from Double Fine had laid out plans for several features and gameplay improvements over time, Double Fine opted to end its full-time development, completing its early access and releasing a final product that while fully playable lacked many of the planned features; the company will continue to fix critical bugs with the game and will include support for user modifications via Steam's Workshop channel but will not create any new content for the game itself, disappointing many players of the game that were looking forwards to these planned features. Shortly after the release of 1.0, twelve employees were laid off including the programmer and project lead JP LeBreton. Later on the Double Fine forums it was announced that there were no further plans for patches and there was no team assigned to the project, leaving Steam Workshop integration in limbo. Double Fine's Tim Schafer stated that they opted for this solution as while DF-9 represented their first experiment with the early access approach, they had reached a point where the amount of money earned from sales of the game in early access were not covering the production costs, and the timeline to reach the planned goals would have been several years down the road.

Second Extinction, a first-person shooter that was under development by Systemic Reaction, was released in early access in October 2020. The game was planned to remain in early access until October 2022, when the game was scheduled to be commercially released. After numerous delays, Systemic Reaction cancelled the game's commercial release in October 2023 and subsequently announced that the game's early access servers would shut down in 2024, which would result in the game becoming unplayable.

The sandbox game Ashes of Creation began development at Intrepid Studios in 2016 and was the target of a Kickstarter campaign in June 2017 that raised over $3.25 million in funding from 19,000 backers, making it one of the most successful campaigns in the platform's history. On January 22, 2026, one month after the game was released to Steam's early access program, lead developer Steven Sharif addressed rumors of layoffs, stating that nine out of 250 employees had been impacted by "targeted team adjustments" and assuring that the layoffs would not reflect the fate of the game. Sharif would announce his resignation from Intrepid on January 31, citing an internal feud between creative leaders and the studio's board of directors. After layoff notices were sent to all employees of Intrepid Studios in the wake of Sherif's resignation, Ashes of Creation was cancelled and removed from sale on Steam. In the days following the cancellation of the game, an investor claimed that Intrepid had accrued $140 million in debt. Several employees also filed lawsuits against Intrepid over alleged violations of the WARN Act; they sought to recover the compensation that they were owed after the studio's employees were notified that they would not receive their final paychecks.

== Reception ==
Video game critics have generally developed policies to avoid doing final, scored reviews for games in early access, instead offering interim commentary on the game. Polygon states they feel that they should provide consumer commentary on any product that is being sold to consumers, but recognize that early access titles are still in-progress works and thus will handle these in a different manner than their normal product reviews. Eurogamer, as part of an updated review policy, will only formally review retail versions of games after their release, though may give initial impressions of games still in early access development.

Games still in early access have generally not been considered for the industry's top awards, since they have technically not yet been published yet and received in-depth critical reviews. However, the question of whether early access games can qualify for these awards was raised in 2017 when PlayerUnknown's Battlegrounds was nominated for several awards including Game of the Year for The Game Awards; at the time, Battlegrounds was nearing its first non-early access release, but had yet to officially publish outside it. Gamasutra considered the concept of early access, particularly Steam's approach, as one of the five trends in 2013 that defined the direction that the video game industry was headed.

The early access approach has been criticized by some; as noted by Ben Kurchera of Polygon stated that the early access model validates the use of unfinished games as a "valid business strategy". While those that buy into the early access do get an incomplete game to play, test out, and provide input to the developers, these people also run the risk that the game will never be completed or may be a sub-par product. A study using Steam's Early Access as of November 2014 found that only 25% of the titles submitted as early access had made it to a final release form. Sergey Galyonkin, the creator of the Steam Spy tool to estimate sales of games through Steam profiles, identified that contrary to popular belief, early access titles only gain one major sales boost - when the game is first released in early access on Steam - as opposed to having a second sales boost once the game leaves early access.

Another concern related to early access is how long the title spends in that state. Most successful titles that have used early access typical remained in early access for about one year before a full release. Some have stayed in an early access state for multiple years, such as Kerbal Space Program and DayZ, and others have remained in a perpetual early access state, like Star Citizen. Consumers do not necessarily have assurance of when the early access period will be done, or if it will ever be considered complete.

Due to some early access failures, such as Spacebase DF-9, by 2014 early access has gained a negative connotation, as games do not have the quality assurances of complete titles, and in the case of Steam's Early Access, the lack of curating and testing by Steam to make sure the games are representative of the storefront's description. Some players also worry about the "double dip" effect, in which a game may be promoted twice, first through its introduction on early access, and then on its subsequent full release. In November 2014, Valve updated its early access rules for developers to address concerns that had been raised. Among these include the statement that games on early access should be in a playable alpha or beta state, there are clear expectations of what the final product of the game will be like, and that the developer intends to continue work on the game, and can be financially stable enough to ultimately release a finished product. Since 2014, early access has regained more acceptance as developers better tailor projects for release in this manner, typically by creating sufficient foundation for game to have its planned an entertainment factor and technical stability, and using early access to gradually release additional content and observe and adjust to emergent ideas that come from the early access player base.

Other games have been considered by commentators to have used the early access approach well in light of the above concerns, typically bringing near-finished products with frequent and continual content updates and direct interaction between developer and players to improve the product before its final release. Games with roguelike features appear well suited to take advantage of early access, allowing the developers to tweak the procedural generation systems with player feedback. Several titles that have used Steam's Early Access in such a manner include Invisible, Inc., Nuclear Throne, Armello, Broforce, Prison Architect, Darkest Dungeon, Besiege, Infinifactory, Subnautica, and Ark: Survival Evolved. This also helps in combination with early access games that gain popularity through streaming channels, as the developers not only get increased awareness of the game but can gain direct feedback from the streamer and their audience on game balance and improvement, such as reported by the developers for Hades, Slay the Spire, and Risk of Rain 2.

== See also ==
- Crowdfunding in video games
- List of video game crowdfunding projects
