= Don't Starve Elsewhere =

Upcoming video game by Klei Entertainment

- Developer: Klei Entertainment
- Publisher: Klei Entertainment
- Platform: Windows
- Genres: Survival, action-adventure
- Modes: Single-player, multiplayer

Don't Starve Elsewhere is an upcoming survival video game adventure developed and published by Klei Entertainment. It is a spinoff or sequel to Don't Starve, which introduces new features, absent in the original game, such as vertical environments, different art style and new interaction types. The game was announced on April 9, 2026, with the date of release to be announced later.

== Gameplay ==
Don't Starve Elsewhere, similar to Don't Starve Together, is planned to be a co-op survival game, featuring the same characters, but set in a different world with different items, NPCs, biomes and story. Environmental features include mountains, rivers and elevation changes, with each biome having its own independent climate. The game introduces both vertical environments, swimming, jumping and falling to the series. One of the major mechanics introduced in the game is "The Fog" - thick clouds that spread across the landscape, cursing all they touch, that offer the player to explore their secrets or run away.

== Reception ==
Reviewers received the announcement with an interest to a new game of Klei Entertainment, saying that the new game is a "serious upgrade". Some expressed their fascination by jumping mechanic, shown in the trailer, also noting that the game shows more fantasy and magical elements. The graphic aesthetic of the world of Elsewhere was also described as "unsettling" and containing less "paper cutout" feeling than Don't Starve.
