= Griftlands =

2021 video game

- Promotional image
- Developer: Klei Entertainment
- Publisher: Klei Entertainment
- Platforms: Microsoft Windows; Linux; macOS; Nintendo Switch; PlayStation 4; Xbox One
- Release: Windows, macOS, Linux; June 1, 2021; Switch, PS4, Xbox One; June 4, 2021
- Genre: Roguelike deck-building
- Mode: Single-player

Griftlands is a 2021 roguelike deck-building video game developed and published by Klei Entertainment. It was initially released in early access for Microsoft Windows in June 2019; the full version of the game was released for Windows, Linux, macOS, Nintendo Switch, PlayStation 4 and Xbox One in June 2021.

== Gameplay ==
Griftlands is a roguelike deck-building game with elements of role-playing and digital card games. The player starts a game by selecting one of the predefined characters, each a mercenary seeking fame and fortune in on a planetary world that is home to an antagonistic peacekeeper body, pirates, and dangerous creatures. While the layout of the world is the same each game, the events, missions, and other elements within it are procedurally generated on starting a new game.

The game is broken up between moving about on an overworld map and engaging in conversation trees to gain quests or shop, and card-based encounters. At the start of the game, the player's character is given two pre-defined decks of cards, one representing those to be used in combat encounters, and another to be used in negotiations. As the player progresses in the game, they can gain new cards for either deck from quest rewards or through shops, upgrade existing cards to more potent versions, or have cards removed from either deck. Additionally, players can earn special implants called grafts for their character that have persistent effects throughout the rest of the game. The player can also purchase limited use item cards for either deck from vendors, as well as enlist computer-controlled allies to assist in negotiation and battle.

Rook, an unlockable character, engages in conversation with Fssh, a non-player character.

If an encounter results in combat, then the player takes turn with the computer opponent. Each turn, the player is drawn a hand from their combat deck, and has a number of action points available to use to play cards, which have different action point costs. Combat cards represent a mix of offensive skills to attack the opponent, and defensive skills as to block attacks. The player is informed through the game's interface of what attacks their opponents will do, so they may prepare appropriately. Once the player has used their action points, they discard all remaining cards in their hand, and the opponent's turn is resolved. If the player's character health drops to zero, the game is over. Alternatively, the player can attack to kill their opponents in the same way, but may also try to simply overpower them, allowing the opponent to flee if they take enough damage. This choice may have future impacts on mission availability and rewards.

Negotiations play out similarly to combat, though these are between the player character and a single foe. The goal in negotiations is to wear the opponent's resolve to zero before the player character's. Here, cards represent friendly negotiations which generally do not have ill effects, hostile commentary which may trigger certain actions, and defensive composure cards to prevent losing resolve. Like combat, the player is given information as to what moves the opponent will make. Additionally, special arguments may become active as a result of cards or other abilities. These arguments can damage the opponent's resolve or provide other boosts, among other effects, while they remain active. The player, instead of testing the resolve of the opponent, can try to take out the argument by attacking it directly. If the player's resolve drops to zero, this does not end the game, but changes what may follow: the attempt to swap an opponent may simply fail, or it may cause the player to engage in combat with the character.

Should the player character die in combat, the game will end, but on easier difficulties the player can choose to restart the day. Once the game ends, a score for the current run is calculated and used to unlock packs of new cards that will become available for both battle and negotiations. Victory also ends the run, as well as unlocking a new difficulty. There are seven difficulties available in addition to Story Mode, from Prestige 1 to Prestige 7. In addition, success in confrontations awards the player a bonus resource named mettle on all but the highest difficulty, which may be used at a special vendor to purchase permanent upgrades for each player character that carry over between runs.

== Synopsis ==
=== Setting and characters ===
Griftlands takes place in a futuristic science-fiction fantasy setting, where humans populate the game world in addition to anthropomorphic humanoid races such as the crustacean-like Kra'deshi. Advanced space-faring technology and energy-based weapons are available, fueled by fictional power sources Lumin and Spark. The setting is in contest between governing bodies such as the Admiralty, religious orders such as the Cult of Hesh, industrial factions such as the Spark Barons guild, and criminal organizations like the bandit guild Spree. There is a finite number of defined NPCs that populate all three campaigns with a fixed appearance, faction allegiance, and social bonuses, but the actual in-game role played by each NPC is randomly determined - some NPCs however always play the same role in each campaign as either allies or boss combat encounters. The names and purposes of locations on the overworld map are also fixed, but their availability and physical location may vary between runs.

=== Plot ===
There are three playable campaigns available in the game, each following the multi-day journey of a specific protagonist: the formerly indentured servant Sal Ik-Derrick who now seeks revenge on the criminal that sold her into slavery as a child, the secretive and experienced spy Rook on a dangerous mission, and the alcoholic vagrant Kra'deshi Smith Banquod who returns home seeking his inheritance after the death of his wealthy parents.

In Sal's campaign, she travels to the cosmopolitan coast-side city of Murder Bay to seek revenge on the notorious criminal Kashio. With the help of childhood friend Fssh, Sal negotiates the aid of either rising Admiralty officer Oolo or dangerous Spree overboss Nadan, each seeking to capture or kill the other, to sneak into a high-stakes auction. There, she confronts Kashio and either kills her or spares her after emerging victorious from a fight. Now wealthy from the spoils of battle, Sal sets out to enjoy her freedom.

In Rook's campaign, he arrives at the remote and desolate Grout Bog on a mission. The area is being contested between the industrious Spark Barons that oversee operations to mine the area for Spark, and the labor union known as the Rise that seek to commit a worker's uprising. To make matters more complicated, the regional operation is being led by Baron Fellemo, a comrade of Rook's from his prior days serving in a paramilitary organization, and there is a reclusive third faction of pagans known as Boggers that worship the Bog itself. Rook infiltrates both the Spark Barons and the Rise, each believing him to be a double agent loyal to them, but his mission's true goal is to secure a mysterious device located deep within the Bog under the control of the Boggers. With the help of either Fellemo or the Rise leader Kalandra, Rook negotiates passage deep into the Bog. He then fights either Fellemo or Kalandra or leaves them to battle amongst each other, faces the Boggers and a monstrous creature, and finally retrieves the device and leaves the Bog.

In Smith's campaign, he returns to his ancestral home after the untimely death of his parents from an event known as the Great Beaching, where a colossal and mysterious beast washes ashore, crushing many to death. This is seen as a religious omen by the Cult of Hesh, though its true purpose is unknown. The black sheep of his family, Smith is tossed out from the estate and disowned by his siblings: younger brother and merchant prince Theroux, twin sister and rising Admiralty officer Mullifee, and older brother and Cult of Hesh cardinal Vixmalli. Smith is then contacted by a high-ranking official of the Cult of Hesh, Tei Utaro, who recruits him in a clandestine operation to purge the order of corrupt individuals. First Smith confronts Theroux by engaging him to be wed to a con artist, then Smith is met by Mullifee who enlists his aid in dealing with either a corrupt Admiralty officer or a dangerous Rise leader. Finally Smith is contacted by a Bogger operative who informs him that Vixmalli has been infested by an ancient parasite that has unique mutative properties, transmitted from the dead behemoth that washed ashore in the Great Beaching. Utaro speculates that the creature seeks to transform the world as part of a millennia-old cycle, starting with the infection of a group of politicians and foreign dignitaries at an imminent meeting being held by the Cult of Hesh to address the Great Beaching. Smith infiltrates the event with the help of his allies and confronts Vixmalli, who is brought into the belly of the beast and transformed into a monstrous creature. Smith has the option of either killing or reconciling with each of his siblings, but nevertheless defeats the transformed Vixmalli, leaving the behemoth to be returned to the ocean by an unseen tentacled force. While the Cult seeks to make sense of these events, Smith emerges triumphant as a Banquod and becomes head of the family.

== Development ==
Griftlands was developed by Klei Entertainment. The game was announced at E3 2017, at that time being an open-world RPG with encounters being played out in turn-based combat similar to most Japanese RPGs. In the interim years, Klei mentioned little of Griftlands while producing Oxygen Not Included. In October 2018, Klei had posted to the game's product page that "we jumped the gun on announcing it because we thought we were further along than we were." The game was re-shown at E3 2019, and while it retained the same setting and art style, the game had transitioned to card-based system, dropping the open world and more traditional role-playing games combat.

Griftlands was released as an early access title in July 2019 for Epic Games Store for a year. The early access version was released on Steam on 15 June 2020 alongside a free demo, and the full version of the game is expected in 6–12 months from the early access release date. The full version of the game was released for Microsoft Windows and Linux on June 1, 2021, and for Nintendo Switch, PlayStation 4 and Xbox One on June 4, 2021.

== Reception ==
Reception

Aggregate score
Aggregator	Score
Metacritic	PC: 84/100

Review scores
Publication	Score
Game Informer	8.75/10
IGN	9/10
PC Gamer (US)	80/100

Griftlands received "generally favorable" reviews for Microsoft Windows, according to review aggregator Metacritic.

During the 25th Annual D.I.C.E. Awards, the Academy of Interactive Arts & Sciences nominated Griftlands for "Strategy/Simulation Game of the Year".
