= Hot Lava =

2019 action-adventure video game

- Developer: Klei Entertainment
- Publisher: Klei Entertainment
- Designer: Mark Laprairie
- Engine: Unity
- Platforms: iOS; macOS; tvOS; Windows
- Release: September 19, 2019
- Genre: platform
- Modes: Single-player, multiplayer

Hot Lava is a 2019 platform video game developed and published by Klei Entertainment. Announced in 2016, it was developed by Mark Laprairie before he was hired by Klei who turned it into a full game. It is based primarily on the children's game with the same name. It was released on September 19, 2019, for Microsoft Windows through Steam and for iOS, macOS, and tvOS through Apple Arcade.

== Gameplay ==
Hot Lava is a parkour platformer video game, played from a first-person perspective. In the game, the player controls the character as they jump, leap, wall run, and swing from object to object. Some of the objects include tables, couches, and chairs. Over time, the player unlocks various new athletic abilities, including double jumps.

== Plot ==
The plot is non-linear and vague, but revolves around the player character 'Squirt' and their older sister (represented by life-sized action figures) as they play tag, chase and, most notably, the floor is lava, set in fantasized versions of childhood environments - mainly Gym-Class, Playground, School, Wholesale, Master-Class, and Basement. These environments each have a 'main level', consisting of the real-world version, with various portals to fantasized version designed after a child's imagination, each a course to be completed.

Each course has multiple challenges, including completing the course within a certain amount of time or finding hidden collectibles.

== Development and release ==
Hot Lava is the first 3D game by Klei Entertainment, the developers behind Don't Starve and Invisible, Inc., and is based on the children's game with the same name. The game started as a "passion project" by Mark Laprairie, influenced by the climbing mod ("kz climb") in Counter-Strike: Global Offensive, before he was hired by Klei Entertainment. Laprairie previously worked on Dead Rising 2 and Dead Rising 3, along with Klei's Don't Starve. Hot Lava was submitted to Steam's Greenlight system, whereby the community votes on whether they like the game. The game passed in under forty hours.

The official gameplay trailer of Hot Lava was released on August 29, 2016. Pre-release beta testing was temporarily made available.

Klei added Steam Workshop compatibility, allowing players to design and publish their own parkour maps for others to play ingame. Some are featured heavily in the official game's level select.

== Reception ==
Reception

Aggregate score
Aggregator	Score
Metacritic	iOS: 64/100

Review score
Publication	Score
TouchArcade	4/5

=== Pre-release ===
Many video game journalists compared Hot Lava to Mirror's Edge, another parkour-based video game.

=== Accolades ===
The game was nominated for "Adventure" and "Multiplayer/Competitive Game" at the 2020 Webby Awards.
