= Sugar High =

Sugar High may refer to:

- Sugar high, a misconception that sugar can cause hyperactivity
- Sugar High (album), a 2002 album by Chihiro Onitsuka
- "Sugar High", a 2001 song by Jade Anderson
- "Sugar High", a 2017 song by Chappell Roan
- Sugar High, a 2011 TV series on the Food Network hosted by Duff Goldman
- Sugar High (film), a 2020 baking competition special

== See also ==
- Sugar Rush (disambiguation)
