= Crab Champions =

Upcoming video game

- Developer: Noisestorm
- Designer: Eoin O'Broin
- Engine: Unreal Engine 4
- Platform: Windows
- Release: 1 April 2023 (early access)
- Genres: Roguelike, third-person shooter
- Modes: Single-player, multiplayer

Crab Champions is an upcoming looter shooter video game developed and published by Noisestorm for Windows. The game is based on Noisestorm's hit song titled "Crab Rave", which featured a 3D animated music video of dancing crabs. The song quickly grew viral upon its release, garnering millions of views on YouTube, and millions more plays across all music streaming platforms. The game was first announced on 1 April 2019, one year after the song was released, and became available on Steam as Early Access on 1 April 2023, five years after the song made its debut.

== Gameplay ==
In Crab Champions, players take control of a crab and use firearms to destroy other crabs, critters, and boss creatures. The game features both single-player and multiplayer modes, allowing players to play with up to 3 other friends. The player can choose to begin each playthrough with weapons such as miniguns, rocket launchers, pistols and more. At the end of each level or in a shop level, the player can choose from a selection of stacking upgrades to their weapon, health, armor, grenades or melee attacks. Every 8 levels, the player must face a boss and, if victorious, are rewarded with keys that can be used to unlock new content such as new weapons.

Players can customize their crabs with a range of skins, all available for free, after completing in-game achievements. As the game is still in early-access, new content is constantly being added to the game.

== Development ==
After seeing the success of "Crab Rave", O'Broin saw an opportunity for a video game. This was facilitated by the fact that O'Broin was experienced in video game engine Unreal Engine 4, as his previous two music releases, "Crab Rave" and "Breakout" both included a 3D animated music video which he produced. As a result, O'Broin started development on Crab Champions at the end of 2018 using Unreal Engine 4, being inspired by other roguelike games such as Spelunky and The Binding of Isaac. He wanted to create a game that was both challenging and fun, and he felt that the combination of third-person shooter and roguelike elements would be a perfect fit.

O'Broin began working on Crab Champions full-time after putting a pause on his music career in 2018, following his release of "Breakout". He released a trailer of the game in 2019. Development did not go as he had hoped, because with a planned release date of 20 August 2020, O'Broin decided that the game was not quite polished enough, and wanted it to be a genuinely fun and replayable game, as opposed to a meme, or joke of a game, so he cancelled the release indefinitely.

Moving forward, O'Broin listed the game on Steam as unreleased/coming soon, and would post near-monthly updates to the game's Steam news hub, and share what he had been working on. On 9 January 2023, O'Broin announced that the game would release in early access on April Fool's Day, 1 April, on the 5 year anniversary of "Crab Rave"'s release.

== Reception ==
Crab Champions was met with positive reviews when it entered Early Access. Critics praised the game's fast-paced gameplay, its variety of weapons and abilities, and its art style. The game has been a commercial success.
