= Don't Starve =

2013 video game developed by Klei Entertainment

- Cover art, depicting Wilson, one of the playable characters
- Developer: Klei Entertainment
- Publisher: Klei Entertainment
- Composers: Vince de Vera; Jason Garner; Emmett Hall
- Platforms: Android; iOS; Linux; Microsoft Windows; OS X; PlayStation 3; PlayStation 4; PlayStation Vita; Wii U; Xbox One; Nintendo Switch
- Release: April 23, 2013: Linux, Microsoft Windows, OS X; WW: April 23, 2013; PlayStation 4; NA: January 7, 2014; EU: January 8, 2014; PlayStation Vita; NA: September 2, 2014; EU: September 3, 2014; Wii U; NA: May 28, 2015; EU: June 4, 2015; PlayStation 3; NA: June 23, 2015; EU: June 24, 2015; iOS; WW: July 9, 2015; Xbox One; WW: August 26, 2015; Android; WW: October 20, 2016; Nintendo Switch; WW: April 12, 2018
- Genre: Survival
- Modes: Single-player, multiplayer

Don't Starve is a survival game developed and published by Klei Entertainment. The game was initially released for Microsoft Windows, OS X, and Linux on April 23, 2013. A PlayStation 4 port, renamed Don't Starve: Giant Edition, became available the following year (with PlayStation Vita and PlayStation 3 versions released in September 2014 and June 2015 respectively, and an Xbox One version released in August 2015). Don't Starve for iOS, renamed Don't Starve: Pocket Edition was released on July 9, 2015. An Android version was released on October 20, 2016. Downloadable content titled Reign of Giants was released on April 30, 2014, and a multiplayer standalone expansion called Don't Starve Together became free for existing users on June 3, 2015. On Steam, this game can be purchased with a free copy for a friend. A Nintendo Switch port came out on April 12, 2018.

The game follows a scientist named Wilson who finds himself in a dark, dreary parallel world known as the Constant and must survive as long as possible. To this end, the player must keep Wilson alive, fed, and mentally stable as he avoids a variety of surreal and supernatural enemies that will try to kill and devour him. The game's Adventure mode adds depth to the sparse plot and pits Wilson against the game's supposed antagonist, Maxwell.

Don't Starve was Klei's first foray into the survival genre. Conceived during the height of a game industry trend of dropping players into a world with few instructions and a goal of survival, the game was influenced by Minecraft which spearheaded this trend as well as by filmmaker Tim Burton. The game received positive reviews from critics, commended for its original art style, music, and variety of ways for the player to die, although its high level of difficulty and implementation of permanent death were less warmly received.

== Gameplay ==
Don't Starve is a survival game with a randomly generated open world and elements of action-adventure and roguelike gameplay. Combat is handled by pointing and clicking with the mouse, or by using "force attack" (ctrl+f), while other activities are controlled by the keyboard, or using the inbuilt gamepad support to play using a controller, giving it a console-like gameplay feel. The goal is to survive as long as possible, and a count of the number of days the player has survived is shown onscreen. The game keeps few records of player progress besides the total number of experience points and the playable characters unlocked. Wilson is the default playable character, unlocked upon purchase of the game, but the next character, Willow, can be unlocked with 160 experience points. Woodie, the last character unlockable with experience, requires the game's limit of 1,600. Each character has a perk that is specific to them, as well as a disadvantage. The player earns 20 experience points each in-game day and receives them after dying. Death is permanent, barring the use of several rare or expensive items like the Meat Effigy, Touch-Stone, and Life-Giving Amulet.

The game relies on a day/night cycle that causes meaningful fluctuations in gameplay style. During the day, the player spends most of their time exploring the world: gathering food, firewood, and other resources, discovering crafting recipes to combine available items, and avoiding enemies. With nightfall comes dangerous monsters and an invisible menace, Charlie, who attacks the player when the screen is dark. A player must have a light source or night vision to prevent Charlie from attacking. Crafting from recipes allows the player to build shelter, weapons, and tools like axes. Almost all tools will break after running out of durability, by using them, with exceptions such as Woodie's Axe. Players can forage and farm plants as well as hunt animals for sustenance, with several characters having dietary perks or restrictions. Food can spoil, however, so the player cannot keep it for too long. Eating spoiled food results in a loss of health, sanity, and a reduced increase in hunger restoration relative to that provided by fresh food. Each in-game day takes 8 minutes of real time. The length of day and night varies across the seasons, with day being shorter and night longer in winter.

Wolfgang, an unlockable character, runs from a cadre of spider queens and their young at dusk, next to spider-dens.

Death can occur in a variety of ways. The player has three gauges displayed on the game's head-up display, which respectively track hunger, health, and sanity. Hunger diminishes by default, being replenished with food. Sanity decreases during the dusk and night or as a result of specific unpleasant actions, such as robbing graves or being near monsters; it can be replenished through mentally stimulating activities, such as sleeping, picking flowers, and wearing fashionable clothing. When the hunger meter reaches zero, it begins to chip away at health, which will eventually result in the player's death. A large variety of creatures can attack the player, including giant one-eyed birds, tree monsters, tentacles whose owners are not shown, and even small, weak frogs that will nonetheless try to accost the player. When attacked by a frog, the player will drop a random item in their inventory. Additionally, when a character's sanity is below 15% of their sanity limit, figments of the character's imagination become corporeal and able to attack the player. Some creatures, such as pig-like creatures often found in tribes, begin as neutral to the player (excluding the Reign of Giants character Webber), but the player's actions may lead them to be allies or hostile foes, such as attacking one.

The bulk of the game is played in Sandbox Mode, but there is a second mode, Adventure, which the player can access by finding a landmark called Maxwell's Door. Adventure serves as the game's campaign, consisting of five levels that pit the player against Maxwell, the antagonist of Don't Starve. The player loses all items and recipes upon entering and can only pick four items to keep upon completion of each chapter. Death or the end of the five sections returns the player intact to Sandbox Mode.

== Plot ==
=== Characters ===
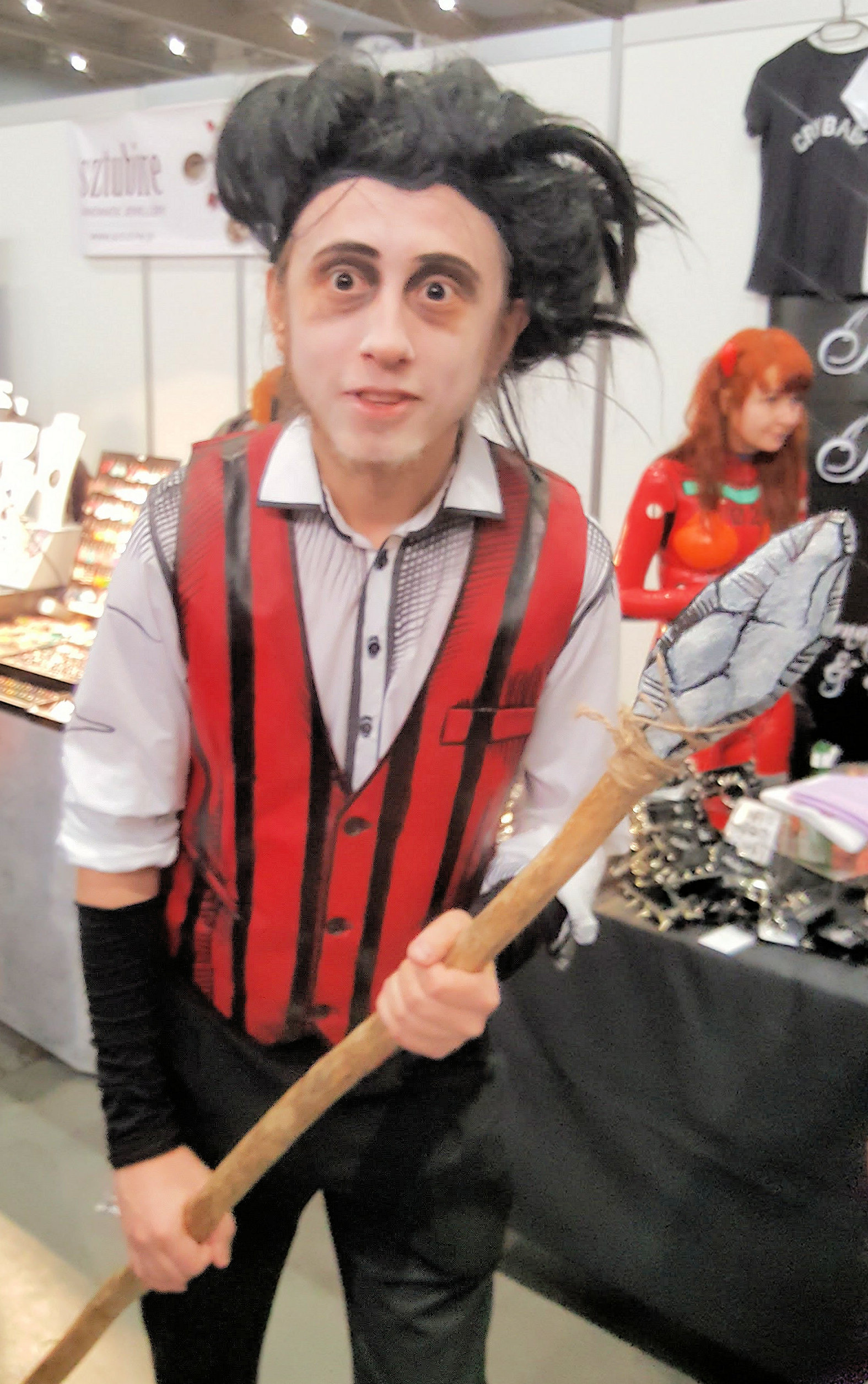
Cosplay of Wilson at Pyrkon 2017

Wilson, a gentleman scientist, is the everyman protagonist of Don't Starve. While Wilson has no special abilities beyond growth of "a magnificent beard", which slows the speed of freezing in winter and accelerates overheating in summer, other playable characters do: Willow, a firestarter, spawns into the world with a unique lighter which acts as a better initial light source and is immune to fire damage, but will start spreadable fires on the ground when she has low sanity. A girl named Wendy receives visits from her deceased twin sister Abigail when summoned, who can help her attack monsters. The strongman, Wolfgang, has high health and significant offensive capabilities that grow better the more his hunger meter is full, but he starves faster and loses more sanity when near danger. WX-78 is an automaton who nonetheless needs to eat, sleep, and stay mentally stimulated, but does not become ill from spoiled food, can increase their maximum health, hunger, and sanity with gears (reset to the original maximum after dying and respawning; the corpse leaves behind a portion of the used ones), and takes damage from rain (which causes sparks bright enough to ward off Charlie). Being made of conductible material, WX-78 also attracts lightning that surrounds them by a glow that gradually dies down as time passes and refills their health, but also lowers their sanity. Wes is a mime with fast depleting hunger and low damage. His maximum health and hunger are lower than most characters and he cannot talk, making him unable to warn the player of status ailments or incoming enemy waves. His sole merit is the unique ability to make balloons (which can act as diversions). Other characters include Wickerbottom, an insomniac witch writer and librarian who doesn't require a science machine to craft many items because of her advanced intellect and who takes greater penalties from spoiled food; and Woodie, a Canadian lumberjack accompanied by a talking axe named Lucy and who has the dark secret that he turns into a werebeaver under the full moon.

The game's supposed antagonist is Maxwell. Maxwell is described as a puppet master who is dapper and frail in stature. He is the final unlockable character, obtained after completion of the story rather than with experience points. The character version of Maxwell starts with more powerful items than the others and has a book that when activated, spawns a shadow clone of himself that aids him in battle, mining, and wood chopping. A maximum of 3 puppets can be spawned at once, and each will disappear 2.5 days after it is spawned if it doesn't die earlier. The secondary antagonist in all games, and the primary antagonist of the multiplayer sequel § Don't Starve Together (DST), is Maxwell's old magic assistant Charlie, attacking the player if they're in complete darkness.

=== Story ===
The game opens with Maxwell snidely commenting on the player's gaunt appearance and includes little further story. The game's setup is told further through its trailer: on a dark and stormy night, in his house deep in a mountainous forest within New England, Wilson appears to be getting nowhere in a chemistry experiment until he is startled by his radio speaking to him. It reveals that it has noticed his trouble and has secret knowledge for him. When he eagerly agrees, a flurry of equations and diagrams encircle him and fill his head. Using white rats, a typewriter, and his blood among other tools and materials, Wilson creates a giant machine. The radio commends his work and tells him to pull the machine's switch. He hesitates, but at the radio's insistence, he does so. The machine rattles violently, and a pair of ghostly arms whisk him into a different world while an apparition of Maxwell cackles.

As Wilson (and indeed the other characters who were lured into Maxwell's door) survives, he finds that the Constant, despite at first glance resembling the real world, is not a normal plane of reality, as it is inhabited by not only creatures different from their real world counterparts, but also overall hideous and sometimes powerful monsters that are unrecognisable from anything found in the real world, and worst of all, shadow creatures materialise whenever he is feeling afraid, and deep within the caves on the mainland, Wilson is able to find the ruins of a technologically advanced race of arthropod creatures who were once the dominant species of the Constant, but destroyed themselves with the overuse of nightmare fuel that these shadow creatures are composed of.

During the Adventure mode, at the start of each chapter, Maxwell appears and comments. At first, he seems impressed at the player's hardiness; he then becomes irritated and urges the player to turn back. He offers the player a truce but, upon its decline, becomes enraged.

At the end of Adventure mode, the player reaches an island called Maxwell's Island with a hall belonging to Maxwell on it. The player finds Maxwell trapped in a throne encircled by short stone pillars. It is implied that this is a fate worse than death, and Maxwell was trying to kill the player to prevent them from meeting the same fate he has. The player is at first unable to free him but finds a keyhole and a key nearby. The player sets Maxwell free, but he turns into a skeleton and disintegrates as he stands up. The ghostly arms from the trailer then grab the player and ensnare him in the throne. An epilogue implies that the player will take on a villainous role similar to Maxwell's using newfound powers given by the throne but will nonetheless be trapped forever.

== Development ==
Don't Starve was developed and published by indie studio Klei Entertainment. The game began development as part of a 48-hour game jam in 2010. The team liked the idea but shelved it until two years later, when they had the time to flesh it out. Full development commenced in 2012, while Klei was nearing the end of the development process of Mark of the Ninja. This was during the heat of an industry trend of creating games in which players are dropped into a world with few instructions and a goal of survival. The torch of this movement was held by the 2011 sandbox game Minecraft. Member Kevin Forbes stated in an interview that Minecraft was one of the team's biggest influences, particularly its exploration elements. However, as the game was conceived as a "weird experiment", the team's main goal was to innovate in terms of gameplay and aesthetics, specifically by adding a layer of emphasis on characterization and themes. Another influence was the 2005 Nintendo DS title Lost in Blue, which contains similar supernatural elements and a day/night cycle.

The game's dark and supernatural yet cartoonish art style was influenced by the work of filmmaker Tim Burton, to which it has been frequently compared, and by writers Edward Gorey and H.P. Lovecraft. Forbes noted the team's ambition of creating something "dark and creepy." After conception of the basic game setup, Forbes penned a backstory influenced by steampunk and horror, and lead creative director Jeff Agala added comic strip-like art elements. As the game was initially envisioned as a single-player experience, and adding network features would require a complete overhaul of the game's codebase, Klei was initially against adding multiplayer gameplay. However, in December 2014, after numerous requests, Klei finally released the multiplayer version of the game titled "Don't Starve Together" on Steam Early Access after an initial closed beta release.

Development was marked by a few changes to the game's formula that would be reverted. Most notably, at one point during development, Klei wanted to add quests to the existing open gameplay. Klei shelved this idea when they realized that "having external goals is extremely counter to what is fun about the game." Nevertheless, Klei co-founder Jamie Cheng has emphasized that Klei values the freedom to try different approaches that being tied to a major publisher would not afford them.

Cheng related in an interview that Don't Starve's development taught Klei a considerable amount about the nature of the emergent gameplay that was endemic to its open and random world; Klei tries to experiment with a new genre with each project and prefers not to create sequels to any of its games. These lessons would later be used to balance the mechanics of Klei's upcoming project Invisible, Inc.

== Releases and updates ==
Klei employees argued at length about whether to release Don't Starve as a free-to-play game. Forbes stated that he "wouldn't rule it out as a business model" but that the team was not ready to make such a decision. It was, however, free in the early days of beta testing.

Don't Starve was released in beta form in 2012, a move that Klei decided on to find out "what aspects of the game players are really responding to, and [nip] usability issues in the bud." Klei's Cory Rollins has stated that he finds that most developers' beta periods simply serve as an early release of the game and result in few glitches being fixed, and wanted to make more use of the strategy. Added benefits the team discovered during beta testing were that it forced them to make important decisions about the game's upcoming release well in advance, and that it solidified a player base. In addition, Klei added the ability for food to spoil during this time, inspired by a forum thread about such possibilities. Cheng found Don't Starve to have "ended up a way better game because of the community." It spent a few months in beta testing, and Klei continued to give updates for months after its release.

In June 2013, shortly after the game's main release, a PlayStation 4 version was announced; it would not be released until January of the following year. In a January 2014 interview, Rollins mentioned internal discussions of creating a PlayStation Vita version of Don't Starve, citing massive community interest in playing it on the PlayStation 4 remotely. An iOS edition was released in July 2014. The company is also considering other mobile phone adaptations, as well as a potential sequel, but is not prioritizing them.

A PlayStation Vita port of Don't Starve titled Don't Starve: Giant Edition was announced on August 25, 2014, and was released on September 2, 2014, in North America, and September 3, 2014, in Europe. This was also announced to be released for the Wii U via the Nintendo eShop on March 4, 2015. Wii U Specific Features: Enjoy Off-TV Mode! Use companion map via the Wii U GamePad to navigate around the world "Reign of Giants" DLC available at launch. Giant Edition was released in North America on May 28, 2015, and in Europe on June 4, 2015. A PlayStation 3 port was developed by Abstraction Games and released in North America on June 23, 2015, as well as in Europe on June 24, 2015. An Xbox One version was released on August 26, 2015. Don't Starve: Pocket Edition was released on July 9, 2015, for iOS and includes the Reign of Giants DLC. The Android version was officially released on October 20, 2016.

=== Expansions ===
Don't Starve: Reign of Giants, the game's first paid downloadable content expansion, was announced on January 18, 2014. Three cryptic teasers were released, each named after a season of the year. The first, "Fall", shows a badger-like creature, while "Winter" adds an unlockable arachnid character named Webber and "Spring" a furry leg accompanied by a hatching egg. The expansion was made available as early access on April 2 and was released on May 1. It contains new items, characters, and environments.

Don't Starve: Shipwrecked, co-developed by Super Time Force studio Capybara Games, was released on PC on the first day of December 2015 in early access. This expansion includes 4 new characters, new biomes, new creatures, and new seasonal effects. These Characters include Walani, a surfer chick, Warly, a professional chef, Wilbur the monkey King, and Woodlegs the pirate captain.

Don't Starve: Hamlet was announced on September 13, 2017, and an Early Access version was released on November 8, 2018. On May 15, 2019, the DLC left Early Access. This expansion adds 3 new characters, new biomes, new bosses, a society of aristocratic Pigmen, ancient ruins, and an apocalyptic event. These characters include Wilba, the daughter of the Pig queen, Wormwood, a sentient plant, and Wheeler, an explorative aeronaut. This DLC differs drastically from typical Don't Starve gameplay with the inclusion of the Pig City, a society made up of Pigmen who use currency, known as Oincs, to trade with one another. Living within the Pig City makes survival easier, as earning and spending Oincs allows you to buy food and residency within the city. The expansions were bundled together in Don't Starve Mega Pack.

The game also saw crossovers with Terraria in 2021 and Cult of the Lamb in 2023.

== Reception ==
Reception

Aggregate scores
Aggregator	Score
GameRankings	XONE: 81%
Metacritic	PC 79/100; PS4: 78/100; WIIU: 75/100 iOS: 87/100; NS: 78/100 (Mega Pack) PS4: 82/100

Review scores
Publication	Score
Destructoid	8.5/10
Game Informer	7.5/10
GameSpot	7/10
GamesRadar+	4/5
IGN	PC: 7/10; PS4: 7.5/10
Joystiq	4.5/5
PlayStation Official Magazine – UK	9/10
Toronto Sun	3.5/5
TouchArcade	iOS: 5/5

Don't Starve received "generally favorable" reviews, according to video game review aggregator website Metacritic. The game sold one million copies by the end of 2013. Don't Starve was a finalist for the grand prize and "Excellence in Design" subcategory at the 2014 Independent Games Festival awards ceremony. It also received honorable mentions for "Excellence in Visual Art" and "Excellence in Audio."

The game's art style was critically acclaimed. Summarizing that the "distinct art style and atmosphere set a cool vibe," GameSpot's Nathan Meunier commended the atmosphere and visual design. Marty Sliva of IGN claimed an "immense appreciation for the paper-cutout graphical style and whimsical presentation", going on to praise the threatening qualities bestowed upon mundane objects by the "gothic-inspired look." Game Informer writer Jeff Marchiafava stated that "the cartoony art style makes exploring your massive, randomized world a joy." Writing for the newspaper Toronto Sun, Steve Tilley called the art "whimsical and wonderful" and the presentation in general "captivating." Reviewing the PlayStation 4 version specifically, Jordan Devore of Destructoid said that it looked and played very well on the console, though he did note some pixelation effects when the screen zooms in on the inventory. He also found that the gamepad controls, while less efficient than a keyboard, were similarly enjoyable.

The music was generally well received. Sliva compared it to carnival music and called it "immediately catchy" though lacking in variation. Giancarlo Saldana of GamesRadar called it "eerie [yet] calming" and praised its role in complementing the simultaneously lonesome and dangerous world.

Critics universally acknowledged but gave mixed opinions on the game's high level of difficulty. This sentiment was captured by Sliva's comment that "Don't Starve will never, ever hold your hand, and I both love it and hate it for that." For example, he felt some of his deaths were unfairly caused by the game's camera system obscuring needed objects. Meunier stated that "survival doesn't come easy, but there's an undeniable thrill to the challenge," but also placed the high difficulty in his list of the game's cons. Leon Hurley of Official PlayStation Magazine claimed that "learning is half the fun and even the smallest victory makes you feel like you're winning with a capital FU." Reviewers also felt that players' levels of satisfaction would depend heavily on their levels of commitment to survival.

The lack of a permanent saving mechanic and permanence of death were criticized. Marchiafava, while normally a fan of permadeath in games, found it problematic in Don't Starve because, unlike other games such as The Binding of Isaac and Spelunky, Don't Starve is much longer and so death felt like more of a loss. Meunier noted that the novelty and thrills of each new run wear off somewhat "when you're stuck tackling the same menial tasks over and over again to regain lost ground." Sliva expressed disappointment at being given "nearly no recognition from Don't Starve itself" upon being killed by a frog, and reported being bored for roughly 30 minutes at the overly familiar starts of later playthroughs. Brown thought similarly, also calling the early game in particular "a bit dull." Saldana, however, reasoned that "you at least gain some knowledge of how things work" and would make incremental, enjoyable progress.

The variety of unusual, numerous, and frequently placed ways for the player to die were singled out for praise. Focusing on the harm caused by subzero temperatures during winter, Meunier found that "these interesting wrinkles add depth and additional difficulty to the already challenging survival mechanics at play." Jessica Conditt of Joystiq praised the high number of ways to die and the game's efficient, easy-to-understand display of the player's health, hunger, and mental stability. Saldana noted that the unfamiliarity of some monster designs would help to keep the player wary.

The Pocket Edition was nominated for "Adventure Game" at the 2019 Webby Awards.

== Franchise ==
=== Don't Starve Together ===
On May 7, 2014, Klei announced that a free multiplayer expansion, Don't Starve Together, would be coming later that year. As they had initially decided not to create multiplayer, Klei clarified on their forums that they originally had not been "confident that it would actually work both in concept and implementation" but had changed their minds in response to popular demand and bringing in new help.

Don't Starve Together made its debut on Steam's Early Access program on December 15, 2014. It supports up to six players at a time, who can be either existing friends or strangers and can play in public or private games. The expansion contains most, if not all, features of the single-player game, but with ongoing balance patches being made for multiplayer. The game was released out of early access on April 21, 2016. If the game is purchased by itself, two copies are given: one for the purchaser, and one stored as a gift for a friend.

Presently, this is an altogether separate game from Don't Starve itself: like the single-player game and some of its associated DLC, DST boasts some unique characters of its own (thus far, Winona, Wortox, Wurt, Walter and Wanda); however, the DLC for Don't Starve is not compatible with its multi-player counterpart, and vice versa, although some of the NPCs and characters (thus far, Webber, Wigfrid, Warly and Wormwood) included in the Don't Starve DLC do appear in DST. Additionally, the DLC for this game is predominantly character skins that could be acquired by other means as well, such as acquiring enough spools (an in-game currency used to purchase certain clothes) to weave them.

A Nintendo Switch version was released on April 12, 2022.

Versions for iOS and Android separate from the original game were announced in 2024 to be published by Netflix, Inc. amid other Klei games joining Netflix. They were cancelled by Netflix in 2025 amid a structural change.

=== Don't Starve Elsewhere ===
Don't Starve Elsewhere was announced on April 10, 2026. The game was shown to be very similar to original Don't Starve and Don't Starve Together in gameplay, but featuring 3D environments, new character movement (such as jumping and falling), new graphic style, NPCs and items, different from the original games, with new story.
