= Crab Rave =

2018 single by Noisestorm

Single by Noisestorm

from the album Monstercat Instinct Vol. 1
- Released: 1 April 2018
- Genre: Tropical house; deep house
- Length: 2:41
- Label: Monstercat
- Songwriter: Eoin O'Broin
- Producer: Eoin O'Broin

Noisestorm singles chronology
"Escape" (2017)	"Crab Rave" (2018)	"Breakout" (2018)

Music video
- "Crab Rave" on YouTube

"Crab Rave" is a song by Irish DJ and music producer Noisestorm. Canadian record label Monstercat released it on 1 April 2018.

The song was originally released as part of the compilation album Monstercat Instinct Vol. 1, released 15 June 2018. It was later featured as part of Monstercat's Best of 2018 compilation album, released on 14 December 2018. It peaked at No. 14 on Billboard's Dance/Electronic Songs chart.

== Background and release ==
On 1 April 2018, the song was released as a digital download on international digital stores through Canadian record label Monstercat, as well as being released through various music streaming services. "Crab Rave" was featured on the compilation album titled Monstercat Instinct Vol. 1 released on 15 June 2018. The song was later featured on the yearly best-of compilation album titled Monstercat – Best Of 2018 released on 14 December 2018.

In 2015, Epic Games launched Unreal Dev Grants, a US$5 million development fund aiming to provide grants to creative projects using Unreal Engine 4. In November 2018, Epic announced that it would award a further US$800,000 to more than 30 individuals and teams, including O'Broin for his efforts in creating the music video for "Crab Rave", featuring thousands of computer-generated dancing crabs.

On 1 April 2019, Czech-based indie studio Beat Games announced that "Crab Rave" was to be released onto their virtual reality rhythm game Beat Saber. The song was intentionally released on April Fools' Day to celebrate the first anniversary of the song's original release.

== Reception ==
The song marked the first appearance of O'Broin in the US Billboard charts, with the song debuting at number 36 on the "Hot Dance/Electronic Songs" category. The song gained 1 million (US) online streams, in the week ending 22 November. The song has since become the second most popular video across both of Monstercat's YouTube channels, surpassing Monstercat: Instinct's second most popular video by 13 times. As of July 2025, the music video has gained over 363 million views on the "Monstercat: Instinct" YouTube channel.

== Internet meme ==
An animated GIF of the music video, depicting a large number of dancing crabs

"Crab Rave" was initially released as a small April Fool's Day joke, although it soon gained popularity after becoming an Internet meme due to the music video's uplifting theme and dancing crabs.

In an interview with Suzana Palyan of Billboard, O'Broin expressed his appreciation for its growing popularity, writing "It's incredibly cool to see people enjoying it for the humour and video, as well as for the music itself. I really didn't anticipate the wave of new listeners and the plethora of memes based on the original; it's very fun to see the new creative variations being made every day." The music video was developed by O'Broin using the program Unreal Engine.

O'Broin has further expressed his gratitude with the song's popularity, stating that he never expected the song to become so popular and for it to become an Internet meme, writing "Honestly, I had no idea. It just happened – and the cool thing is it happened completely by itself. I just put it out as a funny video and whoever made the 'Obama is Gone' meme kind of kicked everything off. It's fun to go around and read the latest comments because people are always making new versions of the meme and progressing it. I definitely didn't expect it."

In 2018, various remixes and edits of the song were uploaded online. In July, a version of the song overlaid with the text 'Obama is Gone' gained popularity. Originally a shitpost, this use referencing a powerful (or widely disliked) persons passing or removal from power would become a prominent use of the meme. The meme was again used during the announcement that President Trump had COVID, following his loss in the 2020 United States presidential election, and again after his suspension from Twitter following January 6th.

== In other media ==
On 1 April 2019, Noisestorm announced development of Crab Champions, a roguelike shooter based on "Crab Rave". In 2023, the game became available in early access on Steam.

"Crab Rave" was referenced in the first-person shooter Battlefield V in the multiplayer map Wake Island, based on its real-life counterpart. A tribute easter egg dedicated to fans of the Battlefield franchise featured a remix of the Battlefield theme in the style of "Crab Rave". To unlock the easter egg, players must find several crabs across the island which scurry off if the player approaches. If the player approaches enough crabs, they can access a pair of headphones which play a message in morse code from a radio station. Decoding the message reveals a set of coordinates around Wake Island where vinyl records can be found. The records play the themes from previous Battlefield games. If the player collects enough of the records, an in-game crab rave will take place, set to a remix of the Battlefield theme.

Continuing the tradition of April Fools' Day events, virtual reality rhythm game Beat Saber added the song as free playable DLC in 2019. The map was noted for its difficulty, and later in 2019, a new map of the song was added to the game, this time in 360 Degrees.

In July 2019, a leak for the free-to-play game Fortnite Battle Royale revealed a dance emote titled "Crabby" was being added to the game. It was noted by a Dot Esports editor that it was likely inspired by "Crab Rave" and was added to the game because of the song's increasingly popular music video.

In April 2021, Titan Forge Games announced a collaboration with Monstercat to add content to Smite based on multiple Monstercat artists, including Noisestorm. The character Khepri, the Ancient Egyptian scarab god, was given a "Crab Rave"-inspired skin.

During the 2023 Desert Bus for Hope fundraiser livestream, the song became a running gag among the organisers. Whenever someone mentioned a crab on camera, the song would play briefly as the entertainers danced by swaying and making pinching motions with their hands.

In January 2024, Teamfight Tactics added a gameplay variant named after Crab Rave featuring the game's crab-like characters dancing, replacing the usual non-player enemies players faced. The variant quickly gained notoriety among the playerbase for how common it was for players to lose to the crabs in later rounds where defeating the enemies was usually trivial. In March, the track was licensed and added to the game as the background music for the variant.

On 18 September 2025, Rift of the NecroDancer released a DLC pack featuring music from the record label Monstercat. One of the songs released was "Crab Rave".

== Charts ==
=== Weekly charts ===
Chart (2019)	Peak position
US Hot Dance/Electronic Songs (Billboard)	14

=== Year-end charts ===
Chart (2019)	Position
US Hot Dance/Electronic Songs (Billboard)	37

== Certifications ==
Region	Certification	Certified units/sales
New Zealand (RMNZ)	Gold	15,000^{‡}
United Kingdom (BPI)	Silver	200,000^{‡}
United States (RIAA)	Platinum	1,000,000^{‡}
^{‡} Sales+streaming figures based on certification alone.

== Release history ==
Region	Date	Format	Version	Label	Ref.
Worldwide	1 April 2018	Digital download	"Crab Rave"	Monstercat	
Worldwide	15 June 2018	Digital download	Monstercat Instinct Vol. 1	Monstercat	
Worldwide	14 December 2018	Digital download	Monstercat – Best Of 2018	Monstercat	
