= Eets =

2006 video game

- Eets: Chowdown cover art
- Developer: Klei Entertainment
- Platforms: Windows, Mac OS X, Xbox 360
- Release: Windows; March 27, 2006; Xbox 360; April 25, 2007; OS X December 9, 2010
- Genre: Puzzle-platformer
- Mode: Single-player

Eets (also known as Eets: Hunger. It's emotional.) is a puzzle video game developed by Klei Entertainment. It was released for Microsoft Windows on March 27, 2006, and for Mac OS X on December 9, 2010. Both the Windows and Macintosh versions of the game are distributed digitally via Steam. On April 25, 2007, the game was released for the Xbox 360 via Xbox Live Arcade under the title Eets: Chowdown. Eets is a puzzle game with similarities to Lemmings where players must guide a character through an on-screen puzzle.

Eets Munchies
- Developer: Klei Entertainment
- Series: Eets
- Platforms: Windows, Mac OS X, Linux, iPad
- Release: March 11, 2014 (Steam)
- Genre: Puzzle-platformer
- Mode: Single-player

Eets was reimagined as Eets Munchies. Its beta debuted as part of Humble Indie Bundle 9; the full game was subsequently released on Steam on March 11, 2014.

Both Eets and Eets: Chowdown were well received by critics. Eets holds an aggregate score of 81.75% at GameRankings, while Eets: Chowdown averages a score of 78.33% at the same site. Reviewers generally praised the game's unique art style. Opinions were divided on the subject of gameplay, with some reviewers feeling it was too difficult, and others praising the game's difficulty level.

== Gameplay ==
Eets is a puzzle game where players must guide the titular character to puzzle pieces on the game screen.

Eets combines elements of games such as Lemmings and The Incredible Machine, and adds a quirky art style and a surreal sense of humor. In the game, the player must navigate the titular character through a series of platforms to collect puzzle pieces. In order to do so the player must place a variety of items in Eets's path to help him reach his destination. Explosive mushrooms fire Eets over an arc, whales can suck objects in and then shoot them back out their spout, and gravity pills allow Eets to walk upside down.

Depending on the character's mood he reacts to stimuli differently. If Eets is angry he can jump across larger chasms, while a scared Eets will not jump at all. His mood can be changed in several ways, such as hitting him with chips from a chocolate cloud, which angers Eets. In addition to featuring over 100 levels, the official website has an additional puzzle pack that users can download, made by both fans and developers.

Eets: Chowdown is the Xbox 360 version of the game. It includes 120 new levels and an action game called Marsho Madness. The core gameplay for Chowdown is the same as the home computer versions of Eets. Marsho Madness requires quick-reflex A-B-X-Y button press combinations to protect a stationary Eets from an ever-increasing horde of Marshmallow creatures. Each type of "Marsho" moves and acts differently, demanding varied and dynamic approaches. Strategic accuracy generates combo points, multipliers, and splash damage: all key to advancing the player's score. Extra lives and consumable powerups appear incrementally the longer the player survives. In this manner, this robust minigame combines elements of rhythm, puzzle, and arcade action genres. Rewards for gameplay include three achievements, unlockable gamer pictures and leaderboard postings.

== Development ==
Eets was first announced via an online preview in June 2005. The game was originally pitched to publishers as a possible title on the Nintendo DS or PSP, but to no avail. In October 2005 Klei Entertainment met with Valve to begin negotiations to publish the game on Steam, Valve's digital distribution platform. In January 2006 the two companies decided to not go through with the deal, and Klei began distributing it via their own website. It would later be released on the Steam platform on December 21, 2006. Klei Entertainment spent three years on the title, working intermittently and going through several concepts. Once the game had reached a stable state, an additional nine months were spent on polishing the game. On January 30, 2007, a revamped version of Eets called Eets: Chowdown was announced for the Xbox 360. Chowdown was to be distributed via the Xbox Live Arcade service. It was released April 25, 2007. Two additional puzzle packs were released for Chowdown; the first on August 29, 2007, and the second on September 26, 2007. The Mac OS X version of the game, ported by Kruger Heavy Industries, was released on December 9, 2010. Music for the game was composed by Tom Chi.

== Reception ==
Eets / Eets: Chowdown

Aggregate scores
Aggregator	Score
GameRankings	81.75% (Eets); 78.33% (Chowdown)
Metacritic	81/100 (Eets); 77/100 (Chowdown)

Review scores
Publication	Score
GamesRadar+	8/10 (Chowdown)
IGN	7.4/10 (Chowdown)
PC Gamer (UK)	8/10 (Eets)
PC Gamer (US)	5.8/10 (Eets)
TeamXbox	8.5/10 (Chowdown)
The New York Times	8/10 (Eets)

Both versions of the game were well received by critics. Eets holds an aggregate score of 81.75% at GameRankings and 81/100 at Metacritic. The scores for Eets: Chowdown are slightly lower, with a 78.33% at GameRankings and a 77/100 at Metacritic. Eets: Chowdown also received an Editor's Choice award from TeamXbox's Will Tuttle. In its first weekend, Eets was downloaded over 7,500 times. Eets: Chowdown ranked eighth in Xbox Live Arcade purchases the week of its release, as well as the following week. GamesRadar's Eric Bratcher noted that with the game's 800 Microsoft Point price that it is "priced to move."

IGN's Erik Brudvig praised the humor of Eets. He stated "a nice sense of humor has been infused throughout the game." He also gave high marks for the game's art style and stated that it is one of the things "Eets does several things exceptionally well." Brudvig further praised the game's achievements. He noted that even after completion of the game, the remaining achievements encourage the players to keep playing and try different methods of completing levels. Charles Herold of The New York Times called it "an adorable puzzle game". Bryon Lloyd of Game Vortex also praised the visuals and said the game is "a beautiful game to look at with its cel-shaded cast and crew." GameSpot's Ryan Davis also enjoyed the game's visuals and noted they "have an inspired look and feel." Eric Bratcher of GamesRadar also noted it has a "splashy, fun art style." Eurogamer's Tom Bramwell was more critical of the art style. He felt that the bright, colourful graphics made it difficult to distinguish where the character was and what was happening.

The gameplay and overall difficulty of the game received mixed comments from reviewers. Brudvig felt that gameplay would occasionally drag on, but conceded that it was "a solid choice for anyone looking to get the brain juices flowing." Tuttle enjoyed the difficulty, but warned that "the majority of the puzzles occupy that zone between challenging and frustrating." He further added that the game was perfect for those looking for a challenge. Davis noted that with the number of levels in the game that players will be "[kept] entertained for hours." Bratcher expressed frustration with the fact that players cannot skip levels when unable to solve a puzzle. Bramwell felt that the game was "probably not as compelling as it might be, but that certainly has its moments."
