= The floor is lava =

Game in which players avoid touching the ground

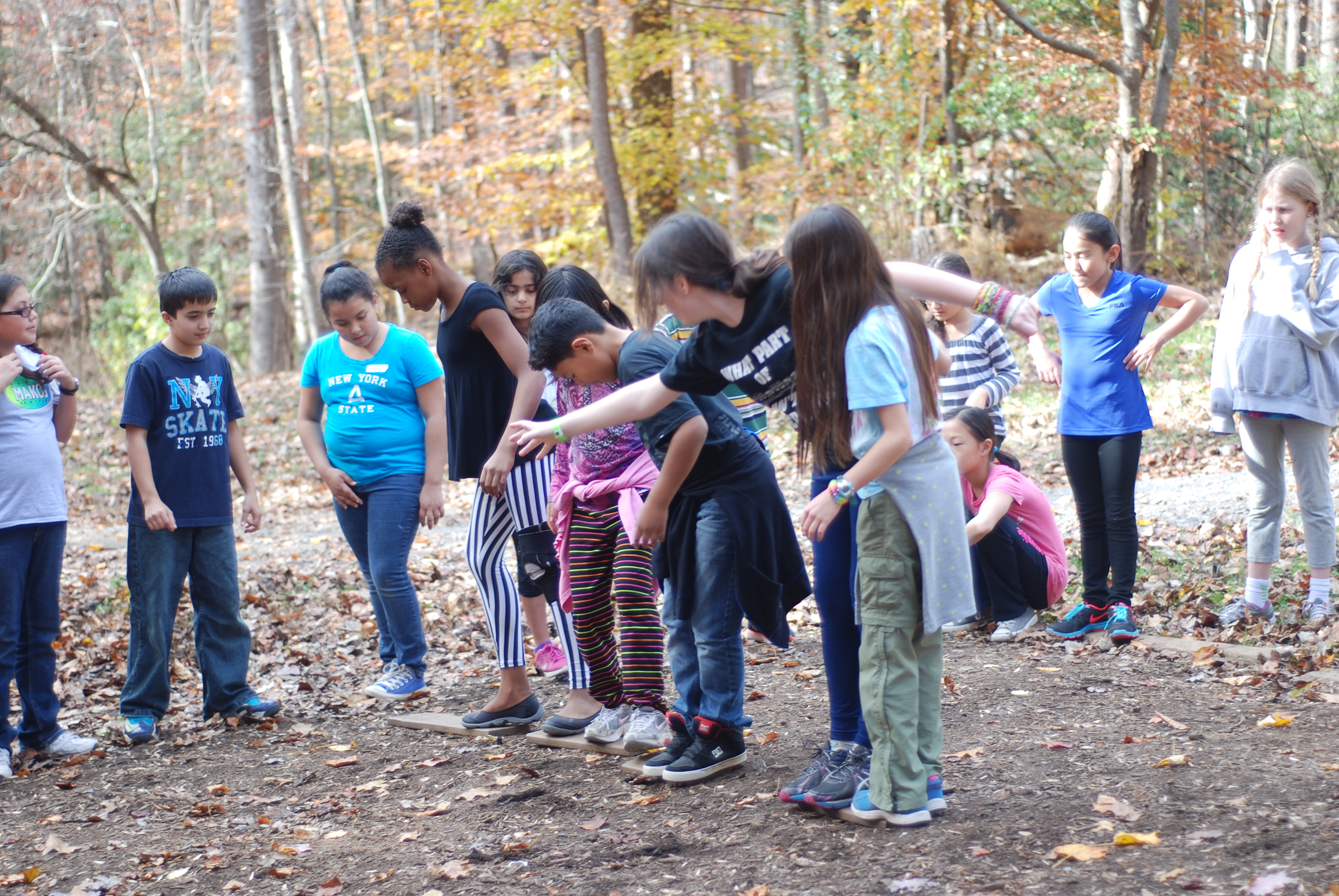
Swamp crossing game where children have to come up with a team strategy that will allow them to cross a "swamp" using limited number of portable islands (boards) without drowning (touching the ground)

The floor is lava is a game in which players pretend that the floor or ground is made of lava (or any other lethal substance, such as acid or quicksand), and thus must avoid touching the ground, as touching the ground would "kill" the player who did so. The players stay off the floor by standing on furniture or the room's architecture. The players generally may not remain still, and are required to move from one piece of furniture to the next. This is due to some people saying that the furniture is acidic, sinking, or in some other way time-limited in its use. The game can be played with a group or alone for self amusement. There may even be a goal, to which the players must race. The game may also be played outdoors in playgrounds or similar areas.

== Gameplay ==
Typically, any individual starts the game just by shouting "The floor is lava!" Any player remaining on the floor in the next few seconds would be "out".

There often are tasks, items or places that can "regenerate" lost body parts or health. Depending on the players, these could be embarrassing tasks, or simple things like finding a particular person. Players can also set up obstacles such as padded chairs to make the game more challenging; this is a variation of an obstacle course. Players may also add items to the area with the goal of adding more platforms to achieve safe passage. This may be something as simple as throwing a pillow on the ground or in more extreme cases could be full pieces of furniture.

In one version called "Hot Lava Monster", usually played on playgrounds, players must stay off the ground (sand, rubber, woodchips, etc.) and on the play equipment. The person who is playing the "monster" can be on the 'lava' with the objective of attempting to tag another player. The "monster" must try to tag or catch the other players. In some versions, the "monster" is not allowed to touch certain obstacles, such as wooden platforms or may only touch objects of a certain color. The "monster" must navigate across structures such as across playground slides, monkey bars, ropes courses, etc. instead of the main platform.

== Origin ==
A 2018 preprint on Social Science Research Network suggested the game originates from a rise of living rooms populated with furniture during late 1930s. The living room's ubiquitous nature and the game's simplicity allowed the game to rapidly spread from peer to peer.

== Adaptations into media ==
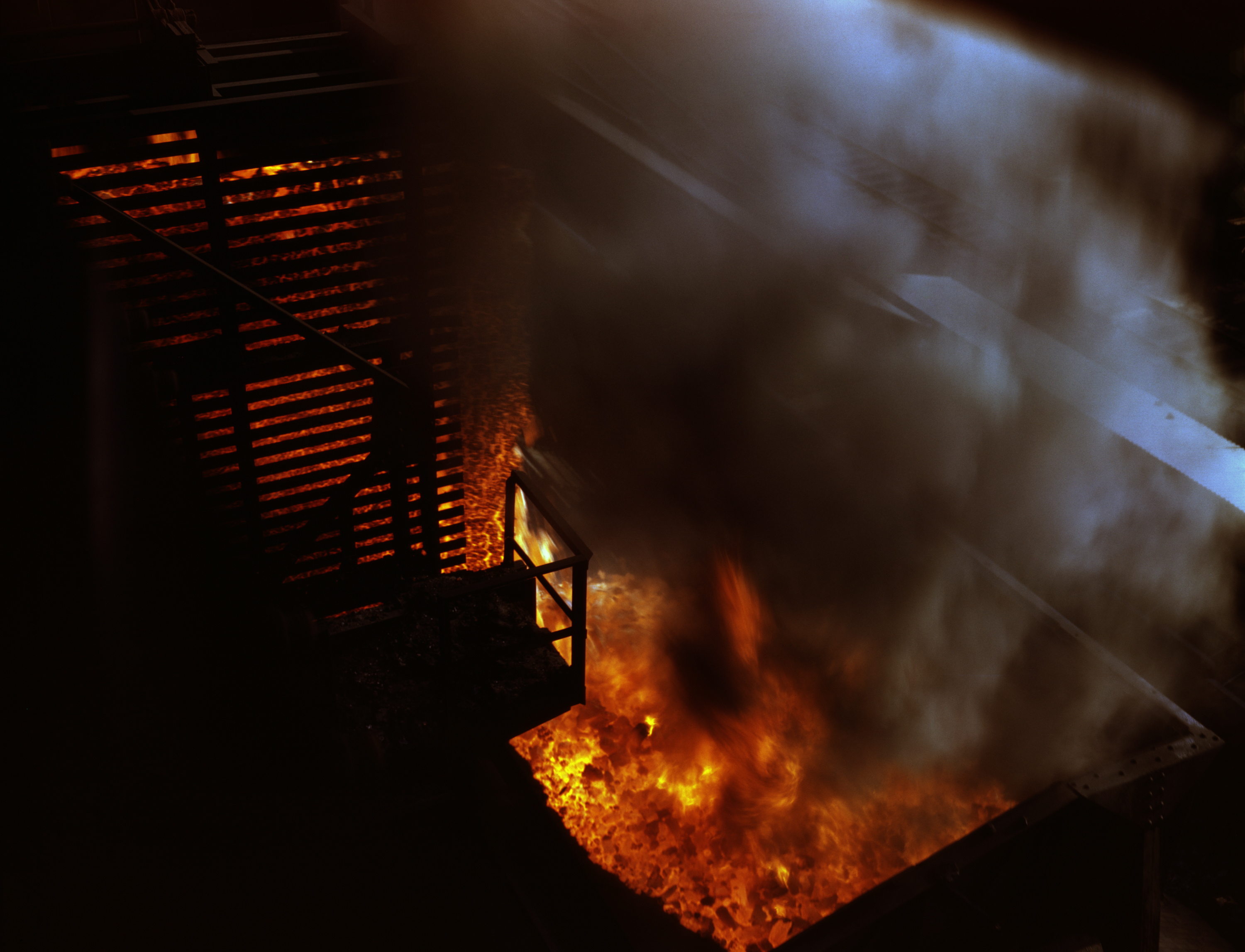
1942 image of coke being pushed into a quenching car, a rare scenario in which a floor is actually composed of molten rock. Photograph by Arthur Siegel.

An episode of television sitcom Community first aired in 2014, "Geothermal Escapism", features a competitive game of "the floor is lava" set on a community college campus. Spontaneously called by Abed Nadir (Danny Pudi) in honor of Troy Barnes' (Donald Glover) departure from the show at the end of the episode, the characters compete in the game to win a comic book worth $50,000.

The 2019 video game Hot Lava is inspired by the game, and has gameplay mechanics like ropes and wall-running.

In 2020, Netflix released a TV show based on the game called Floor Is Lava, in which three teams compete to win $10,000 in different challenges.
