= Noisestorm =

Irish music producer and DJ

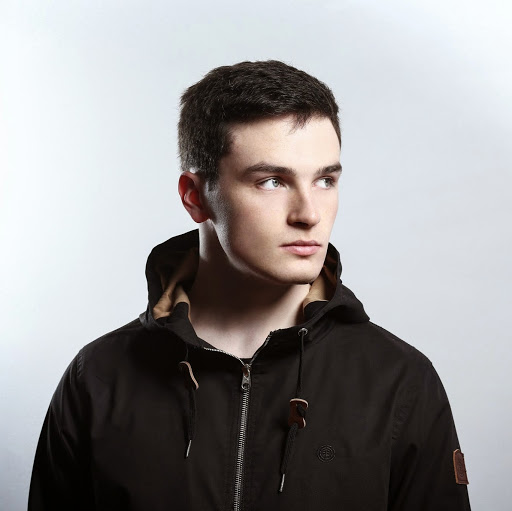

Background information
- Born: Eoin O'Broin; 1 October 1995 (age 30); Dublin, Ireland
- Genres: EDM; breakbeat; trap; crabstep; Drumstep
- Occupations: DJ; record producer
- Instruments: Piano; flute
- Years active: 2011–present
- Label: Monstercat

Eoin O'Broin (Irish pronunciation: [ˈoːnʲ oː ˈbˠɾˠɪnʲ]; born 1 October 1995), better known by his stage name Noisestorm, is an Irish DJ and music producer. He is best known for his song "Crab Rave", which peaked at 14 on Billboard's Dance/Electronic Songs chart.

== Early life ==
Noisestorm was born Eoin O'Broin on 1 October 1995 in Dublin, Ireland.

== Career ==
On 1 April 2018, O'Broin released his song "Crab Rave" on Monstercat as an April Fools' Day joke. The song gained popularity as an internet meme, with the song debuting at number 36 on Billboard's "Hot Dance/Electronic Songs" category. Following "Crab Rave", O'Broin released the song "Breakout" with English hip hop group Foreign Beggars. Critics praised the release, with Dancing Astronaut praising the mixture of rap with the synths and drops.

On 1 April 2023, O'Broin released an early access version of his first video game on Steam, titled "Crab Champions", which he created following the popularity of "Crab Rave". This game includes its own original soundtrack, which he plans to later release on music streaming services.

== Discography ==
=== Extended plays ===
| Title | Details |
|---|---|
| Ignite EP | Released: 1 May 2011; Label: Self-released; Format: Digital download |
| Solar EP | Released: 1 August 2011; Label: Self-released; Format: Digital download |
| Renegade EP | Released: 1 February 2012; Label: Monstercat; Format: Digital download |
| Surge EP | Released: 12 March 2014; Label: Monstercat; Format: Digital download |

==== As a featured artist ====
| Title | Details |
|---|---|
| Some Wobbles EP (Ephixa) | Released: 29 July 2011; Label: Monstercat; Format: Digital download |
| Bring the Madness (The Remixes) (Excision and Pegboard Nerds) | Released: 23 March 2015; Label: Monstercat; Format: Digital download |

=== Charted singles ===
| Title | Year | Peak chart positions | Certifications | Album |
| Title | Year | US Dance | Certifications | Album |
|---|---|---|---|---|
| "Crab Rave" | 2018 | 14 | BPI: Silver; RIAA: Platinum | Monstercat Instinct Vol. 1 |

=== Other singles ===
| Title | Year | Album | Label |
|---|---|---|---|
| Shockwave | 2011 | Non-album single | Self-released |
| Airwaves | 2011 | Monstercat 002 – Early Stage | Monstercat |
| Full Focus | 2011 | Monstercat 003 – Momentum | Monstercat |
| Wipeout | 2011 | Monstercat Christmas Album 2011 | Monstercat |
| Breakdown | 2012 | Monstercat 007 – Solace | Monstercat |
| Timewarp | 2012 | Monstercat 009 – Reunion | Monstercat |
| Together | 2013 | Monstercat 013 – Awakening | Monstercat |
| Eclipse | 2013 | Monstercat 014 – Discovery | Monstercat |
| Surge | 2014 | Monstercat 017 – Ascension | Monstercat |
| Breakdown VIP | 2014 | Monstercat 018 – Frontier | Monstercat |
| Sentinel | 2014 | Monstercat 019 – Endeavour | Monstercat |
| Barracuda | 2015 | Monstercat 022 – Contact | Monstercat |
| Heist | 2015 | Monstercat 024 – Vanguard | Monstercat |
| Antihero | 2016 | Monstercat 026 – Resistance | Monstercat |
| Leaving Now | 2016 | Monstercat 027 – Cataclysm | Monstercat |
| This Feeling | 2016 | Monstercat 5 Year Anniversary | Monstercat |
| Escape | 2017 | Monstercat Uncaged Vol. 1 | Monstercat |
| Breakout (feat. Foreign Beggars) | 2018 | Monstercat Uncaged Vol. 6 | Monstercat |
