= Oxygen Not Included =

2019 video game

- Developer: Klei Entertainment
- Publisher: Klei Entertainment
- Composer: Vince de Vera
- Engine: Unity
- Platforms: Linux; macOS; Microsoft Windows
- Release: July 30, 2019
- Genres: Survival, simulation
- Mode: Single-player

Oxygen Not Included is a 2019 survival simulation video game developed and published by Klei Entertainment. After being released on Steam's early access since February 2017, the game was officially released on July 30, 2019.

== Gameplay ==
Oxygen Not Included is a simulation survival game. At the start of a new game, three colonists (referred to as duplicants) find themselves in an asteroid with isolated pockets of breathable atmosphere, with no memory of how they got there. The player is tasked with managing and taking care of these duplicants as they try to survive and create a sustainable makeshift space colony. The player must monitor the duplicants' hunger, waste, and oxygen levels to keep them alive. Each game's world is procedurally generated. The world is subdivided into various regions or "biomes" that contain different and often biome-specific materials and "critters," various alien animals. While initial areas have a breathable atmosphere, subsequent areas are in a vacuum or lack oxygen, requiring proper preparation by the duplicants before they explore these areas. The world also contains hazards, such as diseases and extreme temperatures. The game simulates the diffusion of gases and equalization of atmospheres when a new natural chamber is opened, which can cause oxygen levels to drop in existing chambers, as well as the draining of liquids by gravity.

To help establish the colony, the player directs the duplicants to perform certain tasks, such as mining for resources, growing food, crafting equipment, researching new technologies, and maintaining their own health through nourishment, rest, and hygiene. The player does not control the duplicants directly, and instead provides prioritized instructions, which the duplicants will then follow to the best of their abilities. For example, the player can order a conduit of wire to be built. This will cause the duplicants to collect the materials to make the wire, clear away any materials around the conduit's path, and then construct the wire. If the duplicants cannot access a source of the specified material for the wire, the task will remain uncompleted as the duplicants go to complete other tasks they can do. Duplicants have stats that determine how effective they are at certain tasks, and will prioritize tasks that they are best at. These duplicants' skills can be improved over time and practice.

== Development and release ==
Oxygen Not Included is developed by Vancouver-based indie studio Klei Entertainment. The game was announced for Windows during the PC Gaming Show at the Electronic Entertainment Expo 2016. It was also revealed that the game would come to macOS and Linux. An in-development version of the game was made available via early access on February 15, 2017. The game was originally stated to leave early access on May 28, 2019, but was pushed back to July 2019. Klei also announced plans to make downloadable content for the game. DLC has since been added, such as the free Automation Innovation update (extending the current automation system, adding equipment such as ribbon cables) and the paid Spaced Out update (adding a radiation system, uranium refinement, and bee ranching). Klei has stated that there will be no more DLCs for Oxygen Not Included going forward, opting for free updates instead. That being said, the game then released four extra DLC packs years later: The Frosty Planet Pack on July 19, 2024,, The Bionic Booster Pack on December 13, 2024, The Prehistoric Planet Pack on June 12, 2025, and The Aquatic Planet Pack on June 11, 2026.

Klei's Johann Seidenz said that games such as Dwarf Fortress, Prison Architect, and The Sims influenced the design of Oxygen Not Included.

== Reception ==
=== Reviews ===
Reception

Aggregate score
Aggregator	Score
Metacritic	86/100

Review scores
Publication	Score
GameStar	87/100
GameCentral	8/10

The review aggregation website Metacritic determined that Oxygen Not Included received generally favorable reviews from critics.

Nate Crowley, writing for Rock Paper Shotgun praised the game's design and progression, but questioned the ever-growing complexity as a deterrent to more casual gamers, especially those without backgrounds in science and engineering. GameCentral also gave the game positive reviews, with a total 8/10, praising the scientific accuracy as well as the design, but raising concerns about the difficulty, especially with the lack of in-game learning tools.

=== Accolades ===
Oxygen Not Included was nominated for "Strategy/Simulation Game of the Year" at the 23rd Annual D.I.C.E. Awards, and for "Strategy/Simulation" at the 2020 Webby Awards.

== Legacy ==
Away Team, a survival crafting game set in the world of Oxygen Not Included, was announced in June 2025. In April 2026, Klei showcased multiplayer functionality and announced a playtest.
