= Klei Entertainment =

Canadian video game developer

Klei Entertainment Inc.
- Type: Subsidiary
- Industry: Video games
- Founded: July 2005; 21 years ago
- Headquarters: Vancouver, British Columbia, Canada
- Key people: Jamie Cheng; Jeffrey Agala
- Products: Don't Starve; Oxygen Not Included; Hot Lava; Mark of the Ninja; Shank; Shank 2
- Number of employees: ~100
- Parent: Tencent (2021–present)
- Website: klei.com

Klei Entertainment Inc. (/kleɪ/ KLAY) is a Canadian video game development company located in Vancouver, British Columbia. Klei was formed in July 2005 by Jamie Cheng. Their best-known titles include Don't Starve and Oxygen Not Included.

On January 25, 2021, Klei became a subsidiary of the Chinese holding conglomerate Tencent.

== History ==
Jamie Cheng founded Klei Entertainment in July 2005. Prior to the formation of Klei, Cheng worked as a specialist AI programmer at Relic Entertainment, formerly owned by THQ. Cheng sought a company culture where employees live balanced lives, building Klei on the belief that game studios could make popular, interesting games with a reasonable budget, normal hours, and a fair price while still being successful. Cheng acquired seed funding for Klei by selling his THQ shares earned at Relic and getting a $10,000 loan from his brother. With the initial funding secured, Cheng partnered with Jeffrey Agala to become co-founder and Creative Director at the studio. In 2009, Klei had 11 employees and as of May 2013, it had grown to 35 employees.

Their first title, Eets, was first released on March 27, 2006, for Microsoft Windows, then for Mac OS X on December 9, 2010. Between those two releases, the game was ported to the Xbox 360 via the Xbox Live Arcade platform and released on April 25, 2007. Retitled to Eets: Chowdown, this version featured 120 new levels and an action minigame called Marsho Madness.

The company assisted with Slick Entertainment's N+, the Xbox Live Arcade port of the Adobe Flash game N. In 2008, Klei developed Sugar Rush, a casual massively multiplayer online game. They announced in late August 2010, that development had stopped and the game had been canceled. The company's fourth original title, Shank, was announced at Penny Arcade Expo 2009. It was released on August 24, 2010, for the PlayStation 3, August 25, 2010, for the Xbox 360, and October 26, 2010, for Microsoft Windows.

Klei's survival adventure game Don't Starve was released on April 23, 2013. Don't Starve was released in a 2-for-1 beta format on Steam, allowing players to purchase two copies of the game for the price of one. Before it was officially self-published, Klei sold more than 300,000 copies of Don't Starve at a price of $15 each. On April 21, 2016, Klei released a stand-alone multiplayer version of Don't Starve called Don't Starve Together, which has regular updates and individual downloadable content. On April 9, 2026, Klei announced a new entry to the series, Don't Starve Elsewhere.

On July 2, 2013, it was announced that its next release would be titled Invisible, Inc., a turn-based espionage game released on May 12, 2015.

In 2017, Klei Entertainment acquired Slick Entertainment. Slick founder Nick Waanders and CEO Jamie Cheng previously worked together at Relic Entertainment, which established a working relationship that later allowed the companies to merge.

Klei announced in January 2021 that it had agreed to allow Tencent to acquire a majority stake in the company. Klei would remain in full control of its products, but the Tencent acquisition would help it reach the gaming market in China.

== Games ==
=== Games Developed ===
Year	Title	Platform(s)	Notes
2006	Eets	Mac OS X, Windows, Xbox 360	
2008	N+	PlayStation Portable, Xbox 360, Nintendo DS	Engine only
2010	Sugar Rush	Windows	Cancelled
2010	Shank	Linux, Mac OS X, Windows, PlayStation 3, Xbox 360	
2012	Shank 2	Linux, Mac OS X, Windows, PlayStation 3, Xbox 360	
2012	Mark of the Ninja	Linux, Mac OS X, Windows, Xbox 360	
2013	Don't Starve	Linux, Mac OS X, Windows, PlayStation 3, PlayStation 4, PlayStation Vita, Xbox One, Nintendo Switch, Wii U, iOS, Android	
2014	Eets Munchies	Linux, Mac OS X, Windows, iOS	
2015	Invisible, Inc.	Linux, Mac OS X, Windows, PlayStation 4, iOS	
2016	Don't Starve Together	Linux, Mac OS X, Windows, PlayStation 4, Xbox One, Nintendo Switch	
2018	Mark of the Ninja: Remastered	Linux, Mac OS X, Windows, PlayStation 4, Xbox One, Nintendo Switch	
2019	Oxygen Not Included	Linux, Mac OS X, Windows	Early access: 2017; Released: 2019
2019	Hot Lava	Linux, Mac OS X, Windows, iOS	
2021	Griftlands	Linux, Mac OS X, Windows, PlayStation 4, Xbox One, Nintendo Switch	Early access: 2019; Released: 2021
2026	Rotwood	Windows, Nintendo Switch 2	Early access: 2024 Released: 2026
TBA	Dread Pilots	Windows	Early access: 2024
TBA	Away Team	Windows	
TBA	Don't Starve Elsewhere	Windows	

=== Games Published ===
Year	Title	Developer	Platform(s)	Notes
2015	Crypt of the NecroDancer	Brace Yourself Games	Windows, Linux, OS X	
2025	Rift of the NecroDancer	Brace Yourself Games	Windows, Nintendo Switch	
2025	Mind Over Magic	Sparkypants	Windows	Early access: 2023
2025	Lab Rat	Chump Squad	Windows, Xbox Series X/S	
TBA	Beastieball	Wishes Ultd.	Windows	Early access: 2024
