= Shank 2 =

2012 video game

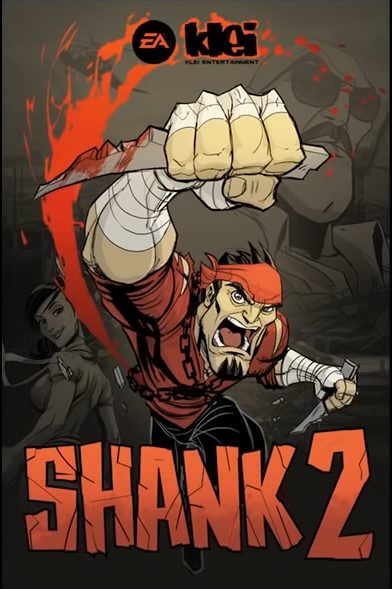
- Developer: Klei Entertainment
- Publisher: Electronic Arts
- Platforms: Linux, Mac OS X, Microsoft Windows, PlayStation 3, Xbox 360
- Release: PlayStation 3, Windows; February 7, 2012; Xbox 360; February 8, 2012; Linux, macOS; February 19, 2012
- Genre: Hack and slash
- Modes: Single-player, multiplayer

Shank 2 is a 2D side-scrolling hack and slash video game developed by Canadian independent studio Klei Entertainment and published by Electronic Arts in 2012. As the sequel to Shank, it features a new two-player survival mode, updated combat mechanics, and new weapons. Shank 2 does not feature the cooperative story mode which appears in the previous installment, instead offering a two player survival mode.

== Plot ==
After the death of cartel leader Cesar at the end of the first game, Shank's homeland has been engulfed by warfare as various factions attempt to take control. General Magnus has emerged victorious, and his militia now rules with an iron fist. They have overthrown the government and Magnus has declared himself president, taking over much of the cartel's criminal activities.

The rebellion against the militia is being led by Shank's old mentor, Elena. At the game's opening she is kidnapped by the militia's forces; unbeknownst to the majority of the population, Magnus is gravely ill, and he needs a heart transplant if he is to survive. He intends to take Elena's heart, a process which will kill her. Shank must fight his way through Magnus's army in order to rescue his mentor and once more overthrow a despot.

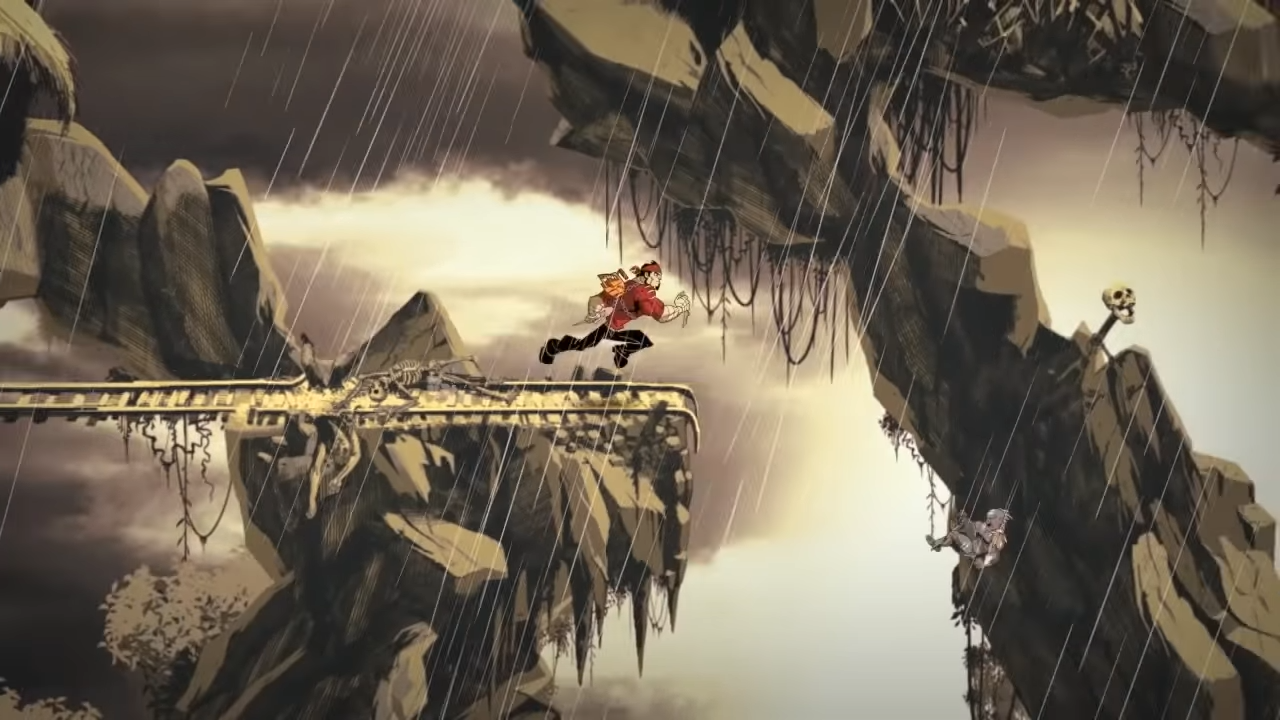
Gameplay of Shank 2

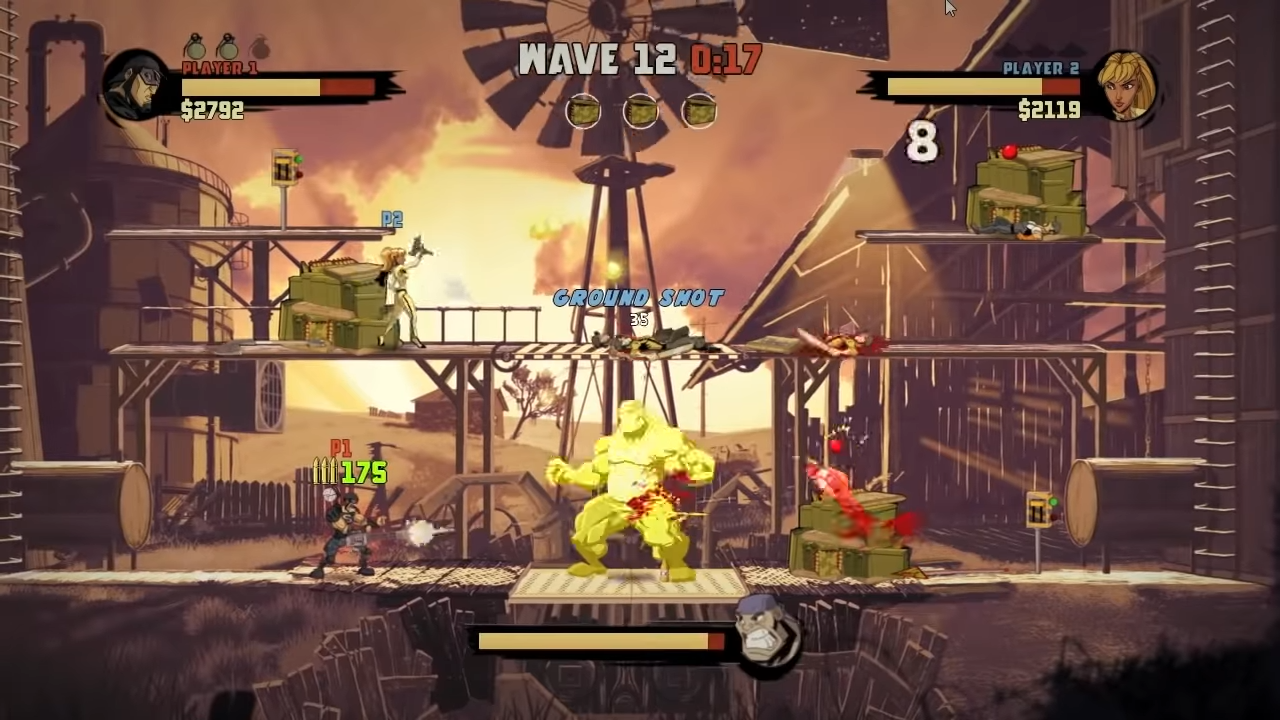
Online gameplay

== Gameplay ==
Like the first game in the series, Shank 2 is a side scrolling hack and slash with a comic book art style. The player once more controls Shank, using his three different weapon types: a set of knives, a heavy melee weapon and a ranged weapon. The player can collect temporary-use weaponry from fallen enemies, such as crates, fish and cleavers, and also has a supply of munitions, which expands upon the original game, which featured only grenades, by also providing Molotov cocktails and proximity mines, which are selectable depending on player preference and availability mid-stage.

Shank has other attacks such as multiple grapple attacks, the ability to throw enemies, and a pounce maneuver, in which he jumps in the air and lands on a nearby enemy. A major addition to the game is the ability to perform counterattacks, in which Shank turns an enemy's attack against them, for example by grabbing a baseball bat midswing and striking the enemy with it, or twisting a pistol around so the enemy is shot instead of the player.

The multiplayer portion of Shank 2 is a survival mode in which two players face off against an endless succession of enemy units, whilst defending supply stations from occasional enemy demolitions men.

Shank 2 features a far more zoomed-out camera positioning than the original, meaning combat areas are larger and allow for more mobility within the flow of combat. Furthermore, whilst the original game featured a stand-in-place Block state and a large number of static moves during which the player was invincible, Shank 2 removes the mid-action invulnerability and static dodge, forcing the player to rely on timed rolls and mobile evasion. Enemy variety has been greatly increased from the original, including small-sized enemies.

Shank 2 also features a playable female character, Corina, who features in both story missions and Survival mode. Her animations and combat styles differ from Shank's. Though she still uses the same arsenal of two knives, a heavy weapon, and a ranged weapon, her choices are different. In general, her style uses faster but weaker attacks, and involves acrobatic motions over brute strength.

== Development ==
Klei Entertainment's Jamie Cheng said: "What we did was rip the game apart and reconstruct it to allow us to have more responsive controls and better graphics. We tore our combat system apart... and created new controls to be able to use the enemies' weapons against themselves."

== Reception ==
Reception

Review score
Publication	Score
GamesRadar+	3.5/5

Shank 2 has received mostly favorable reviews, holding a Metacritic score of 72% for PC and 77 out of a 100 for PS3 and Xbox 360, respectively.

Aggregator GameRankings scored the game a bit differently, that way, Xbox 360 version got 78 out of a 100, PS3 ranked the highest of the three at 79, while PC version got the lowest at 71.

Mitch Dyer of IGN called it "one of the best action games in recent memory".
