= Shank (video game) =

2010 video game

- Cover art featuring Jeff Agala
- Developer: Klei Entertainment
- Publisher: Electronic Arts
- Directors: Jeff Agala; Gary Lam
- Designers: Jeff Agala; Jamie Cheng; Daniel Yu
- Programmers: Alex Colbert; Chris Costa; Kevin Forbes
- Artists: Jeff Agala; Aaron Bouthillier; Meghan Shaw
- Writer: Marianne Krawczyk
- Composers: Vincent DeVera; Jason Garner
- Platforms: Linux, Mac OS X, Microsoft Windows, PlayStation 3, Xbox 360
- Release: PlayStation 3, Xbox 360: NA: August 24, 2010 (PS3); WW: August 25, 2010; Windows: NA: October 25, 2010; EU: October 26, 2010; OS X October 23, 2012; Linux; May 23, 2013
- Genre: Hack and slash
- Modes: Single-player, multiplayer

Shank is a 2D side-scrolling hack and slash video game developed by Canadian independent studio Klei Entertainment and published by Electronic Arts in 2010. In December 2011, it was re-released as part of the collection Humble Indie Bundle 4.

The game features melee and ranged combat, as well as acrobatic gameplay. Its plot was penned by the God of War series' co-writer Marianne Krawczyk and tells the tale of the ex-hitman Shank's quest for revenge in the single-player campaign, also featuring a prequel story in the form of a cooperative multiplayer campaign for two players.

Shank received mixed reviews, but generally positive reception overall. Critics generally praised the art style of both the gameplay and cutscenes, however some critics felt the game had uneven level design and repetitive gameplay. The game was commercially successful, selling tens of thousands of copies and remaining in the top 20 Xbox Live Arcade games during September 2010. It was followed by a sequel, Shank 2, released in 2012 for the same gaming platforms as the first game.

== Gameplay ==
Shank gameplay screenshot, featuring a boss battle from the single-player campaign.

Shank is a side-scrolling hack and slash with a comic book art style. In the game the player controls Shank, an ex-mob hitman. The game features three main types of weaponry: a pair of knives, heavy melee weapons (the starting one is a chainsaw) and firearms (the starting one is a pair of pistols). Each weapon is assigned to a controller button, and the attacks can be combined to perform various combos. The player can collect temporary-use weaponry from fallen enemies, such as machine guns, rifles and hand grenades.

Shank has other attacks such as multiple grapple attacks, throw enemies, and is able to perform a pounce maneuver, in which he jumps in the air and lands on a nearby enemy. Some acrobatic abilities can also be performed, such as swinging from lampposts or other tall structures, and running along the front of things such as billboards. On-screen enemies each have a health bar that displays on the player's HUD, akin to Final Fight.

Shank features a cooperative campaign designed to be played locally, which is a prequel to the single-player campaign. The multiplayer allows players to play as Shank and his partner-in-crime named Falcone. In this mode players are often required to work as a team to accomplish objectives, such as defeating level bosses. Players can combine moves for special attacks with the characters performing together. Also available is the ability to revive a fallen teammate should they die in combat.

== Plot ==
The story of Shank is told in two parts, single-player campaign, and a cooperative campaign, which serves as a prelude to the former. It follows the character Shank (voiced by Marcel Davis) from his time as a hitman in the mob through his revenge on the same mob for the murder of his girlfriend Eva (voiced by Becky Poole).

=== Cooperative campaign ===
The cooperative campaign begins with Shank and his partner and fellow hitman Falcone (voiced by Gavin Cummins) as they head to Cassandra's (voiced by Sheila Goold) strip club, which has been overrun by a biker gang. As they arrive she is kidnapped by the biker leaders, Denny and Dusty. Shank and Falcone chase them to a back alley and kill Dusty, leaving Denny for Cassandra to torture. The pair then head to a wrestling match that their mob boss Cesar had rigged. The Butcher (voiced by Dave White) was supposed to lose the fight, but the wrestler instead decides to defeat his opponent El Raton. Shank and Falcone are ordered to teach the Butcher a lesson. Later, Cesar phones the two hitmen and asks them to go and oppose a priest and the members of his congregation. They succeed in kidnapping the priest, Father Gomez (voiced by Steve Lange), taking him to Cesar (voiced by Dave White) and his cousin Angelo (voiced by Tim Gouran). Angelo shoots the priest in the face, much to Shank's disapproval; he then dons the dead priest's garments and takes his place in order to make the murder go undetected.

Afterward, Falcone calls Shank about an important hit: the deputy mayor is in town and he must be eliminated. By taking him out, the mob will be able to gain control. Shank and Falcone kill the deputy's final bodyguard, and are about to take the deputy out when Eva is taken hostage. Suddenly Shank is full of doubt, and is not able to pull the trigger. Rudy (voiced by David Goldstein), Cesar's personal assistant and guard, kills the deputy mayor, threatening to kill Eva since she's deemed as a nuisance and a witness. Shank quickly dives in front of her and kills him. Realizing they must flee, Eva and Shank drive off into the sunset. The player then hears the voice of Cesar who tells his assassins to find and kill them.

=== Single-player campaign ===
In between the events of the two campaigns, Cesar sends the Butcher, Cassandra, and Angelo to kill Eva and Shank. Though Shank manages to scar Cassandra's right eye, he is ultimately defeated, as the Butcher kidnaps and kills Eva, while Angelo leaves Shank to burn alive in his home.

The single player campaign begins 6-7 years later, as Shank, presumed dead, returns to town seeking vengeance on the mob. He enters a bar looking for the Butcher, but is recognized by the bartender, who informs Cesar of Shank's return. Cesar then puts a bounty on Shank, leading to every gang in the city attempting to kill Shank. Shank manages to survive, and goes to a wrestling match where the Butcher is said to be fighting. Shank decapitates the Butcher, but discovers that it is actually El Raton in disguise. He interrogates the referee to discover the Butcher's real location.

Shank boards a cartel-run train, and, after crashing it on the way, arrives at the Butcher's hideout in the meat processing district. The Butcher taunts Shank, stating that he enjoyed killing Eva, leading to a fight which ends Shank finally choking the Butcher with a chain. He then makes his way to Club Stardust, a strip club owned by Cassandra. Shank meets with Cassandra, who reveals Cesar fired her after Shank scarred her. Shank kills her and escapes Club Stardust. In a nearby bar, he encounters a man from the Venom gang named Mello (voiced by Eric Reidman).

He convinces Mello to lead him to Angelo, only for Mello to instead force Shank to fight Denny, who after Cassandra's torture, has become a deranged gimp. Shank kills Denny and chases after Mello, severing his left arm. Shank tells him to send Angelo the message that he's coming, while following the trail of blood left by Mello which leads to a church, which serves as Angelo's hideout. As Shank fights through the church, Angelo attacks him with a rocket launcher. Shank battles him, gaining the upper hand, but Angelo fires a rocket causing a church bell to fall on Shank, knocking him unconscious. He wakes up strapped to an electric chair, face to face with Cesar. After Cesar leaves Shank frees himself, then ties Angelo to the chair and electrocutes him to death.

Shank pursues Cesar to his villa, where the final showdown begins. As they fight, it is revealed that Shank would have obeyed the order to kill Eva, but upon arriving Eva revealed that she was carrying his child. Shank explains that Cesar had always taught him the importance of family and so he did not kill her. Cesar replies that if he had known that information, things could have gone differently. As the fight nears its end, Shank is stabbed and shot multiple times in the chest. Despite this, he still manages to kill Cesar. The game ends as Shank walks towards the sunset, his revenge fulfilled.

== Development and marketing ==
A concept art of the character Falcone. Some character designs were created first on paper, then designed via computer.

Development for Shank began in January 2009. The idea for the game was created by Jeff Agala and Klei Entertainment CEO Jamie Cheng. Cheng described it as an "ode to Double Dragon with a Tarantino film feel to it." The story was written by God of War co-creator Marianne Krawczyk. Character designs were first created as paper drawings before being recreated via computer. Agala served as the game's creative director and was responsible for the primary design of the characters. Klei Entertainment artist Meghan Shaw was responsible for conceptualizing the level design for the game. The team used a combination of level and effects tools along with a custom flash pipeline for the animators to build assets in. The majority of the character animation was done by artist Aaron Bouthillier. The animation team was composed mainly of cartoon animators, making the flash asset pipeline more intuitive and production faster. Lighting in the game is also dynamic, with characters becoming darker when away from light sources, or appearing as silhouettes against a sunset background. The art style was influenced by Golden Age comics, Saturday morning cartoons and graphic novels.

The game was publicly announced at Penny Arcade Expo on September 4, 2009. On August 5, 2010, Klei Entertainment announced that they would release Shank original soundtrack for free to download on their official website, if 1,500 people joined their community on Facebook. They reached their goal in three hours. Subsequently, the full soundtrack was remastered to be "suitable for consumption" and released free of charge on August 23, 2010. As a cross promotion for the game, the titular character from DeathSpank is available as one of Shank's alternate costumes.

== Reception ==
Shank

Aggregate scores
Aggregator	Score
GameRankings	75.86% (PS3); 76.33% (PC); 75.11% (X360)
Metacritic	75/100 (PS3); 67/100 (PC); 71/100 (X360)

Review scores
Publication	Score
1Up.com	A
GameSpot	6.5/10
GameTrailers	6.6/10
IGN	7/10
Joystiq	4.5/5

Shank received mixed reviews from critics, but generally positive reception overall. The PlayStation 3 version holds a score of 75.86% at GameRankings, while the PC version holds a score of 76.33% and the Xbox 360 version a 75.11%. Metacritic reports similar scores, with the PlayStation 3 version averaging 75/100, the PC version 74/100, and the Xbox 360 version averaging 71/100.

Reviewers were universal in praising the game's art style. 1UP.com's Scott Sharkey called it "gorgeously, fluidly animated, in both its cut-scenes and within the actual gameplay." Joystiq's Justin McElroy stated "animations are so smooth between attacks that you scarcely get to enjoy snuffing out one human life before you're on to stabbing the next soon-to-be-ghost." Tom Mc Shea of GameSpot agreed, adding "colorful visuals and well-crafted cutscenes add a lot to the experience." Mc Shea also praised the cooperative campaign, stating it was the best aspect of the game. Sharkey further praised the cooperative campaign for its inclusion of a separate story, complete with cutscenes.

The game's gore and graphic display received mixed reception among critics. GamesRadar's Carolyn Gudmundson called it "embarrassing attempt at 'Mature' rating." McElroy was more forgiving, stating that the blood and gore has "a great Americanime, Samurai Jack-esque style that makes the murder look cool but never so real that you wonder about the families of the people you're beating to death." Sharkey expressed approval, stating Shank is "bloody, violent, adolescently indulgent, and absolutely beautiful in execution." Shea stated it is "a savage game that revels in the brutality of street fighting." A review by GameTrailers called Shank "a savage Saturday morning cartoon filled with blood, boobs and Berettas."

While some reviewers gave high marks for the game's control scheme and responsiveness, others expressed frustration with the same issues. Sharkey lauded the controls, saying they were "split-second responsive even with the absurd amount of lovingly rendered action happening on screen." Mc Shea criticized the controls, stating that they were inconsistent and did not respond at given times. Gudmundson echoed these comments, citing similar control issues. IGN's Arthur Gies was critical of the short three-hour campaign. GameTrailers' review likened the game to a cartoon series, then called it a "short season, [...] one that you can finish in a single sitting."

Over 9,200 units were sold on the Xbox 360 in the first week after the game's release, (Note: Sales data for the first week was driven from the game's leaderboards, which only post a score once players complete the game, so actual sales are likely to be higher for this week.) and in August 2010 alone Shank sold 41,000 units on the Xbox 360. It also remained in the top 20 Xbox Live Arcade games for the month of September 2010. The game won the Canadian Game Development Talent Awards' "Animator of the Year" award for Aaron Bouthillier, and was also nominated for the 2010 Independent Games Festival's award for "Excellence in Visual Arts" and the Canadian Game Development Talent Awards' "Visual Artist of the Year" (for Jeff Agala).

== Sequel ==
The sequel was released in February 2012 for the same platforms (Microsoft Windows, PlayStation 3 and Xbox 360), also developed by Klei Entertainment and published by Electronic Arts. Shank 2 features a new multiplayer survival mode, updated combat mechanics and new weapons. Contrarily to the first game, Shank 2 lacks a cooperative story mode, instead offering a two-player survival mode. Klei Entertainment's Jamie Cheng said: "What we did was rip the game apart and reconstruct it to allow us to have more responsive controls and better graphics. We tore our combat system apart... and created new controls to be able to use the enemies' weapons against themselves."

The sequel takes place after the events of the original Shank. With his mentor figure Cesar dead, Shank heads back home to find that the cartels have been replaced by a military regime and his foster family is fighting to oppose the general who is slowly dying. These events have forced him to take a cruel but expedient measure to deal with the cartels. When Shank attempts to break past a military checkpoint, he becomes embroiled in a battle between the rebels and the army.
