= Sugar Rush (video game) =

- Developer: Klei Entertainment
- Publisher: Nexon
- Release: Cancelled
- Genre: Fighting

Sugar Rush is a cancelled massively multiplayer online game from Klei Entertainment. It was the first game to be developed in North America to be released by Nexon, before it was later revealed that it would no longer be published.

== Gameplay ==
During beta testing, players could be a ninja, brawler or morph. The main object of the game was to get the most coins, gained by battling other players. There were four games that could be played. The first one was Robot Battle in which a team of up to four players fight robots which respawn; the difficulty could be adjusted to four different strengths.

== Development ==
Gameplay in Sugar Rush

Sugar Rush was developed in Vancouver by Klei Entertainment. In May 2008, when Min Kim, Nexon's director of game operations, was interviewed at Ten Ton Hammer he stated that a game was in development in a Vancouver Studio.

The Second Closed Beta for Sugar Rush started on the November 20 and finished on the December 4 of the same year, but Nexon closed its North American development studio, Humanature in March 2009 and the future of Sugar Rush was in question since then. The only information provided about the game's future was a message posted on the developer's blog on by Klei Entertainment CEO Jamie Cheng. He revealed that despite the shutdown of Nexon Publishing North America, they had a good relationship with Nexon during the difficult transition and that Klei had retained the rights to Sugar Rush.

By July 2009, Nexon began preparations to close the Sugar Rush website, ceasing to publish the game. As stated by Klei entertainment, Sugar Rush "will see the light of day", although not being published by Nexon America. By late August 2010, development of Sugar Rush had stopped and the game was cancelled.
