= Invisible, Inc. =

2015 video game

- Developer: Klei Entertainment
- Publisher: Klei Entertainment
- Composers: Vince de Vera; Jason Garner
- Engine: Moai
- Platforms: Microsoft Windows, OS X, Linux, PlayStation 4, iOS, Nintendo Switch
- Release: Windows, OS X, Linux; May 12, 2015; PlayStation 4; April 19, 2016; iOS; October 6, 2016; Nintendo Switch; June 15, 2020
- Genres: Turn-based tactics, stealth
- Mode: Single-player

Invisible, Inc. (stylized as INVI?IBLE, INC.) is a 2015 turn-based tactics stealth developed and published by Klei Entertainment. The player acts as the remote operator for an espionage agency that has come under attack from multinational corporations, and directs agents in covert missions, acquiring resources and support in order to enable relocation of the agency's computer system to a safe haven within a limited amount of time.

The game was available for early access for Microsoft Windows and OS X from January 2014, a Linux build was later released. The full version was released for Windows, OS X, and Linux on May 12, 2015. A PlayStation 4 and iOS versions were released in April and October 2016, respectively. A Nintendo Switch version was released on June 15, 2020.

== Gameplay ==
Tactical view in Invisible, Inc. In this image, the player is controlling two agents (one pictured in the far-left), who have recently knocked out an enemy guard (as seen with the red indicator).

The game is a turn-based tactics based-game inspired by X-COM, with emphasis on stealth and espionage. In each playthrough, the player takes on the role of an agent handler for covert operations and has three days to prepare for their final mission. This is done by performing various missions across the globe to retrieve information, valuables, equipment and personnel, keeping cognizant of the amount of time taken for travel and missions within that three day period. The player selects two agents to perform these missions to start, and may be able to free other agents during missions; should one agent die during a mission, they remain dead for the remainder of the runthrough unless revived using a medkit consumable or dragged to the exit by another agent, while if all agents die, the game is over. The mission details and location layouts are procedurally generated for each run through, featuring a variety of objectives, obstacles, and difficulty.

Missions are played out in a turn-based manner. Each agent under the player's control has a limited number of action points each turn that allow them to move, open/close doors, take out guards silently, or perform other covert tasks. Additionally, the player may need to collect power to be able to use "Incognita", the hacking interface that allows them to disable alarms and security cameras or remove locks on safes. Once the player has completed their turn, any enemy forces move, and in most locations an alarm level is raised; with higher alarm levels, new security forces and threats will arrive, making the mission more difficult. Certain stations can let the player purchase upgrades or equipment for the agents to help in the mission, using collected in-game money. The objective of the mission depends on the facility type being infiltrated, usually requiring the player to retrieve a specific item from a secure location and escape, stealing as much money and equipment as possible along the way.

The game has a larger meta-game aspect, in that as they play and complete certain goals, they can unlock different agents with different skill sets or new default equipment to begin missions with in future playthroughs.

== Plot ==
The game is set in year 2074, after megacorporations have overthrown the world's national governments and taken control. Invisible Inc. is a private intelligence agency providing services to corporations, performing infiltrations using field agents and a sophisticated AI system known as Incognita.

At the start of the game, Invisible Inc. is compromised by corporate soldiers. The compromise leads to the loss of the headquarters and most assets and agents; only the agency's leader, two agents, Monst3r, Incognita, and the player-character escape. Only extremely powerful computer systems can host Incognita, and Incognita cannot survive outside of such systems for more than 72 hours. The agency’s task, thus, is to use that time to prepare for a final mission, in which they will try to infiltrate the enemy's headquarters to access a computer system and insert Incognita. Once uploaded, Incognita reveals she has been planning to exterminate the megacorporations. The storyline ends with Incognita's using satellites equipped with orbital lasers to destroy the megacorporations' headquarters, killing thousands. Incognita defies to be removed from the new host computer and allows the agency's leader to leave unharmed.

== Development ==
Invisible, Inc. was announced in July 2013, in an interview with Rock, Paper, Shotgun's Nathan Grayson. A preview of the alpha version of the game was shown at the September PAX Prime 2013 expo. After playing the preview, Grayson commented that the game was very early in development, but that he "really enjoyed" his session with the game.

The game was originally titled Incognita but was renamed to Invisible, Inc. after developer Klei Entertainment found the new title was better received during focus testing. The name remains as part of the game as "Incognita" mode used to interact with the various electronic systems.

An alpha version of the game entered Early Access in January 2014. The game was added to the Steam Early Access program on August 20 the same year, and fully released on May 12, 2015. The game was released on the PlayStation 4, including the Contingency Plan content, on April 19, 2016. An iOS version of the base game was released on October 6 the same year. The Switch version was released on June 15, 2020.

Downloadable content (DLC) for the game, titled Invisible, Inc. Contingency Plan was released in November 2015. The DLC adds agents, mission difficulty levels, missions, enemy types, weapons and items to the main game, in addition to an extended campaign.

== Reception ==
Reception

Aggregate score
Aggregator	Score
Metacritic	PC/PS4: 82/100

Review scores
Publication	Score
Game Informer	8/10
GameSpot	7/10
IGN	8.5/10
PC Gamer (US)	80/100

Invisible, Inc. was named as a finalist for the Excellence in Design and the Seumas McNally Grand Prize for the 2015 Independent Games Festival.

Invisible, Inc. received positive reviews upon release. Aggregating review website Metacritic gave the PC version of the game 82/100 based on 45 reviews.
