= Illuminate =

Illuminate may refer to:

== Music ==
=== Bands ===
- Illuminate (2009), a 2009 E.P. by English Progressive Metal band Suns of the Tundra
- Illuminate (band), a German gothic music band

=== Albums and EPs ===
- Illuminate (Joe Morris and Rob Brown album), 1995
- Illuminate (David Crowder Band album), 2003
- Illuminate, an EP by Qntal, 2004
- Illuminate (Karmacoda album), 2007 album by Karmacoda
- Illuminate (Lydia album), 2008
- Illuminate (Destine album), 2012
- Illuminate... (The Hits and More), 2013 album by 911
- Illuminate (Shawn Mendes album), 2016

=== Songs and music videos ===
- "Illuminate", from Imperial Drag by Imperial Drag, 1996
- "Illuminate", from The Altogether by Orbital featuring David Gray, 2001
- "Illuminate", from Work 1989–2002 by Orbital, 2002
- "Illuminate", from Cool Morning by Sloan Wainwright, 2003
- "Illuminate", from The Audio Injected Soul by Mnemic, 2004
- "Illuminate", from Rival Factions by Project 86, 2007
- "Illuminate", from These Are My Sins by I, The Breather, 2010
- "Illuminate", from Control System by Ab-Soul and featuring Kendrick Lamar, 2012
- "Illuminate", from Record Time by Wanderlust, 2012
- "Illuminate", from Pepper by Pepper, 2013
- "Illuminate", single by Jan Johnston with DJ Feel, 2013
- "Illuminate", from Ashes to Ashes by Chelsea Grin, 2014
- "Illuminate", from Bloodwork by Texas in July, 2014
- "Illuminate", from Faceless by Buried in Verona, 2014
- "Illuminate", from Forget the World by Afrojack with Matthew Koma, 2014
- "Illuminate", from Lift a Sail by Yellowcard, 2014
- "Illuminate", single by Tourist featuring Years & Years, 2014
- "Illuminate", from A Line That Connects by Lycia, 2015
- "Illuminate", from Stories from the Surface by Ham Sandwich, 2015
- "Illuminate", from Soul Sphere by Born of Osiris, 2015
- "Illuminate", from Anubis by Mercedes Lander, 2016
- "Illuminate", from Free Will by Freeway, 2016
- "Illuminate", pre-download by Lecrae featuring Dria, 2016
- "Illuminate", from Supercry by Emma Louise, 2016
- "Illuminate", music video by Courtney Act with Our Lady J, 2017
- "Illuminate", from Malina by Leprous, 2017
- "Illuminate", from Modern Addiction by Tender, 2017
- "Illuminate", from Monstercat Uncaged Vol. 1, by Duumu featuring Slyleaf, 2017
- "Illuminate", from My First Word Was Juice by Plato III featuring Remi Lekun, 2017
- "Illuminate", from the anime Tales of Zestiria the X by Minami Kuribayashi, 2017
- "Illuminate", from Grim by Dark Sarah and music video, 2020
- "Illuminate", from Portals by Sub Focus and Wilkinson, 2020
- "Illuminate", from XOXO by The Jayhawks, 2020
- "Illuminate", from Winterlicious by Debbie Gibson, 2022
- "Illuminate", single by Iceleak with Rory Hope & New Arena, 2022
- "Illuminate", from Shoreline by Etherwood featuring Riya, 2024
- "Illuminate", single by Grace Davies, 2024
- "Illuminate" (song), by Jessie Reyez and Elyanna from the FIFA World Cup 2026 Official Album

=== Other uses ===
- "Illuminate", a theme of the TEDxMcGill 2021 conference
- "Illuminate", a power in the adventure and puzzle game Dream Chronicles: The Book of Air, 2010

== See also ==
- Illuminate Light & Laser Spectacular, a show at the Dreamworld theme park on the Gold Coast, Australia
- Illuminated (disambiguation)
- Illuminates of Thanateros, a magic society, founded in 1987
- Illuminati (disambiguation)
- Illumination (disambiguation)
- Illuminations (disambiguation)
- Illuminator (disambiguation)
- Team Illuminate (disambiguation)
