= Illuminato =

Illuminato may refer to:

- Illuminato Aiguino, 16th century polyphonic musical theory formulator – see Aeolian mode
- Illuminato da Rieti (fl. 1219), companion of Saint Francis
- Illuminato da Chieti (f. c. 1281), Franciscan friar and bishop of Assisi
- Filippo Illuminato (1930–1943), Italian partisan during World War II

== See also ==
- Illuminatus (disambiguation)
