= Illuminati (disambiguation) =

Illuminati, in both Latin and Italian, means "illuminated/enlightened (ones)" and primarily refers to a Bavarian Enlightenment-era secret society.

Illuminati and variants of the term may also refer to:

== Movements ==
- Alumbrados or Illuminati, practitioners of a mystical form of Christianity in 16th-century Spain
- Illuminism, 18th–19th-century European esoteric movement

== Books ==
- Illuminati, the title of the German and Greek editions of Dan Brown's novel Angels & Demons
- The Illuminati, a novel by Larry Burkett
- Illuminati (comics), a group of superheroes created by Marvel Comics

== Games ==
- Illuminati, a fictional secret society and a player faction in the game The Secret World
- Illuminati (Deus Ex), a fictional secret society in the game Deus Ex
- Illuminati (game), a card game by Steve Jackson Games
  - Illuminati: New World Order, another card game by Steve Jackson Games
- Illuminati (play-by-mail game)

== Albums ==
- Illuminati (The Pastels album)
- Illuminati (Ten album)
- Illuminati (EP), a 2002 EP by Fatboy Slim
- Iluminatti, a 2019 album by Natti Natasha

== Songs ==
- "Illuminati" (Madonna song), from Madonna's thirteenth studio album Rebel Heart
- "Illuminati" (Dabzee song), from the 2024 Indian Malayalam film Aavesham
- "Illuminati", a song by Korn from The Path of Totality
- "Illuminati" (Malice Mizer song), 1998 song by Malice Mizer
- "Illuminati", 2020 song by Lil' Pump and Anuel AA
- "Illuminati", a song by Ghanaian rapper Sarkodie from the album Sarkology

== Other uses ==
- Illuminati II, a cotton brand producing cotton fabrics from Ugandan organic and fair trade cotton

== See also ==
- List of Illuminati members
- Cabal (disambiguation)
- Illuminata (disambiguation)
- Illuminate (disambiguation)
- Illuminatus (disambiguation)
- Illumination (disambiguation)
