= Illuminated =

Illuminated may refer to:

- "Illuminated" (song), by Hurts
- Illuminated Film Company, a British animation house
- Illuminated, alternative title of Black Sheep (Nat & Alex Wolff album)
- Illuminated manuscript

== See also ==
- Illuminate (disambiguation)
- Illumination (disambiguation)
- Illuminations (disambiguation)
- Illuminator (disambiguation)
