= Brenda Milner =

British-Canadian neuroscientist and neuropsychologist (born 1918)

Brenda Milner CC GOQ FRS FRSC
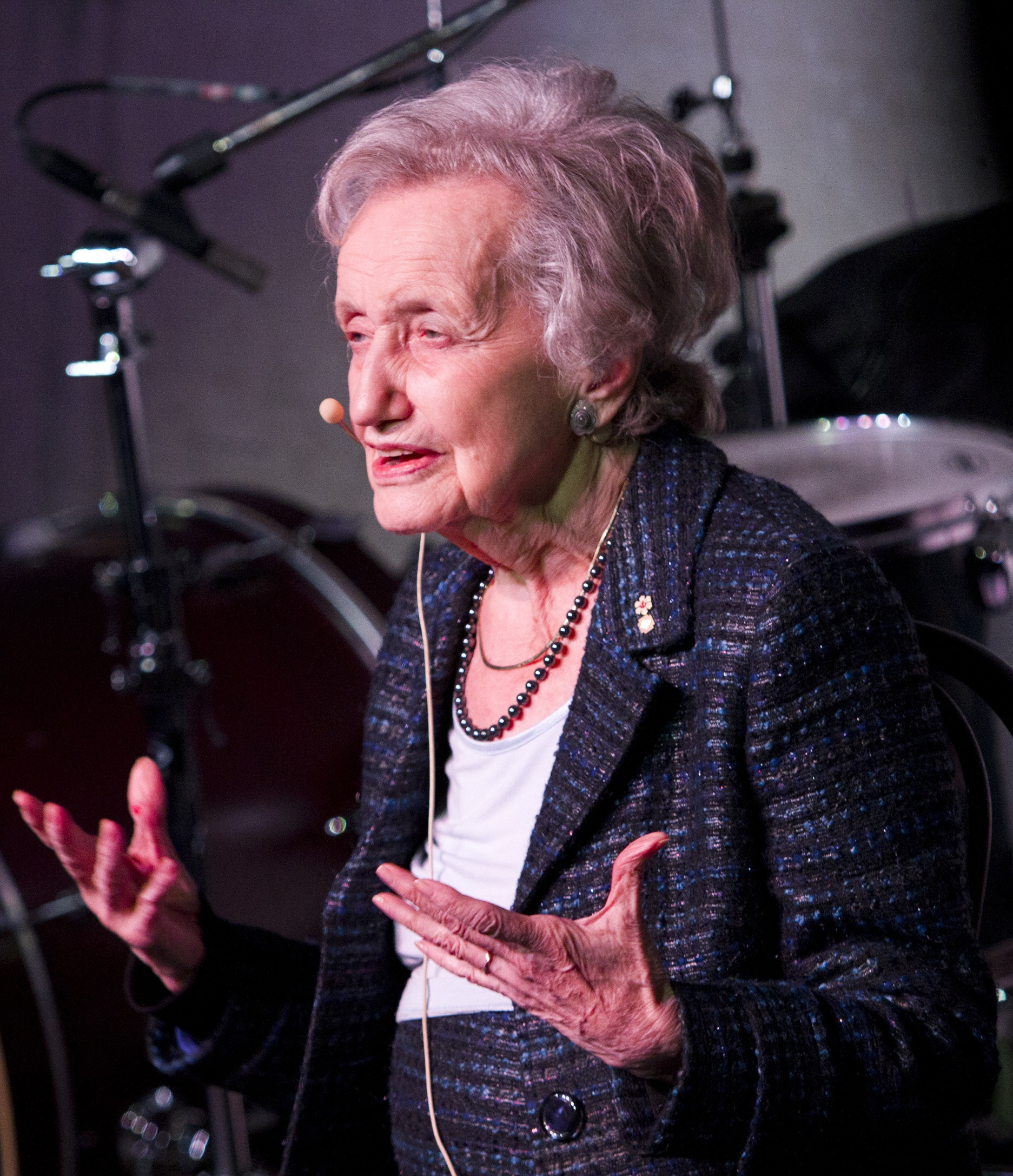
- Milner at TEDxMcGill in 2011
- Born: Brenda Langford; 15 July 1918 (age 108); Manchester, England
- Education: Newnham College, Cambridge; McGill University
- Known for: Study of memory and cognition; Work with patient H.M.
- Spouse: Peter Milner (m. 1944; died 2018)
- Awards: Companion of the Order of Canada; Karl Spencer Lashley Award (1979); NAS Award in the Neurosciences (2004); Gairdner Award (2005); Balzan Prize for Cognitive Neurosciences (2009); Kavli Prize in Neuroscience (2014)
- Scientific career
- Fields: Neuropsychology
- Workplaces: McGill University, Montreal Neurological Institute
- Thesis: Intellectual effects of temporal-lobe damage in man (1952)
- Doctoral advisor: Donald Olding Hebb
- Doctoral students: Suzanne Corkin; Ingrid Johnsrude; Doreen Kimura

Brenda Milner (née Langford; born 15 July 1918) is a British-Canadian neuropsychologist who has contributed extensively to the research literature on various topics in the field of clinical neuropsychology. Milner is a professor in the Department of Neurology and Neurosurgery at McGill University and a professor of Psychology at the Montreal Neurological Institute. As of 2020, she holds more than 25 honorary degrees and she continued to work in her nineties. Her work covers many aspects of neuropsychology including her lifelong interest in the involvement of the temporal lobes in episodic memory. She is sometimes referred to as one of the founders of neuropsychology and has been essential in its development. She received the Balzan Prize for Cognitive Neuroscience in 2009, and the Kavli Prize in Neuroscience, together with John O'Keefe, and Marcus E. Raichle, in 2014. She turned 100 in July 2018.

== Early life and education ==
Brenda Langford was born on 15 July 1918, in Manchester, England. Her father Samuel Langford was a musical critic, journalist, and teacher, and her mother (née Leslie Doig, 1885–1980) was one of his students. Though she was a daughter to two musically talented parents, she had no interest in music. She was tutored by her father in mathematics and the arts until the age of 8. She attended Withington Girls' School, which led her to attend Newnham College, Cambridge, to study mathematics, having received a scholarship in 1936. However, after realising she was not "perceptive" enough for mathematics, Milner changed her field of study to psychology. In 1939, Milner graduated with a BA degree in experimental psychology, which at that time was considered a moral science.

One of her supervisors in the Department of Experimental Psychology, Cambridge, was Oliver Zangwill, to whom she owed her first interest in human brain function, and the value of studying brain lesions.

After her graduation near the time of World War II, Newnham College awarded her a Sarah Smithson Research Studentship, which allowed her to attend Newnham for the following two years. As a result of World War II, the work of the Cambridge Psychological Laboratory, under Bartlett's leadership, was diverted almost overnight to applied research in the selection of aircrew. Milner's position was to devise perceptual tasks for future use in selecting aircrew. More specifically, she was on a team interested in distinguishing fighter pilots from bomber pilots using aptitude tests. "Later in the war, from 1941 to 1944, she worked in Malvern as an Experimental Officer for the Ministry of Supply, investigating different methods of display and control to be used by radar operators."

In 1941, Brenda met her husband, Peter Milner. Both Brenda and her husband were working on radar research. He was an electrical engineer who had also been recruited for the war effort. In 1944, they married and left for Canada where Peter had been invited to work with physicists on atomic research. They travelled to Boston on the ship the Queen Elizabeth together with "war brides" who were travelling to the United States to live with their husbands' families during the war. Upon arrival in Canada, she began teaching psychology at the University of Montreal, where she stayed for 7 years.

In 1949, Brenda Milner graduated with a MA degree in experimental psychology in Cambridge. In Montreal, she became a PhD degree candidate in physiological psychology at McGill University, under the direction of Donald Olding Hebb. While working on her doctorate, Milner and Hebb presented research on their patient P.B. who had undergone a medial temporal lobectomy and had subsequent memory impairment. This garnered the attention of Wilder Penfield. In 1950, Hebb gave Milner an opportunity to study with him at the Montreal Neurological Institute. Under the supervision of Penfield, she studied the behaviour of young adult epileptic patients treated with elective focal ablation of brain tissue to treat uncontrolled seizures. In 1952, Milner earned her PhD degree in experimental psychology with a thesis on the cognitive effects of temporal lobe damage in man. Milner has been awarded a number of honorary degrees including an ScD degree from the University of Cambridge in 2000.

== Professional career ==
In 1954, Milner published an article in the McGill University Psychological Bulletin entitled 'Intellectual Function of the Temporal Lobes'. In this publication, she presented data that showed that temporal lobe damage can cause emotional and intellectual changes in humans and lower primates. Her review of neuroscience studies conducted in animals discouraged many neurosurgeons from completing surgeries on humans that could negatively impact their lives. "Milner's early work on the temporal lobes was influenced by the results of ablation work with lower primates, and particularly by Mishkin and Pribram's discovery of the role of the inferotemporal neocortex in visual discrimination learning."

Milner was a pioneer in the field of neuropsychology and in the study of memory and other cognitive functions in humankind. She was invited to Hartford to study Henry Molaison, formerly known as patient H.M., who became the most famous patient in cognitive neuroscience. He "had undergone a bilateral temporal lobectomy that included removal of major portions of the hippocampus." She studied the effects of this damage to the medial temporal lobe on memory and systematically described the cognitive deficits exhibited by H.M.

In the early stages of her work with H.M., Milner wanted to completely understand his memory impairments. Milner showed that the medial temporal lobe amnestic syndrome is characterised by an inability to acquire new memories and an inability to recall established memories from a few years immediately before damage, while memories from the more remote past and other cognitive abilities, including language, perception and reasoning were intact. For example, Milner spent three days with H.M. as he learned a new perceptual-motor task in order to determine what type of learning and memory were intact in him. This task involved reproducing the drawing of a star by looking at it in a mirror. His performance improved over those three days. However, he subsequently retained absolutely no memory of any events that took place during those three days. This led Milner to speculate that there are different types of learning and memory, each dependent on a separate system of the brain . She was able to demonstrate two different memory systems – episodic memory and procedural memory.

Milner discovered from H.M. and other case studies that "bilateral medial temporal-lobe resection in man results in a persistent impairment of recent memory whenever the removal is carried far enough posteriorly to damage portions of the anterior hippocampus and hippocampal gyrus." She showed that in patients with this syndrome the ability to learn certain motor skills remained normal. This finding introduced the concept of multiple memory systems within the brain and stimulated an enormous body of research. Milner stated in an interview with the McGill Journal of Medicine, "To see that H.M. had learned the task perfectly but with absolutely no awareness that he had done it before was an amazing dissociation. If you want to know what was an exciting moment of my life, that was one."

She has made major contributions to the understanding of the role of the frontal lobes in memory processing, in the area of organizing information. "Dr. Milner's seminal research has provided many landmark discoveries in the study of human memory and the brain's temporal lobes, which play a key role in emotional responses, hearing, memory and speech."

She demonstrated the critical role of the dorsolateral frontal cortex for the temporal organization of memory and her work showed that there is partial separability of the neural circuits subserving recognition memory from those mediating memory for temporal order. She described the inflexibility in problem solving that is now widely recognized as a common consequence of frontal-lobe injury. These refinements in the understanding of memory and exposition of the relevant brain regions revealed the anatomically diffuse nature of complex cognitive functions in the brain.

Milner helped describe the lateralization of function in the human brain and has shown how the neural substrate of language in the cerebral hemispheres can vary in left-handed, right-handed and ambidextrous individuals (see handedness). She used the Wada test to show that for any handedness, the left hemisphere is dominant for language in most people. These studies of the relationship between hand preference and speech lateralization led to an understanding of the effects of early unilateral brain lesions on the pattern of cerebral organization at maturity. Her studies were among the first to demonstrate convincingly that damage to the brain can lead to dramatic functional reorganization.

Using mostly prize money from her numerous awards, Milner donated 1 million dollars to the Montreal Neurological Institute in 2007, after establishing a foundation in her name.

== Recent research ==
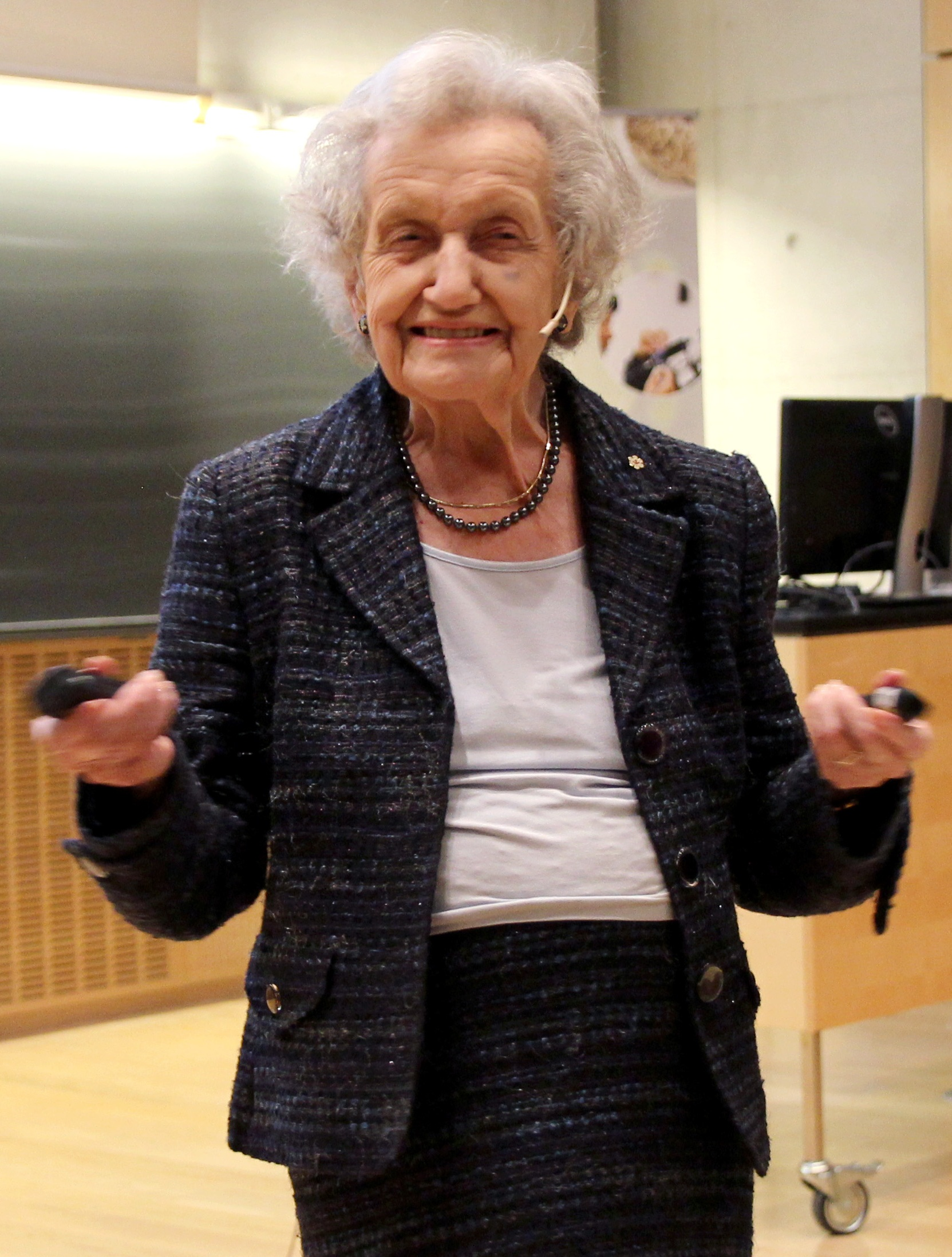
Brenda Milner in 2014

In more recent times, Milner has expanded her research to the study of brain activity in normal subjects using functional magnetic resonance imaging (fMRI) and positron emission tomography (PET). These studies focus on the identification of brain regions associated with spatial memory and language, including the neural substrates of monolingual and bilingual speech processing. In another series of PET studies, she has sought to delineate further the role of the right hippocampal region in memory for the spatial location of objects.

Milner kept some involvement in teaching and researching past her 100th birthday. She is the Dorothy J. Killam Professor at the Montreal Neurological Institute, and a professor in the Department of Neurology and Neurosurgery at McGill University. One of Milner's current collaborators is Denise Klein, an assistant professor in the Neurology/Cognitive Neuroscience unit at McGill. Their research on bilingualism entails investigating the difference in neural pathways used to acquire new and native languages.

In 2018, Milner celebrated her 100th birthday in Montreal with about 30 friends, including fellow researcher Denise Klein. Although she never expected to reach this age, Milner stated that she has "every intention of continuing for many more birthdays." The Montreal Neurological Institute held a symposium in September 2018, celebrating her accomplishments. That same year, Milner participated in a video series, launched by the Montreal Neurological Institute, dedicated to promoting female scientists and researchers. During the interview, Milner spoke about her early life and gave an overview of her career.

She has continued research into memory and language throughout her career.

Her recent work includes the utilisation of modern neuroimaging techniques — such as positron emission tomography (PET) and functional magnetic resonance imaging (fMRI) — to further investigate brain regions involved in bilingualism, language processing, and memory.

== Awards and honours ==
Milner has received numerous awards for her contributions to neuroscience and psychology, including Fellowships in the Royal Society of London, the Royal Society of Canada and membership of the National Academy of Sciences. As of 2025, she has been awarded honorary degrees from more than 25 different universities across Canada, Europe, and the United States.

Early on, Milner was awarded a Sarah Smithson Research Studentship by Newnham College, Cambridge after her graduation, which allowed her to continue her work at Newnham College. In 1984, Milner was made an Officer of the Order of Canada and was promoted to Companion in 2004. In 1987, she was awarded the Ralph W. Gerard Prize in Neuroscience. She was also awarded the National Academy of Sciences Award in the Neurosciences in 2004 for her seminal investigations of the role of the temporal lobes and other brain regions in learning, memory, and language. In 1985, she was made an Officer of the National Order of Quebec and was promoted to Grand Officer in 2009. She was elected a Foreign Honorary Member of the American Academy of Arts and Sciences in 2007. She was awarded the Balzan Prize for her contributions to Cognitive Neurosciences in a ceremony held in the Swiss Parliament in December 2009.

Milner was awarded the Kavli Prize in Neuroscience in 2014. Other awards and recognition include: Election to the National Academy of Sciences (1976), the Metlife Foundation Award for Medical Research in Alzheimer's Disease (1996), election to the American Academy of Arts and Sciences (2005), the Canada Gairdner International Award (2005), the Dan David Prize (2014), the Prix Hommage du 50e anniversaire from the Ordre des psychologues du Québec (2014), induction into the Canadian Science and Engineering Hall of Fame (2012), recipient of a medal of honour from the National Assembly of Quebec (2018), Pearl Meister Greengard Prize (2011), the Norman A. Anderson Lifetime Achievement Award (2010), the Goldman-Rakic Prize for Outstanding Achievement in Cognitive Neuroscience by NARSAD (2009), the NSERC Medal of Excellence (2009 and 2010), the Gairdner Foundation International Award (2005), the Prix Wilder-Penfield (Prix du Québec) (1993), and election as a Fellow of the Royal Society of London, and Fellow of the Royal Society of Canada.

In 2019, the Quebec government named a special needs school after Milner. École régionale Brenda-Milner serves students in preschool, elementary, and secondary levels in the Montérégie area.
