= Illuminata =

Illuminata may refer to:

- Illuminata (film), a 1998 American film
- Illuminata (band), an Austrian symphonic metal band formed in 2006
- Saint Illuminata (died c. 320), an Italian Christian saint

== See also ==
- Illuminati (disambiguation)
- (including several species of moths)
