= Oscalypso =

Studio album by Erik Friedlander
- Released: October 16, 2015
- Recorded: 2015
- Studio: East Side Sound, NYC
- Genre: Jazz
- Length: 44:16
- Label: Skipstone; SSR22
- Producer: Erik Friedlander

Erik Friedlander chronology
| Illuminations (2015) | Oscalypso (2015) | Rings (2016) |

Oscalypso (subtitled Tribute to Oscar Pettiford) is an album by cellist Erik Friedlander performing compositions by Oscar Pettiford which was released in 2015 on the Skipstone label.

== Reception ==
Professional ratings
Review scores
| Source | Rating |
|---|---|
| All About Jazz | 4/5 stars |

In JazzTimes Britt Robson called it "a modern, adventurous bebop record fronted by a cellist who takes no prisoners". Stereophile's Fred Kaplan said the album was a "supremely satisfying album, heaving the precision swing for which Pettiford was renown, spiked with a light twist of dissonance that leans his music forward while fully honoring its modernist flavors". Writing for All About Jazz, Troy Collins noted "Brimming with gorgeous melodies, lush harmonies and captivating rhythms, Friedlander's beguiling arrangements provide a rich foundation for the group to test its improvisational mettle. Focusing on reconfigured classics rather than new compositions, Oscalypso is more than just a delightful homage to a renowned master—it is a signifier of Friedlander's skills as an imaginative interpreter of traditional jazz repertoire".

== Track listing ==
All compositions by Oscar Pettiford.

1. "Bohemia After Dark" - 5:57
2. "Oscalypso" - 6:04
3. "Cello Again" - 4:06
4. "Two Little Pearls" - 5:35
5. "Pendulum at Falcon's Lair" - 4:46
6. "Tricotism" - 4:21
7. "Tamalpais Love Song" - 5:33
8. "Cable Car" - 3:31
9. "Sunrise Sunset" - 4:23

== Personnel ==
- Erik Friedlander – cello
- Michael Blake – saxophones
- Trevor Dunn – bass
- Mike Sarin – drums
