= Everything Black =

Single by Unlike Pluto featuring Mike Taylor

from the album Monstercat Uncaged Vol. 1
- Released: 10 March 2017
- Recorded: 2016
- Genre: R&B; jazz; EDM
- Length: 3:49
- Label: Monstercat
- Songwriters: Armond Arabshahi, Mike Taylor
- Producer: Armond Arabshahi

Unlike Pluto featuring Mike Taylor singles chronology
"Worst in Me" (2017)	"Everything Black" (2017)	"Sweet" (2017)

"Everything Black" is a song by Persian American electronic/alternative rock music producer Armond Arabshahi, better known by his stage name Unlike Pluto, and features American vocalist Mike Taylor. The single was released on the Canadian label Monstercat on March 10, 2017 and is Arabshashi's fifth release on the label.

== Background ==
Uproxx described the song as "jazzy and dark," with "a slinky, almost joyful groove." The song incorporates elements of R&B, jazz, funk, and soul.

== Reception ==
Billboard described Mike Taylor's vocal performance as a comparison to Mick Jagger of the Rolling Stones. Noiseporn described the song as "everything a modern, all-black wearing, club crawling millennial like myself could ask for." EDM.com proclaimed Taylor's vocals as "superb".

== Tour ==
On release, Arabshahi announced the Everything Black Tour, which covered much of North America. The tour began on March 31 in Ottawa.

== Certifications ==
Region	Certification	Certified units/sales
Canada (Music Canada)	Gold	40,000^{‡}
United States (RIAA)	Gold	500,000^{‡}
^{‡} Sales+streaming figures based on certification alone.
