= Illuminations =

Illuminations may refer to:

== Shows and festivals ==
- IllumiNations: Reflections of Earth, a nightly fireworks show formerly at Epcot at Walt Disney World Resort
- IllumiNations, original nightly firework show at Epcot at Walt Disney World Resort before Reflections of Earth was created
- Illuminations (festival), a secular autumn festival of electric lights held in several English cities
  - Blackpool Illuminations, an annual lights festival in the British seaside resort of Blackpool
- Disney Illuminations, a nightly firework show at Disneyland Paris

== Music and video ==
- Illuminations (Alice Coltrane and Carlos Santana album) or the title song, 1974
- Illuminations (Buffy Sainte-Marie album), 1969
- Illuminations (Erik Friedlander album), 2015
- Illuminations (Josh Groban album), 2010
- Illuminations (McCoy Tyner album) or the title song, 2004
- Illuminations (Wishbone Ash album), 1996
- Illuminations (EP), by Little Boots, 2009
- Illuminations (video), by the Tea Party, 2001
- Les Illuminations (Britten), a 1940 song cycle by Benjamin Britten setting texts by Rimbaud
- Illuminations, a 1950 ballet by Sir Frederick Ashton to Britten's Les Illuminations

== Other uses ==
- Illuminations (film), a 1976 Australian film
- Illuminations (poetry collection), an 1886 book by Arthur Rimbaud
- Illuminations (novel), a 2012 fictionalized biography of Hildegard of Bingen by Mary Sharrat
- Illuminations: Stories, 2022 short story collection by Alan Moore

== See also ==
- Illumination (disambiguation)
