= Monstercat Uncaged Vol. 1 =

Compilation album by Monstercat
- Released: 12 May 2017
- Genre: EDM; Electronic
- Length: 1:55:00
- Label: Monstercat
- Producer: Various Artists

Monstercat chronology
Monstercat 030 – Finale (2017)	Monstercat Uncaged Vol. 1 (2017)	Monstercat Uncaged Vol. 2 (2017)

Monstercat Uncaged Vol. 1 is the thirty-first compilation album by the independent record label Monstercat and was released on 12 May 2017. Uncaged Vol. 1 contains thirty-one songs from various artists as well as an album mix.

== Background ==
Monstercat Uncaged Vol. 1 is the first of the Uncaged Monstercat compilation series, replacing the previous compilation series which was first introduced with 001 - Launch Week, released on 7 July 2011. The compilation series ended with 030 - Finale which released on 22 February 2017. Unity, a song by Rogue, Stonebank and Slips & Slurs was released as an album-exclusive to Uncaged, Vol. 1 a few days prior to the album being released.

Monstercat Uncaged Vol. 1 features 31 songs from various artists including Watch Out by Dirtyphonics & Bassnectar (featuring vocals by Ragga Twins), Borneo by Aero Chord & Wolfgang Gartner, Move That Body by Pegboard Nerds & Quiet Disorder and This Time by Kayzo. Uncaged Vol. 1 features several recurring artists from previous Monstercat compilation albums such as Mr FijiWiji, Pegboard Nerds, Darren Styles and Aero Chord as well as several newcomer artists such as Kayzo, Dirtyphonics, Bassnectar and Wolfgang Gartner.

== Track listing ==
No.	Title	Music	Genre	Length
1.	"Unity"	Rogue x Stonebank x Slippy (Note: At the time of this single's release, Slippy was credited as Slips & Slurs until he changed his alias in 2018.)	Trap	3:23
2.	"Watch Out" (featuring Ragga Twins)	Dirtyphonics & Bassnectar	Drumstep	3:23
3.	"Borneo"	Wolfgang Gartner x Aero Chord	Electronic	3:55
4.	"Everything Black" (featuring Mike Taylor)	Unlike Pluto	Electronic	3:49
5.	"Move That Body"	Pegboard Nerds x Quiet Disorder	Electro	3:37
6.	"This Time"	Kayzo	Hard Dance	2:50
7.	"Us Against the World"	Darren Styles	Happy Hardcore	4:31
8.	"Starship"	Grant	Future Bass	3:33
9.	"BLAST"	Tokyo Machine	Breaks	4:21
10.	"Afterdark" (featuring Aviella)	Myrne	Future Bass	3:20
11.	"Waiting on Your Call" (featuring Park Avenue)	Anevo	Electronic	4:31
12.	"Chardonnay" (featuring Karra)	Conro	Future Bass	3:29
13.	"Bandit"	Kuuro	Trap	2:45
14.	"Spectrum"	Muzz	Drum & Bass	6:56
15.	"Turmoil"	Slippy x Holly	Trap	3:13
16.	"Want You"	Orbiter	Electronic	3:23
17.	"Bass Drop"	Zero Hero (Darren Styles & Stonebank)	Hard Dance	3:06
18.	"Bollywood Stunna"	Reach	Moombahton	2:55
19.	"Escape"	Noisestorm	Breaks	3:09
20.	"Home"	Nitro Fun	Electronic	3:26
21.	"Swapping Things"	Topi	House	3:12
22.	"Ripped to Pieces" (featuring EMEL)	Stonebank	Happy Hardcore	4:27
23.	"Levitate" (featuring Tylor Maurer)	Rootkit	House	3:43
24.	"Boom"	Ricci	House	4:24
25.	"Neos"	Glacier	Future Bass	4:01
26.	"Bubble Beam"	Nanobii	Happy Hardcore	2:58
27.	"CRAZY"	Tokyo Machine	Electro	3:17
28.	"Tomorrow" (featuring Matt Van & Holly Drummond)	Mr FijiWiji & Direct	Chillout	4:10
29.	"Sweet" (featuring Mister Blonde)	Unlike Pluto	Electronic	3:11
30.	"Illuminate" (featuring Slyleaf)	Duumu	Electronic	4:02
31.	"Andromeda" (featuring Matt Van)	Mr FijiWiji & Exist Strategy	Chillout	3:44
Total length:				1:54:49

=== Album mix ===
No.	Title	Music	Length
32.	"Uncaged Vol. 1 Mix"	Monstercat	1:42:11

== Charts ==
Chart (2017)	Peak position
Top Dance/Electronic Albums (Billboard)	24
