= Ingrid Johnsrude =

Canadian neuroscientist

- Born: 1967 (age 58–59); Halifax, Nova Scotia

Academic background
- Education: BA, Queen's University at Kingston; MSc, PhD, 1997, McGill University
- Thesis: The neural substrates of the processing of speech sounds (1997)
- Doctoral advisors: Brenda Milner

Academic work
- Institutions: University of Western Ontario; Queen's University

Ingrid Suzanne Johnsrude FCAHS (born 1967) is a Canadian neuroscientist. She is a professor of psychology at University of Western Ontario, and former Canada Research Chair in Cognitive Neuroscience. Her research involves brain imaging, the connections between brain structure and language ability, and the diagnosis of degenerative brain diseases in the elderly.

== Early life and education ==
Johnsrude was born in 1967 in Halifax, Nova Scotia to a military family. Due to this, she moved around as a child before settling in Kingston, Ontario for her final year of high school. She graduated from Loyalist Collegiate and Vocational Institute in 1985 with an honours diploma. Johnsrude then completed her Bachelor of Science degree at Queen's University at Kingston before enrolling at McGill University for her Master of Science degree and PhD. She earned her PhD under the supervision of Brenda Milner.

== Career ==
After spending seven years in England, Johnsrude was recruited by Queen's University's Department of Psychology in 2002 to return as a professor. While in the UK, Johnsrude and her co-authors received an Ig Nobel Prize in Medicine for their work showing that London taxicab drivers had more highly developed hippocampi than those in other professions. She eventually joined Queen's Department of Psychology in 2003 after being named a Canada Research Chair in Cognitive Neuroscience. Johnsrude used this funding to study how human minds interpreted all the noises coming out of other people's mouths into meaningful sentences. After winning a 2006 Early Researcher Award from the Ontario provincial government, Johnsrude's research team began using magnetic resonance imaging (MRI) to study how speech is processed under difficult conditions. In 2009, Johnsrude received a Natural Sciences and Engineering Research Council of Canada E.W.R. Steacie Fellowship and was renewed as a Canada Research Chair.

Johnsrude left Queen's University in 2014 to join the University of Western Ontario's (UWO) Faculty of Social Science and Faculty of Health Sciences as an inaugural Western Research Chair. She was appointed director of Western's Brain and Mind Institute in 2019. Johnsrude was elected a Fellow of the Canadian Academy of Health Sciences in 2021 for her "major contributions to how the brain is organized for perception of speech and language."

== See also ==
- List of Ig Nobel Prize winners
