= Rings (album) =

Studio album by Erik Friedlander
- Released: June 10, 2016
- Recorded: 2016
- Studio: Story Sound, NYC
- Genre: Avant-garde, jazz, contemporary classical music
- Length: 66:24
- Label: Skipstone; SKPSTO23
- Producer: Erik Friedlander

Erik Friedlander chronology
Oscalypso (2015)	Rings (2016)	Artemisia (2018)

Rings is an album by cellist Erik Friedlander which was released in 2016 on the Skipstone label.

== Reception ==
Professional ratings
Review scores
Source	Rating
AllMusic	4.5/5 stars

Writing for All About Jazz, Jakob Baekgaard said "Rings is an album that successfully crosses the boundaries of classical music, jazz and world music using the vehicle of repetition. Friedlander's ability to combine melodic accessibility, improvisation and avant-garde leanings into poetic and cinematic music brings to mind the eminent pianist and composer Ryuichi Sakamoto. Rings serves as an ideal introduction to new listeners and will hopefully make even more people discover Friedlander's wonderful music". The Jazz Trail review by Filipe Freitus stated the album "marks a welcoming return to a much more appealing creative freedom, mixing the incantations of the world music, the gallant tones of the modern classical, and the unexpectedness of the avant-garde jazz"

== Track listing ==
All compositions by Erik Friedlander.

1. "The Seducer" – 5:41
2. "Black Phebe" – 6:22
3. "A Single Eye" – 4:14
4. "Fracture" – 6:40
5. "Risky Business" – 3:22
6. "Tremors" – 7:16
7. "Small Things" – 6:13
8. "Solve Me" – 4:51
9. "Canoe" – 3:37
10. "Waterwheel" – 6:02
11. "Flycatcher" – 8:45
12. "Silk" – 3:23

== Personnel ==
- Erik Friedlander – cello
- Shoko Nagai – piano, accordion, electronics
- Satoshi Takeishi – percussion
