= Nighthawks (Erik Friedlander album) =

Studio album by Erik Friedlander
- Released: May 20, 2014
- Recorded: May 21–22, 2013
- Studio: The Bunker, Brooklyn, NY
- Genre: Avant-garde, jazz, Americana, contemporary classical music
- Length: 51:57
- Label: Skipstone; SSR018
- Producer: Erik Friedlander

Erik Friedlander chronology
Nothing On Earth (2013)	Nighthawks (2014)	Illuminations (2015)

Nighthawks is an album by cellist Erik Friedlander which was released in 2014 on the Skipstone label. The album was composed by Friedlander during a 5-day power outage following the impact of Hurricane Sandy.

== Reception ==
Professional ratings
Review scores
Source	Rating
All About Jazz	4/5 stars

In JazzTimes Shaun Brady wrote "Throughout Friedlander continues to expand the expressive vocabulary of the cello, striking violent abstractions one moment and aping the earthy sound of a battered acoustic guitar the next, with the agility to coax the instrument back into its familiar silken beauty in an instant. Wamble lends the quartet a virtuosic drawl, while the contributions of bassist Trevor Dunn and drummer Michael Sarin are subtle but vital". On Jazz Weekly, George W. Harris noted "This is music that is so sleek and subtle you’ll need to take in a few listens to really treasure what you’ve been given". Writing for All About Jazz, Troy Collins said "This collection of appealing instrumental songs, with its engaging rhythms, gorgeous melodies and spirited interplay, resounds as a reassuring testament to the power of the human spirit to persevere and carry on, no matter the odds".

== Track listing ==
All compositions by Erik Friedlander.

1. "Sneaky Pete" - 5:13
2. "Clockwork" - 5:14
3. "Hopper's Blue House" - 5:18
4. "Carom" - 3:02
5. "Nostalgia Blindside" - 4:56
6. "Gasoline Stations" - 4:35
7. "One Red Candle" - 5:18
8. "Poolhall Payback" - 4:11
9. "Nighthawks" - 7:52
10. "The River" - 6:18

== Personnel ==
- Erik Friedlander – cello
- Doug Wamble – guitar
- Trevor Dunn – bass
- Mike Sarin – drums
