= Illuminator =

Illuminator may refer to:

- A light source
- Limner, an illustrator of manuscripts
- Illuminator radar
- The Illuminator, a political art collective based in New York City
- Illuminator (Marvel Comics), a Christian superhero appearing in American comic books by Marvel Comics
- Illuminator (title), an Eastern Orthodox saint title

== People ==
- Gregory the Illuminator (250s–330s)
- Euthymius the Illuminator (950s–1020s)
- Saint Sava (1169/1174–1235/1236), known as the Illuminator of the Serbs

== See also ==
- Illuminate (disambiguation)
- Illuminated (disambiguation)
