= Illuminatus =

Illuminatus may refer to:

- singular of Illuminati
- Illuminatus of Arce (fl. 1219), companion of Saint Francis
- Illuminatus of Assisi (d. c. 1281), bishop
- The Illuminatus! Trilogy (1975), a series of novels by Robert Shea and Robert Anton Wilson
- Illuminatus (band), an alternative metal band from Nottingham
- Illuminatus (video game), a computer game originating from an April fool's joke
- Illuminatus, a 1995 album by Green Magnet School
