= Jan Johnston collaborations and unreleased works =

Since being discovered by BT in the mid-1990s, Jan Johnston has frequently performed as guest vocalist on many dance tracks, the majority of which have been released, with others that have not been. A full list is set out below.

== Collaborations (singles) ==
Year	Artist	Song	Notes
1995	Libra presents Taylor	"Anomaly – Calling Your Name"	BT–produced track which samples "The Prayer" ("Paris" B-side); UK No. 71
1997	Submerge	"Take Me By the Hand"	UK No. 28
1997	BT	"Remember"	UK No. 27
1998	Freefall	"Skydive"	Single release, re-issued in 2000 and 2001; UK No. 75 (1998); UK No. 43 (2000); UK No. 35 (2001)
1999	BT	"Mercury & Solace"	UK No. 38
1999	Libra presents Taylor	"Anomaly"	Remix/re-release with new video UK No. 43
2000	Tomski	"Love Will Come"	UK No. 31
2002	Cosmic Gate	"Raging (Storm)"	UK No. 48
2003	DJ Cor Fijneman	"Venus"	UK No. 109
2003	Paul van Dyk	"Nothing But You"	Also featuring Hemstock & Jennings and Kym; UK No. 14
2003	Svenson & Gielen	"Beachbreeze"	UK No. 163 (through import sales); Originally titled "Ocean"
2004	Serge Devant	"Transparent"	
2005	Cosmic Gate	"I Feel Wonderful"	An update of her song recorded with "Skydive"; UK No. 122
2006	Leama & Moor	"Waiting"	Originally titled "UR My Book"
2007	DJ Shah	"Beautiful"	
2007	R&Y	"It's Cold Outside"	
2007	J Joy	"Rush"	
2008	DJ Trenix	"Let The World Fall Apart"	
2008	Jussi Soro	"Merge"	
2008	Nektarios meets F-used	"Invisible Walls"	Collaboration with Nektarios and trance singer Kirsty Hawkshaw
2010	San	"Perfect Dream"	
2010	Tenishia	"Flesh 2010"	An update of her track "Flesh"
2011	Cosmic Gate	"Raging 2011"	An update of the track released in 2002
2011	Tartarus	"Something's Missing"	
2011	Nektarios meets F-used	"Invisible Walls 2011"	
2012	Dave D'Mello	"Remember"	An update of her track with BT
2012	Alexey Sonar	"Freedom"	
2012	Tenishia	"As It Should"	Originally recorded in 2007, the version released was an updated version.
2013	SNR & Rikkaz	"Beautiful Change"	
2013	Dr. K & Nii vs Shiha	"Dangerous"	Originally recorded in 2011 and named "Picture"
2013	DJ Feel	"Illuminate"	
2014	Obsidian Radio	"Love Like This (Beautiful Needs)"	
2014	Hemstock & Jennings	"Child of Forever"	
2015	Dr. K & Nii Vs. Shiha (feat. Nektarios)	"Angel of the Night"	Originally recorded with Nektarios in 2013; 2015 release is an updated version by Dr. K & Nii Vs. Shiha
2015	DJ Feel	"Skysearch"	
2015	Dirkie Coetzee	"Only the Beginning"	
2015	Dark Fusion	"Access All Areas"	
2015	Roman Messer	"Nebula"	
2016	Mark Sherry & Dark Fusion	"Deja Vu"	
2016	Hemstock & Jennings	"Child of Forever"	An update of the track released in 2013
2016	Angel Order	"Guilty Pleasure"	
2019	Henrik Nilsson	"Forever"	
2020	Henrik Nilsson	"Everytime"	
2020	DJ Xquizit	"Disoriented"	
2020	Trance Arts	"Sanctuary"	
2020	Emaar	"Read My Lips"	
2020	Paul Sawyer	"Circle"	
2020	Hemstock & Jennings	"Beautiful"	
2020	Aurosonic & Dmitry Strochenko	"Beautiful Chains"	
2020	Tycoos	"The Landslide"	
2021	Shades of Thunder	"How Loud Is Your Love"	
2021	James Kitcher, Adam Taylor	"Perfect Picture"	
2022	Opt-In	"Middle of Nowhere"	

== Album collaborations ==
In addition to the singles she has provided vocals for, Jan has also provided vocals to some artist albums with some of the tracks being released as singles.

Year	Artist	Song(s)	Album	Notes
1997	BT	"Remember"	ESCM	UK No. 35
1997	BT	"Lullaby for Gaia" (US version only)	ESCM	UK No. 35
1999	BT	"Mercury and Solace"	Movement in Still Life	UK No. 87; Backing vocals for "Dreaming" and "Running Down the Way Up" "Sunblind" also appears on R&R (Rare & Remixed)
1999	BT	"Sunblind" (Japanese version only)	Movement in Still Life	UK No. 87; Backing vocals for "Dreaming" and "Running Down the Way Up" "Sunblind" also appears on R&R (Rare & Remixed)
1999	BT	"Dreaming"	Movement in Still Life	UK No. 87; Backing vocals for "Dreaming" and "Running Down the Way Up" "Sunblind" also appears on R&R (Rare & Remixed)
1999	BT	"Running Down the Way Up"	Movement in Still Life	UK No. 87; Backing vocals for "Dreaming" and "Running Down the Way Up" "Sunblind" also appears on R&R (Rare & Remixed)
1999	Cloak	"Quiet Then"	Hackers Vol. 3	
2001	Tiësto	"Close to You"	In My Memory	UK No. 133
2002	Cosmic Gate	"Raging (Storm)"	No More Sleep	
2003	Paul van Dyk	"Kaleidoscope"	Reflections	UK No. 81 "Homage" was originally titled "I Don't Care". "Nothing But You" which features Norwegian vocals "Jeg har ingenting, men jeg har alt når jeg har deg" which translates to "I have nothing but I have everything when I have you."
2003	Paul van Dyk	"Homage"	Reflections	UK No. 81 "Homage" was originally titled "I Don't Care". "Nothing But You" which features Norwegian vocals "Jeg har ingenting, men jeg har alt når jeg har deg" which translates to "I have nothing but I have everything when I have you."
2003	Paul van Dyk	"Like a Friend"	Reflections	UK No. 81 "Homage" was originally titled "I Don't Care". "Nothing But You" which features Norwegian vocals "Jeg har ingenting, men jeg har alt når jeg har deg" which translates to "I have nothing but I have everything when I have you."
2003	Paul van Dyk	"Spellbound"	Reflections	UK No. 81 "Homage" was originally titled "I Don't Care". "Nothing But You" which features Norwegian vocals "Jeg har ingenting, men jeg har alt når jeg har deg" which translates to "I have nothing but I have everything when I have you."
2003	Paul van Dyk	"Nothing But You"	Reflections	UK No. 81 "Homage" was originally titled "I Don't Care". "Nothing But You" which features Norwegian vocals "Jeg har ingenting, men jeg har alt når jeg har deg" which translates to "I have nothing but I have everything when I have you."
2003	BT	"Communicate"	Emotional Technology	
2005	Paul Oakenfold	"Delirium"	The Club OST	Originally recorded with DJ Manalo
2006	Cosmic Gate	"This Is the Party"	Earth Mover	
2006	Cosmic Gate	"I Feel Wonderful"	Earth Mover	
2006	Leama & Moor	"Waiting"	Common Ground	
2006	Ernie Lake	"Daring"	From the Hamptons to Ibiza, Vol. 2 (Ernie Lake Presents Chill a Bit of Soul)	
2007	Paul Oakenfold	"More Than Human"	Vexille OST	
2008	DJ Shah	"Beautiful (Glimpse of Heaven)"	Songbook	
2012	Glassesboys	"Time Indefinite"		
2012	Tenishia	"As It Should"	Memory of a Dream	
2013	Alexander Popov	"Perfectly"	Personal Way	
2015	Michael Badal	"Unmissable"	Now That We're Human	
2019	Matt Darey	"Broken Wings"	Urban Astronauts	
2020	Trance Wax	"Nitedream"	Trance Wax	

== Unreleased works ==
Johnston has written and recorded many other tracks with various artists which have gone on to be unreleased or even released on promotional copies.

Artist	Song	Year	Notes
BT	"Confession" "Waiting for the Sun"	2001	Recorded for Emotional Technology
BT	"Shine"	2001	
BT	"Our Loving Silence" "Shattered" "Walking in a State of Wow"	2001	
Paul van Dyk	"Hurt" "Should I Break the Dawn" "Wow"	2003	
Serge Devant	"Asteroid" "Dangerous"	2004	
Matt Darey	"Broken Wings"	2006	
Upacchi (a.k.a. Emaar)	"Read My Lips"	2006	a.k.a. "It's Too Late"
Nektarios	"I Didn't Fall Down"	—	
Nektarios	"Inertia (Maybe I Got Confused)"	—	with Kirsty Hawkshaw
Kevin Sawka	"Lost"	2008	
Paul Oakenfold	"Mesmerised"	2008	
Paul Oakenfold	"Hurt" "Stay With Me Til Dawn"	—	
Bill Hamel	"Loves Garden"	—	
Adam Sheridan	"Hysteria"	2011	
Tartarus	"Define Love"	2011	
Walsh & McAuley	"Where Are You"	2011	

== Unreleased solo works ==
The majority of Jan Johnston's solo back catalogue has never been commercially released. Many of her recordings for Perfecto were issued on promotional copies as part of the aborted Emerging album campaign, whilst the majority for other labels have never even been released on promotional copies and are listed below.

- "Out There" (written with Tony Kirkham)
- "Crave" (1999) (written with Rob Davis)
- "Religion" (1999) (later remixed and renamed as "Halo")
- "Sunshine", "Mortal (Take Me Off the Planet)" and "Right to Be Miserable" (written and recorded with Jamie Myerson)
- "An Angel In His Eyes", "Anyway I Want", Beautiful Chains That Bind", "Captured", "Go Away", "Never Be Enough", "No Rules", "Pure Trip", "Waiting for No-one", "Don't Be a Stranger", "Crawling Across You", "Animal Zoo", "Bubble", "Slow Moving Together", "Starwatcher", "This Is My Dream", "Uncut Version", "Vibes in the Carpark", and "Energy"
- "No Mistake" (written with Mark James)
- "Crazy a Free Spirit" (written with Andi Red and Colin Snape)
- "Do I Confuse You" and "I'll Go No Protest" (written with Lazy - a.k.a. Kiran Shahani)
- "Breath" (written with Shelly Peiken and Sandy Stewart)
- "An Innocent Way" and "Beautiful" (written with James Exley)
- "Faking Smiles" and "Not Mine" (2004) (written and recorded with Uke & Kimik)
- "Close Your Eyes and Focus" (written with Skyko Tavis)
- "Kiss the Silence" (2011)
