= Iceleak =

Italian-Luxembourgish DJ and record producer (born 1993)

- Born: Filippo Gorla; 17 July 1993 (age 33)
- Origin: Luxembourg City, Luxembourg
- Genres: EDM; Tropical; electronic; house
- Occupation: DJ/Producer
- Instrument: Ableton
- Years active: 2017–present
- Labels: Ultra Music; Spinnin' Records; AFTR:HRS/Musical Freedom; FRCST RCRDS
- Website: spoti.fi/2MZaThS

Iceleak is the stage name of Filippo Gorla (born 17 July 1993), an Italian-Luxembourgish DJ and producer.

== Music career ==
=== Early career ===
Filippo started Iceleak after producing music for a successful Luxembourgish electro-dubstep duo named Dead C∆T Bounce which counts more than 3 million plays on SoundCloud, 1 million views on YouTube and has performed in numerous European clubs and festivals like Rock-A-Field, Social Club Paris, Rockhal, etc.

=== Present career ===
Iceleak's first single, "Danger", was released on Disco Fries' label Liftoff Recordings. Their follow up releases, "Don't Leave Me", and "Wavy", were released on Tiësto's label AFTR:HRS/Musical Freedom, and on Spinnin' Records respectively. Iceleak collaborated with singer Karl Michael to perform vocals for both "Danger" and "Don’t Leave Me". The lyrics to "Wavy" were written by Joe Killington. Later, Iceleak released "Something In The Water", their first single with Ultra Music Records, which was written by Jenson Vaughan and featured vocals by Craig Smart and followed up with "Fighting Mirrors" on ChillYourMind with lyrics written by Victoria Horn and sung by Jack Hawitt. Most recently, Iceleak released "Anywhere" with lyrics written and sung by Kye Sones on KnightVision Records.

== Discography ==
=== Singles ===
Date	Track	Label
9 December 2022	"Can't Say No"	FRCST RCRDS
16 Septembre 2022	"Last Love" (with Bolier)	FRCST RCRDS
24 June 2022	"Illuminate" (with Rory Hope & New Arena)	Atlast
13 May 2022	"What You Want" (with Dualhï)	1st Strike
4 February 2022	"No More"	FRCST RCRDS
14 July 2021	"Tongue Tied" (feat. LOMI)	Magic Records
3 July 2020	"Memories"	Metanoia Music
8 November 2019	"Waiting for You" (with Widemode)	ChillYourMind
16 August 2019	"Anywhere" (feat. Kye Sones)	KnightVision Records
19 April 2019	"Fighting Mirrors"	ChillYourMind
7 September 2018	"Something In The Water"	Ultra Music
18 May 2018	"Wavy"	Spinnin' Records
24 November 2017	"Danger (Remix) EP" (feat. Karl Michael)	Liftoff Recordings
13 October 2017	"Don't Leave Me" (feat. Karl Michael)	AFTR:HRS/Musical Freedom
10 February 2017	"Danger" (feat. Karl Michael)	Liftoff Recordings

=== Mixes ===
Guest on Tiësto Club Life podcast #597 (8 September 2018)
