= Unlike Pluto =

American singer, songwriter (born 1991)

- Born: Armond Arabshahi; June 3, 1991 (age 35); Atlanta, Georgia, USA
- Origin: Los Angeles, California, USA
- Genres: Electronic rock; indie rock; alternative rock; rock; heavy metal; grunge; EDM (early)
- Instruments: digital audio workstation; guitar; drums; piano; clarinet; vocals
- Years active: 2013–present
- Labels: Proximity; Enhanced Recordings; Mad Decent; Spinnin' Records; Ultra Records; Monstercat; Heroic Recordings; NIGHT MODE; NoCopyrightSounds; Lowly Palace; Sumerian Records
- Member of: Like Saturn, Why Mona
- Website: https://unlikepluto.com/

Armond Arabshahi, known by his stage name Unlike Pluto, is an American singer, songwriter, music producer, and former DJ. He is mainly known for his song "Everything Black", released under the record label Monstercat in 2017, which he produced with Philadelphia-based vocalist and DJ Mike Taylor. He is also known for his Pluto Tapes series of albums, a project he started on May 30, 2018, where he challenges himself to release one song per week, experimenting with different genres and developing his style. Besides the Pluto Tapes, he also has a side project called Why Mona with stage actress and singer Joanna Jones. Another side project of his is Like Saturn, where he produces relaxing and emotional Lofi instrumentals. He also recently began a side project named UPxMT with Mike Taylor.

== Background ==
Arabshahi was born and raised in Atlanta, Georgia. He began teaching himself how to play piano at the age of 5, later learning to play the guitar, the drums, and the clarinet. He later decided he wanted to produce music as his career, being inspired by other musicians such as System of a Down, Chevelle, Incubus, Gorillaz, Radiohead, Linkin Park, Sublime, Simon & Garfunkel, Underoath, and many more. He also claimed to be inspired by the mixtapes many rappers would hand out on the streets of Atlanta. At 18, he created the alias "Unlike Pluto, due to Pluto having been his favourite planet growing up.

Arabshahi attended Georgia State University and Emory University in Georgia, graduating in 2013. During his time at Emory, he enjoyed producing multiple styles of EDM, such as dubstep, house, trap, etc., and eventually independently released his first ever studio album We Are Plutonians on March 12, 2013.

== Early career ==
By 2014, Arabshahi started his career creating and releasing unofficial remixes on his SoundCloud. His remix of Diplo's "Revolution" was picked up by the label Mad Decent after garnering popularity. In 2015, Armond started working with Mad Decent more as he would release two digital A-side and B-side records with Kickraux under the label, called "Palace" and "Tew", with "Palace" currently achieving over 2.2 million plays on SoundCloud. He released a few more remixes independently until mid 2016, where he released the single "Waiting For You" under the label Monstercat, which currently has over 3.8 million plays on SoundCloud, with his long-time friend Joanna Jones, a singer and actress currently known for her performance in the musical Hamilton on Broadway. Then, after two more remixes released under Ultra Records and Spinnin' Records, he would confide in Mad Decent and Monstercat again to find multiple talented singers and writers to produce music with before he even revealed his voice. With these singers, he released a single called "Found You" featuring Michelle Buzz and two more A-side and B-side records named "Soul" featuring Q'AILA and "Show Me Love" featuring Michelle Buzz under Mad Decent, and two singles called "Searching for You" featuring Karra & Eric Zayne, and "Someone New" featuring Desi Valentine under Monstercat. At this point, he had already accomplished over 20 million plays on his SoundCloud overall, was included in Billboard's "Dance artists to watch" article, and began performing at concerts again, touring at multiple music festivals around the world, such as Ultra Music Festival, Bestival, Fvded In The Park, and HARD Summer Music Festival, where he would play his own remixes and songs. By early 2017, he did one more official remix as he looked for an independent label to aid him, and found Lowly Palace (Lowly), whose parent label is Trap Nation. With them, Armond revealed his vocals for the first time with his single "Worst In Me", released on February 21, 2017. After that, he paired up with Monstercat again and released the singles "Sweet" featuring Mister Blonde and "Everything Black" featuring Mike Taylor, with "Everything Black" very quickly becoming his most famous song, and still is with two gold certifications in 2021 and 2024. Due to its success, he announced a tour for the song after its release in March, where he would play the song alongside his others at large festivals including Lollapalooza, Bonnaroo, and EUPHORIA. The song was not only popular in the music industry, but also in the gaming community, as thousands of streamers played it as one of their songs for background music in their livestreams on the streaming platform Twitch. The song also plays in the competitive, multiplayer vehicular soccer game Rocket League.

In late 2017, the producer gradually and artfully combined some of his favorite genres together, like alternative rock, rock, pop, and indie rock, alongside his electronic background. This created a unique range of electronic/alternative rock and alternative pop, with an emotional, meaningful twist that stands out as a "new genre" of his own. This intrigued many people in his past and gained the interest of not only new fans, but also previous ones. With Lowly Palace again, he started to make this transition known with the single "Let It Bleed" featuring Cristina Gatti, and a cover of TLC's "No Scrubs" with Joanna Jones, which did incredibly well, going viral across multiple platforms and currently has 35 million views on YouTube. Seeing the success he had every time he produced with Joanna and being a good friend of his, Armond decided to start up a side project called Why Mona, six months after "No Scrubs", where he started out producing covers of old school classics with her vocals, then eventually original singles that she would write. When he announced the project, they released a cover of Queen's "We Will Rock You" the same day, August 11, 2017.

However, despite the massive amount of progress in his career he's made thus far and the fun times he had, Armond ultimately decided he wanted to leave EDM behind him as he noticed his success lessened and became harder to maintain/gain with the changing environment surrounding EDM. He wanted to move past the genre, dive more into his creative desires, and experiment with his music style, eventually settling with and signing a recording contract under the, now former, independent label and artist management company Heroic Recordings (Heroic/Heroic Music Group). So, by November 2017, when he released another single with his vocals called "I Need A Win" under Heroic, the transition in music genre was clear despite still having an electronic influence in his songs. In an interview with Catherine Zhang in April 2017, Armond explains:

"In 2011, the electronic music scene was still pretty new. You could just make a random beat and release it on SoundCloud by yourself, and just email a shit ton of blogs. Now it's not like that anymore. Now you need connections, you need to have a name for yourself before you even hit up these blogs. I will probably go crazy if I only do EDM for the rest of my life. That being said, there are lots of things to do in EDM. You can combine any genre you want..."

He stopped touring in mid 2018 after releasing two more singles called "Nothing Wrong With Me" and "Fade All My Life", with his last festival being at the Shaky Beats Festival from May 11 - May 13, 2018.

== Mid Career ==
Armond maintained a theme of music that is lyrically and musically dark. Since the planet Pluto became a "dwarf planet" and he viewed himself as an outcast, he compared himself to the planet which matched his style of music. He made multiple digital A-side and B-side records under Heroic, where he showed his new, more apparent style of alternative rock, screamo, grunge, emo, indie rock, and electronic inspired music. In the midst of these records, he started his new project "Pluto Tapes" under Heroic on May 30, 2018, alongside the first Pluto Tape release "Run, Bobby, Run". The project was made so he could release hundreds of his creative song ideas as often as possible and explore with his style in a way he never thought of before. He released songs weekly, and a lot of the time it was a stress reliever and a fun way for him to make new, unique music, keeping his inspiration up as well as being a welcome challenge. Since the project was made, his fanbase grew and formed into a tightly knit community and one that he interacts with often. Unlike Pluto is an emerging force in the space he's carved out for himself, with his talent and unique style, characterized by his meaningful songwriting and distinctive voice. He started to have a lot of success once again, but in the way he wanted to the most, and put out three Pluto Tape albums, or volumes, within the year 2019 all under Heroic. In his words:

"The Pluto Tapes started as an experiment for me to release more music - I wanted to see what it would be like to release a song every week. I start a new song idea every day. A lot of those don't even make the cut, but it gets my creativity flowing. The Pluto Tapes have now become my outlet to push my creative boundaries and challenge myself."

Once a certain amount of songs were released, they would be repackaged into a volume before beginning the next one with the same process. Each volume was different, but still had the same recognizable style that is Unlike Pluto, progressively getting much more away from the EDM light and improving in production quality. He began to show himself more in the song covers and with music videos by Pluto Tapes: Volume 2, displaying more professional advertising and comfort promoting himself. In late 2019, he went back to being an independent musician when his contract with Heroic ended. Armond released a single under the independent label NIGHT MODE called "Everything You Need" on November 29, 2019, where he stepped back into his classic EDM production for the house style song, and an EP under Heroic called life in minor on November 15, 2019. Pluto Tapes also came to a close and he had a hiatus, during which, he also started his side project "Like Saturn" on February 14, 2020 alongside the release of the song "All Alone".

== Late Career and Current ==
His hiatus lasted from November 2019 to March 2020, where he came back with an independently released single called "Life in A Hole". Breaking his silence, Armond explains the song:

"'Life in a Hole' is a song I made in an AirBnb in Atlanta with two of my best friends and co-writers. It's an upbeat melodic song with Drum and Bass influence about what it feels like to climb out of rock bottom. During that time we were listening to a lot of 90's and mid-2000's drum and bass, so we took those influences along with my alternative rock style juxtaposing a unique sound. I just want to keep experimenting with music with high energy and lyrics that people can relate to, because that's what music is all about for me."

Because of his love for and success of Pluto Tapes though, he didn't stop releasing weekly and evolving his style once he returned, and, similar to the project, had a planned amount of songs he would release and repackage into albums, however just not as part of the Pluto Tapes. His comeback was big despite not continuing the project, especially with his once again evolved style, which his loyal fans, along with new ones, were thrilled by with his exciting diversity. Armond went on to make several albums varying in different genres, but still his "own", over the course of 2020-2022, garnering more attention and fans. He had many songs go viral, such as "8 Legged Dreams" and "Rose Colored Lenses", which both came out in 2020 on separate albums. By 2023, Armond started to shift a lot more into an alternative/electronic rock and rock style as he needed consistency to see more success, rather than making different kinds of songs each release, during and after his fifth album Cherry Blossom Nightmare. "As they Bloom" became quite popular from this album, and amassed over 1.1 million views on YouTube, and over 5 million streams on Spotify. He also released a vinyl for the album on November 2, 2023, over a year after the album's release. He eventually did find a solid place in alternative rock, rock, and metal, lessened the frequency of releases to every other week, and soon every month when releasing the songs for his sixth album, Dizzy Bezerko. He wanted to spend more time on his songs to improve the writing and quality, as he simply couldn't if he kept releasing weekly, which also began to finally burn him out. Fortunately though, he had two songs do well on this album as well, with "Guts" gaining almost one million views on YouTube, and "Rip Me Apart" gaining over 700k streams on Spotify.

Pluto Tapes did not end permanently however, as in November 2023, in the midst of him releasing songs for his upcoming album in June 2024, he announced the projects return alongside a new Pluto Tape release called "Smile on my Face" only on YouTube. In the description, he explains that he has a lot of leftover songs that Heroic supposedly did not deem worthy of release on Spotify when he was still signed under them, so he wants to bring the project back, especially as he still loves it and creating these fun songs. He plans on releasing the new Pluto Tapes only on YouTube, before being repackaged into the fourth volume and released on all platforms around mid to late July 2024. This also brings upon the opportunities of keeping the fans who love the weekly releases fulfilled, and having the songs act as fillers in between his monthly releases. It already is proving successful and well-liked, as the songs get over 10k views on YouTube after just one day of being released. The album is now done and set for release, as he already begins new weekly Pluto Tapes for the next volume, kicking it off with a demo Why Mona collab.

Currently in 2024, alongside the weekly Pluto Tape releases, Armond continues to release more songs every month for the two albums he has planned for the year, and has just released the first of the two called "Ghost Gardens" on June 14, 2024. He also will hopefully release another special collaboration album that is yet to be revealed. He explains this, and more, in a YouTube video he uploaded on January 11, 2024, titled "my plans for 2024 and music". The songs are already doing quite well too, gaining over 100k streams of traction on Spotify just four to five days after being released. In the video, Armond has also announced the release of his new manga, called Dada Immortal, which went through a long trial and error process for over two years. The manga was inspired by his love for writing supernatural style stories and newfound love for Japanese anime and manga, which started around 2021-2022. He is publishing independently under the name "Nada Nada" with his friend and graphic designer Protski, who makes the art for Unlike Pluto, and Protski's wife, Gabi. Armond also released a special cover with Sumerian Records, for the "American Psycho" comic series soundtrack, of Eurythimic's "Sweet Dreams (Are Made of This)", that both him and Joanna sang together. Sumerian also teamed up with him to release his own version of Palaye Royale's "Dead To Me", written with different verses and sung by Joanna Jones. However, it wasn't just her, as he partnered with Palaye Royale's vocalist himself to combine new vocals of his with hers in the chorus, bringing back his original influence. He has announced that he may be working on tours for 2025. He also had his first release on NCS with the single "Hollow" on April 12, 2024.

=== Why Mona ===
In August 2017, Armond announced a new side project called Why Mona with Joanna Jones, one of his best friends, and released a cover of Queen's song "We Will Rock You" the same day. The name was created based on his older sister's name, Mona, and the pair started out releasing covers sung by Joanna and produced by Armond with his unique electronic rock style, before transitioning to just making originals in the style of electronic indie pop, written and sung by Joanna. Joanna is a singer and actress who hails from Broadway, where she's currently starring in the roles of Maria Reynolds and Peggy Schuyler in the critically acclaimed Broadway hit musical Hamilton.

In 2019 and again in 2022, the duo's cover of "Wannabe" by Spice Girls went viral on TikTok, amassing over 10 million unique video creations by users on the platform. In 2020, they were releasing singles monthly before taking a two year hiatus and returning in 2022 and 2023. In 2021, Dell computers released an ad that featured their original track "Rabbit Hole", which introduced a lot of viewers to this song and group. Despite only putting out three singles in 2022 and clearly slowing down in releases, Joanna was still active on the YouTube channel and continued to perform multiple live covers of different songs, until they released another cover together of Kate Bush's "Running Up That Hill (Deal With God)" on August 5, 2022, before once again going inactive until June 30, 2023, releasing another single named "Dollhouse". Afterwards, Armond and Joanna made multiple demos, and even two demo remixes of their song "forest green" and Unlike Pluto and Why Mona collab song "Quintana Roo", that they published only on the YouTube channel. They have since been on a hiatus, but Armond still makes music with her in the form of collabs.

=== Like Saturn ===
In 2020, Armond began another side project called Like Saturn, a name that plays off of his stage name, derived from his love of the Lofi genre where he makes his own version of chill, emotional Lofi. The songs require low effort, are fun to make, and another way for him to create freely. He does weekly releases with this project as well that he repackages into albums, and continues to do so consistently into 2024, sometimes alongside his partner.

== Discography ==
=== Studio albums ===
Title	Album details
We Are Plutonians	Released: March 12, 2013; Label: Self-released
Pluto Tapes: Volume 1	Released: January 25, 2019; Label: Self-released
Pluto Tapes: Volume 2	Released: April 19, 2019; Label: Self-released
Pluto Tapes: Volume 3	Released: August 1, 2019; Label: Self-released
Messy Mind	Released: August 19, 2020; Label: Self-released
Technicolor Daydream	Released: April 23, 2021; Label: Self-released
Loud Fantasy, Quiet Reality	Released: November 5, 2021; Label: Self-released
Pixelated Oblivion	Released: May 27, 2022; Label: Self-released
Cherry Blossom Nightmare	Released: November 18, 2022; Label: Self-released
Dizzy Bezerko	Released: August 25, 2023; Label: Self-released
Ghost Gardens	Released: June 14, 2024; Label: Self-released
Pluto Tapes: Volume 4	Released: July 12, 2024; Label: Self-released
Kiss Collapse	Released: August 22, 2025; Label: CloudKid
Double Daze	Released: June 12, 2026; Label: CloudKid

=== Extended Plays (EPs) ===
Title	Album details
Life In Minor	Released: November 15, 2019; Label: Self-released

=== Singles ===
Title	Year	Album
"Bollywood Summer"	2013	Non-album single
"Jacque Sparrow" (featuring Vafa Sobhani)	2013	We Are Plutonians
"Suicide Monster"	2013	We Are Plutonians
"Run Maggie Run" (featuring Vafa Sobhani)	2013	We Are Plutonians
"The Disarray"	2013	We Are Plutonians
"Girl, Walk This Plank" (featuring Vafa Sobhani)	2013	We Are Plutonians
"Write On Bathroom Walls"	2013	We Are Plutonians
"Ye Scallywag"	2013	We Are Plutonians
"Sky Drop"	2013	We Are Plutonians
"Broken Bagpipes"	2013	We Are Plutonians
"Icicle Engineer"	2013	We Are Plutonians
"Newfinland" (featuring Vafa Sobhani)	2013	We Are Plutonians
"Dwarf Planet"	2013	We Are Plutonians
"Nile"	2013	We Are Plutonians
"Dinosauria"	2013	We Are Plutonians
"Turn Around" (featuring Vafa Sobhani)	2013	We Are Plutonians
"No Oxygen"	2013	We Are Plutonians
"Gentle Creatures"	2013	We Are Plutonians
"No Inspiration"	2013	We Are Plutonians
"Rumpel"	2013	We Are Plutonians
"Robots, They Are"	2013	We Are Plutonians
"Snule"	2014	Non-album singles
"Fud"	2014	Non-album singles
"Palace" (with Kickraux)	2015	A-side and B-side
"Tew" (with Kickraux)	2015	A-side and B-side
"Show Me Love" (featuring Michelle Buzz)	2016	Show Me Love (A-side and B-side)
"Soul" (featuring Q'AILA)	2016	Show Me Love (A-side and B-side)
"Waiting for You" (featuring Joanna Jones)	2016	Non-album singles
"Searching for You" (featuring Karra and Eric Zayne)	2016	Non-album singles
"Someone New" (featuring Desi Valentine)	2016	Non-album singles
"Found You" (featuring Michelle Buzz)	2016	Non-album singles
"Worst in Me"	2017	Non-album singles
"Everything Black" (featuring Mike Taylor)	2017	Non-album singles
"No Scrubs" (featuring Joanna Jones)	2017	Non-album singles
"Sweet" (featuring Mister Blonde)	2017	Non-album singles
"Let It Bleed" (featuring Cristina Gatti)	2017	Non-album singles
"I Need A Win"	2017	Non-album singles
"Nothing Wrong With Me"	2017	Non-album singles
"Fade All My Life"	2018	Non-album singles
"Where Is My Mind?" (Cover)	2018	Non-album singles
"Helena" (Cover)	2018	Non-album singles
"Late Bloomer"	2018	A-side and B-side
"I Tried Getting High"	2018	A-side and B-side
"WHY"	2018	Fake Smiles, Real Memories (A-side and B-side)
"JOLT"	2018	Fake Smiles, Real Memories (A-side and B-side)
"Ladida"	2018	Bitter Paradise (A-side and B-side)
"Now I Don't Care"	2018	Bitter Paradise (A-side and B-side)
"Closure (Year 09)"	2018	Lost Losers Club (A-side and B-side)
"Dearly Departed"	2018	Lost Losers Club (A-side and B-side)
"Dollar For Your Sadness"	2018	Pluto Tapes: Volume 1
"Don't Know What to Say"	2018	Pluto Tapes: Volume 1
"First Generation"	2018	Pluto Tapes: Volume 1
"Canada"	2018	Pluto Tapes: Volume 1
"Unless It Happens To You"	2018	Pluto Tapes: Volume 1
"Ethel"	2018	Pluto Tapes: Volume 1
"Western Love"	2018	Pluto Tapes: Volume 1
"Look At Me"	2018	Pluto Tapes: Volume 1
"Playground"	2018	Pluto Tapes: Volume 1
"I Can Be Louder"	2018	Pluto Tapes: Volume 1
"Death Of Me"	2018	Pluto Tapes: Volume 1
"Cruel"	2018	Pluto Tapes: Volume 1
"No Innocence"	2018	Pluto Tapes: Volume 1
"No Goodbyes"	2018	Pluto Tapes: Volume 1
"Run Bobby Run"	2018	Pluto Tapes: Volume 1
"Mosh Pit"	2018	Pluto Tapes: Volume 1
"Under The Lights"	2018	Pluto Tapes: Volume 1
"Problems"	2018	Pluto Tapes: Volume 1
"Burn After Writing"	2018	Pluto Tapes: Volume 1
"Pumpkin Factory"	2018	Non-album singles
"Scrooge Syndrome"	2018	Non-album singles
"Riptide"	2019	Pluto Tapes: Volume 2
"Villain Of My Own Story"	2019	Pluto Tapes: Volume 2
"Adios"	2019	Pluto Tapes: Volume 2
"No Rainbows In The Desert"	2019	Pluto Tapes: Volume 2
"Illusion"	2019	Pluto Tapes: Volume 2
"Wishing Well"	2019	Pluto Tapes: Volume 2
"Misdiagnosed"	2019	Pluto Tapes: Volume 2
"Dosage"	2019	Pluto Tapes: Volume 2
"Yes Offense"	2019	Pluto Tapes: Volume 2
"Destroy, Build, Destroy"	2019	Pluto Tapes: Volume 2
"Halley's Comet"	2019	Pluto Tapes: Volume 2
"New Life, Who Dis?"	2019	Pluto Tapes: Volume 2
"Closed Loop"	2019	Pluto Tapes: Volume 2
"Pumpkin Factory 2"	2019	Non-album Single
"Oh Raven (Sing Me A Happy Song)"	2019	Pluto Tapes: Volume 3
"Revenge, And a Little More"	2019	Pluto Tapes: Volume 3
"Sin Circus"	2019	Pluto Tapes: Volume 3
"Brain, Brain, Go Away"	2019	Pluto Tapes: Volume 3
"Not Today"	2019	Pluto Tapes: Volume 3
"Everything About Nothing"	2019	Pluto Tapes: Volume 3
"Damage Control"	2019	Pluto Tapes: Volume 3
"A Million Voices"	2019	Pluto Tapes: Volume 3
"Night Light"	2019	Pluto Tapes: Volume 3
"No Debate"	2019	Pluto Tapes: Volume 3
"Coffee Stains"	2019	Life in Minor (EP)
"Death In Paradise"	2019	Life in Minor (EP)
"Silver Screen Life"	2019	Life in Minor (EP)
"Stay and Decay"	2019	Life in Minor (EP)
"Sanity"	2019	Life in Minor (EP)
"Crocodile Tears"	2019	Life in Minor (EP)
"Everything You Need"	2019	Non-album singles
"Life in A Hole"	2020	Non-album singles
"Crawling"	2020	Non-album singles
"The Underground" (with 8 Graves)	2020	Non-album singles
"Pumpkin Factory 3"	2020	Non-album singles
"8 Legged Dreams"	2020	Messy Mind
"Shadow"	2020	Messy Mind
"Starlight"	2020	Messy Mind
"That's What She Said" (featuring Coruja)	2020	Messy Mind
"Gaze"	2020	Messy Mind
"Yippee Ki Yay"	2020	Messy Mind
"Overwhelmed"	2020	Messy Mind
"Mindless Bliss"	2020	Messy Mind
"Painted Dreams"	2020	Messy Mind
"Nicotine" (featuring Joanna Jones)	2020	Messy Mind
"Broken String"	2020	Messy Mind
"FMO"	2020	Messy Mind
"Stir Crazy"	2020	Messy Mind
"Lullaby"	2020	Messy Mind
"Pocket Symphony"	2020	Messy Mind
"Morphine"	2020	Messy Mind
"Regret Roulette"	2020	Messy Mind
"Cosmo's Interlude"	2020	Messy Mind
"Candid"	2020	Technicolor Daydream
"Wrong Faces Wrong Places"	2020	Technicolor Daydream
"Moving Too Quickly"	2020	Technicolor Daydream
"Addict"	2020	Technicolor Daydream
"Don't Wait For Me"	2020	Technicolor Daydream
"Rose Colored Lenses"	2020	Technicolor Daydream
"Soft Spoken"	2020	Technicolor Daydream
"Poster Boy"	2021	Technicolor Daydream
"Sabotage"	2021	Technicolor Daydream
"Zoned Out In My Youth"	2021	Technicolor Daydream
"Belly Flop"	2021	Technicolor Daydream
"Interstellar Weather"	2021	Technicolor Daydream
"Fallen Parachutes"	2021	Technicolor Daydream
"Ricochet On My Mind"	2021	Technicolor Daydream
"Pumpkin Factory 4"	2021	Non-album singles
"Quintana Roo" (with Why Mona)	2021	Non-album singles
"Circular Motion" (with Why Mona)	2021	Non-album singles
"Rewind" (with Why Mona)	2021	Non-album singles
"Talk Heavy" (featuring Mike Taylor)	2021	Non-album singles
"Hummingbird"	2021	Loud Fantasy, Quiet Reality
"Talladega Knights"	2021	Loud Fantasy, Quiet Reality
"A Cautionary Tale"	2021	Loud Fantasy, Quiet Reality
"Lavender"	2021	Loud Fantasy, Quiet Reality
"We're Screwed"	2021	Loud Fantasy, Quiet Reality
"Perfect Season"	2021	Loud Fantasy, Quiet Reality
"Sailing Colors"	2021	Loud Fantasy, Quiet Reality
"Elephant Ears"	2021	Loud Fantasy, Quiet Reality
"Conspiracy"	2021	Loud Fantasy, Quiet Reality
"Endless"	2021	Loud Fantasy, Quiet Reality
"Origami"	2021	Loud Fantasy, Quiet Reality
"Better Luck Next Life"	2021	Loud Fantasy, Quiet Reality
"Belladonna"	2021	Loud Fantasy, Quiet Reality
"Everybody is Interesting"	2021	Loud Fantasy, Quiet Reality
"Mystery Of Me"	2021	Loud Fantasy, Quiet Reality
"Digital Junkie"	2022	Pixelated Oblivion
"Harlequin"	2022	Pixelated Oblivion
"I Don't Daydream Anymore"	2022	Pixelated Oblivion
"Smoke In My Heart"	2022	Pixelated Oblivion
"Cold Weather"	2022	Pixelated Oblivion
"Silly How I Feel (so silly silly)"	2022	Pixelated Oblivion
"Shelf Life"	2022	Pixelated Oblivion
"Have Fun"	2022	Pixelated Oblivion
"Comatose Scenery"	2022	Pixelated Oblivion
"Crash and Burn"	2022	Pixelated Oblivion
"Against the Timeline"	2022	Pixelated Oblivion
"Sorry To Bother You"	2022	Pixelated Oblivion
"It Goes Inside My Head"	2022	Pixelated Oblivion
"Fool's Paradise"	2022	Pixelated Oblivion
"I'm Not Surprised"	2022	Pixelated Oblivion
"Best At Being The Worst"	2022	Cherry Blossom Nightmare
"As They Bloom"	2022	Cherry Blossom Nightmare
"More Than I Remember You"	2022	Cherry Blossom Nightmare
"My Life Away"	2022	Cherry Blossom Nightmare
"Drown Me"	2022	Cherry Blossom Nightmare
"Intoxicate Me"	2022	Cherry Blossom Nightmare
"Rain On My Happy Days"	2022	Cherry Blossom Nightmare
"Stuck"	2022	Cherry Blossom Nightmare
"Sinking Sand"	2022	Cherry Blossom Nightmare
"Supposed To Fall"	2022	Cherry Blossom Nightmare
"If It's Vengeance You Want"	2022	Cherry Blossom Nightmare
"Dread"	2022	Cherry Blossom Nightmare
"Fata Morgana"	2022	Cherry Blossom Nightmare
"Reset Rewind"	2022	Cherry Blossom Nightmare
"Question"	2022	Cherry Blossom Nightmare
"PUMPKIN FACTORY 5 - PHONK HALLOWEEN"	2022	Non-album singles
"Guts"	2023	Dizzy Bezerko
"Sunlight or Demise"	2023	Dizzy Bezerko
"To the Toxic People"	2023	Dizzy Bezerko
"Goner"	2023	Dizzy Bezerko
"Twisted"	2023	Dizzy Bezerko
"Synthetic Tragedy"	2023	Dizzy Bezerko
"Curse"	2023	Dizzy Bezerko
"Can't Have it All"	2023	Dizzy Bezerko
"Color Chaos"	2023	Dizzy Bezerko
"Dreamblur"	2023	Dizzy Bezerko
"Ridiculous"	2023	Dizzy Bezerko
"Losing Myself to Find You"	2023	Dizzy Bezerko
"Neons Away"	2023	Dizzy Bezerko
"Utopia"	2023	Dizzy Bezerko
"Twilight Tears"	2023	Dizzy Bezerko
"Tremor"	2023	Dizzy Bezerko
"Smile on my Face"	2023	Pluto Tapes: Volume 4
"Who's the Dreamer"	2023	Pluto Tapes: Volume 4
"Headless"	2024	Pluto Tapes: Volume 4
"Sentimental"	2024	Pluto Tapes: Volume 4
"Red Dress"	2024	Pluto Tapes: Volume 4
"Slingshot"	2024	Pluto Tapes: Volume 4
"Now That You're Gone"	2024	Pluto Tapes: Volume 4
"My Heaven Became..."	2024	Pluto Tapes: Volume 4
"Doomed"	2024	Pluto Tapes: Volume 4
"Slaughterhouse"	2024	Pluto Tapes: Volume 4
"Starry"	2024	Pluto Tapes: Volume 4
"Hollow"	2024	Non-album singles
"Sweet Dreams" (with Joanna Jones)	2024	Non-album singles
"Dead To Me (Reimagined)" (with Joanna Jones & Palaye Royale)	2024	Non-album singles
"Time Is Eating"	2024	Non-album singles
"Rip Me Apart"	2024	Ghost Gardens
"Dig"	2024	Ghost Gardens
"Tremor"	2024	Ghost Gardens
"Lethal Poetry"	2024	Ghost Gardens
"Lost Inside"	2024	Ghost Gardens
"Flutter"	2024	Ghost Gardens
"Fragile Skin Of Me"	2024	Ghost Gardens
"Is It Victory"	2024	Ghost Gardens
"Misery"	2024	Ghost Gardens
"One on One"	2024	Ghost Gardens
"Infinity"	2024	Ghost Gardens
"Glory"	2024	Ghost Gardens
"Black Lotus"	2024	Ghost Gardens
"Frozen in Time"	2024	Ghost Gardens
"Clouded"	2024	Ghost Gardens
"Figueroa (DEMO)" (featuring Why Mona)	2024	Pluto Tapes: Volume 5
"Caffeine"	2024	Pluto Tapes: Volume 5
"Suckerpunch" [PLUTO TAPE VERSION]	2024	Pluto Tapes: Volume 5
"Wings To Dreams"	2024	Pluto Tapes: Volume 5
"Away From Sunlight"	2024	Pluto Tapes: Volume 5
"Now"	2024	Pluto Tapes: Volume 5
"Don't Take My Euphoria"	2024	Pluto Tapes: Volume 5
"Clone Army"	2024	Pluto Tapes: Volume 5
"Boom"		Kiss Collapse
"Trance"		Kiss Collapse
"Bleed Me Dry"		Kiss Collapse
"Letting Go"		Kiss Collapse
"Is My Vision Scarred"		Kiss Collapse
"Hide My Tears"		Kiss Collapse
"Betray"		Kiss Collapse
"50 50"		Kiss Collapse
"Overstimulated"		Kiss Collapse
"Wrong"		Kiss Collapse
"Paranoir"		Kiss Collapse
"Crown"		Kiss Collapse
"Whisper To Me"	2025	Kiss Collapse
"If I Dissapear"	2025	Kiss Collapse
"Insanium"	2025	Kiss Collapse
"Suckerpunch"	2025	Kiss Collapse
"After The Rain"	2025	Kiss Collapse
"Design"	2026	Double Daze
"Fake Flowers"	2026	Double Daze
"Get Out Of My Head"	2026	Double Daze
"Smile Like It Doesn't Sting"	2026	Double Daze
"Thread"	2026	Double Daze
"Dream"	2026	Double Daze
"Cosmos Interlude pt.2"	2026	Double Daze
"Night"	2026	Double Daze
"The In-between"	2026	Double Daze
"Romanticize The Meltdown"	2026	Double Daze
"Spill"	2026	Double Daze
"Quietly"	2026	Double Daze
"Invent"	2026	Double Daze
"Before You See The Real Me"	2026	Unknown ongoing
"Take"	2026	Unknown ongoing
"Blink"	2026	Unknown ongoing
"Throne In An Empty Room"	2026	Unknown ongoing
"Wake Me"	2026	Unknown ongoing
"If You Don't Mind"	2026	Unknown ongoing
"Thorns"	2026	Unknown ongoing
"This Is What My Silence Means"	2026	Unknown ongoing
"Never Shine again"	2026	Unknown ongoing
"Falling Behind"	2026	Unknown ongoing

=== Collaborations ===
- Unlike Pluto & Kickraux - Palace (2015)
- Seven Lions & Unlike Pluto - Rescue Me (2017)
- Unlike Pluto & Why Mona - Quintana Roo (2021)
- Unlike Pluto & Why Mona - Circular Motion (2021)
- Unlike Pluto & Why Mona - Rewind (2021)
- Unlike Pluto & Joanna Jones & Palaye Royale - Dead To Me (Reimagined)(2024)
- Unlike Pluto & Why Mona - Figueroa (DEMO) (2024)

=== Remixes ===
- Tritonal - Anchor (2014)
- Diplo – Revolution (featuring Faustix & Imanos and Kai) (2014)
- Mike Stud - Closer (2015)
- Adam Lambert - Ghost Town (2015)
- Jason Derulo - Want To Want Me (2016)
- Diplo & Sleepy Tom - Be Right There (2016)
- Twenty One Pilots - Stressed Out (2016)
- Lost Kings (featuring Katelyn Tarver) - You (2016)
- Steve Aoki - Back 2 U (featuring WALK THE MOON) (2016)
- Pegboard Nerds & NGHTMRE - Superstar (featuring Krewella) (2017)
- Unlike Pluto - More Than I Remember You (2023)
- Unlike Pluto - Smoke in my Heart (2023)
- Unlike Pluto - Lavender (2023)
- Why Mona - Quintana Roo (2023)
- Why Mona - forest green (2023)
- Unlike Pluto - It Goes Inside My Head (2024)

=== Why Mona Singles (Originals) ===
Title	Year
"Robbery"	2020
"Rabbit Hole"	2020
"Homecoming"	2020
"At the Top"	2020
"Terra Tears"	2020
"Wonder 'Bout You"	2020
"Time is Running Out"	2020
"Bethlehem Wonderland"	2020
"lemons"	2022
"30 purple birds"	2022
"stagNation"	2022
"Kiss Me"	2023
"forest green"	2023
"Dollhouse"	2023
"beauty queen"	2024
"Promise Me"	2024
"Red Rover"	2024

=== Why Mona Singles (Covers) ===
Title	Year
"We Will Rock You"	2017
"Happy Together"	2017
"Time Is Running Out"	2018
"September"	2018
"Stayin' Alive"	2018
"Go Your Own Way"	2018
"Wannabe"	2019
"Oops!...I Did It Again (with Unlike Pluto)"	2019
"Umbrella"	2020
"Running Up That Hill (Deal With God)"	2022
"Have Yourself A Merry Little Christmas"	2024

=== Like Saturn Singles ===
Title	Year	Album
"All Alone"	2020	Alpharetta (EP)
"My Life"	2020	Alpharetta (EP)
"I Don't Mind"	2020	Alpharetta (EP)
"I Wish I Could Say"	2020	Alpharetta (EP)
"Cherry Rain"	2020	Something Beautiful
"2091"	2020	Something Beautiful
"I Know I Know"	2020	Something Beautiful
"Something Beautiful"	2020	Something Beautiful
"So Worthless"	2020	Something Beautiful
"Hope"	2020	Something Beautiful
"Levitation Spell"	2020	Something Beautiful
"Stemmed Out"	2020	Something Beautiful
"Sandy Future"	2020	Something Beautiful
"Munky Funk"	2020	Something Beautiful
"Love You Anyway"	2020	Something Beautiful
"You Were Gone"	2020	Something Beautiful
"Leftovers"	2020	Something Beautiful
"Floating in Time"	2020	Something Beautiful
"Not a Grunge Song"	2020	Something Beautiful
"Dojo Club"	2020	Something Beautiful
"Fairy Catching"	2020	endless reveries
"Crystallized Air"	2020	endless reveries
"Mirai"	2020	endless reveries
"Tranquilized Summer"	2020	endless reveries
"Blue Haze"	2020	endless reveries
"Shrine"	2020	endless reveries
"In The Clouds"	2020	endless reveries
"Midnight Sailing"	2020	endless reveries
"Forgiveness"	2020	endless reveries
"Otherworldly"	2020	endless reveries
"Baklava"	2020	endless reveries
"Avoiding Burdens"	2020	endless reveries
"Blissful Seclusion"	2020	endless reveries
"No Man's Land"	2020	endless reveries
"Beautiful Ruins"	2020	endless reveries
"Memories Put To Rest"	2020	endless reveries
"Dreamy Dimensions"	2020	endless reveries
"Hollowed Out"	2020	endless reveries
"Pink breeze"	2020	endless reveries
"Forgetting Myself"	2020	endless reveries
"Motion Sickness"	2020	endless reveries
"Stone Cold"	2020	endless reveries
"awake at night"	2020	endless reveries
"chikurin"	2020	endless reveries
"Cold Blooded"	2020	endless reveries
"floating in an endless void"	2020	endless reveries
"Tunnel Vision"	2021	endless reveries
"set adrift"	2021	endless reveries
"fading to grey"	2021	endless reveries
"edge of reality"	2021	endless reveries
"cuddled up"	2021	endless reveries
"lost happiness"	2021	endless reveries
"vanished years"	2021	endless reveries
"free roaming"	2021	endless reveries
"missing summer"	2021	endless reveries
"reminiscing"	2021	endless reveries
"distant galaxies"	2021	seldom happiness
"purple city"	2021	seldom happiness
"weary oasis"	2021	seldom happiness
"stranded nowhere"	2021	seldom happiness
"i think i'll be alright"	2021	seldom happiness
"neverending road"	2021	seldom happiness
"what a view"	2021	seldom happiness
"mirror with no reflection"	2021	seldom happiness
"melancholy abyss"	2021	seldom happiness
"after hours"	2021	seldom happiness
"thin atmosphere"	2021	seldom happiness
"fog season"	2021	seldom happiness
"let's go far away"	2021	seldom happiness
"away from the storm"	2021	seldom happiness
"lucid unknowns"	2021	seldom happiness
"familiar dream"	2021	seldom happiness
"forsaken truth"	2021	seldom happiness
"abandoned"	2021	seldom happiness
"unseen lights"	2021	seldom happiness
"unfinished"	2021	seldom happiness
"turns to ash"	2021	seldom happiness
"coping"	2021	seldom happiness
"hard to reach"	2021	seldom happiness
"dark lullaby"	2021	seldom happiness
"middle of nowhere"	2021	seldom happiness
"coming to an end"	2021	seldom happiness
"aesthetic"	2021	seldom happiness
"warped"	2021	seldom happiness
"descending"	2021	seldom happiness
"cold embers"	2021	seldom happiness
"no pixels"	2021	seldom happiness
"time and time again"	2021	seldom happiness
"missing colors"	2021	seldom happiness
"getting colder"	2021	seldom happiness
"i wonder"	2021	Non-Album Singles
"lost in the sand"	2021	Non-Album Singles
"flowing whisper"	2021	Non-Album Singles
"i feel so lost at night"	2021	Non-Album Singles
"snow mushrooms"	2021	Non-Album Singles
"when darkness fades"	2021	Non-Album Singles
"sleepless nights"	2022	Non-Album Singles
"summer memories"	2022	Non-Album Singles
"unearth"	2022	Non-Album Singles
"serene memoir"	2022	Non-Album Singles
"undiscovered city	2022	Non-Album Singles
"escape to anywhere"	2022	Non-Album Singles
"constant waves"	2022	Non-Album Singles
"up and away"	2022	Non-Album Singles
"past the storm"	2022	Non-Album Singles
"missing my mind"	2022	Non-Album Singles
"illusive past"	2022	fairy sonata
"strong absence"	2022	fairy sonata
"whispering motions"	2022	fairy sonata
"conundrum"	2022	fairy sonata
"overnight trip"	2022	fairy sonata
"bitter nights"	2022	fairy sonata
"falling debris"	2022	fairy sonata
"faint glimmer"	2022	fairy sonata
"time for a reset"	2022	fairy sonata
"calm before the storm"	2022	fairy sonata
"solemn sky"	2022	fairy sonata
"out of the way"	2022	fairy sonata
"foggy mind"	2022	fairy sonata
"i feel like someone else"	2022	fairy sonata
"maybe it's all over"	2022	fairy sonata
"gloom garden"	2022	fairy sonata
"losing my head"	2022	fairy sonata
"stardust"	2022	fairy sonata
"beyond the horizon"	2022	fairy sonata
"dropped temperature"	2022	fairy sonata
"down we fall"	2022	fairy sonata
"weird times"	2022	fairy sonata
"boundless sorrow"	2022	fairy sonata
"harmony"	2022	fairy sonata
"hollow"	2022	fairy sonata
"radiant"	2022	fairy sonata
"doom and gloom"	2022	fairy sonata
"hana fields"	2022	fairy sonata
"celestial fall"	2022	fairy sonata
"neverness"	2022	fairy sonata
"new ruins"	2022	nighttime nostalgia
"halcyon"	2022	nighttime nostalgia
"dropoff"	2022	nighttime nostalgia
"yama"	2022	nighttime nostalgia
"silent peaks"	2023	nighttime nostalgia
"where i should be"	2023	nighttime nostalgia
"chaos color"	2023	nighttime nostalgia
"further than i thought"	2023	nighttime nostalgia
"as it rains"	2023	nighttime nostalgia
"desert rain"	2023	nighttime nostalgia
"mountain wind"	2023	nighttime nostalgia
"before i say goodbye"	2023	nighttime nostalgia
"old flowers"	2023	nighttime nostalgia
"don't you cry"	2023	nighttime nostalgia
"wasn't trying to love you"	2023	nighttime nostalgia
"hush"	2023	nighttime nostalgia
"silent tears"	2023	nighttime nostalgia
"nori beam"	2023	nighttime nostalgia
"still forgotten"	2023	nighttime nostalgia
"echoes and whispers"	2023	nighttime nostalgia
"hidden fortunes"	2023	nighttime nostalgia
"crashbloom"	2023	nighttime nostalgia
"nowhere alone"	2023	nighttime nostalgia
"i keep forgetting"	2023	nighttime nostalgia
"backfired"	2023	nighttime nostalgia
"once was"	2023	nighttime nostalgia
"always weird"	2023	nighttime nostalgia
"sand drifting"	2023	nighttime nostalgia
"summer silence"	2023	nighttime nostalgia
"floating where i want"	2023	nighttime nostalgia
"celestial secrets"	2023	nighttime nostalgia
"firebreath"	2023	nighttime nostalgia
"nightly"	2023	nighttime nostalgia
"faeries garden"	2023	nighttime nostalgia
"wastingmytime"	2023	nighttime nostalgia
"love blur"	2023	Non-Album Singles
"night fade"	2023	Non-Album Singles
"exhausted"	2023	Non-Album Singles
"lately"	2023	Non-Album Singles
"shadow dark"	2023	Non-Album Singles
"sing for me"	2023	Non-Album Singles
"monday apocalypse"	2023	Non-Album Singles
"don't you love me too"	2023	Non-Album Singles
"like i'm done"	2023	Non-Album Singles
"i never know anything"	2023	Non-Album Singles
"stuck in twilight"	2023	Non-Album Singles
"through the valley"	2023	Non-Album Singles
"white lies"	2024	i wonder when (EP)
"empty promises"	2024	i wonder when (EP)
"thinking it through"	2024	i wonder when (EP)
"no cure"	2024	melancholy fantasies
"i think i'll be alright"	2024	melancholy fantasies
"stranded"	2024	melancholy fantasies
"dawned on me"	2024	melancholy fantasies
"never enough"	2024	melancholy fantasies
"worth my time"	2024	melancholy fantasies
"hello karma"	2024	melancholy fantasies
"same same"	2024	melancholy fantasies
"i don't want to do anything"	2024	melancholy fantasies
"sometimes it's everything"	2024	melancholy fantasies
"relapse"	2024	melancholy fantasies
"broken, shattered"	2024	melancholy fantasies
"i wanted to try"	2024	melancholy fantasies
"new horizons"	2024	melancholy fantasies
"days cloudy"	2024	melancholy fantasies
"remember that one time"	2024	melancholy fantasies
"the end of us"	2024	melancholy fantasies
"alone always"	2024	melancholy fantasies
"sometimes i cry"	2024	melancholy fantasies
"at night"	2024	melancholy fantasies
"fire oasis"	2024	melancholy fantasies
"through tokyo"	2024	melancholy fantasies
