= Illuminations (Erik Friedlander album) =

Studio album by Erik Friedlander
- Released: April 21, 2015
- Recorded: April 14, 2014
- Studio: Let 'Em In Studios, Brooklyn, NY
- Genre: Avant-garde, jazz, Americana, contemporary classical music
- Label: Skipstone; SSR020
- Producer: Erik Friedlander

Erik Friedlander chronology
Nighthawks (2014)	Illuminations (2015)	Oscalypso (2015)

Illuminations is a solo album by cellist Erik Friedlander which was released in 2015 on the Skipstone label. The music was commissioned by the Jewish Museum in New York City to commemorate an exhibit of ancient Arabic, Latin and Hebrew books from Oxford University's Bodleian Collection.

== Reception ==
Writing for All About Jazz, Enrico Bettinello said "this little gem, in its apparent simplicity, has the merit of going to the heart of sound and the gesture itself. Very exciting".

== Track listing ==
All compositions by Erik Friedlander.

1. "Invocation - Seshat" - 2:40
2. "Prelude - Scriptorium" - 6:16
3. "Madrigal - Siddur" - 4:40
4. "Chant - Illuminations" - 3:51
5. "Cham - Hypnotique" - 3:08
6. "Tarantella - The Serpent" - 4:49
7. "Fantasia - Zodiac" - 3:46
8. "Chant - Kaddish" - 4:20
9. "Madrigal - The Virgin & The Unicorn" - 4:07
10. "Pavan - Hildegard" - 4:35

== Personnel ==
- Erik Friedlander – cello
