= Team Illuminate =

Team Illuminate may refer to:

- Team Illuminate (men's team), a professional cycling team that competes on the UCI Continental Tours
- Team Illuminate (women's team), a professional cycling team that competes on the UCI Women's World Tour
