= Illuminata (band) =

Austrian musical group

- Origin: Graz, Styria, Austria
- Genres: Symphonic metal
- Years active: 2006–present
- Labels: Twilight Zone Records, Napalm Records
- Members: Katarzyna Nieniewska; Sabrina Supan; Thomas Kern; Lukas Knoebl; Christoph Vide
- Past members: Dave Slut; Joanna Nieniewska; Lisa Tomantschger
- Website: illuminata.at

Illuminata is an Austrian symphonic metal band from Graz.

== History ==
The band was founded in 2006 by guitarist Lukas Knoebl and drummer Dave Slut (ex-Everlasting Dawn). They were joined by vocalist and flutist Katarzyna Nieniewska in March 2007. At the same year Christoph and Joanna joined. After some time the band released their first EP Lachrymal. It was followed by full-length album From the Chalice of Dreams, which came out in January 2008. Soon after the record was released, Joanna left the band for personal reasons and was replaced by Austrian soprano singer Lisa Tomantschger.

In summer 2009, the band released their second EP A Frame Of Beauty. After several concerts in Europe, Lisa and Dave left the band, and were replaced by the previous singer Joanna and Thomas Kern (Darkfall) respectively.

The band's second album A World So Cold was released on 25 November 2011 via Napalm Records. The band performed at the stage on Metalchamp Festival in Slovenia, supporting Xandria, Visions of Atlantis and Serenity.

In late June 2014, four years after the release of A World So Cold, the band started an Indiegogo campaign to raise funds for their new album. The campaign successfully ended on 28 August 2014. The new album called Where Stories Unfold was mixed and mastered by Jan Vacik at Dreamsound Studios in Munich and released on 23 January 2015. It features 60-piece Czech Film Orchestra, choirs and variety of guest musicians. According to the band, "the album is heavily influenced by recent ‘larger than life’ blockbusters movies and combines two of the most powerful genres, Heavy Metal and Film Music." An instrumental version of the album has been released as well.

== Band members ==
Current line-up

- Katarzyna Nieniewska – flute, vocals (2007–present)
- Sabrina Supan – keyboards, backing vocals (2007–present)
- Thomas Kern – drums (2010–present)
- Lukas Knoebl – guitars (2006–present)
- Christoph Vide – bass, acoustic guitars (2007–present)

Former members

- Dave Slut – drums, vocals (2006–2010)
- Joanna Nieniewska – vocals (2007–2008, 2011–2012)
- Lisa Tomantschger – vocals (2008–2010)

== Discography ==
Studio albums

- From the Chalice of Dreams (2008)
- A World So Cold (2011)
- Where Stories Unfold (2015)

Singles

- "Icechild" (2009)
- "A Frame of Beauty" (2009)
- "Cold Hands Warm Hearts" (2011)
- "Phoenix" (2015)

EP's

- Lachrymal (Demo) (2008)
- A Frame of Beauty (2009)
