= Illumination =

Illumination may refer to:

== Science and technology ==
- Illumination, an observable property and effect of light
- Illumination (lighting), the use of light sources
- Global illumination, algorithms used in 3D computer graphics

== Spirituality and religion ==
- Divine illumination, the process of human thought needs to be aided by divine grace
- Divine light, an aspect of divine presence
- Illuminationism, philosophical doctrine according to which the process of human thought needs to be aided by divine grace

== Arts and media ==
- Illuminated manuscript, the artistic decoration of hand-written texts
- Illumination, British title of the 1896 novel The Damnation of Theron Ware by Harold Frederic
- Illumination (decoration), a popular Moravian decoration used throughout Advent and Christmastide
- Illumination (image), the use of light and shadow in art
- Illuminations (poetry collection), by French poet Arthur Rimbaud
- Illuminations (short story collection), a 2022 collection of short stories written by Alan Moore

=== Music ===
==== Albums ====
- Illumination!, 1964 album by the Elvin Jones/Jimmy Garrison Sextet
- Illumination (Walter Davis, Jr. album), 1977 album by American jazz pianist Walter Davis, Jr.
- Illumination (The Pastels album), 1997 album by the Scottish band The Pastels
- Illumination (Paul Weller album), 2002 album by English singer Paul Weller
- Illumination (Earth, Wind & Fire album), 2005 album by American R&B group Earth, Wind & Fire
- Illumination (Tristania album), 2007 album by Norwegian gothic metal band Tristania
- Illumination (Miami Horror album), 2010 album by Australian group Miami Horror
- Illumination, a 2007 album by Robert Rich
- Illumination, a 2012 album by Jennifer Thomas

==== Songs ====
- "Illumination", by Gogol Bordello from their 2005 album Gypsy Punks: Underdog World Strike
- "Illumination", by Lindsey Buckingham from his 2011 album Seeds We Sow
- Les Illuminations (Britten), a song cycle setting poems of Arthur Rimbaud
- "Illumination", by Heaven 17

== Other uses ==
- Illumination (company), an American film and animation studio

== See also ==
- Illuminations (disambiguation)
