= TEDxMcGill =

Annual event at McGill University, Montreal, Canada

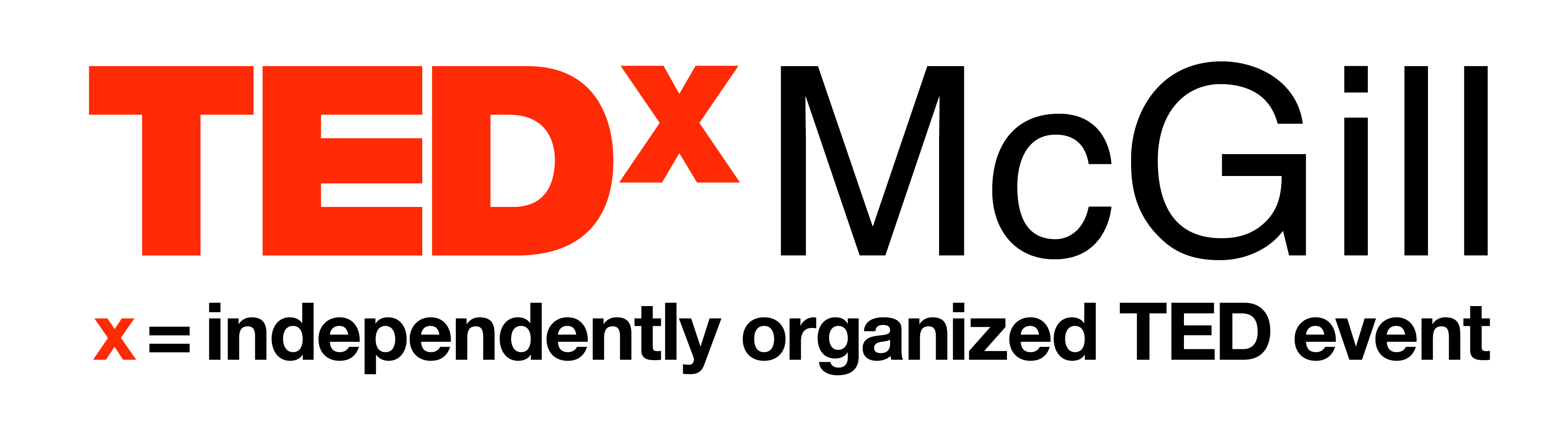

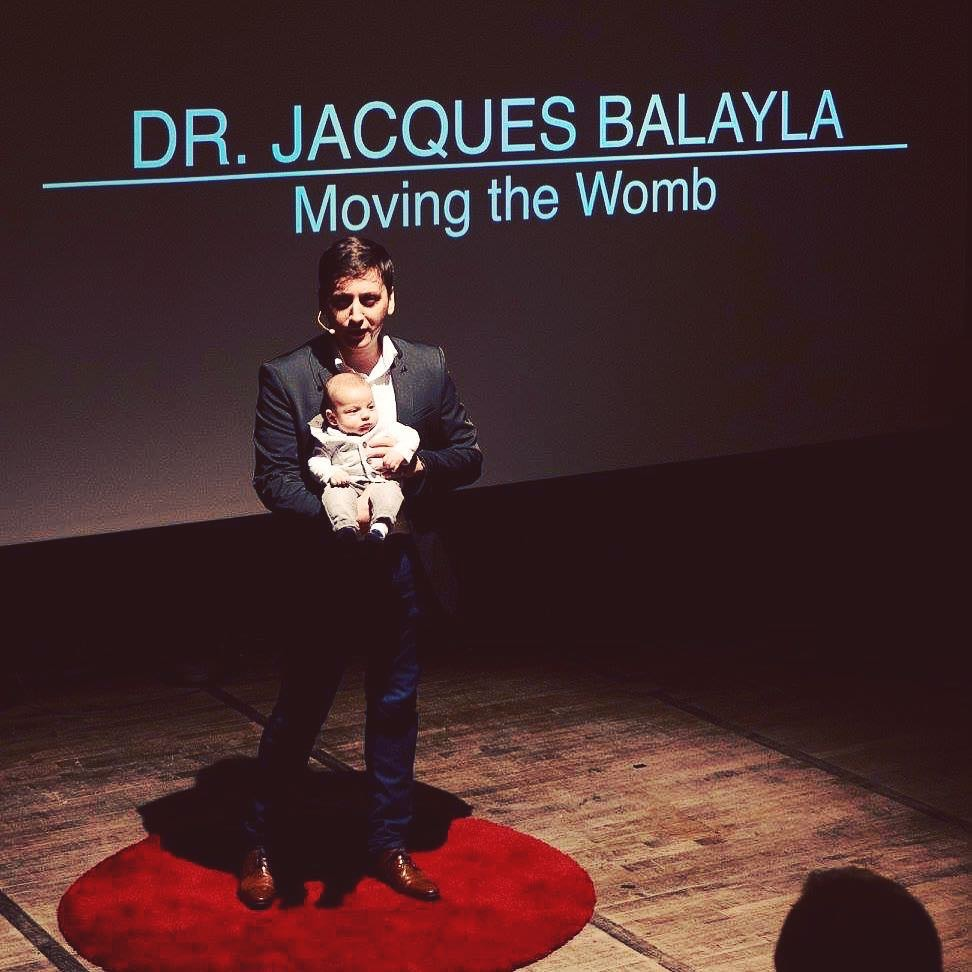
- Dr. Jacques Balayla speaking at TEDxMcGill 2017 under the theme of "Giving Voice"
- Status: Active
- Genre: General conference
- Venue: McCord Museum
- Location: Montreal
- Country: Canada
- Attendance: 100
- Organizer: Student volunteers
- Filing status: Non-profit
- Website: http://www.tedxmcgill.org

TEDxMcGill (stylized as TED^{x}McGill) is an independently organised single-day TED conference in Montreal started in 2009 by students from McGill University, after which the event is named.

== History ==
The event was initiated by five students from the McGill University in 2009. Since then, TEDxMcGill has hosted annual conferences. The inaugural conference gathered 16 speakers from different backgrounds (students, professors, analysts, musicians, and Andy Nulman, the co-founder of the Just for Laughs Comedy Festival) to initiate discussions on the theme of "Talks for Tomorrow". Fifteen speakers and more than 600 people, including the McGill student body but also Montreal at large, met during the second conference themed "Relentless Curiosity" in 2010. The 2011 event was held on November 13 at Bain Mathieu. under the theme of Redefining Reality. The 2016 conference was held on March 19, 2016, following the theme Paradigm Shift. This was followed by the 2017 TEDxMcGill conference held at the McCord Museum in Montreal on November 11, 2017, under the theme of Giving Voice.The 2018 TEDxMcGill was also organised at the McCord Museum on November 24, 2018, with the theme of "Climbing Ladders". The 2019 "Pushing the Envelope" TEDxMcGill event was also held at the McCord Museum on November 16, 2019. In response to COVID-19 restrictions, the 2021 event adeptly transitioned into a virtual format, exploring the theme "Embracing the Unknown" on January 31. The subsequent year marked a return to in-person gatherings, as TEDxMcGill convened at l'Astral on November 13, 2021, under the theme "Illuminate".

The 2023 TEDxMcGill event was held at the Corona Theatre on Sunday, January 22, 2023. This edition's theme, 'Pale Blue Dot,' was based on a famous photograph in 1990 describing the Earth as a 'Pale Blue Dot', sailing through the vast cosmos. This metaphorical theme can have different meanings for different people. Whether it’s leaving your mark, reframing the narrative, gaining perspective, zooming in or zooming out, the theme invited speakers and the audience to explore myriad interpretations and spark transformative discussions on the way they see life.

TEDxMcGill held its eleventh conference on February 4th, 2024, under the theme 'Kaleidoscope.' This theme represents a celebration of diversity, innovation, and the ever-evolving panorama of human creativity. Like a kaleidoscope, which creates intricate patterns by reflecting and refracting light through various mirrors, shapes, and colors, TEDxMcGill serves as a platform where a diverse array of perspectives, disciplines, and backgrounds converge. Through the theme 'Kaleidoscope,' TEDxMcGill aims to bring together a wide range of human thoughts and experiences. By turning the kaleidoscope of ideas, attendees will have the opportunity to uncover new patterns of thought and discover bright, colorful perspectives.
