= Illuminations (short story collection) =

2022 short story collection by Alan Moore

Illuminations: Stories
- Author: Alan Moore
- Subject: Short story collection
- Publisher: Bloomsbury
- Publication date: October 11, 2022
- Pages: 464
- ISBN: 9781635578805

Illuminations: Stories is a 2022 short story collection by Alan Moore.

== Contents ==
- "Hypothetical Lizard"
- "Not Even Legend"
- "Location, Location, Location"
- "Cold Reading"
- "The Improbably Complex High-Energy State"
- "Illuminations"
- "What We Can Know About Thunderman"
- "American Light: An Appreciation"
- "And, at the Last, Just to Be Done with Silence"
