= Illuminatus of Arce =

Early follower of Francis of Assisi

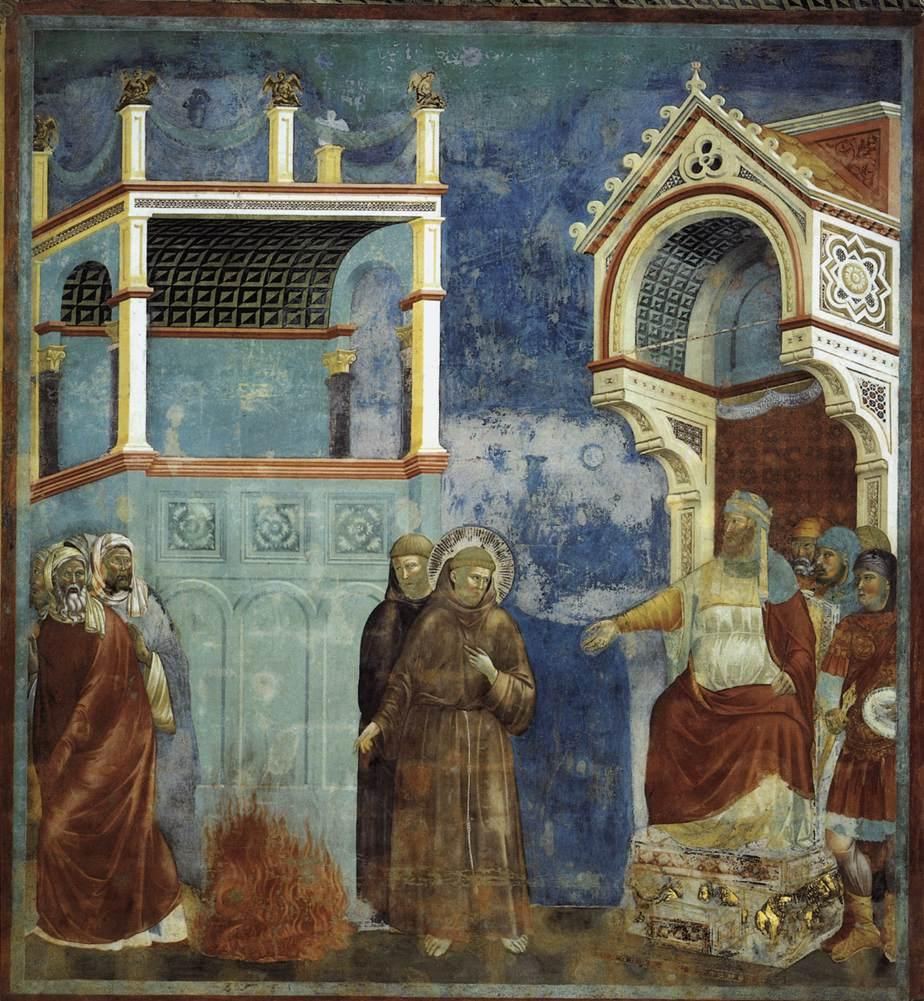
Francis and Illuminatus before the sultan. Fresco by Giotto.

Illuminatus of Arce (Italian: Illuminato dell'Arce) or Illuminatus of Rieti (Illuminato da Rieti) was an earlier follower of Francis of Assisi.

Illuminatus was born around 1190, probably in Rocca Antica or Rocca Sinibalda, villages southwest of Rieti, or possibly in the region of Arce in the plain around Assisi. In 1219, during the Fifth Crusade, he accompanied Francis on his mission to the court of al-Kāmil, sultan of Egypt. In 1224, he was the first to spot the stigmata on Francis at La Verna. He convinced Francis to publicize the miracle. He was living at Greccio in 1246. He is reported to have died either in 1260–1262 or in 1266.

While earlier sources confirm that Francis had a companion in 1219, Bonaventure, in his Legenda maior (c. 1260), is the first to name him: "a brother named Illuminatus, a virtuous and enlightened man" (Illuminato nomine, viro utique luminis et virtutis). It has been speculated that Illuminatus was one of Bonaventure's informants. A letter appended to the Legenda trium sociorum names Illuminatus as a source. Although this Legenda was written in the 1240s, the earliest manuscript dates to 1311 and the letter may be a later addition, perhaps influenced by Bonaventure. It has even been suggested that Bonaventure invented the name Illuminatus ('enlightened one') because he did not know the companion's actual name. There is, however, a 14th-century compilation of Franciscan exempla that includes one attributed to Illuminatus.

In the Divine Comedy of Dante Alighieri, Illuminatus is pictured in the Heaven of the Sun, among the teachers and mystics of the second garland of souls (Paradiso 12.130).

Illuminatus of Arce is sometimes confused with Bishop Illuminatus of Assisi.

== Bibliography ==
- Di Fonzo, Lorenzo (1971). "Illuminato da Rieti". Enciclopedia Dantesca. Vol. 3. Istituto dell'Enciclopedia Italiana. p. 364.
- Flores d'Arcais, Francesca (2001). Giotto. Actes Sud.
- Oliger, Livarius, ed. (1927). "Liber exemplorum fratrum minorum saeculi XIII". Antonianum. 2: 204–276.
- Morrison, Molly (2010) [2000]. "Illuminato da Rieti". In Richard Lansing (ed.). The Dante Encyclopedia. Routledge. p. 498.
- Tolan, John (2009). Saint Francis and the Sultan: The Curious history of a Christian–Muslim Encounter. Oxford University Press.
