= Illuminato da Chieti =

Italian Franciscan friar and bishop

Illuminato da Chieti (Latin: Illuminatus de Theate; c. 1200 ? – 1280×1282) was a Franciscan friar who served as the bishop of Assisi from 1274 until his death.

Illuminato was born at Chieti in the early thirteenth century. Some sources placing his birth around 1200, but this would make him an unusually old man when first elected bishop. He has sometimes been misidentified with Illuminato da Rieti, the companion of Francis of Assisi, but the two were certainly not the same. Likewise, he is not the same person as the Illuminato who, born blind and cured by Francis, entered the Franciscan order in gratitude, as told by Thomas of Celano, who makes clear that this person was certainly already dead by 1254. Nor is he to be identified with a certain Friar Alluminato, born Accarino della Rocca, who had an adult son named Enrico in October 1238.

It is unknown when Illuminato entered the Franciscan order. According to Salimbene de Adam, he worked in the convent of Assis for the minister general, Elias of Cortona, in 1238, taking dictation and transcribing letters. He met Salimbene in 1241–43 when he moved to the convent of Siena. By 1267, he had been elected minister provincial of Assisi. Following the death of Bishop Niccolò da Calvi in 1273, the chapter of the cathedral of Assisi elected Illuminato to succeed him per viam compromissi, i.e., by delegating the election to a committee of canons. The approval of this unusual procedure was held up by the lengthy inquiry of Cardinal Giovanni Gaetano Orsini, but was finally confirmed by Pope Gregory X on 23 July 1274.

Illuminato may have gone to the Second Council of Lyon to receive his confirmation. He was consecrated by Mark, the Franciscan bishop of Cassano. The little that is known of his pontificate concerns the regulation of construction in Assisi. His last known act is dated 20 June 1280. He was dead by 23 March 1282, when Pope Martin IV confirmed his successor, Simone Offreduzzi, also a Franciscan.

== Bibliography ==
- D'Acunto, Nicolangelo (2004). "Illuminato da Chieti". Dizionario Biografico degli Italiani, Volume 62: Iacobiti–Labriola (in Italian). Rome: Istituto dell'Enciclopedia Italiana. ISBN 978-8-81200032-6.
- Di Fonzo, Lorenzo (1971). "Illuminato da Rieti". Enciclopedia Dantesca. Vol. 3. Istituto dell'Enciclopedia Italiana. p. 364.
- Morrison, Molly (2010) [2000]. "Illuminato da Rieti". In Richard Lansing (ed.). The Dante Encyclopedia. Routledge. p. 498.
