= List of entertainment events at The Van Buren =

The Van Buren in Phoenix, Arizona has played host to many local, regional and international artists, spanning a wide range of musical genres.

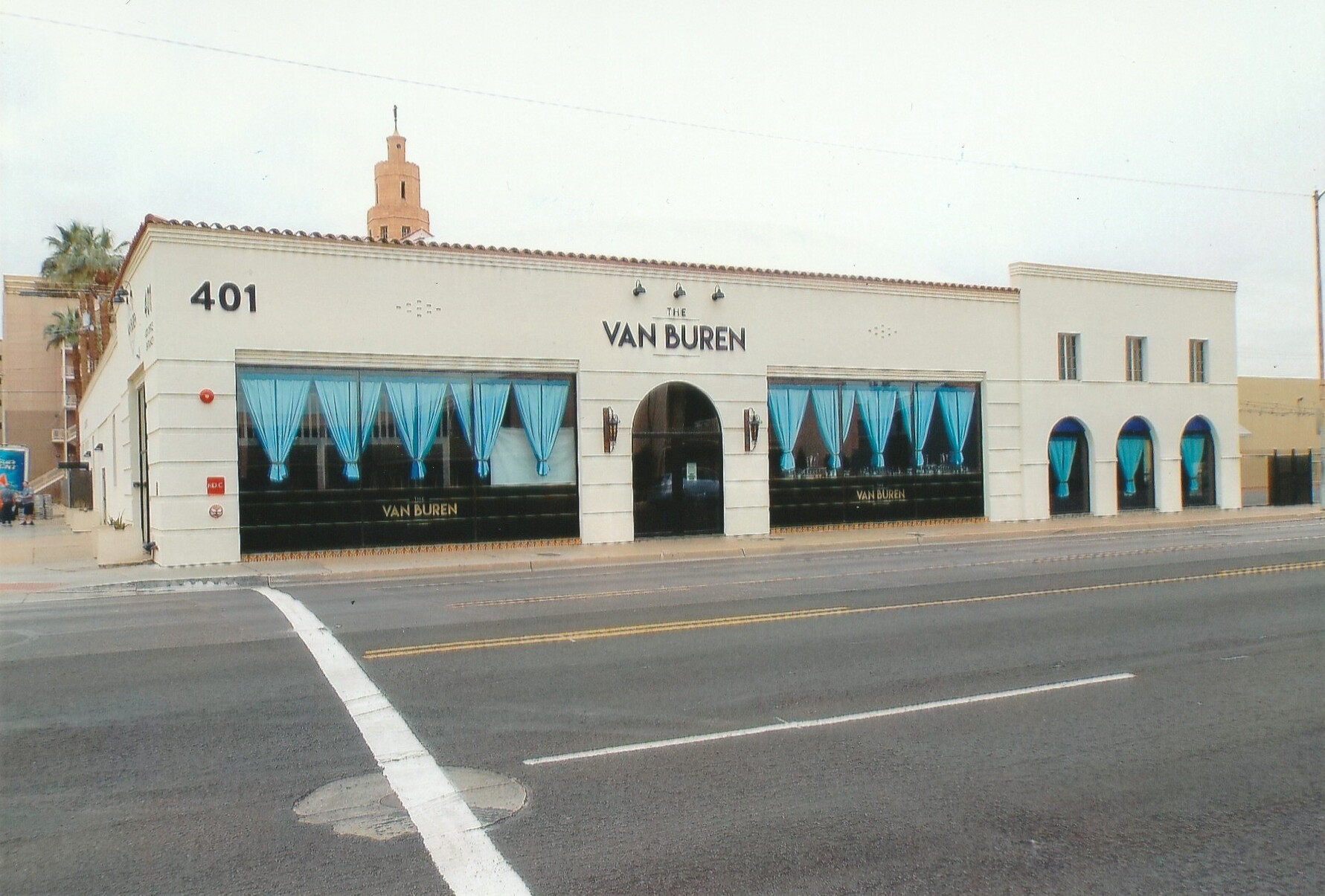
The Van Buren in 2017.

== 2010s ==
=== 2017 ===
Date	Artists/Show	Ref
August 23	Joywave and Cold War Kids	
August 26	Lord Huron	
August 27	Sylvan Esso	
September 1	The Growlers	
September 7	Lifehouse and Switchfoot	
September 8	Death Cab for Cutie	
September 17	Against Me!	
September 19	Jason Isbell & the 400 Unit	
September 23	Jared & the Mill	
September 28	Krewella	
September 29	MisterWives	
September 30	Ghastly	
October 3	Bonobo	
October 12	Portugal. The Man	
October 17	Dinosaur Jr.	
October 24	Azealia Banks	
October 29	Iron & Wine	
November 2	LANY	
November 4	Chicano Batman	
November 9	Chase Rice	
November 11	Hard Working Americans	
November 12	The Front Bottoms	
November 15	Ani DiFranco	
November 16	Liam Gallagher	
November 17	Iration	
November 18	Belanova	
November 22	The Maine	
November 24	Steel Panther	
November 29	Live 101.5 Jingle Bash with Logic	
November 29	Live 101.5 Jingle Bash with Khalid	
December 1	Welcome to Night Vale	
December 6	Wheeler Walker Jr.	
December 13	The Drums	
December 14	Cody Jinks	
December 15	Natalia Jiménez	
December 23	Holiday Extravaganza with Jared & the Mill	
December 28	Trombone Shorty & Orleans Avenue	
December 31	New Years Eve Block Party	

=== 2018 ===
Date	Artists/Show	Ref
January 5	Holiday Hangover	
January 9	Milky Chance	
January 10	Marilyn Manson	
January 12	Zeppelin USA	
January 13	Too Short	
January 14	K.Flay	
January 26	St. Vincent	
January 27	Hippo Campus	
February 5	Judah & the Lion	
February 7	Walk the Moon	
February 8	Sabaton	
February 9	Dua Lipa	
February 10	Drive-By Truckers	
February 19	tUnE-yArDs	
February 20	Dan Auerbach	
February 21	Keys N Krates	
February 23	Jacob Sartorius	
February 24	Ron Pope	
February 25	Steve Hackett	
March 3	Pop Evil	
March 7	Brockhampton	
March 9	Lane 8	
March 14	A$AP Ferg	
March 16	Phoenix Afrobeat Ochestra	
March 23	Why Don't We	
March 30	Ladies 80's Dance Night	
March 31	Quinn XCII	
April 2	Orchestral Manoeuvres in the Dark	
April 6	Guilty Pleasures	
April 7	90s v 2000s Old School R&B and Hip Hop Dance	
April 11	What So Not	
April 14	Los Tres Tristes Tigres	
April 15	Chromeo	
April 16	In This Moment	
April 20	Cradle of Filth	
April 21	Bad and Boujee: A Dance Party	
April 27	Selena Night Phoenix: Club 90s	
April 28	Concrete Schoolyard: Alt Hip Hop Night	
May 5	Desert Daze Caravan	
May 17	Peter Hook & the Light	
May 18	Rumours: Fleetwood Mac Tribute	
May 19	Natalie Lafourcade	
May 20	Smokepurpp	
May 21	Godspeed You! Black Emperor	
May 22	Bleachers	
May 25	One More Time: Daft Punk Tribute	
May 27	Bad and Boujee: A Dance Party	
June 1	Calexico	
June 3	Mario Aguilar	
June 14	John Butler Trio	
June 15	Frank Turner	
June 17	Gary Clark Jr.	
June 20	Ziggy Marley	
June 21	Shakey Graves	
June 22	Trixie Mattel: Now With Moving Parts	
June 23	Who's Bad: Michael Jackson Tribute	
June 28	The Last Podcast on the Left	
June 29	Snow Tha Product	
June 30	Carlos Daniels	
July 3	The Mighty Mighty Bosstones	
July 6	tan/Iseult and Plastic Disease	
July 7	GrungeFest	
July 13	Karla Pérez as Selena	
July 14	Backstreet Boys vs. NSYNC: Club 90s	
July 17	Arizona Storytellers Project	
July 20	The International Mighty Mushroom	
July 21	Bad and Boujee: A Dance Party	
July 25	Belinda Carlisle	
July 27	Noise Pollution: AC/DC Tribute	
July 28	TrapFest	
August 4	Stateside Sweet 16 Birthday Bash	
August 10	Rihanna vs. Beyoncé: Tribute Dance Party	
August 11	Chuponcito	
August 13	Live 101.5’s Back 2 Bash	
August 14	Ski Mask The Slump God	
August 15	Nahko & Medicine for the People	
August 17	The Last Podcast on the Left	
August 18	Katastro	
August 24	Yuridia	
August 25	Tito's Chill Out — Tasting and Dance Party	
August 26	Yelawolf	
September 1	A $3 S**t Show	
September 2	Chris Lake	
September 5	Residente	
September 7	Selena Night: Club 90s	
September 8	Gin Blossoms	
September 9	Bishop Briggs	
September 12	Gov't Mule	
September 15	Slash	
September 21	Roller Disco Dance Party	
September 22	Kali Uchis	
September 27	The Glitch Mob	
September 28	Wyves	
September 29	Death Cab for Cutie	
September 30	Goo Goo Dolls	
October 2	Courtney Barnett	
October 3	Conor Oberst & the Mystic Valley Band	
October 6	Mat Kearney	
October 10	Sting and Shaggy	
October 12	EDEN	
October 13	Best of Phoenix A'fare	
October 14	Seven Lions	
October 19	FIDLAR	
October 20	Behemoth	
October 24	ZHU	
October 25	Bob Moses	
October 26	BØRNS	
October 27	Snails	
October 28	Amanda Miguel with Diego Verdaguer	
October 31	Jessie J	
November 1	The Beat ft. Ranking Roger	
November 2	Long Beach Dub All-Stars	
November 3	The Steeldrivers	
November 4	Petit Biscuit	
November 5	Go Vote (ft. Gin Blossoms, Calexico, Phoenix Afrobeat Orchestra, Mariachi Pasión)	
November 7	NF	
November 8	YBN Nahmir	
November 9	Atreyu	
November 14	Kyle	
November 16	Billie Eilish	
November 18	Circa Survive	
November 23	Good Charlotte	
November 25	Cat Power	
November 29	Jorja Smith	
November 30	Hoobastank/Old School – 90's Hip Hop Dance Party	
December 5	The Slackers	
December 7	A Tribute to: Deadmau5 v. Marshmallo	
December 8	6Lack	
December 14	Ookay	
December 15	Jared & The Mill's 4th Annual Holiday Extravaganza	
December 16	Little Steven & the Disciples of Soul	
December 17	A Drag Queen Christmas	
December 21	Glowed Up: a Hip-Hop Evolution	
December 22	Yule Ball	
December 28	On the Road to Decadance	
December 29	Roger Clyne and the Peacemakers	
December 31	Spafford	

=== 2019 ===
Date	Artists/Show	Ref
January 4	Selena Night: Club 90s	
January 5	Holiday Hangover: 80s Tribute Festival	
January 12	Zeppelin USA	
January 20	Dawes	
January 23	Andrew McMahon in the Wilderness	
January 25	Peter Murphy	
February 1	Omar Chaparro	
February 1	70s Dance Party	
February 2	Vince Staples	
February 7	Jesse McCartney	
February 8	Gasolina Night	
February 9	Drake Night	
February 13	Kacey Musgraves	
February 14	Neko Case	
February 16	The Cocktail Jam	
February 20	Cypress Hill	
February 21	Nothing More	
February 22	Noname	
February 24	Haters Roast	
February 27	The Interrupters	
February 28	Chippendales	
March 1	Neal Schon's Journey Through Time	
March 3	Lukas Graham	
March 6	LP	
March 8	Welcome to Night Vale	
March 9	Zomboy	
March 14	Graveyard	
March 19	Jamey Johnson	
March 21	Hippie Sabotage	
March 22	The International Mighty Mushroom	
March 23	Phyre Festival	
March 26	State Champs	
April 3	Dance Gavin Dance	
April 4	Switchfoot	
April 6	New Wave Night	
April 8	Ben Rector	
April 13	Railroad Earth	
April 19	Party Like a Queen: Disco Dance Party	
April 20	Party Up - Prince Tribute	
April 21	Falling in Reverse	
April 26	Whitey Morgan	
April 27	Architects	
April 30	Jon Anderson	
May 1	The Midnight	
May 3	GTA	
May 4	Classic Horror Film Series: Wolf Man	
May 4	Slander	
May 5	Roger Clyne and the Peacemakers	
May 7	Violent Femmes	
May 10	Slushii	
May 11	Avicii Tribute Night	
May 16	Mark Manson	
May 18	Club 90's: Selena Night	
May 22	Little Feat	
May 24	A Dance with Dragons	
May 25	One More Time - Daft Punk Tribute	
May 26	Rave of Thrones	
May 29	ARIZONA	
May 30	Jai Wolf	
May 31	Drake v Kanye: Tribute Dance Party	
June 1	Ilana Glazer	
June 3	The Specials	
June 5	Fonseca	
June 7	Fab Fridays with Aneesh	
June 8	Rich the Kid	
June 11	Aly & AJ	
June 14	Anberlin	
June 15	Alex Aiono	
June 29	Indigo Girls	
July 6	New Found Glory	
July 12	KMLE Country 90's Throwback	
July 13	Trapfest	
July 14	Club 90's: Backstreet Boys v. *NSYNC	
July 17	The Growlers	
July 18	Arizona Storytellers: Stories About Stories	
July 21	Common	
July 27	90's Hip Hop Dance Party	
August 1	The Drums	
August 2	Gasolina - Reggaeton Party	
August 3	The Cure v. The Smiths — Tribute Night	
August 9	Ana Barbara	
August 10	Kool 94.5 Presents: So Madonna	
August 16	Mario Aguilar	
August 17	Woodstock Tribute	
August 21	Grace VanderWaal	
August 23	Espectacular De Lucha Libre	
August 24–25	Van Beer'n Indoor Beer Fest	
August 30	Daniel Caesar	
August 31	Drake Night	
September 1	Classixx	
September 6	Greensky Bluegrass	
September 7	One Direction Night	
September 14	Paulina Rubio	
September 18	Flying Lotus	
September 20	Loud Luxury	
September 21	Tash Sultana	
September 27	Marianas Trench	
September 28	Lewis Capaldi	
September 29	Blue Oyster Cult	
October 5	Bad Religion	
October 9	The Band Camino	
October 10	Sabaton	
October 11	Bad Suns	
October 12	The Neighbourhood	
October 13	Tig Notaro	
October 16	Judah & the Lion	
October 17	Steve Hackett	
October 18	Dean Lewis	
October 19	Hobo Johnson & the Lovemakers	
October 23	Lizzo	
October 24	Highly Suspect	
October 25	Dreamers	
October 30	Lukas Graham	
October 31	Spafford	
November 1	Brockhampton	
November 3	Marilyn Manson	
November 7	Madeon	
November 8	Melanie Martinez	
November 9	Two Door Cinema Club	
November 10	Ice Nine Kills	
November 13	Jidenna	
November 14	Cold War Kids	
November 15	Club 90's: ABBA and 70's Party	
November 16	As I Lay Dying	
November 21	World of Dance Tour	
November 22	Ghostemane	
November 23	Snails	
November 27	One More Time - Daft Punk Tribute	
November 29	A$AP Ferg	
November 30	The Maine	
December 1	Plain White Ts with The Mowgli's and New Politics	
December 4	Gryffin	
December 8	Live 101.5's Jingle Bash with Logic and Jessie Reyez	
December 10	Rob Thomas	
December 11	Snoop Dogg	
December 13	Chon	
December 14	Thievery Corporation	
December 18	Ganja White Night	
December 19	HELLYEAH	
December 20	Yule Ball 2019	
December 21	Cashmere Cat	
December 21	Club 90's: Selena Night	
December 27	Injury Reserve	
December 28	Gasolina - Reggeaton Party	

== 2020s ==
=== 2020 ===
Date	Artists/Show	Ref
January 3	Holiday Hangover — 80's Tribute Festival	
January 4	90's Hip Hop Dance Party	
January 9	Rex Orange County	
January 14	Arizona Storytellers Project: New Beginnings and Fresh Starts	
January 16	Machine Head	
January 17	Zeppelin USA	
January 18	An Evening with the Celebrity Housewives	
January 19	Roddy Ricch	
January 25	Raphael Saadiq	
January 26	Saint Motel	
January 29	King Princess	
January 31	American Authors	
February 1	Hayley Kiyoko	
February 5	Chris Lane	
February 6	Armin Van Buuren	
February 7	Dashboard Confessional	
February 8	Black Tiger Sex Machine	
February 14	Dolla Dolla Dance Party	
February 22	Ekali	
February 28	Dance Yourself Clean	
March 5	Orville Peck	
March 13	Neon Rodeo — Country Dance Party	

On March 17, 2020, the City of Phoenix declared a state of emergency due to the spread of COVID-19 and the start of the pandemic. The Van Buren would be closed for 15 months, reopening on June 4, 2021.

=== 2021 ===
Date	Artists/Show	Ref
June 4	Phoenix Afrobeat Orchestra	
June 26	Kaytranada	
July 17	One More Time — Daft Punk Tribute	
July 24	Whitney Morgan	
July 30	Club 90's — Stranger Things Night	
July 31	Malaa	
August 7	Lane 8	
August 8	All Time Low with Grayscale and Sydney Sprague	
August 21	Mt. Joy	
August 22	Neko Case	
August 27	Olivia Rodrigo Dance Night	
September 3	Playboy Manbaby	
September 7	Gary Clark Jr.	
September 8	Surfaces	
September 10	Club 90's — Bad Bunny Night	
September 13	Dayglow	
September 15	CAAMP	
September 20	Cold War Kids	
September 27	Kat Von D	
September 28	Shakey Graves	
September 30	The Front Bottoms	
October 2	Poppy	
October 3	Mon Laferte	
October 3	Mon Laferte	
October 5	Avatar	
October 8	Ariana Grande Night	
October 9	Steve Hofstetter	
October 11	Bleachers	
October 13	LP	
October 14	Tinashe	
October 16	City Morgue	
October 17	Rod Wave	
October 18	Andy Mineo	
October 19	Alec Benjamin	
October 20	Dashboard Confessional	
October 22	Colter Wall	
October 24	Chicano Batman	
October 25	Lord Huron	
October 27	Dr. Dog	
October 28	Ministry	
October 29	Jeremy Zucker with Del Water Gap	
October 31	Mägo de Oz	
November 1	Julien Baker	
November 2	Jack Harlow	
November 3	Angels & Airwaves	
November 5	Club 90's: Doja Cat Night	
November 8	Role Model	
November 9	Queen Naija	
November 11	Boy Pablo	
November 12	Lukas Nelson	
November 17	COIN	
November 18	San Holo	
November 19	Beabadoobee	
November 20	MisterWives	
November 23	Thundercat	
November 24	The Midnight	
November 26	Hot Mulligan	
November 27	Roger Clyne and the Peacemakers	
November 29	TV Girl	
November 30	Andrew McManhon	
December 2	Blue October	
December 3	Waterparks	
December 4	Courtney Barnett	
December 5	La Oreja de Van Gogh	
December 11	Yung Gravy	
December 12	Marc Broussard	
December 13	Milky Chance	
December 17	Kip Moore	
December 18	Lovelytheband with Sir Sly	
December 29	Injury Reserve	

=== 2022 ===
Date	Artists/Show	Ref
January 11	Mother Mother	
January 14	Set It Off	
January 17	Washed Out	
January 18	I Dont Know How but They Found Me	
January 24	Eric Nam	
January 28	The Marias	
January 29	Bad Suns	
February 1	Falling in Reverse	
February 4	Club 90's: Mr. Worldwide Tribute Night	
February 10	Drive-By Truckers	
February 12	Amine	
February 14	Caribou	
February 17	Wale	
February 18	Mayday Parade	
February 27	Chris Renzema	
February 28	Mitski	
March 2	Manchester Orchestra	
March 3	Glass Animals	
March 4	Injury Reserve	
March 7	Grandson	
March 10	Marc E Bassy	
March 11	Hippie Sabotage	
March 14	Cannibal Corpse	
March 16	K.Flay	
March 17	Todrick Hall	
March 19	Yungblud	
March 20	Peach Pit	
March 21	Bob Moses	
March 22	The Airborne Toxic Event	
March 25	LSDREAM	
March 29	Hombres G	
April 7	Beartooth Silverstein	
April 10	Wallows	
April 11	Saba	
April 13	Hippo Campus	
April 14	Ashe	
April 15	Apocolyptica	
April 16	PUP	
April 17	Jacob Collier	
April 18	Conan Gray	
April 19	Orville Peck	
April 20	Girl Talk	
April 21	The HU	
April 24	Hot Chip	
April 30	Omar Apollo	
May 1	Car Seat Headrest	
May 4	EarthGang	
May 5	Snow Tha Product	
May 6	Welcome to Night Vale	
May 9	Kurt Vile	
May 12	St. Paul & the Broken Bones	
May 13	T-Pain	
May 14	Vic DiBitetto	
May 15	Carla Morrison	
May 18	LP	
May 19	Todd Snider	
May 21	Mat Kearney	
May 22	Giant Rooks	
May 25	Mxmtoon	
May 26	Durand Jones & The Indications	
May 27	Jaden Hossler	
June 4	Spoon	
June 5	Siddhartha	
June 7	Belle and Sebastian	
June 9	Alyssa Edwards	
June 15	Leon	
June 16	Nothing More	
June 18	Calexico	
June 19	Keshi	
June 24	Circle Jerks	
June 25	Bright Eyes	
July 1	Denzel Curry	
July 5	Motion City Soundtrack	
July 10	Big Gigantic	
July 13	Enanitos Verdes	
July 20	Purity Ring	
July 26	Anthrax	
July 28	Frank Turner	
July 29	Kaleo	
August 1	Jacksfilms	
August 2	Mt. Joy	
August 3	Simple Plan with Sum 41 and Magnolia Park	
August 4	STRFKR	
August 6	Father John Misty	
August 7	Yacht Rock Revue	
August 8	Teyana Taylor	
August 9	Matt Heckler	
August 12	Tim Heidecker	
August 14	CUCO	
August 15	Banks	
August 17	Shakey Graves	
August 19	OhGeesy	
August 23	Echo & the Bunnymen	
August 25	She Wants Revenge	
August 27	Joyce Manor	
August 29	Peter Hook & the Light	
August 30	Idles	
August 31	Jungle	
September 4	Hason	
September 9	Testament	
September 14	IDKhow with Joywave	
September 15	Wet Leg	
September 16	Bear Grillz	
September 17	Judah & the Lion	
September 19	Remi Wolf	
September 23	Andrew Bird	
September 24	Yung Bae	
September 25	Girl in Red	
September 27	The Knocks with Cannons	
September 28	Kolohe Kai	
September 30	Lake Street Dive	
October 1	Dylan Scott	
October 2	Metric	
October 3	Anees	
October 4	Clutch	
October 5	The Midnight	
October 6	Marcus King	
October 7	Marcus Mumford	
October 8	Pusha T	
October 9	Dayglow with Ritt Momney	
October 10	The War on Drugs	
October 11	Pi'erre Bourne	
October 12	Joyner Lucas	
October 14	Bonobo	
October 17	Death Cab for Cutie	
October 19	Muna	
October 22	Deorro	
October 23	Jessie Reyes	
October 24	Alex G	
October 25	Monolink	
October 28	I Prevail	
October 29	Blue October	
October 30	Foals	
October 31	King Princess with Em Beihold	
November 1	Surf Curse	
November 2	SG Lewis	
November 5	Ali Gatie	
November 7	Turnstile	
November 9	Trivium	
November 11	Beabadoobee	
November 12	Matt Maeson	
November 15	Cory Wong	
November 16	Rina Sawayama	
November 17	Two Feet	
November 18	Descendants	
November 19	Big Head Todd and the Monsters	
November 20	Trevor Hall	
November 26	Men I Trust	
November 27	State Champs	
December 1	Russell Dickerson	
December 3	Modest Mouse	
December 12	Charley Crockett	
December 14	Soccer Mommy	
December 20	Jinjer	

=== 2023 ===
Date	Artists/Show	Ref
January 17	Eden	
January 21	Destroy Lonely	
January 28	Ari Lennox	
February 1	Bush	
February 3	JID SMINO	
February 5	Danny Ocean	
February 22	The Black Jacket Symphony	
February 23	Joe Pera	
February 24	Kenia OS	
February 26	Emotional Oranges	
February 28	Betty Who	
March 2	Cuco	
March 4	Marauda	
March 8	Thee Sacred Souls	
March 9	DVSN	
March 10	SZA	
March 13	Our Last Night	
March 17	Atliens First Aid Kit	
March 20	Nav	
March 21	David Cross	
March 23	Kevin Kaarl	
March 24	A Flock of Seagulls	
March 26	Morgan Wade	
March 27	Harry Mack	
March 28	Weyes Blood	
April 2	Unknown Mortal Orchestra	
April 5	Bryce Vine	
April 6	Sunny Day Real Estate	
April 8	Joshua Bassett	
April 10	M83	
April 12	Babyface Ray	
April 15	Half Alive with Tessa Violet	
April 16	Key Glock	
April 17	Spiritbox	
April 18	Hippie Sabotage	
April 19	Big Wild	
April 22	Club 90's Bad Bunny Night	
April 23	VV (of HIM)	
April 26	Masego	
April 27	Sierra Ferrell	
April 28	Niko Moon	
May 1	City Morgue	
May 2	Tennis	
May 3	Crumb	
May 4	Hippo Campus	
May 5	Atreyu	
May 7	Avatar	
May 8	Pixies	
May 9	Lil Wayne	
May 10	Watsky	
May 11	Death Grips	
May 12	Future Islands	
May 13	Snow Tha Product	
May 15	$not	
May 16	100 Gecs	
May 17	First Aid Kit	
May 18	Hayley Kiyoko	
May 19	Molchat Doma	
May 22	Quinn XCII with ARIZONA	
May 24	Tove Lo	
May 28	Uncle Larry	
May 29	Anees	
May 31	Bebe Rexha	
June 1	Zebra	
June 4	Mike Campbell	
June 6	Bryson Tiller	
June 10	Waterparks	
June 23	Fuego	
June 24	Trevor Hall	
June 26	Tarja	
June 29	Grandson K.Flay	
July 1	Javier Rosas	
July 14	Goth Babe	
July 15	Les Claypool's Fearless Flying Frog Brigade	
July 16	The Drums	
July 22	Sister Sledge	
July 25	Jidenna	
July 27	Jesse & Joy	
July 31	Toosii	
August 1	Killer Mike	
August 4	Neal Brennan	
August 9	Jai Wolf	
August 25	Coco Jones	
August 27	Gregory Alan Isakov	
August 31	Electric Callboy	
September 3	Kamelot	
September 5	Kany Garcia	
September 8	Sylvan Esso	
September 9	City and Colour	
September 12	Jawbreaker	
September 14	Kolohe Kai	
September 15	Wolfmother	
September 16	Bruno Major	
September 17	Yacht Rock Revue	
September 18	Saint Motel	
September 19	Local Natives	
September 20	Prof	
September 21	Shakey Graves	
September 23	Jessie Murph	
September 27	The Aces	
September 28	Maisie Peters	
September 29	Victoria Monet	
September 30	Boys Like Girls with 3OH!3 and State Champs	
October 1	Behemoth	
October 3	BoyWithUke	
October 5	Gus Dapperton	
October 6	All Time Low with Gym Class Heroes andGrayscale	
October 7	Tate McRae	
October 8	Owl City	
October 9	Bishop Briggs and Misterwives	
October 10	Dean Lewis	
October 11	Tinlicker	
October 12	Dope Lemon	
October 13	6lack	
October 14	Apashe	
October 15	Amyl and the Sniffers	
October 16	The Brian Jonestown Massacre	
October 17	Teddy Swims	
October 18	VNV Nation	
October 19	Michelle Branch	
October 20	Zack Fox	
October 21	Armnhmr	
October 22	Eladio Carrión	
October 23	Jeremy Zucker	
October 24	Citizen	
October 25	The Garden	
October 26	The Hu	
October 27	Ashnikko	
October 30	Kota the Friend	
October 31	Beach Fossils	
November 1	Bullet for My Valentine	
November 3	Chappell Roan	
November 4	Phillip Phillips	
November 5	Fidlar	
November 8	Stephen Sanchez	
November 9	Vacations	
November 10	Faye Webster	
November 11	Blue October	
November 12	Rawayana	
November 13	Laufey	
November 15	Eric Nam	
November 16	The Japanese House	
November 17	Drake White	
November 18	Justin Quiles	
November 19	In Flames	
November 20	Aqua	
November 22	LP	
November 24	Sexxy Red	
November 25	Jeff Rosenstock	
November 26	Royal Blood	
November 28	Sun Room	
November 30	Lovett or Leave It	
December 1	Hot Mulligan	
December 2	Highly Suspect	
December 3	Akon	
December 7	Alexandra Kay	
December 8	Skid Row and Buckcherry	
December 9	Club 90's: Olivia Rodrigo Night	
December 15	TV Girl	
December 16	ARIZONA	

=== 2024 ===
Date	Artists/Show	Ref
January 8	The Charlatans	
January 11	Nimesh Patel	
January 19–20	The Maine with The Summer Set andWeathers	
January 22	Explosions in the Sky	
January 25	Isaiah Rashad	
February 1	Kaivon	
February 3	Pete Correale	
February 10	JP Saxe	
February 11	BabyTron	
February 13	Ricky Montgomery	
February 14–15	Ween	
February 16	Tornillo	
February 18	El Tri	
February 19	Ali Gatie	
February 20	Beartooth	
February 21	Brooks Nielsen	
February 22	Gareth Emery	
February 23	Extreme	
February 24	Alkaline Trio	
February 28	Dorian Electra	
March 1	Badfish	
March 2	Barely Alive	
March 5	Crosses	
March 8	Sasha Colby	
March 9	Grouplove	
March 10	Bas	
March 12	The Kills	
March 14	Enanitos Verdes	
March 15	Ashley McBryde	
March 16	Night Lovell	
March 17	Eyedress	
March 20	Busta Rhymes	
March 23	Alicia Villarreal	
March 24	Bryce Vine	
March 25	Chelsea Cutler	
March 28	Hippie Sabotage	
March 29	Banda World	
March 30	Fey	
April 1	Waterparks	
April 2	Daði Freyr	
April 3	Offset	
April 7	Willow Pill	
April 9	Aterciopelados	
April 11	Palace	
April 14	The Last Dinner Party	
April 16	Bayside	
April 18	Chris Renzema	
April 19	Our Last Night	
April 20	Chicano Batman	
April 22	Set It Off	
April 25	Connor Price	
April 26	Kai Wachi	
April 27	Inzo	
April 28	Slowdive	
May 1	Xavi	
May 5	Sematary	
May 11	Tribal Seeds	
May 13	Waxahatchee	
May 14	Panchiko	
May 15	Marcus King	
May 16	Alvvays	
May 18	The 502s	
May 19	Warpaint	
May 22	Mariah the Scientist	
May 24	DannyLux	
May 25	Microwave	
May 26	Sean Paul	
May 29	Taking Back Sunday	
May 31	Madison Beer	
June 1	Xavier Rudd	
June 4	The Teskey Brothers	
June 5	From Ashes to New	
June 6	Whitey Morgan and the 78's	
June 7	Allen Stone	
June 8	Aaron May	
June 11	The Boulet Brothers' Dragula	
June 12	Frank Turner	
June 13	Echo & the Bunnymen	
June 14	X Ambassadors	
June 19	PartyNextDoor	
June 21	Hobo Johnson	
June 23	Drive-by Truckers	
June 25	DIIV	
June 26	Say Anything	
June 27	You Should Know Podcast	
June 28	A.C.E.	
June 29	Eric André	
July 2	Iron & Wine	
July 9	Pvris	
July 13	The Band Camino	
July 16	Ken Carson	
July 17	Louie TheSinger	
July 19	Ghengar	
July 20	The Decemberists	
July 24	Chuu	
July 25	Jeezy	
July 26	Joe Pera	
July 30	Schoolboy Q	
July 31	Hermanos Gutierrez	
August 7	As I Lay Dying	
August 8	Strfkr	
August 9	La Santa Cecilia	
August 11	Caloncho	
August 12	Charley Crockett	
August 13	Vacations	
August 15	SiR	
August 16	Ski Mask the Slump God	
August 18	The Dead South	
August 22	Juvenile	
August 23	Me First and the Gimme Gimmes	
August 24	Lucky Daye	
August 29	ARTMS	
August 31	Thievery Corporation	
September 1	Hawthorne Heights	
September 5	Kikuo	
September 6	Novo Amor	
September 7	The Airborne Toxic Event	
September 9	Forrest Frank	
September 10	Colde	
September 11	Matisse	
September 13	La Santa Grifa	
September 15	Mariana's Trench	
September 16	Chromeo	
September 17	Peter Hook & the Light	
September 21	Future Islands	
September 22	David Cross	
September 24	Thee Sinseers and The Altons	
September 25	Tinlicker	
September 26	Lord of the Lost	
September 27	Montell Fish	
September 28	Snow Tha Product	
September 29	Wave to Earth	
September 30	Fontaines D.C.	
October 1	Peter Cat Recording Co.	
October 2	Glass Beams	
October 3	The Sisters of Mercy	
October 4	Citizen Soldier	
October 5	The National Parks	
October 6	Everglow	
October 7	Lorna Shore	
October 8	Lawrence	
October 9	The Fray	
October 10	Griff	
October 11	Hayden James	
October 12	Kany Garcia	
October 14	Hatebreed	
October 15	Valley	
October 16	Brooks Nielsen	
October 17	Jimmy Eat World	
October 19	Viva PHX	
October 20	Tinashe	
October 21	Suki Waterhouse	
October 22	Mägo de Oz	
October 23	Briston Maroney	
October 24	Testament	
October 25	SlenderBodies	
October 26	Bowling for Soup	
October 27	Wale	
October 28	G-Easy	
October 29	Opeth	
October 30	Tycho	
October 31	Inhaler	
November 2	Ginger Root	
November 3	Duster	
November 4	Tori Kelly	
November 5	Girlschool	
November 7	Jesse McCartney	
November 9	Mod Sun and Lovelytheband	
November 11	State Champs Knuckle Puck, Meet Me at the Altar, Daisy Grenade	
November 14	Mat Kearney	
November 15	Highly Suspect	
November 16	Washed Out	
November 18	David Kushner	
November 22	Of The Trees	
November 23	Tornillo	
November 24	The Front Bottoms	
November 29	Animals as Leaders	
December 1	Kiss of Life	
December 2	King Diamond	
December 6	Luke Grimes	
December 8	42 Dugg	
December 10	The Story So Far	
December 13	ARIZONA	
December 19	Matisyahu	

=== 2025 ===
Date	Artists/Show	Ref
January 11	Atliens	
January 16	Bright Eyes	
January 17	Molchat Dolma	
January 19	Phantogram	
January 21	Ani DiFranco	
January 23	Greensky Bluegrass	
January 24	Latin Mafia	
January 27	Travis	
January 30	Dark Star Orchestra	
February 4	Foster the People	
February 5	Thuy	
February 7	Ian	
February 12	Ole 60	
February 16	Zachariah Porter	
February 17	Hinder	
February 19	Cordae	
February 26	070 Shakes	
March 1	Apocalyptica	
March 4	Magic City Hippies	
March 5	Flipturn	
March 8	Badfish	
March 9	Pouya	
March 11	Saint Motel	
March 13	Nessa Barrett	
March 14	Alexandra Kay	
March 15	Deathpact	
March 16	RuPaul: The House of Hidden Meanings Book Tour	
March 17	Yacht Rock Revue	
March 18	Joy Oladokun	
March 20	Tyga	
March 29	Half Alive	
March 30	Cavalera Conspiracy	
March 31	Denzel Curry	
April 1	Shakey Graves	
April 3	Chiodos	
April 6	Kim Dracula	
April 7	Machine Head	
April 9	Elderbrook	
April 10	Amyl and the Sniffers	
April 11	Ben Bohmer	
April 12	Hulvey	
April 13	Napalm Death	
April 16	Artemas	
April 18	Alyssa Edwards	
April 19	Djo	
April 20	Chaos & Carnage	
April 24	Carly Pearce	
April 29	Ministry	
April 30	Mogwai	
May 3	Party101 with DJ Matt Bennett	
May 5	Mayday Parade	
May 6	Livingston	
May 7	Smino	
May 8	Toro y Moi Panda Bear	
May 9	Lukas Nelson	
May 10	Flo	
May 11	And That’s Why We Drink	
May 12	Rilo Kiley	
May 15	Turnover	
May 16	Nightly	
May 18	Hippo Campus	
May 23	The Damned	
May 27	Dope Lemon	
May 30	Perfume Genius	
June 1	Beach Bunny	
June 5	Pod Meets World	
June 6	Alex Warren	
June 7	Raveena Aurora	
June 9	Young Nudy	
June 11	Coco Jones	
June 12	Ninja Sex Party	
June 13	Eslabon Armado	
June 14	Malcolm Todd	
October 22	The Living Tombstone	
October 25	Viagra Boys	
November 1	Murder by Death	
November 2	Garbage	
November 3	Todd Snider Band	
November 4	The 502s	
November 5	Avatar	
November 6	The Beths	
November 7	The Brian Jonestown Massacre	
November 8	Dijon	
November 10	Purity Ring	
November 11	Lovejoy	
November 14	The Happy Fits	
November 15	Destin Conrad	
November 16	Dylan Gossett	
November 18	Hot Mulligan	
November 21	It’s Murph	
November 22	Lily Rose	
December 3	Spike and the Gimme Gimmes	
December 4	Larry Fleet	
December 7	GoldLink	
December 8	OsamaSon	
December 9	Andy Bell	
December 10	Violent Vira	
December 11	The Floozies Dirtwire	
December 12–13	AltAZ 93.3’s Ugly Sweater Holiday Party with James and the Cold Gun Blue October	
December 17	Waterparks The Plain White T’s	
December 21	Leon Thomas	

=== 2026 ===
Date	Artists/Show	Ref
January 19	GoldFord	
January 20	The Runarounds	
January 21	Zachariah Porter	
January 24	Zeppelin USA	
January 29	Dark Star Orchestra	
January 30	Ray Volpe	
January 31	Nothing More	
February 1	Jesse & Joy	
February 2	Elevation Rhythm	
February 5	El Temach	
February 14	Snow Strippers	
February 15	Cat Power	
February 18	All Them Witches	
February 20	Akira Yamaoka	
February 21	Del Water Gap	
February 26	Monolink	
February 27	The Summer Set	
February 28	Magic City Hippies	
March 3	The Strumbellas	
March 4	Sticky Fingers	
March 5	Joey Valence & Brae	
March 6	East Forest	
March 8	Zara Larsson	
March 9	Joyce Manor	
March 10	Colony House	
March 11	Rich Brian	
March 13	Lauren Spencer Smith	
March 15	Sabrina Claudio	
March 16	Jeff Tweedy	
March 17	Machine Girl	
March 18	Ashnikko	
March 20	Snow Tha Product	
March 24	Jesse Welles	
March 25	The Maine	
March 26	Humbe	
March 27	Darcy & Jer	
March 30	Hippie Sabotage	
March 31	The Growlers	
April 1	Sunn O)))	
April 4	Callum Scott	
April 7	Hanabie.	
April 8	Testament	
April 11	Evan Honer	
April 12	Lacuna Coil	
April 13	Devo	
April 15	Buckethead	
April 17	Interpol	
April 18	Maddox Batson	
April 19	Fakemink	
April 21	The Brook & the Bluff	
April 23	Wyatt Flores	
April 24	Braxton Kieth	
April 25	Free Throw	
April 26	The Crane Wives	
April 27	Oh Wonder	
April 29	Health Carpenter Brut	
April 30	Snail Mail	
May 4	Thornhill	
May 5	Hayley Williams	
May 6–7	Baby Keem	
May 8	Acid Bath	
May 9	Two Feet	
May 13	Pennywise	
May 16	Justin Nozuka	
May 20	Behemoth	
May 23	Club 90's: 2000’s Night	
May 27	Juvenile	
May 28	Yacht Rock Revue	
May 29	The Hu Apocalyptica	
May 30	SOB X RBE	
June 1	Wale Smino	
June 4	Pattie Gonia	
June 5	Club 90s: MJ Night	
June 6	Qveen Herby	
June 12	The Altons	
June 13	RX Bandits	
June 17	Toadies	
June 18	3Ball MTY	
June 19	Audrey Hobert	
June 20	Jessica Audiffred	
June 21	Idobi Radio Summer School with Honey Revenge, Winona Fighter, Games We Play, South Arcade, Chase Petra, and Diva Bleach	
June 30	Dance Gavin Dance	
July 1	Kail Lowry	
July 8	T.I.	
July 9	42 Dugg Babyface Ray	
July 10	Kurt Vile and the Violators	
July 17	Live from Laurel Canyon	
July 18	Chris Travis	
July 22	Louie Thesinger	
July 24	Eslabon Armando	
July 28	Flyleaf	
July 29	Chance Pena	
July 31	The Marvelous Miss Gender	
August 2	The Pretty Reckless	
August 3	John Cameron Mitchell	
August 5	Passion Pit	
August 6	Calle 24	
August 8	Poppy	
August 9	Siddhartha	
August 10	T.I.	
August 11	Jutes	
August 12	The Sword	
August 13	Steel Pulse	
August 14	Charles Wesley Godwin	
August 17	Jacquees K Camp	
August 18	Nine Vicious	
August 19	Little Stranger	
August 20	Atmosphere and Friends	
August 24	Hulvey	
August 26	Anees	
August 27	Black Veil Brides	
August 28	Fantasy Footballers Podcast	
August 29	Channel Tres	
September 1	Brandon Flowers	
September 2	Kamelot	
September 8	Thievery Corporation	
September 9	Sleep	
September 12	KevOnStage	
September 14	Slayyyter	
September 15	Peter Hook & the Light	
September 17	Muna	
September 20	Paris Paloma	
September 23	The Midnight	
September 24	Kelela	
September 26	Bilmuri	
September 27	Isaiah Rashad	
September 28	Twin Temple	
September 29	Judah & the Lion	
September 30	Cradle of Filth	
October 1	French Police	
October 2	Sammy Rae & The Friends	
October 3	JPEGMafia	
October 5	Julieta Venegas	
October 6	Sleeping with Sirens	
October 7	Tinlicker	
October 8	Palace	
October 9	Cavetown	
October 10	President	
October 11	EsDeeKid	
October 12	Dying Fetus Sanguisugabogg	
October 13	Schoolboy W	
October 14	Band-Maid	
October 15	Madeon	
October 16	Nekrogoblikon	
October 18	Switchfoot	
October 19	Basement	
October 21	Boy Harsher	
October 22	Thee Sinseers	
October 23	Almost Monday	
October 24	Daniel Sloss	
October 26	Ten	
October 29	Voila	
October 30	Abby Callahan Orville Peck	
November 1	Skillet	
November 2	Alvaro Diaz	
November 3	Montell Fish	
November 6	The Scratch Medium Build	
November 7	Whethan	
November 8	RØZ	
November 9	Bonobo with Hinako Omori	
November 11	Periphery with Ne Obliviscaris	
November 12	State Champs with Cartel and Taylor Acorn	
November 13	Vince Staples with Glare	
