= Sabai (disambiguation) =

A sbai is a shawl-like garment or a cloth hanging from the shoulders, Southeast Asia

Sabai may also refer to

- Sabai (state constituency), in Bentong, Pahang, Malaysia
- Sabai, a Thai-Canadian DJ under the Monstercat label
- sabai grass, Eulaliopsis binata, a perennial plant in the grass family, typically found in Southeast Asia
