= List of Monstercat artists =

This is a list of artists who are recording for or once recorded for Monstercat. This includes artists who have worked with Silk Music before its acquisition by Monstercat in 2021.

== 0–9 ==
- 7 Minutes Dead

== A ==
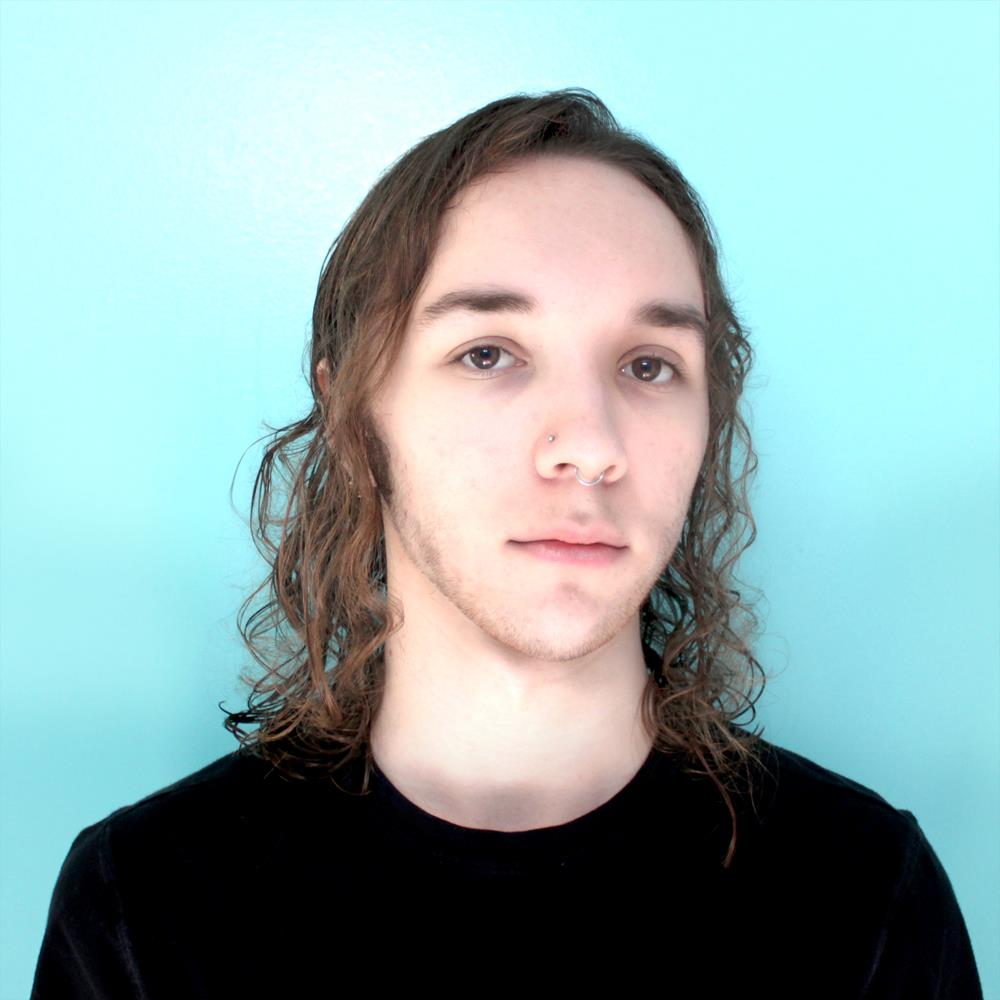
Au5

- Ace Aura
- Ad Brown
- Adventure Club
- Aether
- Afinity
- Afterclapp
- Aiobahn
- Airdraw
- Akylla
- Alleycvt
- Allknight (also featured as Jodie Knight)
- Alrt
- A.M.R
- Anamanaguchi
- Jayeson Andel
- Andromedha
- Anevo
- Angara
- Anjulie
- Annix
- Steve Aoki
- Approaching Black
- Arcando
- Archaellum
- Arlow
- Armnhmr
- Asdek
- Asking Alexandria
- Astroleaf
- ATLiens
- Atmozfears
- Attlas
- Au5
- Jessica Audiffred
- Audioventura
- Aviella

== B ==
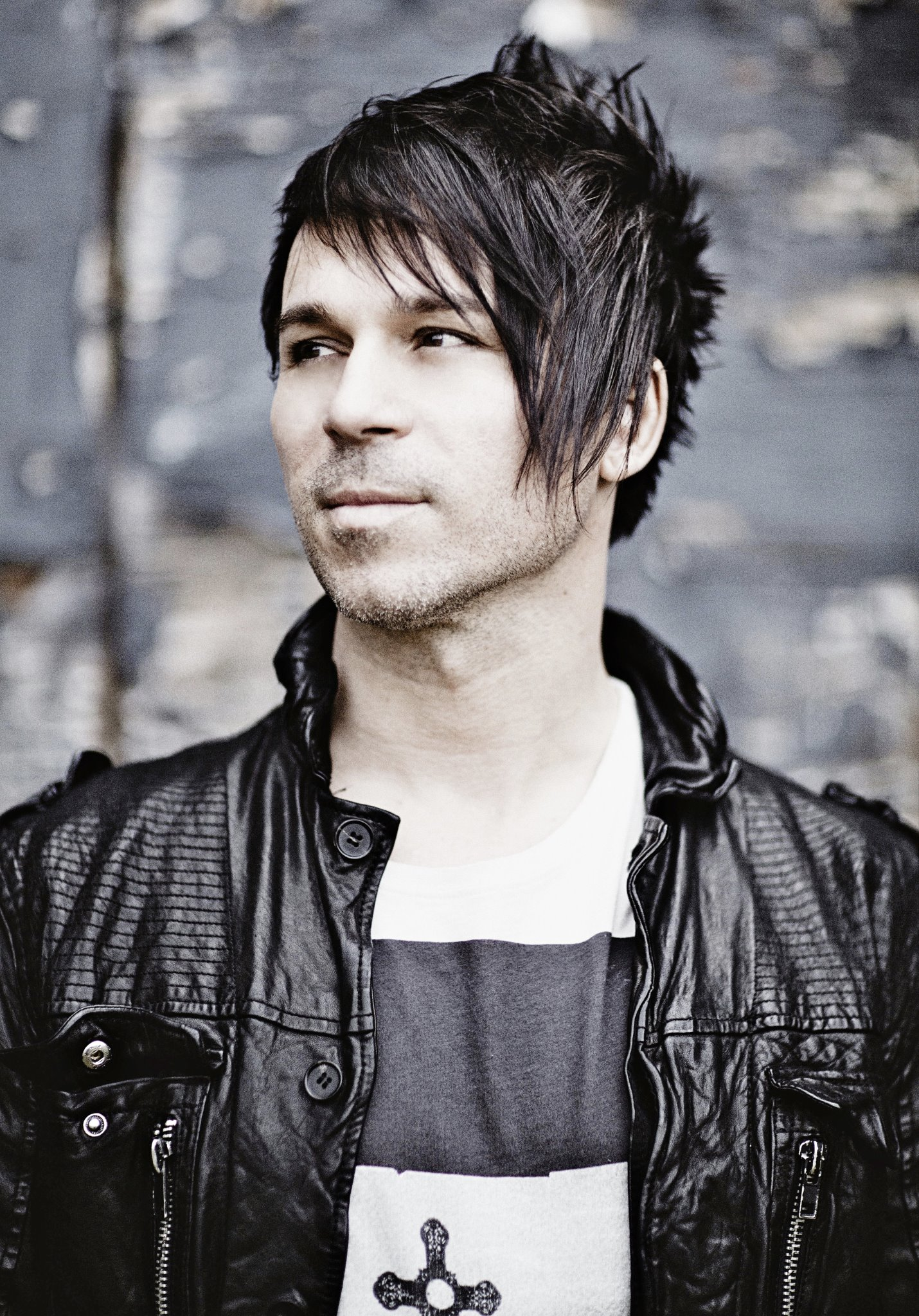
BT

- Bad Computer
- Banaati
- Tasha Baxter
- Bear Grillz
- Beauz
- Bensley
- Bhaskar
- Bianca
- Bishu
- Blanke
- Bleu Clair
- Blastoyz
- Mister Blonde
- Blood Groove & Kikis
- The Bloody Beetroots
- Ilan Bluestone
- Blugazer
- Boogie T
- Boom Jinx
- Borgore
- Bosquet
- Bossfight
- Laura Brehm
- David Broaders
- BT
- Brandyn Burnette

== C ==
- Julian Calor
- Candyland
- Carola
- Nina Carr
- Case & Point
- Jon Casey
- Caster
- Chime
- Chyl
- Circadian
- Cloudcage
- CloudNone
- CoMa
- Conro
- Control Freak
- Casey Cook
- Copycatt
- Cosmaks
- Crankdat
- Crystal Skies
- Culprate
- Leah Culver
- Curbi
- Cyclops

== D ==
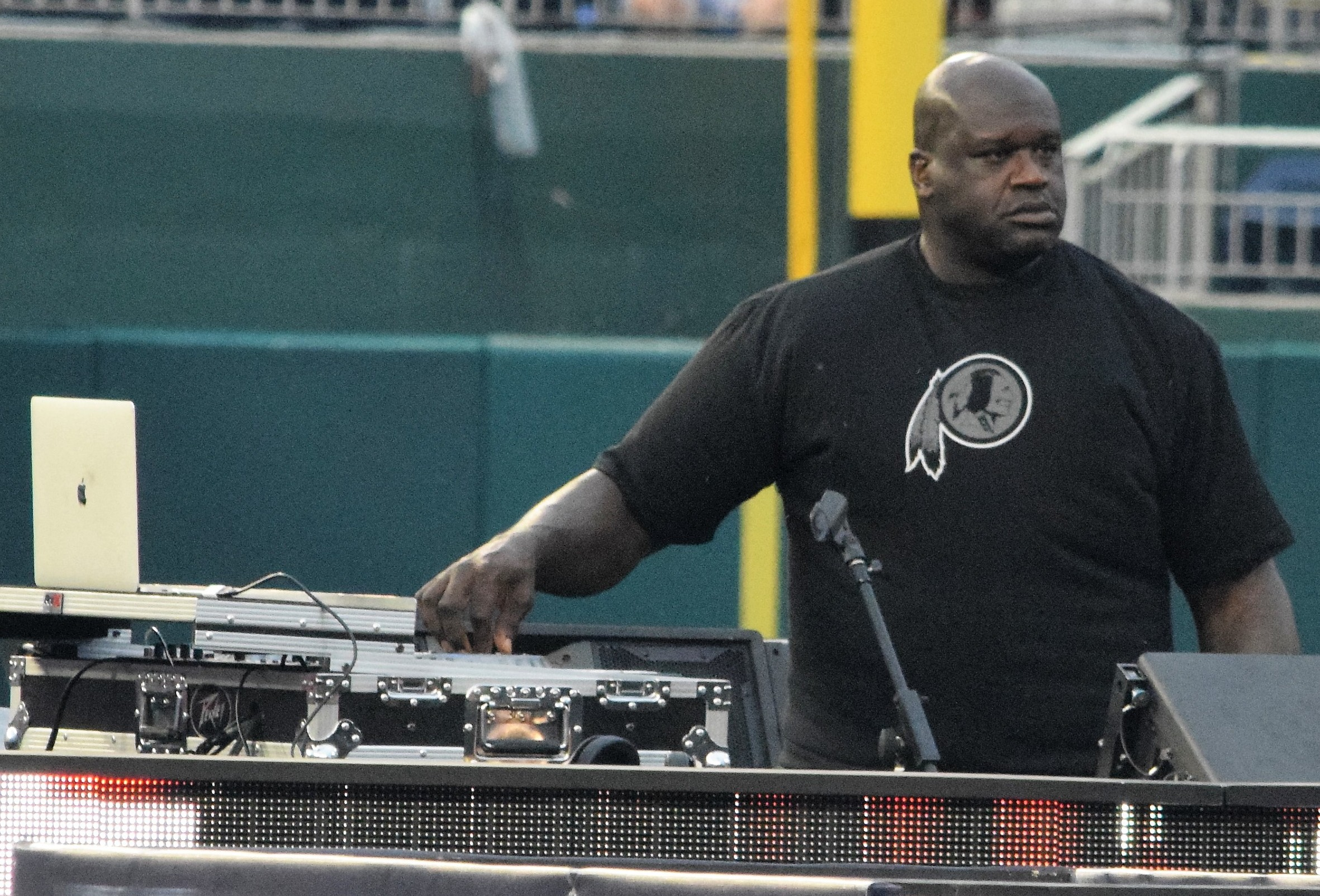
DJ Diesel

- Terry Da Libra
- Dada Life
- Daktyl
- Dashanikon
- Lani Daye
- Sarah de Warren
- Def3
- Defunk
- Delta Heavy
- Fransis Derelle
- Deorro
- Desert Star (also released as Jay Cosmic)
- Don Diablo (as Control Alt Delete)
- Leyla Diamondi
- Didrick
- DJ Diesel
- Direct
- Dirt Monkey
- Dirty Audio
- Dirtyphonics
- Disero
- Dnmo
- Dokho
- DJ Dougal
- Draper
- Droeloe
- Droptek
- Madalen Duke
- Dustycloud
- Duumu
- Dwilly
- Dyro

== E ==
- Rich Edwards
- Egzod (also releases as Merage)
- Eleven.Five
- Elevven
- Elipsa
- Elizaveta
- Ellika
- Ellis
- Elypsis
- Embliss
- Emel
- Gareth Emery
- Eminence
- Enjac
- Ephixa
- Eptic
- Ero808
- Gregory Esayan
- Eskai
- Etza
- Example
- Excision

== F ==
- Fairlane
- Falcon Funk
- Tom Fall
- Matt Fax
- Feed Me
- Feint
- Finding Mero
- Flexible Fire
- Fløa
- Flux Pavilion
- F.O.O.L
- Foreign Beggars
- Forty Cats
- Foxela
- Dillon Francis
- Fractal
- Frost
- Pierce Fulton (since deceased)
- The Funk Hunters
- Fwlr

== G ==
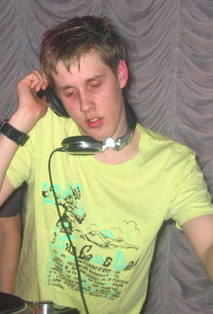
Gammer

- Gammer
- Gent & Jawns
- Glacier
- Glaue
- Glnna
- Godlands
- Going Quantum
- Nigel Good
- Good Times Ahead
- Grabbitz
- Grant (formerly Grant Bowtie)
- Vesk Green
- Guilt Chip

== H ==
- Alex H
- Habstrakt
- Charlotte Haining
- Hairitage
- Half an Orange
- Haliene
- Hammerhead
- Harold-Alexis
- Hausman
- Justin Hawkes (formerly Flite)
- Hayve
- Haywyre
- Spag Heddy
- Hellberg
- Helloworld
- Jacob Henry
- Hex Cougar
- Hexlogic
- Hoaprox
- Hush

== I ==
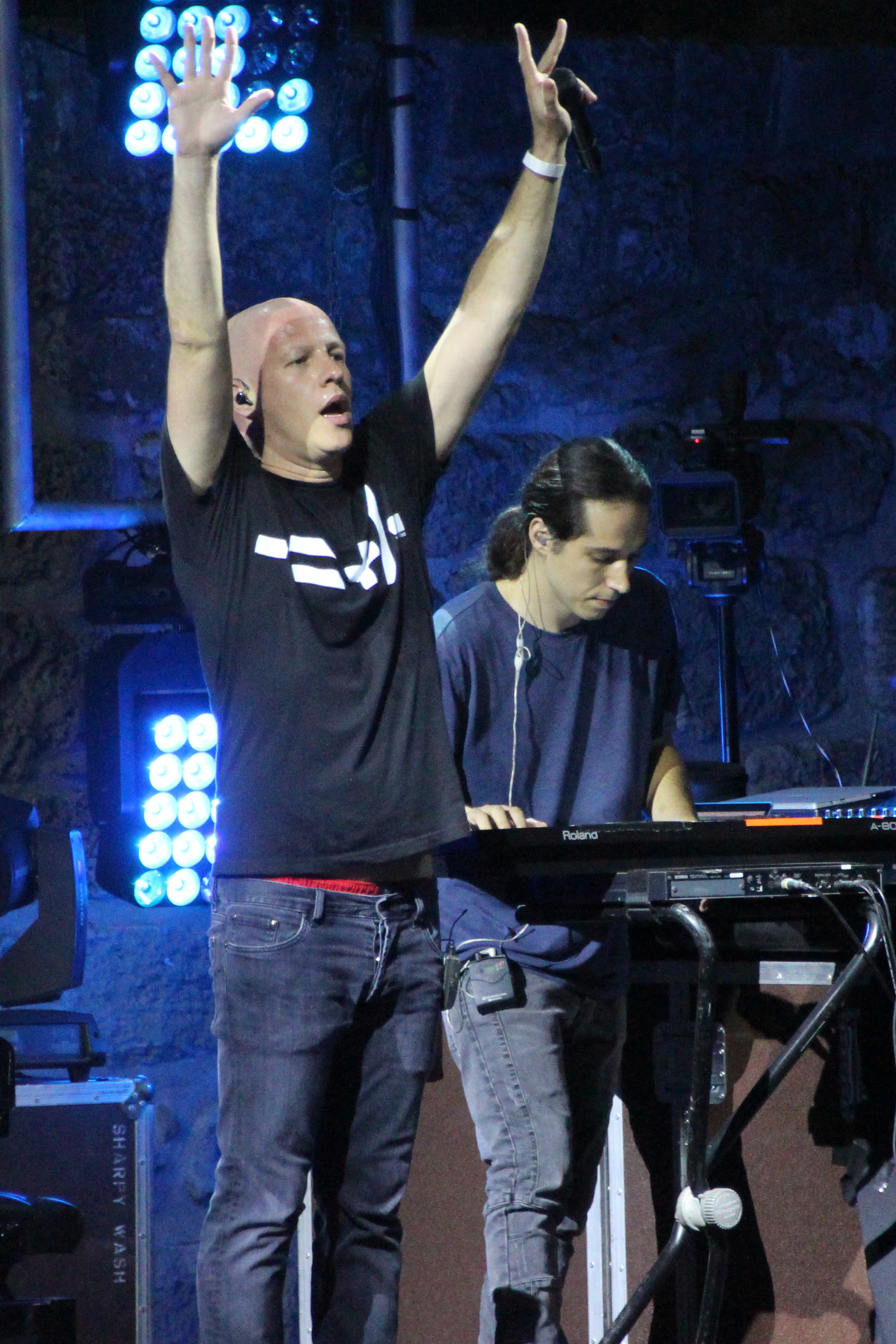
Infected Mushroom

- Masayoshi Iimori
- Ill-esha
- Imallryt
- Infected Mushroom
- Infekt
- Intercom
- Inverness
- Ivory

== J ==
- Jay FM
- Jauz
- Jo.E
- Joe Jonas
- Just a Gent

== K ==
- Kage
- Delaney Kai
- Kai Wachi
- Karra
- Kaskade
- Kayzo
- Kazukii
- KC
- Kdyn
- Keanler
- Keepsake (stage name of Richard Caddock)
- Kill Paris
- Kill the Noise
- Dani King
- Dexter King
- Sullivan King
- Knife Party
- Roy Knox
- Kobana
- Kohmi
- Kompany
- Kotek
- Koven
- Krewella
- Kumarion
- Kuuro

== L ==
- Lar
- Britt Lari
- Laszlo
- Danny Leax
- Leotrix
- Level Up
- Lewyn
- Lil Hank
- Lisa Lobsinger
- Lookas
- Loosid
- LTN
- Luma
- Lumynesynth
- Lvther (formerly TwoThirds)

== M ==
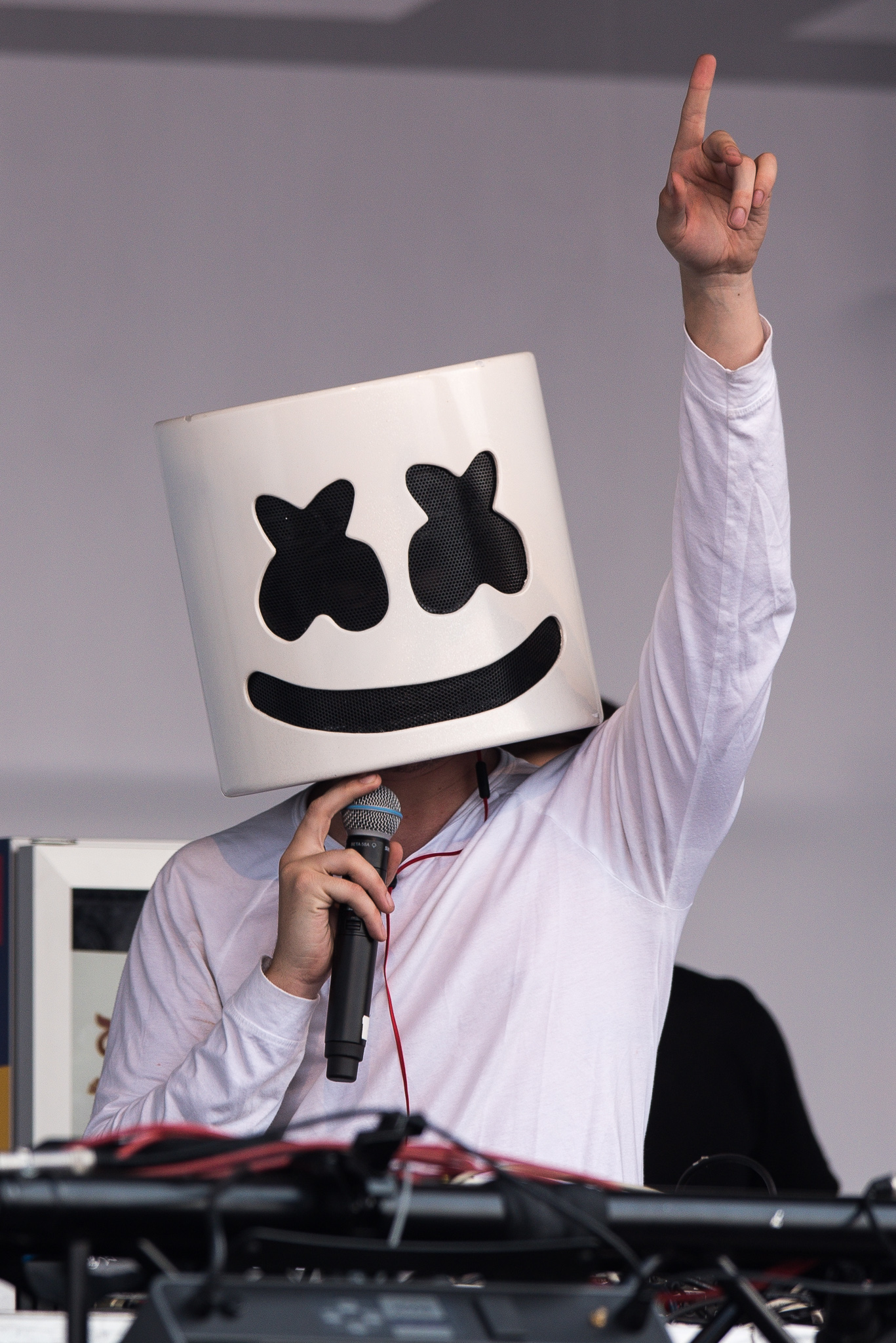
Marshmello

- Maazel
- GG Magree
- Maliboux
- Mango
- Arielle Maren
- Marsh
- Marshmello
- Cat Martin
- Micah Martin
- Matroda
- Dylan Matthew
- Tylor Maurer
- Mazare
- Mick Mazoo
- Maylyn
- McCall
- Meeting Molly
- MeHiLove
- Melano
- Melchi
- Memba
- Julia Michaels
- Midoca
- Brandon Mignacca
- DJ Mii
- Misc.Inc.
- Miyoki
- Mizar B
- Modestep
- More Plastic
- Moss
- Icarus Moth
- Mr. Bill
- Mr FijiWiji
- Muzz (formerly Muzzy)
- Mylk
- Myrne

== N ==
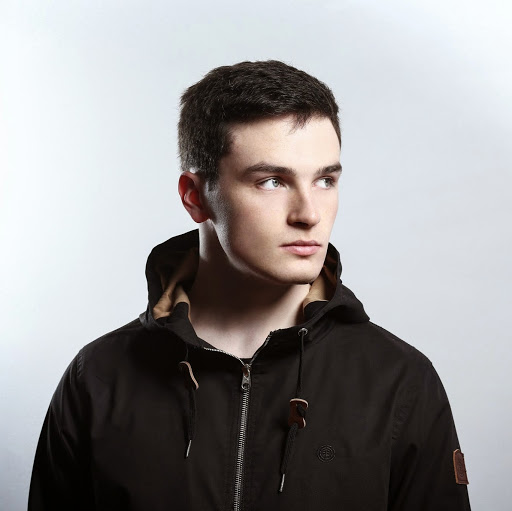
Noisestorm

- Danyka Nadeau
- Naden
- Shingo Nakamura
- Nanobii
- Nervo
- Nevve
- Nghtmre
- Robert Nickson (as RNX)
- The Night
- Nitro Fun
- Nitti Gritti
- No Mana
- Noisestorm
- Nonsens
- Nostalgix
- Notaker
- Nurko
- Nuzb
- Nytrix

== O ==
- Oaks
- Oblvyn
- Ocula
- OddKidOut
- Justin Oh
- Odsen
- One True God
- Øneheart
- Ookay
- Ovsky
- Öwnboss

== P ==
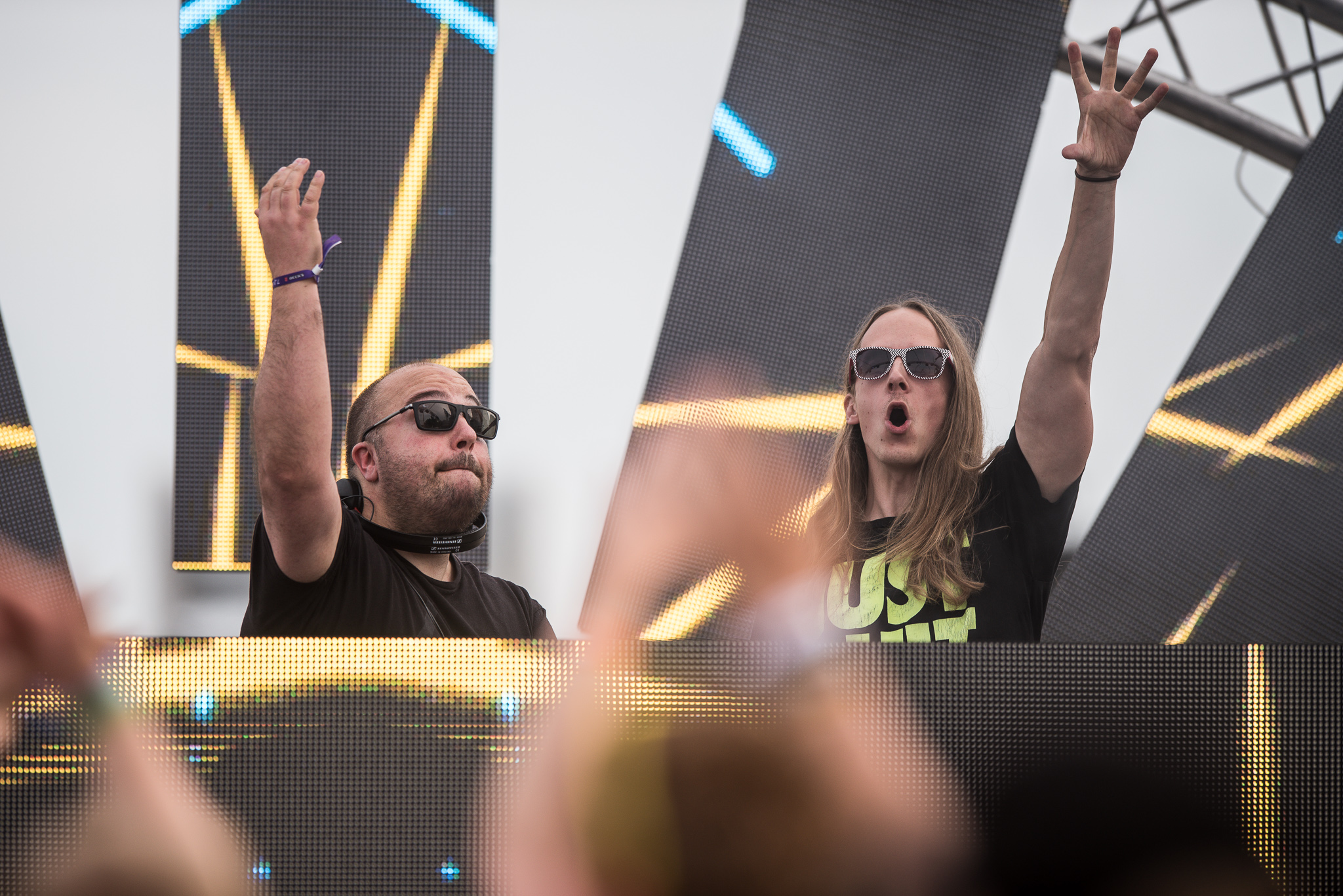
Pegboard Nerds

- Papa Khan
- Park Avenue
- Pegboard Nerds
- Pixel Terror
- Pixl
- Point North
- Jordin Post
- Proff
- Project 46
- Protostar
- Punctual
- Puppet
- Pylot

== Q ==
- Q'Aila
- Quiet Disorder
- Quix

== R ==
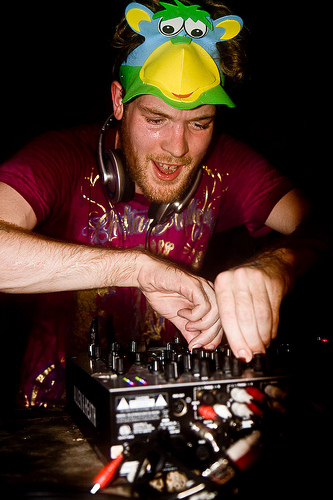
Rusko

- R7cky
- Raizhell (formerly Razihel)
- Rameses B
- Rated R
- Reach
- Reaper
- Referna
- Haley Reinhart
- Riley
- Bella Renee
- Rezonate
- Rezz
- Ricci
- Aaron Richards
- Claire Ridgely
- Riot
- Riot Ten
- Rival
- Oliver River
- JT Roach
- Mike Robert
- Rogue
- Tony Romera
- Nicky Romero
- Roniit
- Rootkit
- Leela Rosa
- Claes Rosen
- Jason Ross
- Royal & the Serpent
- Josh Rubin
- Runn
- Rusko
- Meron Ryan
- Ryyzn

== S ==
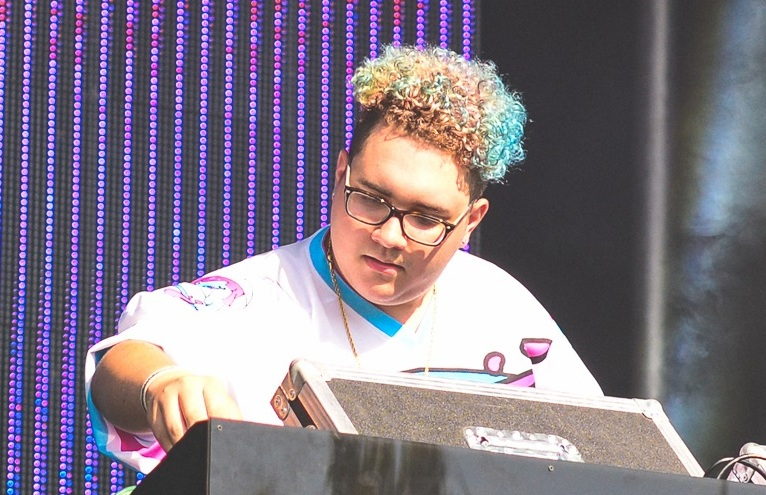
Slushii

- Sabai
- Said the Sky
- Saint Punk
- SampliFire
- San Holo
- Savage
- Savoi
- Savoy
- Saxsquatch
- Schodt
- Scndl
- Selva
- Seven Lions
- Jordan Shaw
- ShockOne
- Dan Sieg
- Silent Child
- Sippy
- Silverstein
- Tia Simone
- Sivz
- Skua
- Skybreak
- Skyelle
- Skyler (formerly Skyler Madison)
- Slander
- Slippy (formerly Slips & Slurs)
- Slumberjack
- Slushii
- Smalltown DJs
- Smle
- Snavs
- SNR
- So Sus
- Soltan
- Sophon
- Soulji
- Sound Quelle
- SpaceMan Zack
- David Spekter
- Splitbreed
- Sportmode
- Katrine Stenbekk
- Stendahl
- Stephen
- Fox Stevenson
- Stonebank
- Philip Strand
- Darren Styles
- Subtact
- Summer Was Fun (also released as DotEXE)
- Svdden Death

== T ==
- Rylan Taggart
- Taglo
- Tails
- Teddy Killerz
- Teminite
- Terro
- Thirst
- Liam Thomas
- Lewis Thompson
- Throttle
- Dion Timmer
- Tisoki
- Tmpst
- Tokyo Machine
- Topi
- Tristam
- Trivecta
- Trove
- TroyBoi
- Tut Tut Child
- Tynan

== U ==
- Unlike Pluto
- Dr. Ushūu
- UZ

== V ==
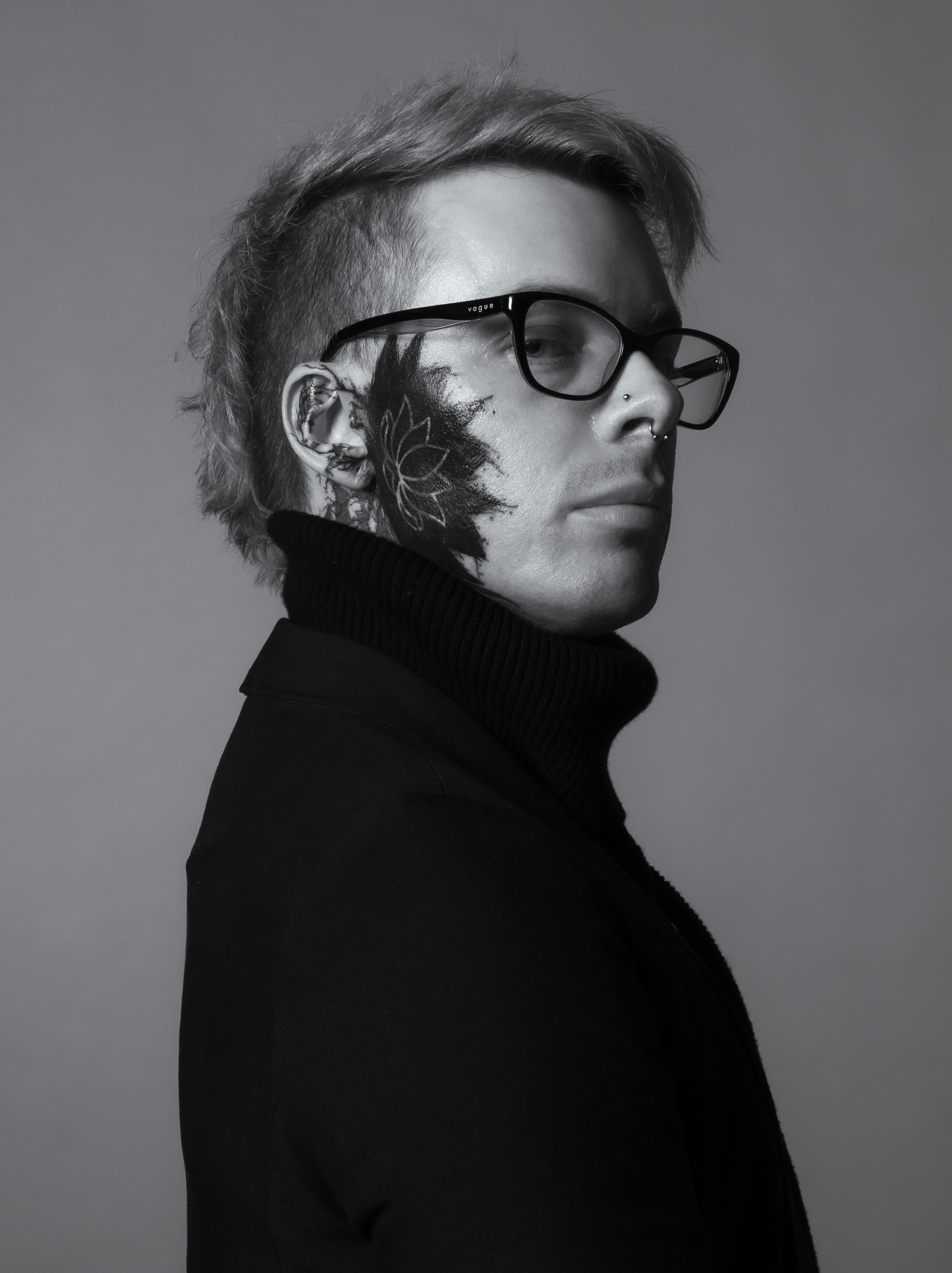
Varien

- Matt Van
- Varien
- Vastive
- Elle Vee
- Veela
- Veeshy
- Vicetone
- Enviado Vida
- Vin
- Vindata
- Vintage & Morelli
- Virtual Riot
- Vluarr
- Ray Volpe
- Vowl.

== W ==
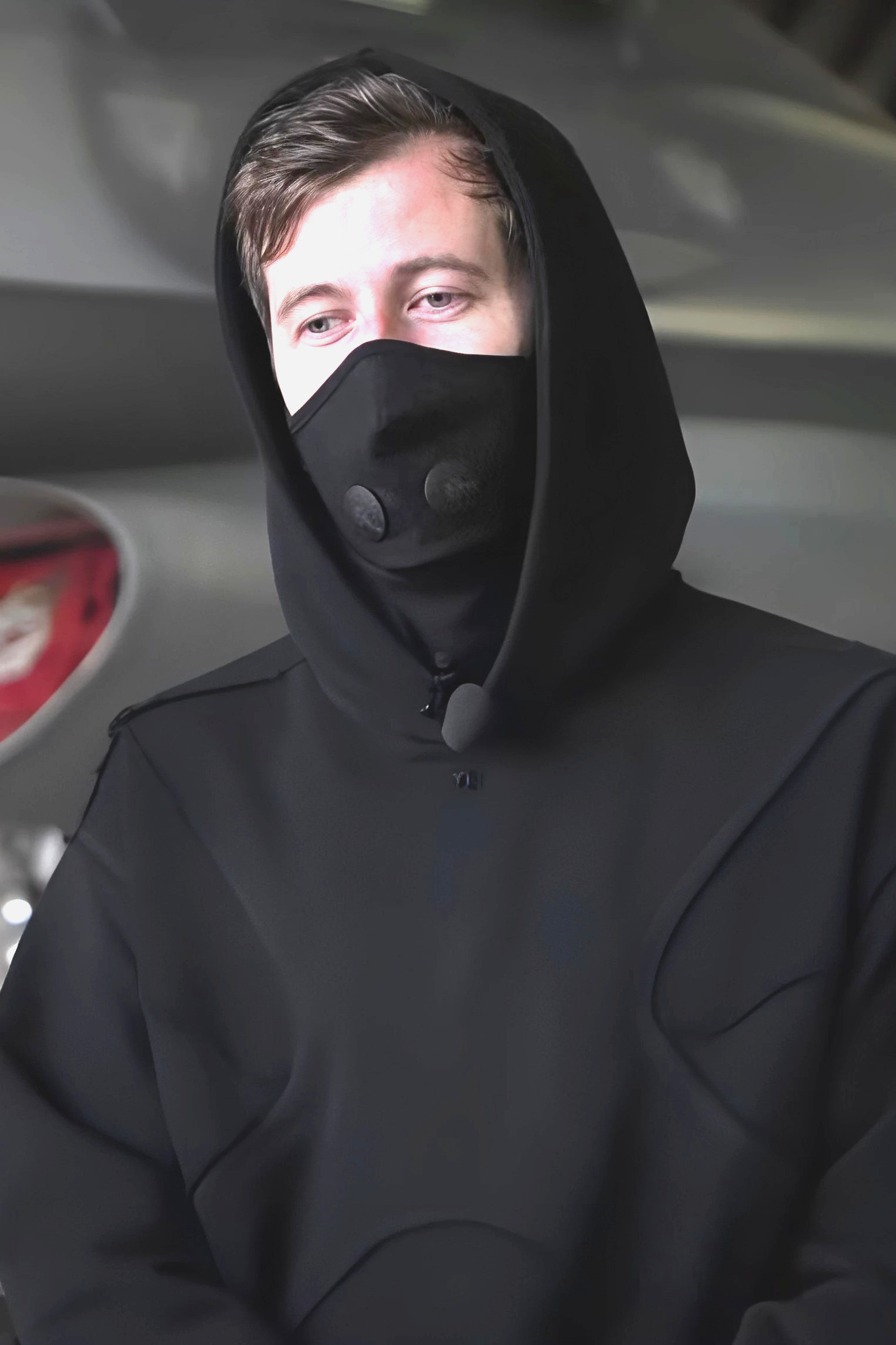
Alan Walker

- Alan Walker
- Stephen Walking
- Warner Case
- Zac Waters
- Weird Genius
- Matt Wertz
- Weston & Teston
- Whales
- What So Not
- Whipped Cream
- The Widdler
- Will K
- Wind Walkers
- Wooli
- Wrld
- Wynnwood

== X ==
- Xilent

== Y ==
- Yako
- Yetep
- Adam Young
- Yula
- Anna Yvette

== Z ==
- Manu Zain
- Zensei ゼンセー
- Zero Hero
- Terry Zhong
- Z:N
- Cozi Zuehlsdorff
