= Jared & The Mill =

American indie rock band

- Origin: Phoenix, Arizona, U.S.
- Genres: Indie rock, folk rock
- Years active: 2011–2021
- Label: Independent
- Members: Jared Kolesar; Michael Carter; Larry Gast III; Chuck Morriss III; Josh Morin
- Past members: Gabe Hall-Rodrigues
- Website: jaredandthemill.com

Jared & The Mill (also Jared and The Mill) was an indie rock band from Phoenix, Arizona formed in 2011. The band consists of Jared Kolesar (vocals, acoustic guitar), Michael Carter (banjo, electric guitar), Larry Gast III (electric guitar), Chuck Morriss III (bass), and Josh Morin (drums). It was announced on February 17, 2021 (via Twitter) that the band had split and Kolesar would be pursuing his solo project, Wheelwright.

== History ==
Jared & The Mill met through mutual friends while in college, at Arizona State University.

== Discography ==
=== Track listing ===
- Breathe Me In
- Returning Half
- In Our Youth
- Ides of Fall
- Love to Be Found
- What Would You Do
- Talewind
- Brave Young Man
- Know Your Face
- Just For Now
- Wrecking Ball
- Western Expansion

=== Track listing ===
- Crawl
- Hold On
- She
- Messengers
- Young & Dumb
- Life We Chose

=== Track listing ===
- Home
- Hold On
- Messengers
- Keep Me Going
- Young & Dumb

=== Orme Dugas – EP (2016) ===
Jared & the Mill commenced the "Keep Me Going" tour in August 2016 around the United States to promote the EP Orme Dugas which was released on September 9, 2016.

=== Track listing ===
- Lost, Scared & Tired
- Keep Me Going
- Still Alone
- Ghosts
- Song for a Girl

=== Track listing ===
- Soul in Mind
- Broken Bird
- Break in the Ether
- Valley of the Sun
- Hope
- Kelsee's Shelves
- Wilderness Call
- Dark Highways
- Jared and the Mill Sucks
- Tightrope Walker
- Feels Like
- Chisel
- Dying Fear
- Monica Voicemail
- Since I Met You
- Books

=== Track listing ===
- Eliza
