= Myrne (musician) =

Singaporean DJ and record producer

MYRNE
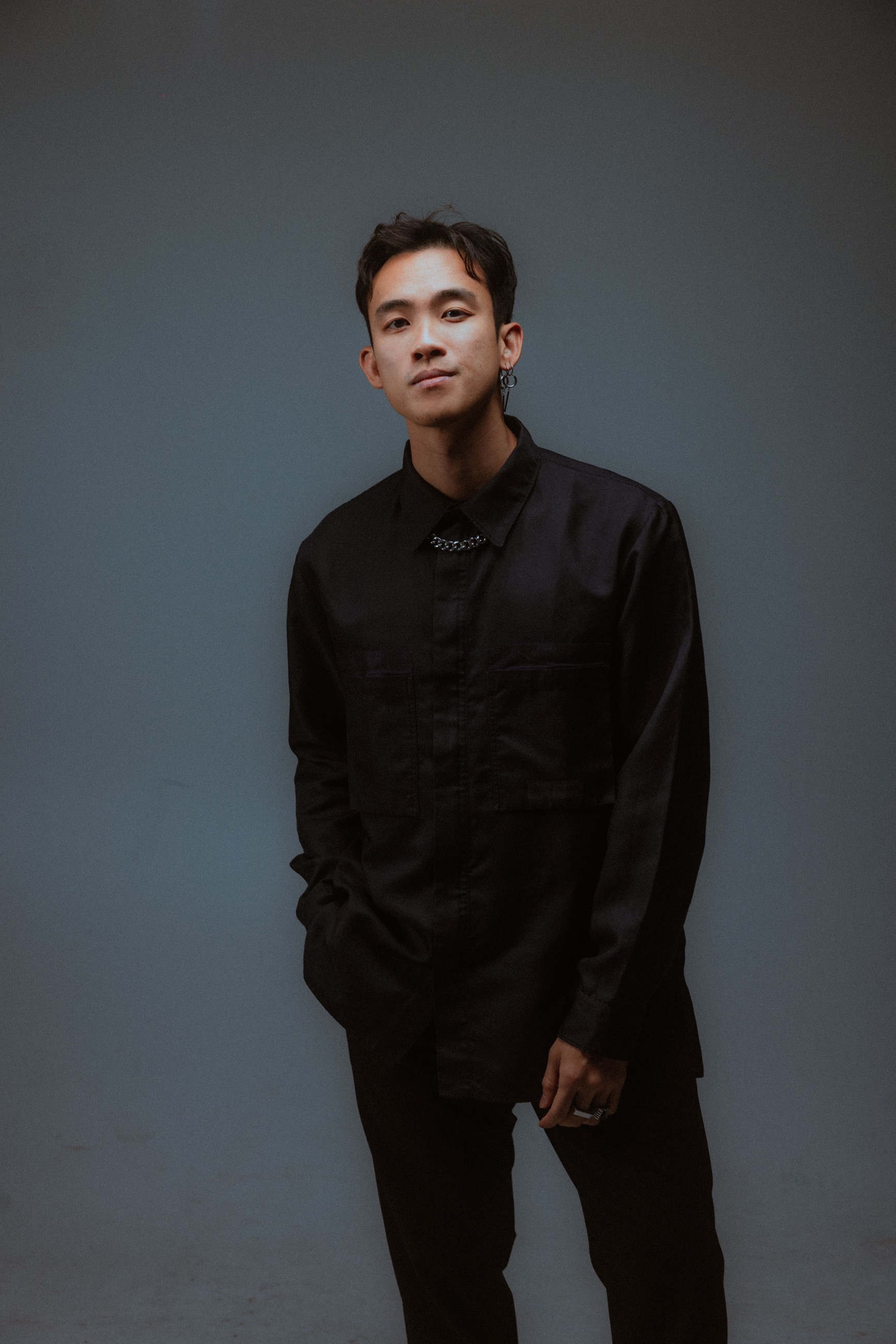
- MYRNE in 2025

Background information
- Born: Manfred Lim
- Origin: Singapore
- Genres: Future bass, Progressive House,Trance Music
- Occupations: DJ, record producer
- Years active: 2015–present
- Labels: Mad Decent, Ultra Music, Astralwerks, This Never Happened
- Website: myrne.co

Manfred Lim (born 1995), better known by his stage name MYRNE, is a Singaporean DJ, songwriter, and record producer. He is recognized as the first Asian artist to sign with Diplo's Mad Decent label, and was the first Singaporean act to perform at major international festivals including Ultra Music Festival in Miami and Tomorrowland in Belgium.

== Early life and education ==
Lim was born and raised in Singapore. He began classical piano training at the age of 10 and eventually achieved Grade 8 certification. He attended St. Andrew's Junior College and later graduated from Singapore Management University (SMU) with a degree in social science, majoring in political science.

== Career ==
Lim began producing music in 2012 and was classically trained in music from a young age. He gained international recognition in 2015 when he was signed to the American record label Mad Decent after his work was discovered on SoundCloud.

In 2018, MYRNE became the first Singaporean act to perform at major international electronic music festivals Ultra Miami and Tomorrowland. Following his debut studio album In Search of Solitude (2019), he signed a multi-record deal with Ultra Music.

Between 2018 and 2020, MYRNE produced several official remixes and productions for high-profile artists. In March 2018, MYRNE co-produced the single "I Wanna Know" by American producer RL Grime, featuring vocals from Daya. The track was released via Mad Decent and WeDidIt Records. In August 2018, his remix of "Ocean" by Martin Garrix and Khalid was released as part of the Ocean (Remixes Vol. 2) EP on STMPD RCRDS. This was followed in October 2018 by an official remix of "There's No Way" by Lauv featuring Julia Michaels. In August 2020, he released a remix of the Becky Hill and Sigala collaboration "Heaven on My Mind" via Polydor Records.

In 2022, he returned to a progressive and deep house-inspired sound, signing with Astralwerks to release the EP Circles. In early 2025, MYRNE released the Heal EP on Lane 8's label This Never Happened. The title track with Shallou, Heal, reached number one on the SiriusXM Chill chart. This was followed shortly by the Field EP (2025), a project that further explored deep house and ambient influences.

== Discography ==
=== Studio albums ===
| Year | Title | Label |
|---|---|---|
| 2019 | In Search of Solitude | Ultra Records |
| 2018 | B4NGER PROJECT (with Gentle Bones) | Universal Music |

=== Extended plays ===
| Year | Title | Label |
|---|---|---|
| 2015 | Softsins | Mad Decent |
| 2020 | Wandering | Ultra Records |
| 2022 | Circles | Astralwerks |
| 2024 | The Four Stages | This Never Happened |
| 2025 | Heal EP | This Never Happened |
| 2025 | Field EP | This Never Happened |
