= Warner Case =

- Born: New York, United States
- Occupations: Disc jockey; record producer; songwriter

Warner Case is an American dance music musician, producer, and DJ. He is the founder of the label Top Right Records.

== Biography ==
Case is originally from New York and received classical training as a percussionist at Cornell University, also studying for a semester at the Sorbonne University in Paris.

He sent some demos of his to the French record label Kitsuné Musique, with which he released the single "idunno," later working with Potion Records and Headroom Records. In 2021, he released the single "feel it yah." His single "show you how i feel" was included on Billboard's Top 50 Dance Songs in 2022. His single "summer on the inside" went viral, with over 90 million streams on Spotify and being used by brands such as McLaren and Vogue France. He toured in Spain in 2025, performing concerts in Madrid and Barcelona.

Case has collaborated with DJs Oliver Heldens, The Magician, and Kyle Watson and has shared the stage with artists such as Disclosure. Artists such as David Guetta, Diplo, and Tiësto have spoken in favor of his music.

== Discography ==
- Dance Music For Dancing, vol. 1 (2019)
- Dance Music For Dancing, vol. 2 (2020)
- Dance Music For Dancing, vol. 3 (2022)
- Nightfall (2024)
- Love (sic), Missy Elliott (2026)
