= CellFactor =

Cellfactor may refer to:

CellFactor may refer to:

- CellFactor: Psychokinetic Wars, a 2009 downloadable video game
- CellFactor: Revolution, a 2007 tech demo for PhysX cards
