= Internal Drive =

Internal Drive may refer to:

- Internal drive propulsion, a form of marine propulsion commonly used in recreational boating
- ID Tech Camps, a computer camp, formerly referred to as "Internal Drive"
