= Psyonix =

American video game developer

Psyonix LLC
- Type: Subsidiary
- Industry: Video games
- Founded: 2000; 26 years ago in Satellite Beach, Florida, US
- Founder: Dave Hagewood
- Headquarters: San Diego, US
- Key people: Dave Hagewood (studio director)
- Number of employees: 132 (2019)
- Parent: Epic Games (2019–present)
- Website: psyonix.com

Psyonix LLC is an American video game developer based in San Diego. It was founded in 2000 by Dave Hagewood with the team of his Internet-focused company WebSite Machines. After canceling its first two projects, Psyonix created VehicleMOD, a mod that adds vehicles to Unreal Tournament 2003. The game's developer, Epic Games, subsequently hired the studio to recreate this gameplay for a game mode in Unreal Tournament 2004. Psyonix subsisted off contract work and released its first original game, Supersonic Acrobatic Rocket-Powered Battle-Cars, in 2008. The game was not as successful as anticipated but Hagewood held on to the game's concept and had a small team prototype a sequel while the rest of the company worked on further contract projects. This sequel was released as Rocket League in 2015 and became a major commercial success. Epic Games acquired the studio in May 2019.

== History ==
=== Foundation and VehicleMOD (2000–2003) ===
Psyonix was founded by Dave Hagewood, a native of Charlotte, North Carolina. He had started programming in 1983, at the age of eight, when he modified the dialog for a text adventure game, lending him an advantage in this field at school. In 1995, he abandoned his computer science degree and dropped out of college to establish ArrowWeb, a web hosting company, and later WebSite Machines, which developed multimedia and Internet software. Hagewood heavily invested in the Internet industry and operated his companies out of Satellite Beach, Florida, but faced great competition. In his spare time, he occasionally modded video games, often with vehicles, but was under the impression that making games for a living was "an impossible dream". Still, in 2000, as the WebSite Machines team sought to transition to video game development, Hagewood established Psyonix with them. The company name was derived from his interest in psionics and "fascination with the concept of intelligence and the innate powers of the human mind".

Psyonix's first project was Proteus, a vehicular combat game. Unhappy with the game engine chosen for the undertaking, it was quickly abandoned for the company to shift to Unreal Engine. Its first Unreal Engine game was Vampire Hunter: The Dark Prophecy, an action game with first-person exploration and third-person melee. The game was announced in 2002 but soon became too large in scope for its intended budget. After the studio completed a demo and pitched it to potential publishers, it briefly experimented with adding vehicles to the 2002 game Unreal Tournament 2003, something Hagewood felt it had been lacking. After a few weeks of development, the team felt the project had potential and shelved Vampire Hunter in its favor.

In December 2002, after several months of work, Mark Rein of Epic Games, the developer of Unreal Engine and Unreal Tournament 2003, called Hagewood to inquire about the status of Vampire Hunter. Hagewood informed him about the studio's more recent work, which it called VehicleMOD, and Rein asked to be shown a prototype at the Game Developers Conference in March 2003. Until then, Psyonix worked to include functioning prototypes for all vehicles and multiplayer support. Impressed with this demo, Epic Games sought further talks but wanted to see how quickly the project could progress. Psyonix worked through three weeks of crunch and enlisted independent modders to create three maps for VehicleMOD. Hagewood showcased the newer version at Epic Games' offices in North Carolina, and the company immediately signed Psyonix to develop this mod as a game mode for Unreal Tournament 2004, which became known as Onslaught. Hagewood believed that working with Epic Games remotely from Florida would impact the mode's quality, so he relocated Psyonix to Raleigh, North Carolina, later in 2003. Rein paid for the moving expenses. Around the same time, Hagewood abandoned his work in web hosting.

=== Contract work and first original games (2003–2013) ===
In Raleigh, Psyonix consisted largely of Hagewood and interns hired from nearby universities. To stay afloat, the studio accepted contract work from Epic Games to help develop games in Unreal Engine, including Gears of War and Unreal Tournament III. Hagewood ultimately sought to move West and create original games with Psyonix. In 2006, the team devised Track Addict, a vehicle platform game with time trial stages, partially inspired by the Tony Hawk's and SSX series of extreme sports video games. The studio pitched the game to various publishers and agreed with Microsoft to release the game on the company's Xbox platform. During the game's development, one person put a soccer ball into a level, which the team enjoyed so much that they decided to design the game around that instead. Hagewood informed Microsoft about the change in direction, and the two companies parted ways. The game was ultimately released in 2008 for the PlayStation 3 as Supersonic Acrobatic Rocket-Powered Battle-Cars. The team chose an unusually long name hoping that it would attract attention. In the meantime, SouthPeak Games had contracted Psyonix to develop Monster Madness: Grave Danger, an updated port of Monster Madness: Battle for Suburbia, which was released for the PlayStation 3 in the same year.

While Supersonic Acrobatic Rocket-Powered Battle-Cars broke even, it attracted fewer players than anticipated and did not bring about a significant profit, causing Psyonix to return to contract work. Still, Hagewood believed that the existing fanbase warranted Psyonix's next original game to be a sequel. Out of 50 employees, he kept a handful working on such a title, while the rest was engaged with contract work. In December 2009, the studio and all of its employees moved from Raleigh to larger offices in San Diego, near the city's Gaslamp Quarter. Later contract projects included Whizzle (a tech demo for the Unreal Development Kit) and additional work on Bulletstorm, Homefront, Mass Effect 3, and XCOM: Enemy Unknown. In November 2012, Psyonix released an original mobile shooter, ARC Squadron, for iOS. An enhanced version, ARC Squadron: Redux, came out for iOS and Android in October 2013.

=== Rocket League and acquisition by Epic Games (2013–present) ===
Also in 2013, the sequel to Supersonic Acrobatic Rocket-Powered Battle-Cars entered production. With a budget of under US$2 million, Psyonix developed Rocket League over two years. Hagewood argued that Supersonic Acrobatic Rocket-Powered Battle-Cars was "too hardcore", leading to a change of pace for Rocket League. The game was released to immediate success in July 2015 for Windows and the PlayStation 4. It increased Psyonix's profits 100-fold and brought in $110 million within one year. Psyonix quickly expanded to 70 people by December 2016 and consequently moved to a larger office in the 1 Columbia Place tower, spanning 40,000 square feet (3,700 m^{2}) across two floors. Hagewood sought to grow the tech industry in San Diego, such as through his investment in Zesty.io. The expanded team continued to support Rocket League through additional content, and Psyonix partnered with Twitch, a video game livestreaming service, to establish the Rocket League Championship Series as the game's official esports tournament. In April 2018, the studio began prototyping a mobile Rocket League spin-off ultimately named Rocket League Sideswipe.

On May 1, 2019, Epic Games announced its acquisition of Psyonix to undisclosed terms. At the time, the studio had 132 employees and planned to continue supporting Rocket League. From his proceeds of the sale, Hagewood bought the Benetti Galaxy, a 56-metre (184 ft) superyacht, and intended to invest in space tourism. Epic Games published Rocket League Sideswipe for Android and iOS in November 2021 and Psyonix's Rocket Racing game mode for Fortnite in December 2023.

== Games developed ==
Year	Title	Platform(s)	Publisher(s)	Notes	Ref.
2008	Monster Madness: Grave Danger	PlayStation 3	SouthPeak Games	Updated port of Monster Madness: Battle for Suburbia	
2008	Supersonic Acrobatic Rocket-Powered Battle-Cars	PlayStation 3	Psyonix		
2009	Whizzle	Windows	Psyonix	Unreal Development Kit tech demo	
2012	ARC Squadron	iOS	Psyonix		
2013	ARC Squadron: Redux	Android, iOS	Psyonix	Updated version of ARC Squadron	
2015	Rocket League	Linux, macOS, Nintendo Switch, PlayStation 4, Windows, Xbox One	Psyonix	Deprecated for macOS and Linux in March 2020	
2021	Rocket League Sideswipe	Android, iOS	Epic Games		
2023	Rocket Racing	Android, Nintendo Switch, PlayStation 4, PlayStation 5, Windows, Xbox One, Xbox Series X/S	Epic Games	Part of Fortnite	

=== Additional work ===
Year	Title	Lead developer(s)	Ref.
2004	Unreal Tournament 2004	Epic Games	
2006	Gears of War	Epic Games	
2007	Unreal Tournament III	Epic Games	
2011	Bulletstorm	People Can Fly, Epic Games	
2011	Homefront	Kaos Studios	
2012	Mass Effect 3	BioWare	
2012	XCOM: Enemy Unknown	Firaxis Games	

=== Canceled ===
- Proteus
- Vampire Hunter: The Dark Prophecy
- Nosgoth
