= Id tech (disambiguation) =

Id tech may refer to:

- International Display Technology, an IBM/Chi Mei partnership sold to Sony in 2005
- id Tech, a series of game engines developed by id Software
- ID Tech Camps, a computer camp, also referred to as "iD Tech"
