= Rocket League Sideswipe =

2021 video game

- Google Play Store cover art
- Developer: Psyonix
- Publisher: Psyonix
- Platforms: Android iOS
- Release: WW: November 29, 2021
- Genre: Sports
- Modes: Single-player, multiplayer

Rocket League Sideswipe is a free-to-play mobile vehicular soccer video game published by Psyonix. It serves as a spin-off of Rocket League, but with 2D computer graphics. An alpha version of the game was released in Oceania in March 2021 before the game was given a worldwide release in late November of the same year. It offers fast-paced gameplay similar to that of its console and PC counterpart, but in 2 dimensions.

== Gameplay ==
Sideswipe typically has the same type of gameplay as its console version, in which players must move their cars to hit the ball into the opponent's goal. If both teams are tied at the 0-second mark (at this point, the game won't end unless the ball hits the ground or a goal is scored), the game will enter a sudden death phase in which the first team to score wins. The only key difference between the console version of Rocket League and Sideswipe is the absence of 3D computer graphics. The game has multiple single-player and multiplayer modes, including game modes that revolve around sports other than soccer, such as basketball, squash and volleyball.

The game has casual playlists and competitive (known as Ranked) playlists in which players are given a rank during the game's competitive "season". They will rank up a sub-division by winning and will rank down a sub-division by losing. The ranks, from highest to lowest are Grand Champion (in which players cannot demote out of), Champion, Diamond, Platinum, Gold, Silver, Bronze, and Unranked, which is when the player has never played the game before or on a new account.

At the end of the season (which typically lasts 55 days), players will receive rewards based on whether they won a match in their peak rank or not. Players can also go up two sub-divisions in one match until they reach Platinum. Bronze and Silver have three sub-divisions per division, Gold and Platinum have four, and Diamond and Champion have five. Grand Champion does not use sub-divisions, instead using a Matchmaking Ratio (MMR) system that will record a player's place on the Grand Champion leaderboards.

Season 20 introduced a new stadium called Nebula Bay, which has a space theme.

The game is currently in its 28th ranked season, "[Paceholder]", which began on June 1, 2026.

== Development ==
In an interview with Pocket Gamer, Psyonix employees Bethany Leuenberger and Robert Garza explained the origins and development of the game, in which the latter says the founder of Psyonix, Dave Hagewood, realized there was a "market for a car soccer game on mobile", sparking the idea for Rocket League Sideswipe. Development started in April 2018 with a "very tiny" team working on the game. Three playtests were released, the third of which involved a Psyonix employee who was stated to be very good at the main game. Both Leuenberger and Garza were said to be "extremely" and "insanely" happy with the game's launch. The game has been reported to have acquired 20 million downloads in the first forty days of its worldwide release.

== Reception ==
Reception

Aggregate score
Aggregator	Score
Metacritic	86/100

Review scores
Publication	Score
Destructoid	9/10
GameSpot	9/10
Jeuxvideo.com	16/20
Pocket Gamer	5/5 stars
Gamereactor	8/10
PCMag	4/5

The game received "generally favorable" reviews from aggregator Metacritic.

It was given a 9/10 by Destructoid, and a 9/10 by GameSpot, which the latter site characterizes as "superb". PCMag gave the game a 4.0 out of 5 for iOS, stating that the touch controls can be "occasionally frustrating" and describing the progression system as "annoying".

Shawn Walton for Pocket Gamer rated the game 5 out of 5 stars, stating that a game is fast and hectic as Rocket League, and called it an "impressive" feat by the developers. Giovanni Colantonio at Digital Trends stated that Sideswipe is "a perfect lazy day game".

Sideswipe was the most downloaded mobile game in December 2021.
