= ARC Squadron =

2012 video game

- Developer(s): Psyonix
- Publisher(s): Psyonix
- Engine: Unreal Engine 3
- Platform(s): iOS, Android
- Release: iOS; 1 November 2012; ARC Squadron Redux; 17 October 2013
- Genre(s): Space combat
- Mode(s): Single-player

ARC Squadron is a 2012 space combat video game developed and published by Psyonix Studios for iOS. It was released on the App Store on 1 November 2012. Like Psyonix's previous game, Supersonic Acrobatic Rocket-Powered Battle-Cars, ARC Squadron runs on Unreal Engine 3. On 17 October 2013, ARC Squadron: Redux was released on iOS and Android, featuring improved graphics and performance as well as gameplay tweaks.

== Gameplay ==
=== Combat ===
The player has just earned a "x2" score multiplier.

Players control a weaponized space ship by swiping one finger on the touchscreen to maneuver the ship and perform barrel rolls. Each ship has two methods of eliminating enemies: "Primary Weapon" (a pair of lasers that fire automatically when the ship's crosshairs are lined up with an enemy), and a "Secondary Weapon" (activated by tapping the screen, and requiring time to recharge). Neutralizing targets in quick succession builds a combo multiplier that rewards the player with bonus points. Additionally, chains of cubes appear on the battlefield, and if all are collected, they too add bonus points, adding to the player's total score.

In addition to the main combat missions, there are also bonus levels, called "Wormholes", which contain challenges ranging from shooting concentric targets to dodging obstacles. Spread throughout the combat missions and Wormholes are nine boss battles. After each level, the player's score is totaled, rated from zero to four stars, and subsequently awarded a sum of "ARC Bucks" based upon the score and star rating. High scores can be uploaded to Game Center leader boards, and the game also includes a variety of achievements on Game Center.

=== The Hangar ===
After each mission, the player returns to the "Hangar", a central hub from which ARC Bucks can be used to purchase new ships, weapons, and skins, or upgrade existing equipment. In total, there are six ships and ten weapons, as well as twelve unlockable skins for each ship. Additional ARC Bucks can be bought with real money through in-app purchases, although everything in the game can eventually be unlocked by playing through the story missions.

== Reception ==
Reception

Aggregate score
| Aggregator | Score |
|---|---|
| Metacritic | 87/100 |

Review scores
| Publication | Score |
|---|---|
| Gamezebo | 4.5/5 stars |
| IGN | 7.3/10 |
| Jeuxvideo.com | 18/20 |
| Pocket Gamer | 4/5 stars |
| TouchArcade | 5/5 stars |
| Digital Spy | 5/5 stars |

ARC Squadron received "generally favourable reviews" according to the review aggregation website Metacritic. Critics praised the game for its excellent visuals and fast-paced, arcade-style gameplay, with many comparing it favorably to the likes of the Star Fox games.

IGN's Cody Musser was critical of the controls, but praised the graphics and the depth of the game, arguing that "ARC Squadron's controls hold it back from true greatness. But Psyonix has still created a compelling and gorgeous 3D space shooter worthy of your time and money. The ridiculous amount of content, large degree of variety and finely-tuned challenge will keep you glued to your mobile device's screen."

AppSpy.com's Andrew Nesvadba criticised the lack of story, but, like IGN, praised the graphics and the depth: "ARC Squadron is a solid shoot 'em up in the vein of greats like Star Fox, but streamlined to suit the platform's larger casual audience." Modojo's Chris Buffa also criticised the lack of a plot and the implementation of the secondary weapon, but concluded that "these small complaints aside, ARC Squadron satisfies with a combination of gorgeous imagery and intense, arcade-style gameplay." Matt Wales of Pocket Gamer felt that the touch controls were unresponsive at times, but still called the game "a satisfying blast of colourful, creative on-rails shooting that's only slightly let down by an occasional lack of responsiveness in its controls."

Blake Grundman of 148Apps was more impressed, saying, "not very often does a newcomer impress quite to the level that ARC Squadron has. The visual polish, overabundance of content, and addictive gameplay all meld together into a product that even Fox McCloud would be happy to have bear his name." Gamezebo's Jillian Werner criticised the difficulty, but praised the "gorgeous graphics, upbeat music, and fantastic level design. One-touch controls are executed superbly in both maneuvering and shooting. Tons of upgrades for your ship and weapons, all of which are affordable without shelling out real money. The entire game feels polished and lovingly crafted, from start to finish." TouchGen's Nigel Wood said, "ARC Squadron is easily one of the best shooters on the App Store right now. It has a strong Triple-A feel to it that only a few games have so far accomplished [...] The graphics, sound, controls, ramping difficulty, ship and weapons upgrades, and the awesome bosses makes for an addictive mix that's hard to put down."

Digital Spy's Scott Nichols said, "in many ways, Arc Squadron is a better sequel to Star Fox 64 than the official games that followed it, making it a must-have for mobile space combat fans." Eric Carlson of Slide to Play argued that the game was one of the best games on the App Store: "Arc Squadron is a revelation. It's a game that truly exemplifies what can really be done on iOS if you're willing to push the devices. We didn't even mention the absolutely gorgeous graphics, which are some of the very best we've ever seen on iOS. And if we didn't mention the spectacular visuals, then you know the actual gameplay has got to be amazing. This is one of the best, most refined gaming experiences you'll ever have on your little phone or iPad. Arc Squadron is a Must Have for everyone."

G4TV awarded ARC Squadron "Game of the Week" for the week of 9 November, and Kotaku featured the game as its "Gaming App of the Day."
