= Monster Madness: Grave Danger =

2008 video game

- Developer: Psyonix
- Publisher: SouthPeak Games
- Engine: Unreal Engine 3
- Platforms: PlayStation 3, Android
- Release: PlayStation 3: NA: August 5, 2008; EU: September 5, 2008; Android: WW: February 25, 2011
- Genre: Shoot 'em up
- Modes: Single-player, multiplayer

Monster Madness: Grave Danger is a 2008 video game developed by Psyonix and published by SouthPeak Games for the PlayStation 3. It is a rework of 2007's Monster Madness: Battle for Suburbia and adds 25 new challenges in the challenge mode, four-player online co-op for the adventure mode, reworking the control scheme, adding 100 character-specific purchasable accessories, new unlockable character costumes, and changing the camera system. While Battle for Suburbia was originally developed by Artificial Studios, publisher SouthPeak Games brought the title to Psyonix to rework the core gameplay and port the game to the PlayStation 3. An Android port of Grave Danger, developed by War Drum Studios, was released on February 25, 2011.

== Gameplay ==
=== Story mode ===
Like in Battle for Suburbia, Grave Danger allows players to create weapons to destroy the monsters that attack the town of Suburbia. There are five chapters: Suburban Nightmare, Shopping Maul, High School Hell, Cemetery Scary, and Evil Castle. Each chapter contains 3 to 5 stages.

The game features four playable characters, each armed with unique weapons and special moves. Zack is the nerd character and his special weapons are ax-type weapons. Andy is a skater who wields random objects such as a toilet plunger and rolling pin. Carrie is a goth girl who favors swords. Jennifer is a stuck-up cheerleader who wields dual batons.

While many items in the game can be picked up and used as melee weapons and throwable items, the main focus is on the character's signature melee weapon and the various buildable and upgradeable guns. Each character has a class of melee weapons that they feel most comfortable with. By using their favored weapon, a meter will begin to fill up as they kill enemies. When the meter reaches full charge, the players can unleash a special power attack that is unique to each character.

In addition to the melee weapons, there are 15 different guns that can be built using 18 different weapon parts, with each determining the weapon's play style. The weapon parts are collected by locating and opening weapon part tool chests which are hidden throughout the levels. This is another point where Grave Danger differs from Battle for Suburbia; where weapon parts were then randomly generated all around the levels, they are now contained in set locations inside the tool chests.

There are also features such as online play competitive play with up to 16 players, and costumes for all players that can be unlocked during or after the game is complete. Grave Danger also includes full online co-op capabilities, letting 4 players join and play through the adventure mode with other players on the internet.

=== Challenge modes ===
This mode of gameplay features 25 new minigames which the players must complete to unlock costumes for the characters. The minigames include such "Zombie Cats", where players must see how many zombie cats they can wipe out in a given amount of time using only the flamethrower. Another one of the minigames has players driving the game's UFO vehicle from a top-down perspective to destroy enemies. Other challenge modes include defeating a certain number of monsters in a given time limit - similar to adventure mode play - various vehicle races, and more.

== Development ==
With much of the feedback and criticism of Battle for Suburbia coming from the control scheme (referred to as "counter-intuitive and overly complicated for a simple overhead shooter") and camera systems, Psyonix and SouthPeak Games made these two of the main issues addressed in Grave Danger. In addition to the new controls and camera system, there is four-player online co-op mode added, allowing players to play through the adventure mode of the game with other users across the internet.

== Reception ==
Reception

Aggregate score
| Aggregator | Score |
|---|---|
| Metacritic | 55/100 |

Review scores
| Publication | Score |
|---|---|
| 1Up.com | D− |
| Game Informer | 7.25/10 |
| GameSpot | 5/10 |
| GameZone | 5.9/10 |
| IGN | 5.2/10 |
| PlayStation Official Magazine – UK | 5/10 |
| Play | 78% |
| PlayStation: The Official Magazine | 3/5 |
| PSM3 | 38% |
| VideoGamer.com | 5/10 |

The game received "mixed" reviews according to the review aggregation website Metacritic.
