= Artificial Studios =

American video game developer

- Type: Video game developer
- Industry: Video games
- Founded: 2001
- Defunct: January 12, 2011
- Headquarters: Gainesville, Florida, U.S.
- Key people: Tim Johnson (Founder, Technical Director), Jeremy Stieglitz (Founder, Project Director)

Artificial Studios was an American video game and game engine developer founded in 2001.

== History ==
Artificial Studios first came to attention with their "Reality Engine", unveiled in 2004, a solution for games using next-generation DirectX9-powered graphics. (This is one of several "next-gen" engines, see game engines.)

All of the Reality Engine intellectual property was purchased by Epic Games in 2005, and Artificial Studios co-founder and lead engine programmer, Tim Johnson, was also hired by Epic as part of the deal. All development on Reality Engine ceased and all Reality Engine licensees were encouraged to upgrade to Unreal Engine 3.

In 2006, Artificial Studios released CellFactor: Combat Training, then CellFactor: Revolution, a free downloadable game (of which a demo was released in May 2006) designed to show off the capabilities of the AGEIA PhysX game physics acceleration chipset. The game used Artificial Studio's own Reality Engine technology. The full game was released for free on May 8, 2007.

In 2007, Artificial Studios released Monster Madness: Battle for Suburbia, published by SouthPeak Games for the Xbox 360 and PC as their flagship title. The Monster Madness franchise was continued in 2008, by new developers, with Monster Madness: Grave Danger.

In 2008, Artificial Studios acquired funding for their unannounced title, codename "R6", from publisher Ignition Entertainment. A new studio was established, Ignition Entertainment: Florida, for development of this project. The studio had approximately 70 employees and the title was rumored for a "late 2009" release. The project was cancelled in 2010 and the studio was abruptly closed.
