= Rocket League =

2015 video game

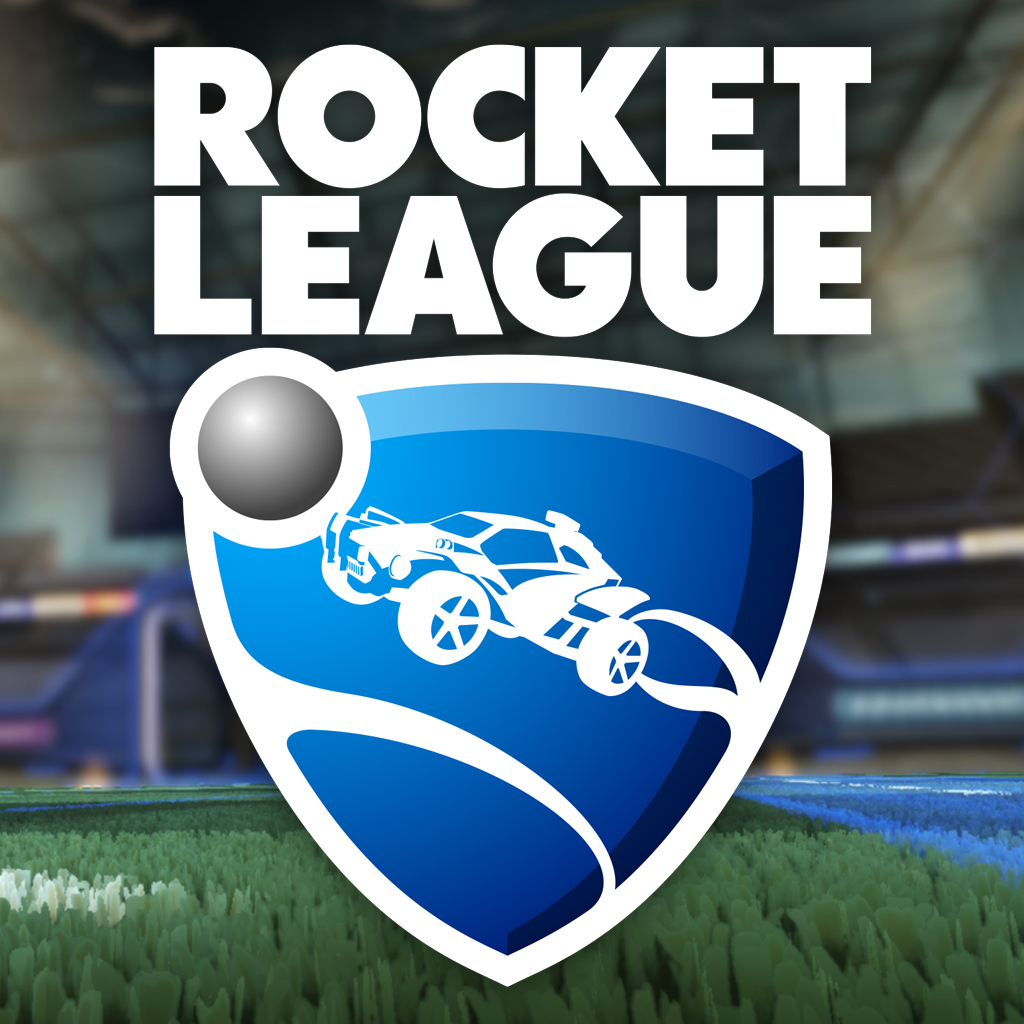
- Promotional cover art of the original release
- Developer: Psyonix (Note: Additional work for Nintendo Switch and Xbox One by Panic Button)
- Publisher: Psyonix (Note: Retail versions published by 505 Games (2016) and Warner Bros. Games (2016–2017).)
- Director: Thomas Silloway
- Producer: Sarah Hebbler
- Designer: Corey Davis
- Programmer: Jared Cone
- Artist: Bobby McCoin
- Composer: Mike Ault (Note: Additional compositions by Hollywood Principle, Christian De La Torre, and Abandoned Carnival)
- Engine: Unreal Engine 3
- Platforms: PlayStation 4; Windows; Xbox One; macOS (Note: The macOS and Linux versions stopped supporting online features in March 2020.); Linux; Nintendo Switch
- Release: July 7, 2015: PlayStation 4, Windows; July 7, 2015; Xbox One; February 17, 2016; macOS, Linux; September 8, 2016; Nintendo Switch; November 14, 2017
- Genre: Sports
- Modes: Single-player, multiplayer

Rocket League is a 2015 vehicular soccer video game developed and published by Psyonix. A sequel to 2008's Supersonic Acrobatic Rocket-Powered Battle-Cars, Rocket League features up to eight players assigned to each of the two teams, using "rocket-powered" vehicles to hit a ball into their opponent's goal and score points over the course of a match. The game includes single-player and multiplayer modes that can be played both locally and online, including cross-platform play between all versions.

Psyonix began formal development of Rocket League around 2013, refining the gameplay from Battle-Cars to address criticism and fan input. Psyonix also recognized their lack of marketing from Battle-Cars and engaged in both social media and promotions to market the game. Rocket League was first released on the PlayStation 4 and Windows respectively in July 2015, with ports for Xbox One and Nintendo Switch being released later on. Physical retail versions for PlayStation 4 and Xbox One were distributed starting in 2016 by 505 Games and later by Warner Bros. Interactive Entertainment. Versions for macOS and Linux were also released in 2016, but support for their online services was dropped in 2020. Rocket League is developed under the games as a service model; later updates for the game enabled the ability to modify core rules and added new game modes, including ones based on ice hockey, gridiron football and basketball. It has been offered as free-to-play since 2020 when Epic Games acquired Psyonix.

Rocket League was praised for its gameplay improvements over Supersonic Acrobatic Rocket Powered Battle-Cars, as well as its graphics and overall presentation, although some criticism was directed towards the game's physics engine. It has since been considered one of the greatest video games ever made. The game earned many industry awards and saw over 10 million sales and 40 million players by the beginning of 2018. Rocket League has also been adopted as an esport, with professional players participating through ESL and Major League Gaming along with Psyonix's own Rocket League Championship Series (RLCS).

== Gameplay ==
Gameplay in Rocket League, where players aim to hit the ball into the opposing team's goal using their rocket-powered cars

Rocket League's gameplay is largely the same as that of its predecessor, Supersonic Acrobatic Rocket-Powered Battle-Cars. Players control a rocket-powered car and use it to hit a ball that is much larger than the cars towards the other team's goal area to score goals, in a way that resembles indoor soccer, with elements reminiscent of a demolition derby. Players' cars have the ability to hop to hit the ball while in mid-air. Updates in 2024 introduced new features that allow players to view the remaining boost amount of their teammates, and how much time was remaining on the game clock when specific comments were made in the chat.

Matches are usually five minutes long, with a sudden death overtime if the game is tied at that point. Matches can be played from between one-on-one up to four-on-four players, as well as in casual and ranked playlists. The latter serves as Rocket League's competitive online mode, where players compete in various tiered ranks within game seasons, with victories or losses raising or lowering a player's rank, respectively. The game includes a single-player Season mode, with the player competing with computer-controlled players. An update in December 2016 introduced Custom Training sequences that can be created by players and shared with others on the same platform. Players are able to specify the ball's path and the presence and skill of opponents on the field, which enables them to practice specific shots or maneuvers.

A few months after it was released, Psyonix released an update that added game modes known as mutators, modifying some aspects of gameplay, such as increased or decreased gravity, ball size, ball speed and bounciness. For the 2015 holiday season, another update replaced mutator matches with an ice hockey-inspired mode (called Snow Day), played on an ice rink and the ball replaced with a hockey puck with different physics. Positive reception to the ice hockey mode led to it being extended for a few weeks after the holiday season. Snow Day was permanently added to the mutator settings for private matches and exhibition games on February 10, 2016. Hoops, a game mode based on basketball, was added on April 25, 2016. A separate Rumble mode, which incorporates unusual power-ups, such as the ability to freeze the ball in place or cause a single opponent to have difficulty controlling their car, was added on September 8, 2016. An update in December 2016, known as Starbase ARC and based on Psyonix' mobile game ARC Squadron, added support for custom arenas for Windows players supported through Steam Workshop, along with other new content.

A new game mode, Dropshot, was added in a March 2017 update. It takes place in an arena without any goals and a field made of hexagonal tiles, and uses a ball that becomes increasingly electrified after successful strikes or passes. The more the ball is struck by players without touching the ground the more electrified it becomes, and the more tiles it damages once it finally does hit the ground. The goal of the mode is to damage the opponent's floor enough to break a hole into it, allowing the ball to drop through and score. When a team scores, the floor on the opponent's side of the field resets to normal, while the floor on the scoring team's side retains any existing damage.

Psyonix also released a number of limited-time modes for the game. Spike Rush, released as part of the Radical Summer event in 2019, resembles rugby. The spikes power-up will attach the ball to a player's vehicle once it is touched. Players must avoid contacting any opposing player as it results in instant demolition. In celebration of Super Bowl LV in February 2021, Psyonix released a limited time gamemode called Gridiron, which functions similar to gridiron football with the normal soccer ball being replaced by a football. A new game mode was added called Knockout was added in 2022. It is played Free-For-All, without teams, in a set of newly added arenas that have no goals. The object of the mode is to knock opponents into Hazards, features that destroy the player on contact, in order to take away one of three lives. This can be achieved using the three actions the player can take, Attack, Block, and Grab, operating similarly to Rock, Paper, and Scissors respectively in Rock Paper Scissors. After a 6 minutes, if a winner has not yet been decided by being the only remaining player with one or more lives, the match enters Sudden KO mode, where all actions are much more powerful and exiting a safe zone around the map removes a life.

As part of a means to monetize the game beyond downloadable content, Psyonix has tried a few different approaches. In September 2016, it introduced a loot box system known as Crates, where players could purchase them with a random selection of in-game customization items, opened through the purchase of Keys using real-world funds. Due to increasing governmental concern over loot boxes, Psyonix replaced the Crates system with Blueprints in December 2019, which offer a known specific item with potential modifiers as potential end-of-match drops. These Blueprints can then be crafted using the game's new premium currency (Credits), or purchased with real-world funds, if the player so chooses. A new rotating Item Shop was introduced in December 2019 as well, with Featured items available on a 48-hour timer and Daily items on a 24-hour timer. The Item Shop includes all types of in-game items, such as Painted Cars, Exotic Wheels, Goal Explosions, and many more. Each item has a listed Credit value that will show the item's cost, allowing players to purchase the exact item they want, instead of relying on RNG to attain a specific item previously available through loot boxes. Separately, Psyonix added a battle pass feature to the game in September 2018, known as the Rocket Pass. Each pass, which lasts a few months, has challenges and other opportunities through playing Rocket League that allow players to increase the tier of the Pass, from which new unique customization options tied to that pass can be unlocked. While the Rocket Pass is free to all players, a flat-cost premium option that accelerates the level up rate and unlocks additional items at certain tier levels can be purchased.

== Development ==
Psyonix's Supersonic Acrobatic Rocket-Powered Battle-Cars (left) immediately preceded and inspired the development of Rocket League (right), which would make vast improvements upon Battle-Cars' gameplay and online features.

Psyonix had previously developed Supersonic Acrobatic Rocket-Powered Battle-Cars in 2008 for the PlayStation 3. That game itself bore out from previous modifications that Psyonix' founder, Dave Hagewood, had done for Unreal Tournament 2003 by expanding out vehicle-based gameplay that Epic Games had already set in place in the engine into a new game mode called Onslaught. For this, Hagewood was hired as a contractor by Epic for Unreal Tournament 2004 specifically for incorporating the Onslaught mode as an official part of the game. Hagewood used his experience at Epic to found Psyonix. Among other contract projects, Psyonix worked to try to find a way to make racing the Unreal vehicles in a physics-based engine enjoyable. They had toyed with several options such as race modes or mazes, but found that when they added a ball to the arena to be pushed by the vehicles, they had hit upon the right formula, which would become Battle-Cars. Further to the success was the addition of the rocket-powered cars; this originally was to be a simple speed boost, but with the physics engine, they were able to have the vehicles fly off and around the arena, furthering the possibilities for gameplay.

As Psyonix finished development of Battle-Cars, the studio had tried to gain access to a publisher by selling their game as "soccer, but with rocket-powered cars"; none of the publishers seemed interested. Ultimately, they opted to self-publish the game on the PlayStation Network with almost no marketing. Though it was downloaded more than two million times, it was not considered very successful even after the studio cut the price. The studio continued on to other projects, though kept the idea of building on Battle-Cars as an option, recognizing the game had a small but dedicated fan-base that provided them with ideas for expansion. These other projects, which including contract work for AAA games, including Mass Effect 3, helped to fund the development of Rocket League.

Full development of Rocket League started around 2013 and took around two years and under $2 million to develop, though they had tested various prototypes of a Battle-Cars sequel in the years prior, including an unsuccessful attempt at pitching the game's idea to Electronic Arts in 2011. Psyonix used some of the feedback from Battle-Cars to fine-tune the gameplay in Rocket League. A key requirement for Psyonix was to increase the game's frame rate from 30 to 60 frames-per-second, a known criticism from Battle-Cars and essential for newer hardware, according to Corey Davis, the design director at Psyonix. Hagewood recognized that Battle-Cars was considered "too hardcore" with the game becoming too inaccessible to novice players against skilled ones. They eased up on some aspects to make it more approachable, such as by slowing the pace of the game and allowing players of all skill levels to reasonably compete against each other while promoting team-based gameplay. Though they tried to add elements like power-ups, they found these to be too distracting to gameplay. They also explored other changes such as making the game more gritty, akin to Monday Night Combat, developing several mini-games related to handling of the car, working on making the graphics give a sense of scale to the players to give the impression they were controlling full-sized vehicles rather than radio-controlled cars, and creating an open world structure where the player would drive between stadium and stadium to participate in matches. Instead, the team opted to strip the game to its core, focusing on more visual elements to enhance the title. From Battle-Cars, Psyonix recognized very few players actually went online, and developed Rocket League's single-player season mode to encourage players to try online matches once they completed it.

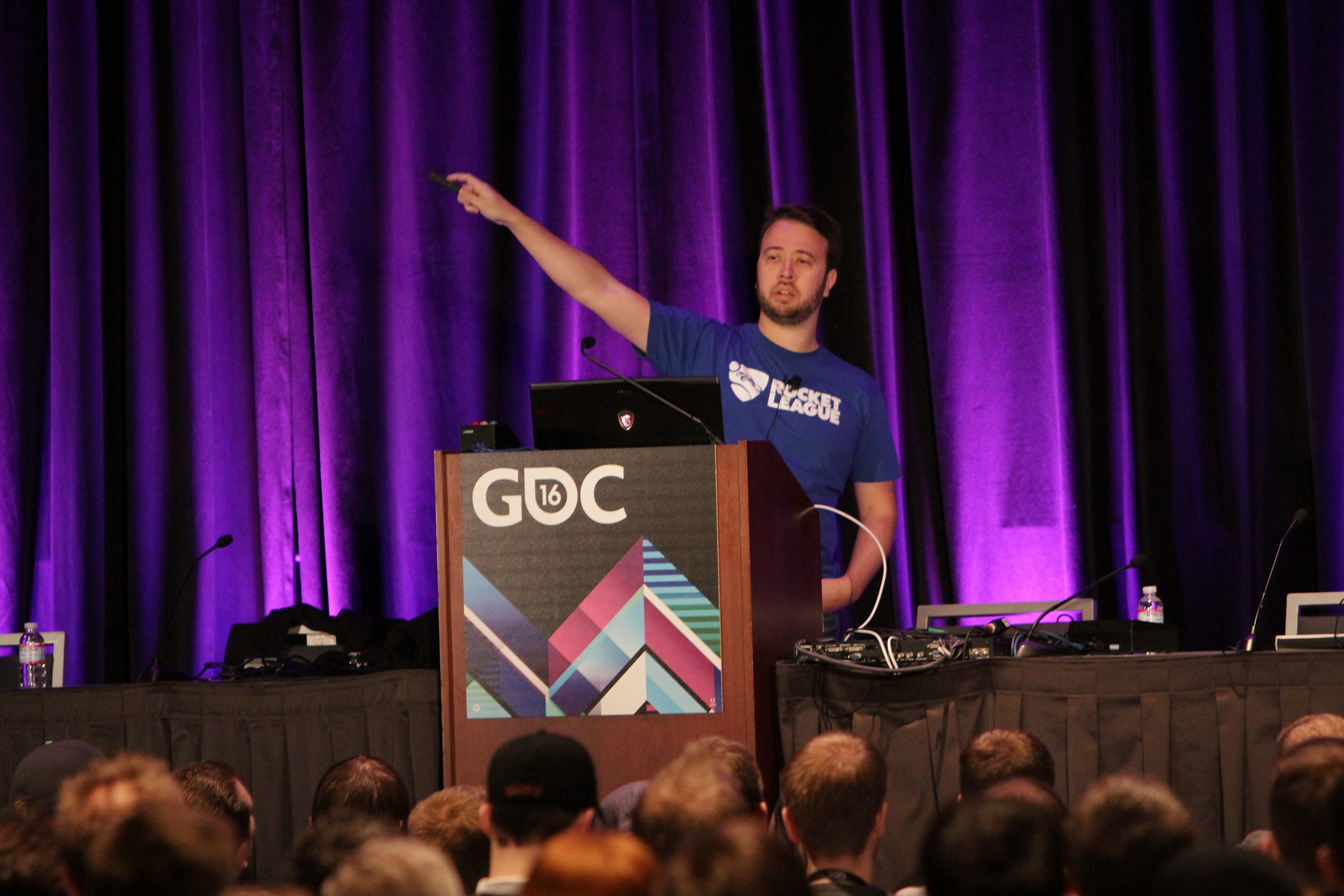
Corey Davis, Rocket League's design manager, giving a presentation at GDC 2016

Psyonix's team were aware of past difficulties that they had with Battle-Cars and other racing games with online play and client-side prediction, and the issues that would arise from that with Rocket League's fast-paced play style. To solve this, the physics in the game are based on using the Bullet physics engine within the Unreal Engine 3's PhysX engine, which tracks the movement of all the cars and actors, allowing them to periodically re-synchronize the game state across players based on the stored physics states, which enabled players to have quick reactions from their client. At the time of Battle-Cars, Psyonix could not afford a dedicated server network and were forced to rely on individual hosts, which could lead to poor performance with slow Internet connections. With Rocket League, Psyonix was able to put a dedicated server network in place, writing their own service protocols to interface with Sony's and Valve's online services so as to enable cross-platform play, as well as improving matchmaking capabilities. Psyonix's previous experience in contract work for AAA games had exposed them to the larger developers' approach to release and quality control, and they were able to apply those principles and aim for the same level of quality requirements in the final release of Rocket League.

Psyonix had at one point considered having Rocket League as a free-to-play game with microtransactions, inspired by Team Fortress 2 and Dota 2's models. Though they had put in efforts to establish a free-to-play model, Psyonix decided instead to switch to a traditional sale method, and offer only cosmetic elements as downloadable content, assuring that no players would have any additional advantage beyond their own skill. The name Rocket League was selected in part to reduce the size of the game's title in order to appear fully in digital storefronts, and also served to be an easier to remember name as well as a more mature-sounding title than Battle-Cars, according to Hagewood; speaking on Rocket League's development in March 2016, Davis opined that Supersonic Acrobatic Rocket-Powered Battle-Cars was "the worst game name of all time".

=== Cross-platform play ===
Rocket League has been one of the leading games in supporting cross-platform play between personal computers and consoles. Jeremy Dunham, Psyonix's vice president of publishing, says cross-platform play helps establish a stable player base and avoid the snowball effect that can cause isolated player bases on individual platforms to wane, particularly in the transition from one console generation to the next. Though the Xbox One version lacked this feature at launch, Microsoft in March 2016 announced that Rocket League would be the first game in a new initiative they were taking to enable cross-play between Windows and Xbox One players who have Xbox Live accounts; this cross-platform play feature was added in an update in May 2016. Microsoft has stated that they offer other networks, such as Sony's PlayStation Network, the ability to integrate with Xbox Live to allow full cross-platform compatibility for games like Rocket League. Dunham noted that this cross-platform idea had been something they asked Microsoft about when Rocket League was set for an Xbox One release, but he stated that Microsoft did not seem to be on board with it. Only after they had neared the release date would Microsoft take the initiative to offer it as one for their new cross-play efforts and started working towards this possibility in the game.

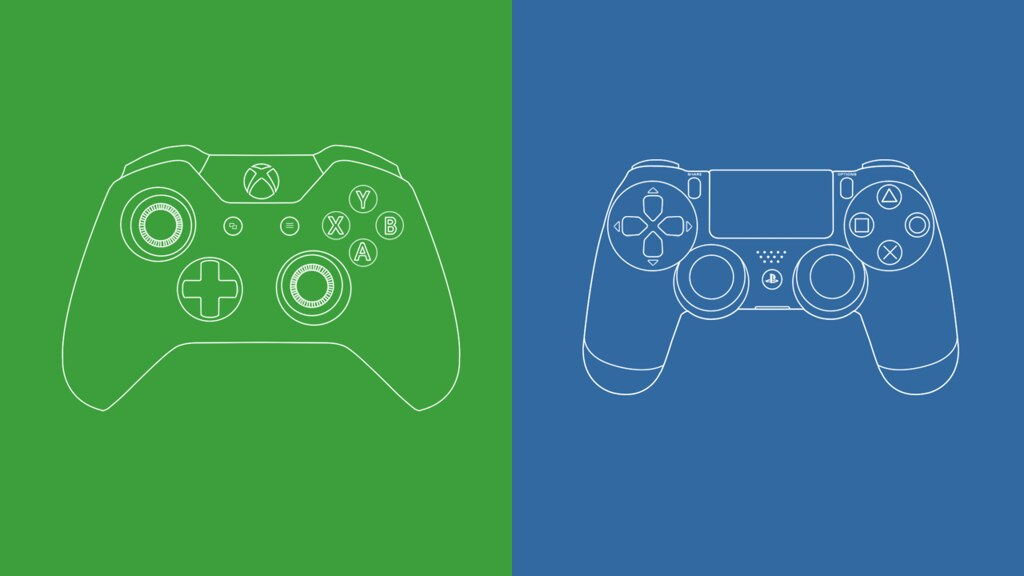
Crossplay platforms

Psyonix determined the required technical steps needed to enable cross-platform play and have tested it in closed environments, and were only waiting for the legalities of cross-connecting players between different networks before proceeding. this work also includes how they would be able to distribute updated content patches in a unified and more frequent manner to enable them to continue to expand the game for at least another 9 months. In a July 2016 interview with IGN, Dunham stated they had done all the technical work and could enable cross-platform play between the Xbox One and PlayStation 4 versions "within a few hours" of Sony's approval. As of March 2017, the company is ready to enable this feature, but was still waiting for the console manufacturers to come to the required agreements to allow it.

With the announcement of the Switch version, Psyonix affirmed that it would support cross-platform play with PC and Xbox users. Sony still opted not to participate in this; PlayStation global marketing head Jim Ryan said that while they are "open to conversations with any developer or publisher who wants to talk about it", their decision was "a commercial discussion between ourselves and other stakeholders". Dunham says that in contrast to Microsoft or Nintendo, who agreed to allow cross-platform play within a month and with the day of Psyonix' request, respectively, Sony has been asked on a nearly daily basis about this support and have yet to receive any definitive answer. The cross-platform party feature is planned for an update in early 2019. This will allow players to create in-game friend lists across platforms and play in matches with them. This is limited by the current cross-platform limitations: while Windows players can add friends from other Windows users and Xbox One, PlayStation 4, and Switch users, PlayStation 4 users are limited to Windows and PlayStation 4 users.

In September 2018, Sony had altered its position on cross-platform play following the release of Fortnite Battle Royale for the Nintendo Switch, where the lack of cross-platform play had been a point of significant criticism. Sony allowed Fortnite to be cross-platform play compatible with all platforms and stated they would review other games on a case-by-case basis. By January 2019, Psyonix announced that Sony had granted the same for Rocket League, allowing cross-platform play between the PlayStation 4, Xbox One, Switch, and PC versions in February 2019.

=== Downloadable content ===
The "Hoops" mode in Rocket League, one of the many updates to the game after its release, has players shoot the ball into a basket instead of a goal.

Psyonix planned to continue to support Rocket League with downloadable content (DLC), intending to keep all gameplay updates free and only charging for cosmetic items. In November 2015, a free update added the ability to Mutate a match, allowing for a number of different custom presets and match settings, including a low gravity mode and a cubed ball, among other improvements and additions. Through this, Psyonix is able to offer custom game playlists to test out new modes or for holiday-themed events. For example, during the latter part of December 2015, Psyonix introduced an ice hockey-based mutation alongside a special event featuring holiday-themed decorative items, replacing the normal ball with a hockey puck, and changing the floor to ice. This mode proved very popular and was permanently added to the standard playlists on February 24, 2016. In February 2016, a new game playlist called Rocket Labs was added to offer new experimental maps to players as a means to gauge feedback and interest in a map before adding it to the game's standard map playlist. In April 2016, the developers added the basketball-based playlist to the standard playlists. A new Rumble mode, which adds unique power-ups on various maps, was released in September 2016.

The game's first DLC pack, titled Supersonic Fury, was released in August 2015, along with new arena Utopia Coliseum. It contains exclusive cosmetics, including two new cars, rocket boosts, wheels, five paint finishes, and twelve decals for both new cars. The same month, it was announced that Rocket League would be ported to macOS and Linux later that year, in order to run natively with SteamOS hardware; Rocket League and Portal 2 were part of incentives for those that pre-ordered a Steam Link, a Steam Controller, or a Steam Machine. The game's second DLC pack, titled Revenge of the Battle-Cars, was released in October 2015. The DLC adds two more cars from Supersonic Acrobatic Rocket-Powered Battle-Cars, along with exclusive cosmetics for both. In another event, players had a chance to collect six Halloween-themed items from October 18 to November 2. The game's third DLC pack, titled Chaos Run, was released in December 2015. The DLC added two more cars, along with more cosmetics. A new arena, called "Wasteland", was released for free alongside the DLC. The map is notable for being the first non-standard arena to be released, having a different size and shape than the others and inspired by the Mad Max films, the first of which Psyonix plans to release over time.

In June 2016, a new arena, Neo Tokyo, based on the Rocket Labs layout Underpass, was added to the game via an update. The update also introduced cosmetic items awarded at the end of matches with various rarity grades, and gave players the ability to trade multiple items of the same type and rarity grade to obtain an item of a better rarity grade. Also included in the patch are a number of painted and certified items, the latter of which are cosmetic items with statistics-recording tags, and eight new achievements. Psyonix added the ability for players to trade items with other players within the "Rumble" update, including item and crate drop systems comparable to Team Fortress 2 and Counter-Strike: Global Offensive, in which players have the chance to gain locked crates from playing in competitive matches. Players are able to purchase keys to open these crates through microtransactions, revealing special decorative items for their cars. Players can opt-out of this feature to disable crate drops. Though items received in crates are tradable within the game, these items cannot be sold on the platform's respective marketplaces so as to prevent issues in the same vein as the Counter-Strike skin gambling controversy. The funds from microtransactions would be used to support the esports tournaments organized by Psyonix. In October 2016, a major update titled "Aquadome" launched, featuring a new arena placed under the sea, along with two new premium water-themed cars, and a new crate containing new items and seven new achievements.

Psyonix was able to make licensing agreements to include vehicles and decorative items from other franchises within the game. On launch, the PlayStation 4 version included Sweet Tooth's car from the Twisted Metal series. As a separate DLC, the DeLorean time machine from the Back to the Future film franchise, was released on October 21, 2015, corresponding with Back to the Future Day. The Xbox One release includes platform-exclusive Gears of War and Halo-themed vehicles. The Nintendo Switch version, meanwhile, received platform-exclusive cars inspired by Nintendo's Super Mario and Metroid series. The Batmobile, as seen in the 2016 film Batman v Superman: Dawn of Justice, was offered as a playable vehicle in March 2016, while Dominic Toretto's Dodge Charger from the film The Fate of the Furious was added to tie in with the film's release in April 2017. An update released in July 2017 introduced a new arena celebrating the one-year anniversary of the game, along with cosmetic items based on the American animated show Rick and Morty. Alongside the theatrical release of Jurassic World: Fallen Kingdom, Psyonix released Jurassic Park and Jurassic World-themed content, including a Jurassic Park-themed Jeep Wrangler car model. The game had collaborated with numerous franchise, including The Goonies, Karate Kid, E.T., and Star Wars.

In September 2015, Psyonix held a cross-promotion with Torn Banner Studios, adding two free new flags themed after Torn Banner's Chivalry: Medieval Warfare. At the same time the "Chaos Run" DLC was released, Psyonix added free cosmetics and accessories from the Portal series by Valve. Themed content based on Goat Simulator and Euro Truck Simulator were added to the game in April 2016 as part of cross-promotional deals with those games. Other themed promotional content includes decorative items based on The Witcher and Worms W.M.D. With the release of the basketball game mode in 2016, Psyonix partnered with the National Basketball Association (NBA), offering flags with all 30 NBA team logos as car customization items. In February 2017, two iconic Hot Wheels cars were added to the game, along with other cosmetic items based on the brand.

For the 2019 Radical Summer event, Psyonix released two new car packs; the Ecto-1 from the Ghostbusters film franchise in June, and the KITT from the 1980s television series Knight Rider in July. Psyonix had hoped to include KITT as early as 2016. For the 2019 Halloween event, cars and other cosmetics based on the television series Stranger Things were added. In May 2020, Psyonix introduced the Modes of May event, which included a number of limited-time game modes for every weekend of the month. The modes include Dropshot Rumble, Beach Ball, Boomer Ball, and Heatseeker, which features a curving ball that magnetizes toward both ends of the field, drawing comparisons to the 1972 table tennis sports game Pong.

=== Music ===
The original soundtrack for Rocket League was released both physically and digitally on July 1, 2015. It contains original compositions by Psyonix sound designer Mike Ault, as well as contributions by Ault's electronic music group, Hollywood Principle. New songs were added to the game with post-release updates, including "Chaos Run Theme" by Kevin Riepl, "Escape from LA (Instrumental)" by Abandoned Carnival and Ault, and a remix of Hollywood Principle's "Breathing Underwater" by Ether. These songs were later compiled in the second volume of the soundtrack, which was released on July 7, 2016. iam8bit published a three-disc vinyl version of the soundtrack, consisting of the above two volumes, in late 2016. The game's 2nd anniversary update included a musical content pack featuring releases from the EDM label Monstercat. The label have also released a series of standalone albums featuring the music, titled Rocket League x Monstercat.

=== Rocket League Sideswipe ===
Rocket League Sideswipe is a free mobile game spin-off by Psyonix released on Android and iOS in late 2021. The game was announced in March 2021 and replicates the gameplay of the original game, but in a two-dimensional space. Players compete in short 1-on-1 or 2-on-2 matches that are played online. They can also play volleyball, heatseeker, basketball or 3-on-3 matches.

=== Rocket Racing ===
On December 2, 2023, Psyonix teased Rocket Racing during the Fortnite Big Bang event as a spin-off title and was released as a game mode in Fortnite on December 8. It supports cross-game inventory for use in the Battle Royale modes with cosmetics related to cars.

== Release ==
Rocket League was officially announced as the sequel to Battle-Cars in February 2014. Building on the effects from the lack of marketing with Battle-Cars, Psyonix developed a different marketing approach to Rocket League. This included engaging with YouTube and Twitch video game streamers with early release copies to help spread the word, recognizing that clips from the game would be readily shared through social media. They also opened the game to early alpha and beta testing for several months following the game's announcement. Davis noted that they otherwise did not spend any money on traditional marketing approaches.

They had originally planned to release the game around November 2014, but had missed this deadline to implement better matchmaking and servers, high frame rates, and removing the free-to-play elements. The game was released publicly on July 7, 2015, for the PlayStation 4 and Windows. Davis considered this serendipitous, as this moved the game out from a busy period of many major releases during the holiday season to the relatively quiet mid-year period, reducing the amount of competition from other titles. Further, the game on release was made part of Instant Game Collection on the PlayStation 4 and free to PlayStation Plus subscribers; within the week, Psyonix had seen more than 183,000 unique players, exceeding their server capacity and requiring them to improve on their network code to handle the influx of players. Davis estimated there were six million downloads of the game from this promotion, and considered this the "best decision" they had ever made.

At The Game Awards 2015, it was announced that the game would be ported to Xbox One, where it was released on February 17, including most of the previous DLC packs for free. Ports for macOS and Linux were released on September 8, 2016. A retail version of Rocket League, in form of the game's Collector's Edition, was announced in February 2016, and was released in Europe on June 24, 2016, and in North America on July 5, 2016. The Collector's Edition is published and distributed by 505 Games, and includes the first three downloadable content packs for free, as well as four additional cars to be available as digital download on July 18: Aftershock and Marauder (both from Supersonic Acrobatic Rocket-Powered Battle-Cars), as well as Esper and Masamune. In October 2017, Psyonix announced that Warner Bros. Interactive Entertainment would begin to publish an updated version of the game for PlayStation 4 and Xbox One consoles by the end of that year, which includes additional content for both versions.

The PlayStation 4 version was patched in February 2017 to offer PlayStation 4 Pro support, allowing for 4K resolution and constant 60 frames-per-second rendering at 1080p for one and two-player split-screen players; three and four-player split screen will render up to 60 frames-per-second when possible. Similar rendering improvements were also made to the standard PlayStation 4 to approach constant 60 frames-per-second for most arenas and modes.

After reviewing the feasibility of doing so, Psyonix announced that Rocket League would also be released for the Nintendo Switch, as revealed during Nintendo's press conference during E3 2017. It was released later that year on November 14, and includes customization options based on Nintendo properties, including Mario, Luigi, and Metroid-inspired car designs, and supports cross-platform play with the PC and Xbox One versions. Due to the Switch's lack of natural support for Unreal Engine 3, some compromises had to be made in the porting process, such as by reducing the graphical quality to 720p. Despite having to do custom work to make the game run smoothly on the Switch, Dunham was impressed with the work that had been done before release.

Austin, Texas-based studio Panic Button assisted Psyonix with the Xbox One and Nintendo Switch ports, and graphical updates to support the PlayStation 4 Pro. In April 2017, Psyonix announced that they had partnered with Tencent to bring a free-to-play version of Rocket League to the Chinese gaming market, with users able to purchase cosmetic items through microtransactions. It was successfully licensed through China's approval process in July 2019. Because of the continued growth of the game's player base, Psyonix's Dunham said they do not anticipate creating any sequel to the game, and instead are expecting to continue to add new features to the game over several years' time, calling this an "infinite support window". A small team within Psyonix was set up to explore new features and gameplay ideas to continue to expand Rocket League.

In May 2019, Epic Games announced that it had acquired Psyonix for an undisclosed amount. Psyonix has had a long-standing relationship with the studio (its original North Carolina headquarters were only 12 miles (19 km) away from those of Epic), having worked with it on development tools for the Unreal Engine. As a result of the purchase, the game was planned to be added to the Epic Games Store by late-2019, but Psyonix was unclear over whether the game would become exclusive to the store. The game became subject to review bombing on Steam due to this sale, triggering Steam's "off-topic review activity" system, which hides reviews that do not correlate with the game itself.

Psyonix announced in January 2020 that as part of a major upgrade to the base game systems, they would be dropping support for macOS and Linux from the game by March 2020. After March 2020, these versions will no longer be able to connect and use the online parts of the game, but can still be played in single player or local multiplayer. Psyonix said in a followup message that macOS and Linux players represented less than 0.3% of the total player base and could not justify keeping these as supported platforms as they advanced the other platforms to newer technology, such as moving the Windows version from DirectX 9 to 11. The developer offered full refunds to the game for macOS and Linux owners regardless of how long they had the game.

=== Cross-promotions ===
Psyonix teamed with Internal Drive to provide Rocket League as part of the latter's iD Tech summer educational camps for children, using the game for both recreation and for teaching elements of game design. In 2017, the game served as a sponsor of WWE pay-per-view events, such as Backlash, Great Balls of Fire, and SummerSlam. The following year, the companies announced a further partnership, with WWE cosmetic items introduced to the game in April.

Psyonix partnered with Zag Toys to produce a series of pullback toy cars based on the Rocket League vehicles, which released in June 2017. Some of these included a redeemable code that can be used within the game for unique customization items. The developers also filmed television advertisements for Rocket League that started airing the same month. Alongside these ads, Psyonix offered free copies of Rocket League alongside purchase of selected Nvidia graphics cards. In December 2018, toy car brand Hot Wheels released a radio-controlled car (RC car) game set based on the game that features two RC cars that are controlled through Bluetooth devices, a play field, a ball containing infrared sensors for scoring purposes, and charging devices.

In February 2022, there was announced a partnership between 7-Eleven and Psyonix, with Slurpee themed Rocket League cosmetics able to be purchased by players in-game, and Rocket League themed items being sold inside 7-Eleven stores and some subsidiaries. 7-Eleven was also an official sponsor of the RLCS, and an event was named after the brand, the "7‑Eleven Slurpee Cup." A sweepstakes was offered by 7-Eleven to win a real life vehicle, the "Model 711."

=== Free-to-play transition ===
Psyonix transitioned Rocket League to a free-to-play model on all platforms on September 23, 2020. Associated with the transition, the game added cross-platform progression that covers the cosmetic items players have earned, new competitive tournaments at each rank to earn rewards, new challenges, and other features. The free-to-play version eliminated the need for players to have console subscription services like PlayStation Plus or Nintendo Switch Online to be able to play. Some changes were also made to the game's tournaments and challenge systems to help with monetization. Players that had purchased the game prior to the transition were given "Legacy" status and some related cosmetic items. One day after the game became free-to-play, it reached a peak concurrent player count on more than 1 million players.

As part of this transition, the Windows version of the game was moved off Steam onto the Epic Games Store. Players that had already owned the Steam version prior to the change were still able to download, update the game and play it with cross-play with other platforms, and would continue to receive updates.

=== Removal of player trading ===
In December 2023, Psyonix removed player-to-player trading. This change was made to align Rocket League's cosmetic and item shop policies with Epic's standards, and to enable the possibility of cross-game ownership of Rocket League vehicles in other Epic Games titles.

== Esports ==
Psyonix had observed the popularity of Rocket League matches on Twitch and other live streaming platforms, and in February 2016, were looking to use the game more in esports. In March 2016, Psyonix announced the first Rocket League Championship Series (RLCS); the finals took place in August 2016 with a $55,000 prize pool. More than $1 million in revenues from the sale of in-game crates and cosmetic items were used to fund additional competitive events throughout the year, including smaller competitions at major gaming conventions and support for community-run competitive events.

Soon after release, Rocket League became an officially sponsored esport, joining ESL. In September 2015, Major League Gaming (MLG) announced the first season of the Pro Rocket League, which was held in September through early October. A $75,000 Rocket League tournament was held outside U.S. Bank Stadium at the Summer X Games in July 2017, with the finals streamed live on ESPN3. NRG Esports claimed their first live Rocket League championship by winning the tournament, defeating Gale Force eSports in the final. As NBC's first foray into esports, NBC Sports Group, in conjunction with Faceit, ran its own $100,000-prize pool tournament which was broadcast across its eight worldwide regions in July–August 2017. Starting in September 2017, Psyonix and Tespa, a collegiate esports organizer, held the first collegiate tournament for teams to win a share of $50,000 in scholarships. In December 2017, Turner Sports organized a US$150,000 ELEAGUE Cup event for eight teams was broadcast live on streaming media, with a three-part series of shows detailing some of the teams' path to the Cup and some of the match results, which aired on TBS later in the month.

The 2020s brought significant changes to Rocket League esports. RLCS Season X would bring the addition of a new competitive format which featured 3 separate regional splits, each one having their own international Majors, followed by the season-ending World Championship. Teams were awarded points based on how they placed in the regional events which qualified them for the World Championship While the Season X World Championship was cancelled due to the COVID-19 pandemic, this format stayed the same for the 2021–22 and 2022–23 seasons. For 2024, this would change to two regional splits, each one having their own international Major at the end, followed by the World Championship. This would be kept for the 2025 season, but Last Chance Qualifiers for the World Championship for the 4 best regions, Play-ins for the World Championship and a 1v1 series were added. Also in 2024, the FIFAe World Cup, organized by FIFA and previously utilizing the FIFA soccer series, would feature a national team focused Rocket League tournament. This was due to EA Sports, who had developed the FIFA games, ending their decades-long ties with soccer's governing body.

== Reception ==
Reception

Aggregate score
Aggregator	Score
Metacritic	(XONE) 87/100 (PS4) 85/100 (PC) 86/100 (NS) 86/100

Review scores
Publication	Score
GameSpot	9/10
IGN	9.3/10
PC Gamer (US)	87/100
Polygon	9/10
VideoGamer.com	7/10
Shacknews	8/10

Rocket League has received "generally favorable" reviews on all platforms, according to review aggregator website Metacritic. Positive feedback was aimed towards the game's multiplayer gameplay, and its graphics and visuals, especially in comparison to Battle-Cars; later reviews praised the player experience in the game. Criticism was mostly aimed at the game's physics engine, though a consensus on the topic has been mostly unclear, with some defending the engine.

In a review of Rocket League's beta preview, Ozzie Mejia of Shacknews praised Psyonix's approach to updating Battle-Cars using the PlayStation 4's hardware, describing the graphics as "brilliantly detailed" and "crisp", and citing its consistent frame rates throughout. Robert Summa of Destructoid shared Mejia's view that the game was "fun option for anyone looking to mix their racing and sports games together", himself describing that the game was "addictive and fun as hell." Reviewers from Polygon, PlayStation Universe, and Videogamer.com shared positive views towards multiplayer gameplay in Rocket League. Ben Kuchera of Polygon wrote that the game "introduces a well-known concept and then adds a complication." Kuchera asserted that the game's physics were "internally consistent", and summarized his experience with the game as "joyful" and rewarding in its progression. The game's physics engine continued to be a point of contention in later reviews, including Steven Burns' review for Videogamer.com, in which he shared his opinion that the speed of the ball should have been increased in certain modes to compensate for the "floaty" physics. Neil Bolt of PlayStation Universe shared a similar view, writing that the physics "causes frustration in 4v4 bouts where everyone ends up huddling under the slow-descending ball for long periods."

"... the physics, floaty as they are, not really suited to seeing the ball constantly being punted about: it can often feel like chasing a balloon around a children's party, but the children are in high-powered rocket cars and are taking no shit. ... you feel Psyonix would be better off making the ball move just a tad faster: often you'll crash into it at speed only to see your car move quicker than it after collision."

— Steven Burns

In a review for PC Gamer, Matt Elliott defended the physics engine, citing the "[nice] contrast" between the fast player-controlled cars and the slower-moving ball, colorfully describing that the ball "gormlessly invites impact like a punchable cousin." Elliott also wrote positively of the multiplayer gameplay, comparing the "destruction" mechanic to the Burnout series, and praising the overall player experience. In complimenting the game's points system, Elliott recounted, "the most valuable players I encountered were workmanlike wingers who selflessly chugged along the flanks, crossing the ball for greedy goalhunters like me. It stops players from clustering in the same spots and reinforces the concept that Rocket League is a team game." In a retrospective review written two years after its release, Alec Meer of Rock Paper Shotgun shared similar feelings about the player experience in Rocket League. Meer stated that the game remained "very open, friendly, and accessible to new players across all ages, in contrast to other games with online longevity that tend to be dominated by expert players and difficult to breach by new ones."

Following the Blueprint update in December 2019, players expressed concern that the costs of completing blueprints was more expensive than the cost to open loot boxes, that players got more items for opening a loot box, and that in general, the loot box system felt more rewarding. Within a week of the update, Psyonix reduced the prices of completing blueprints by half and refunded credits for those that had spent them already.

Subsequent games like the Football mode on Nintendo Switch Sports and Drag x Drive have been compared to Rocket League.

=== Sales ===
On July 11, 2015, Psyonix announced that there were around 120,000 concurrent players across both PlayStation 4 and Windows. By the end of July, the game had been downloaded over 5 million times, and had 179,000 concurrent players. Psyonix stated that Rocket League's quick paced success far exceeded their expectations.

Psyonix announced that over one million copies of the game had been sold on Steam by August 2015. By the end of 2015, the game had been downloaded over eight million times, and grossed over $50 million. In February 2016, Psyonix stated Rocket League has earned $70 million in revenues with at least four million copies sold, not including downloads on the PlayStation system; they have tracked at least 12 million unique players of the game, including both purchases and during free play offers such as its availability on the PlayStation Plus membership program. Within three weeks of its release for the Xbox One, Psyonix observed at least one million unique players for that system. By July 2016, a year after its release, Psyonix reported more than 6.2 million sales of the game across all platforms, including 5.5 million purchases of DLC, with more than $110 million in revenue; 40% of these sales have been for the PlayStation 4 version with the remaining split roughly equally between PC and Xbox One. Psyonix has tracked more than 25 million unique players by January 2017, averaging 1.1 million players a day, and reaching 220,000 concurrent players at one point. Sony stated that Rocket League was the most-downloaded title from the PlayStation Store in 2016. By the beginning of 2018, the number of players had risen to over 40 million, and subsequently reached 50 million by September 2018.

By March 2017, Psyonix reported that Rocket League had sold more than 10.5 million copies across all platforms, and had 29 million registered players, with about a fourth of that having played during February 2017. Dunham estimated that 70% of the game's players had purchased some of the DLC offered for the game by March 2017. In April 2017, Psyonix reported that in addition to 9.5 million digital sales, the game had also sold over a million physical copies at retail.

=== Awards ===
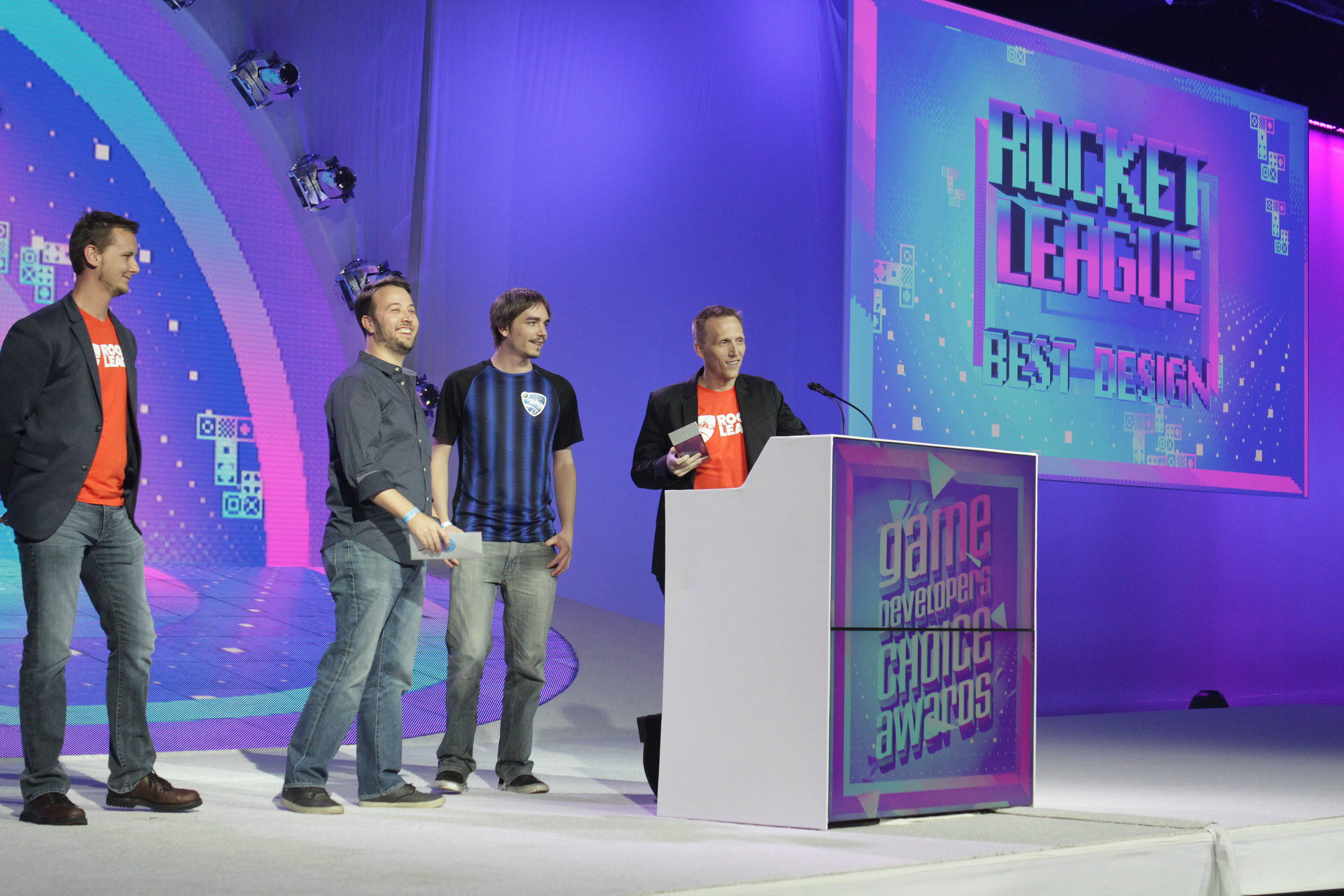
Members from Psyonix, including founder Dave Hagewood (right), receiving the Game Developers Choice Award for the game at the 2016 Game Developers Conference

After the E3 2015 event, Rocket League received multiple nominations and won several awards, including PlayStation Universe's "Best Sports Game of E3", as well as Gaming Trend's "Best Multiplayer Game of E3". At The Game Awards 2015 in December, Rocket League won the award for Best Independent Game and Best Sports/Racing Game, and was nominated for Best Multiplayer.

At the 19th Annual D.I.C.E. Awards in February 2016, the Academy of Interactive Arts & Sciences awarded Rocket League with Sports Game of the Year, Outstanding Achievement in Online Gameplay and the D.I.C.E. Sprite Award. Rocket League was awarded the Best Design at the 2016 Game Developers Choice Awards. At the 2016 SXSW Gaming Awards, Rocket League was awarded the "Excellence in Multiplayer" prize. Rocket League won three BAFTA Games Awards for Multiplayer, Sports, and Family, and was nominated for two others, Best Game and Game Design. It also won the following year for the BAFTA's Evolving Game award. In 2017, the game was nominated for "e-Sports Game of the Year" and "Still Playing" at the Golden Joystick Awards, and for "Best Spectator Game" in IGN's Best of 2017 Awards. It won the award for "Best Post-Launch Support" in Game Informer' 2017 Sports Game of the Year Awards.

In 2018, the game was nominated for "eSports Game of the Year" at the Golden Joystick Awards. The game won the award for "Fan Favorite Sports/Racing Game" at the Gamers' Choice Awards, whereas its other nomination was for "Fan Favorite eSports Game". It was also nominated for "eSports Title of the Year" at the Australian Games Awards. In 2019, the game was nominated for the "Still Playing" award at the Golden Joystick Awards.
