= CellFactor: Revolution =

2007 video game

- Developers: Timeline Interactive, Artificial Studios, Immersion Games
- Platform: Microsoft Windows
- Release: May 8, 2007
- Genre: First-person shooter
- Mode: Multiplayer

CellFactor: Revolution is a first-person shooter video game developed by Timeline Interactive, Artificial Studios and Immersion Games. It was released on May 8, 2007, for Microsoft Windows. The game was designed to show off what AGEIA PhysX cards are capable of. The cards are designed for physics processing, which allows the video game that uses them to have a physics-based gameplay.

== Gameplay ==
Designed to show the effects that can be supported with the AGEIA card, CellFactor: Revolution started out as a tech demo. After a positive response on E3 2008, the scope became closer to a full game. The game consists of three classes (Guardian, Black Ops and Bishop) and five maps to play on. Besides the main multiplayer mode, CellFactor: Revolution also has a campaign mode that serves as a tutorial where the players go through a series of challenges against bots.

As a part of its specific AGEIA physics design, CellFactor: Revolution lets the environment to act as a weapon with psi powers. Using those character's powers, any of the smaller items can be lifted and targeted towards the enemies. Each class has their own set of special skills, like the gravity bomb (Black Ops), super jump (Guardian) and ability to part large masses of objects at high speeds (Bishop). When enough power is built, the player can push through a pile of items and use that to take out opponents, simply called a "PhysX Kill".

There are four primary weapons included with their advantages and disadvantages: Lethe, a single shot pistol for the Black Ops class (with exclusive secondary weapons like mines and gravity grenades); Phlegethon, a powered sniper rifle; Acheron, a rocket launcher and Styx, an auto rifle that can be used as a grenade launcher.

== Reception ==
CellFactor: Revolution received a mixed reception from critics. Review aggregators GameRankings and Metacritic assigned scores of 49% and 50/100.

== Legacy ==
In June 2009, another first-person shooter based on the CellFactor engine was released for PlayStation 3, Xbox 360 and Microsoft Windows called CellFactor: Psychokinetic Wars, available through digital download. It includes a single-player mode, composed of 30 missions, with 10 per each of the character classes and several multiplayer modes, along with seven arenas. The game includes four game modes: Capture the Flag, Deathmatch, Team Deathmatch and Assault.
