= Monster Madness: Battle for Suburbia =

2007 video game

- Developers: Artificial Studios; Immersion Games
- Publisher: SouthPeak Games
- Engine: Unreal Engine 3
- Platforms: Xbox 360, Microsoft Windows
- Release: 2007
- Genre: Shoot 'em up
- Modes: Single-player, multiplayer

Monster Madness: Battle for Suburbia is a 2007 video game developed by Artificial Studios and Immersion Games and released for the Xbox 360 and Microsoft Windows. Players are able to combine objects found around the town to create bigger and better weapons with which to destroy the monster menace. The game includes five environments and hundreds of enemies. Four-player cooperative play is available as well.

== Gameplay ==
Players control one of four playable characters and attempt to escape the monster-infested locale, defeating various forms of zombies and other monsters and boss creatures in order to progress through the game. There are five chapters in Monster Madness: Suburban Nightmare, Shopping Maul, High School Hell, Cemetery Scary, and Evil Castle. Each chapter contains 3 to 5 stages.

Each character is armed with unique weapons and special moves. Each stage contains one secret character-specific melee weapon for all four characters.

While there are a large number of melee weapons in the world, the main focus is on the character's signature melee weapon and the various constructible and upgradable guns. Each character has a class of melee weapons that they feel most comfortable with. By using their favored weapon, they gain access to a powerful special attack once their power bar is charged to the max by killing enemies. In addition to the melee weapons, there are also 15 different guns that will be built using 25 different types of weapon parts scattered and hidden in each level. Each gun also has 3 different levels of upgrades which not only makes the gun more powerful, but can change the way it operates as well. For example, nailgun level 1 has players wielding two semi-automatic nailguns, while nailgun 3 has an extended clip and is fully automatic.

There are also features such as online play with up to 16 players on Xbox Live, and costumes for all players that can be unlocked during or after the game is complete.

Another iteration of this game entitled Monster Madness: Grave Danger for the PlayStation 3 includes major improvements on the game such as reworked cameras, a new tight control scheme, and full online co-op accessibility for the Adventure mode, as well as 25 all-new Challenge modes.

== Plot ==
During a quiet night in Suburbia, the house of a teenage boy named Zack is invaded by zombies. He, and three other teens, named Carrie, Andy, and Jennifer fight them off and soon realize that monsters of all kinds are taking over the town. They meet a guy named Larry Tools who offers to build weapons for scrap and mysterious objects known as Monster Tokens. After fighting their way through the local mall and high school, they're told by Larry that the monsters are coming from a world of pure evil, ruled by an entity called the Lord of Demons, and the only way to stop them is to defeat the Lord himself and take his Monster Token. Once they go through an old cemetery, the four teenagers make their way to a deadly castle full of traps, and team up with a chainsaw wielding guy named Billy, before making their way to a secret lab with a Rubik's cube that acts as the key to the Lord of Demons' realm. Upon defeating him, the teens only ally reveals that he's really Lawrence Thompson, the castle's original owner, and that he's the one who sent all the monsters as part of a plan to bring himself eternal fame by stealing the Devil's soul, and using the power within it to turn himself into a rock and roll star demon. After a long battle, Larry explodes, releasing all the Monster Tokens, who were actually the missing citizens of Suburbia. The ghost of a janitor then tells the teens it's time to get to school, and it's revealed that everything they went through was a dream, until real UFO's show up above the high school, and the teens prepare for battle yet again.

== Reception ==
Reception

Aggregate score
Aggregator	Score	
Aggregator	PC	Xbox 360
Metacritic	59/100	55/100

Review scores
Publication	Score	
Publication	PC	Xbox 360
Edge	5/10	5/10
Electronic Gaming Monthly	N/A	4.17/10
Eurogamer	N/A	5/10
Game Informer	N/A	7.5/10
GameSpot	5.1/10	5/10
GameZone	5/10	5/10
IGN	N/A	4.8/10
Official Xbox Magazine (US)	N/A	4/10
PC Gamer (US)	42%	N/A
X-Play	N/A	3/5

The game received "mixed" reviews on both platforms according to the review aggregation website Metacritic.

== See also ==
- List of Games for Windows titles
- Zombies Ate My Neighbors
