= Supersonic Acrobatic Rocket-Powered Battle-Cars =

2008 video game

- Developer: Psyonix
- Publisher: Psyonix
- Director: Dave Hagewood
- Producers: Heather Chandler; Justin Washington
- Composers: Adam B. Metal; Tony Porter
- Engine: Unreal Engine 3
- Platform: PlayStation 3
- Release: NA: October 9, 2008; EU: February 12, 2009
- Genre: Sports
- Modes: Single-player, multiplayer

Supersonic Acrobatic Rocket-Powered Battle-Cars is a vehicular soccer video game developed by Psyonix and released for the PlayStation 3 in North America in October 2008 and in Europe in February 2009. The campaign mode of the game is made up of a series of varied mini-games and tournaments against AI that can only be played in single-player. A sequel, titled Rocket League, was released in 2015.

== Gameplay ==
The game is played by one or more players, locally or online, using their car to hit a soccer ball that is much larger than the car to score a goal. Each goal is worth one point, and the team with the most points when 5 minutes have passed wins. The game includes mechanics such as the double jump, which allows to jump another time in the air after jumping from the ground, giving a faster in-air speed.

== Reception ==
Reception

Aggregate score
Aggregator	Score
Metacritic	67/100

Review scores
Publication	Score
GameSpot	6/10
IGN	6.5/10

Supersonic Acrobatic Rocket-Powered Battle-Cars received mixed reviews by critics according to Metacritic, a review aggregator.

== Sequel ==
In March 2011, Psyonix confirmed that there was a sequel in development but that it was far from completion due to them having difficulty pitching it to publishers or acquiring the finances required to self-publish. In September 2013, Psyonix announced more details, saying that there would be a free alpha version released for testing and improvement on the PC before being ported to consoles. Rocket League was released for the PlayStation 4 and Microsoft Windows on July 7, 2015, and for other platforms at later dates. It has been free-to-play since September 23, 2020 and is currently available on PlayStation 4, PlayStation 5, Xbox One, Xbox Series X and Series S, Microsoft Windows, Nintendo Switch and Nintendo Switch 2.
