= ID Tech Camps =

Summer computer camp

iD Tech Camps
- Type: Private
- Founded: 1999 in Los Gatos, California, United States
- Founder: Alexa Ingram-Cauchi, Kathryn Ingram
- Headquarters: Campbell, California
- Key people: Pete Ingram-Cauchi, CEO
- Products: computer technology education
- Website: www.idtech.com

iD Tech Camps is a summer computer camp, based in Campbell, California, that specializes in providing computer technology education to children ages 7 through 19. iD Tech Camps are held at more than 150 U.S. college and university campuses and have expanded into international locations as well.

== History ==
iD Tech Camps was founded as “internalDrive” in California in 1999. In 2013, the company rebranded as iD Tech.

=== Enrollment and expansion ===
In its first season, iD Tech Camps began with 270 campers. 6,000 attended in 2004 and 8,000 were expected in 2005. In 2011, 20,000 students attended iD Tech Camps and in 2013, there were 28,000 students enrolled in iD Tech Camps courses across dozens of U.S. locations. In 2014, iD Tech Camps, as a company, was "the largest of its kind"; expected enrollment that year was over 36,000 students. 40,000 students were expected to attend iD Tech Camps in 2015; and over 50,000 in 2016 and 2017; – this included international locations, GEMS Nations Academy in Dubai and the University of Hong Kong.

=== Alexa Café ===
Attracting girls to iD Tech Camp programs was cited as a challenge in 2002. In 2014, 15% of iD Tech Camps’ 36,000 students were girls. The company test-ran a girls-only camp program, Alexa Café, in the Bay Area in 2014 and expanded it to nine locations in 2015. Susan Wojcicki (former CEO of YouTube) was an early advocate for Alexa Café. The mission of Alexa Café is to "fight and decrease the gender gap in the tech industry one camp at a time." In Alexa Café’s second year at the University of Washington in 2016, Lynn (a UW alum) and Howard Behar (retired Starbucks president) sponsored the local program, offering scholarships to 40 girls in the Tacoma and Highline school districts. In 2017, the Girl Scouts coordinated with iD Tech Camps to bring Alexa Café to Southern Nevada. Girls are now 25% of iD Tech Camp attendees.

== Camp courses and online education ==
iD Tech Camps offers courses in video game design, programming, app development, game modding, 3D modeling, robotics, graphic arts, web design, digital video editing, digital photography, film production, and AI / Machine Learning. Younger children may take courses in Adobe Photoshop and Multimedia Fusion, while older children may take courses in app design, such as Unreal Development Kit and programming languages, such as Java, C++, and Scratch.

In a 2013 study, which analyzed existing research that spanned over a decade, nonprofit research institute SRI International found that "using digital games in teaching can enhance student learning." iD Tech Camps uses popular video games, including Portal 2, TrackMania, Shootmania, Dota 2, and Rocket League, in its curriculum. Mojang’s Minecraft has been used as a "teaching tool for game design, logic, and storytelling." In 2013, iD Tech Camps offered four different Minecraft-related courses.

Campers are given the opportunity to participate in traditional summer camp activities, like swimming, kickball, frisbee, and other sports as well.

=== iD Tech 365 ===
On November 1, 2011, iD Tech Camps began offering a year-round subscription-based service called iD Tech 365 (rebranded as TechRocket). This subscription service offers online tutorials and video lessons in game design, programming, mobile apps, and digital art.

== Locations ==
The company headquarters is in Campbell, California. As of 2016, the company offered summer camps at more than 150 campus locations throughout the United States, including the University of Washington, UCSD, UCLA, UCSB, Emory University, Georgia Tech, Princeton, Stanford, Washington University in St. Louis, University of Houston, and Yale.

Outside the US, iD Tech Camp programs were also offered in Hong Kong, Dubai, Singapore and London.

== Alums and recognition ==
In 2011, iD Tech alumna Rebecca Garcia co-founded the New York City chapter of CoderDojo. In 2013, Garcia was one of the 11 named as a Champion of Change for tech inclusion. Ian Cinnamon, and iD Tech alum, authored “DIY Drones for The Evil Genius” and has worked for many prominent technology companies and startups.
