= Mario Caribé =

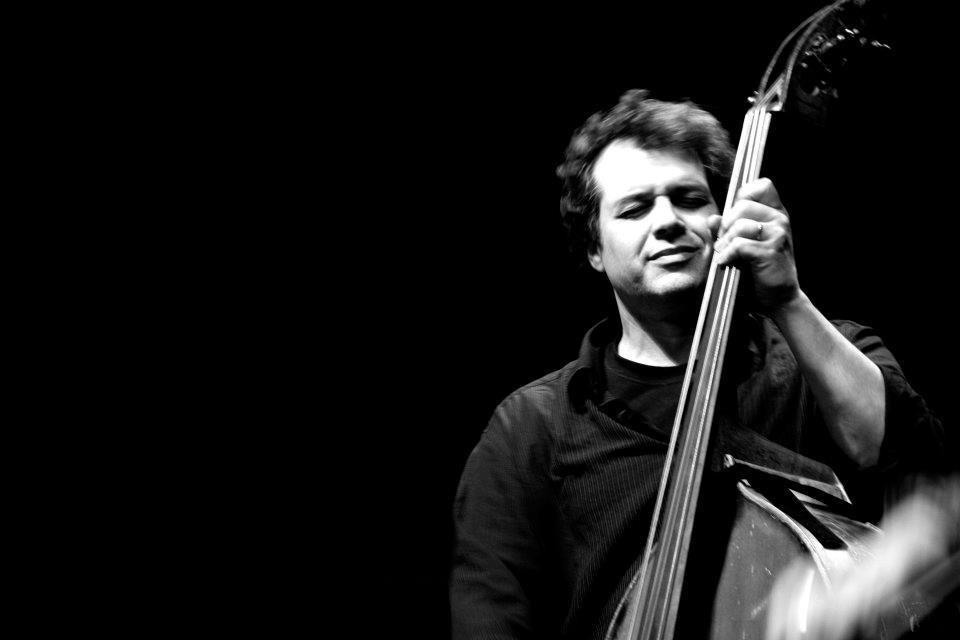

Background information
- Born: 1964 (age 60–61); São Paulo, Brazil
- Genres: Jazz; bossa nova; samba; Afro-Brazilian
- Instrument(s): Bass, guitar, vocal, percussion

Mario Lima Caribé da Rocha (born 6 August 1964) is a Brazilian bassist, composer, and educator.

== Biography ==
Caribé started learning guitar at the age of 13 and switched to bass a year later, and beginning his career at the local jazz scene. He learnt bass with Brazilian musician Nico Assumpção before started studying at Universidade Estadual de Campinas in 1983, taking B.Mus on composition. He also studied double bass with Paulo Pugliese. In 1996, he moved to Scotland with his family for study purposes. In Scotland, he has collaborated with many musicians such as Tommy Smith, Kenny Wheeler, Carol Kidd, Norma Winston, Louise Gibson, Suzanne Bonnar, Phil Bancroft, Andy Panaiy, Tom Bancroft, Jamie Anderson, Brian Kellock, Steve Hamilton, John Rae (musician), Clark Tracey, Tom Gordon, Jason Rebello, Gene Calderazzo, Kevin McKenzie, Alex Yellowlees, Nigel Clark, Malcom MacFarlane, Paul Harrison, Paddy Flaherty, Dave Milligan, Guy Barker, Eddie Severn, Gerard Presencer, Colin Steele, Andor Jensen, Claude Deppa, Dominic Alldis and Adam Glasser. He has also played with leading North American artists such as Bobby Watson, Scott Hamilton, Joe Locke, Valery Ponomarev and Madeline Eastman. In Scotland, he is involved in Scottish National Jazz Orchestra and many other projects. He is now also a lecturer at Royal Conservatoire of Scotland. His specialty is in jazz, Brazilian, and Latin music such as bossa nova, samba, and Afro-Brazilian.

== Discography ==
- Bacuris (Caber, 2002)
- Hands On (Krib, 2010)

== Performances ==
- Joe Locke - Feel the Vibes (2012)
- Blue Mondays: Jazz and Harps with Mario Caribé (2013)
- Blue Mondays with Mario Caribé (2014)
- Blue Mondays with Mario Caribé (2014)
- The Music of Tom Jobim (2017)
