= John Rae (musician) =

Scottish jazz drummer, composer, and band leader

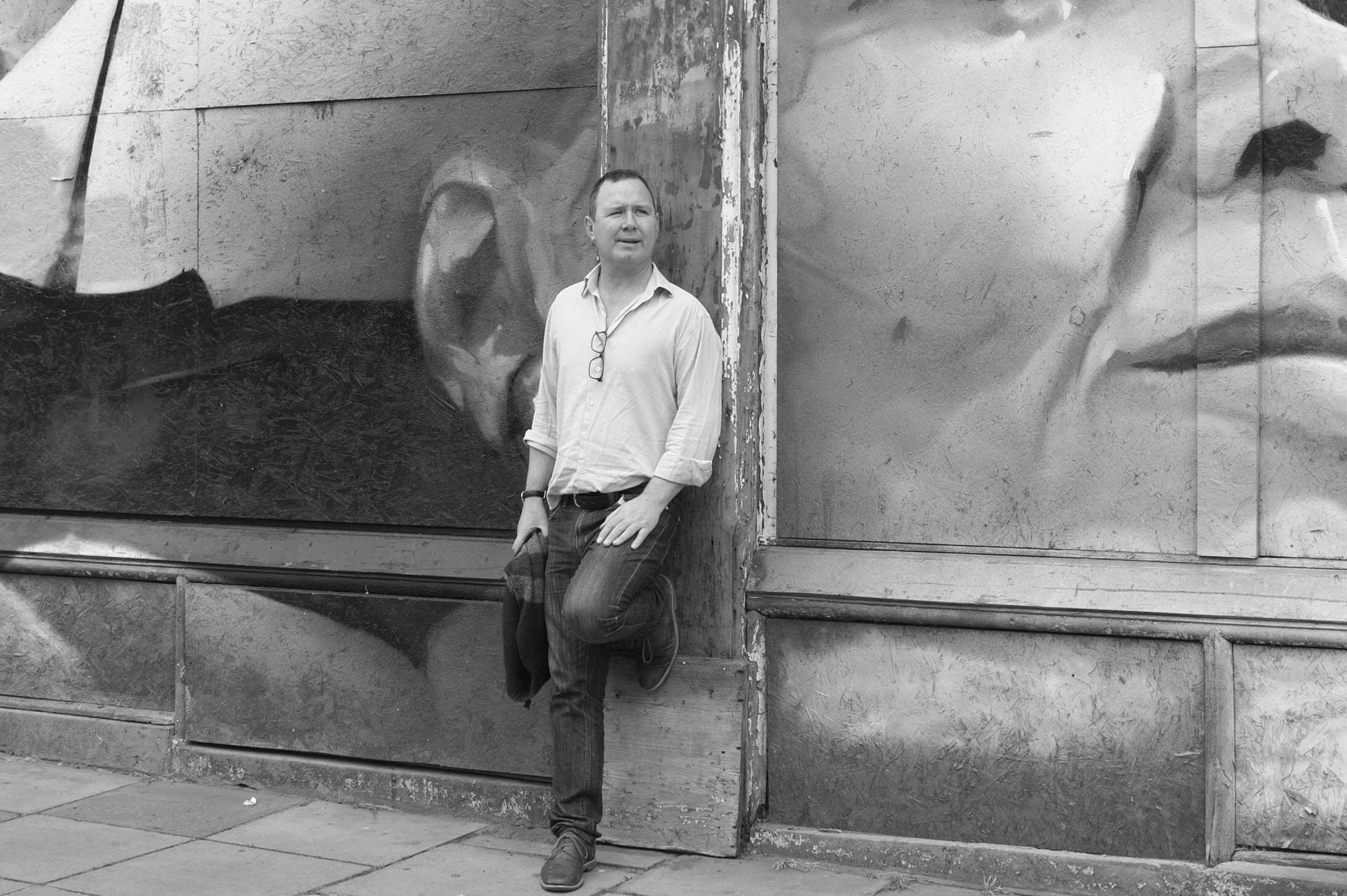
- John Rae musician-composer

Background information
- Born: 8 June 1966 (age 60); Edinburgh, Scotland
- Genres: Jazz, swing, jazz fusion, free improvisation
- Occupations: Musical Director Aotearoa Jazz Orchestra, Musician, band leader, composer, educator
- Instruments: Drums, violin, piano
- Years active: 1966–present
- Labels: Thick Records NZ, Rattle, Caber Music, Linn, Hep
- Member of: The Troubles
- Website: contact07628.wixsite.com/mysite/

John Rae (born 8 June 1966) is a Scottish jazz drummer, composer, and band leader.

== Early life and career ==
John Rae was born in Edinburgh on 8 June 1966 to Scottish parents Margaret and Ronnie Rae. Rae was brought up in the Sighthill area of the city before moving to Livingston as a teenager. He attended St. Kentigern's Academy, Blackburn in West Lothian. John and his other five siblings were encouraged by their father and mother, both jazz musicians and educators, to pursue a career in music from an early age. When he was fourteen he attended a weekly jazz workshop under the drumming tutelage of Bill Kyle and Mike Travis. There he met saxophonist Tommy Smith. Under Smith, they won the Edinburgh International Jazz Festival Best Group award in 1981 and a year later Rae won Best Group under his own name. Rae was soon performing around Edinburgh and Scotland in a quartet with Tommy Smith. In 1982 he recorded for the first time on Smith's debut recording Giant Strides in a trio format featuring Rae, Smith and bassist Alan Taylor. Rae then went on to tour and perform around Europe with a group under the musical direction of Johnny Keating and spent the next three years living and playing around the world in a variety of musical settings that included Soviet and American cruise liners, before moving to New York in 1984.

On his return to Scotland, Rae began the seminal Scottish jazz group The John Rae Collective. As its leader, the ensemble went on to contest Smith's dominance of the Scottish jazz world in the late 1980s and the sextet was a key breeding ground for musicians who subsequently came to prominence in their own right, including pianist Brian Kellock, saxophonist Phil Bancroft, trumpeter Colin Steele, bassist Kenny Ellis and guitarist Kevin Mackenzie, all of whom are active in multiple projects both as leaders and sidemen. Another of Rae's early ventures alongside Dundee musician and composer Kevin Murray, was the Giant Stepping Stanes, who broke new ground in combining elements of modern jazz with Scottish folk music, an area of cross-fertilization that has since expanded steadily and fruitfully, not least through the early work of Rae.

Leaving Scotland again, Rae spent the next five years living in Las Palmas de Gran Canaria. There, along with Venezuela musician Julio Pacheco he formed the group Sex and Violence that included musicians from the US, Cuba, Sweden, Gran Canaria, Scotland and Venezuela and recorded the album Ten Wasted Years. Returning once more to his native Scotland, Rae formed Celtic Feet in 1998, a group that incorporated Scotland's jazz and traditional musicians around original compositions by Rae. Again with Brian Kellock and Phil Bancroft along with Eilidh Shaw fiddle, Mario Lima Caribe bass and Simon Thoumire concertina, the ensemble recorded two critically acclaimed albums for the Scottish label Caber Music and performed at festivals throughout Europe. Other notable works by Rae at this time included Big Feet & the Islay Pipe Band.

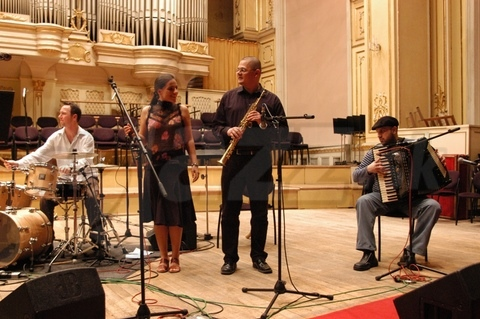
John Rae with Bea Palya, Dongó Szokolay and Martin Lubenov

During this time Rae was also collaborating with European musicians in the groups 'Magic Feet' with Hungarian violinist Robert Farkas, and the Balkan all star group 'Miraculous Meetings' alongside Bea Palya, Dongó Szokolay and Martin Lubenovas as well as touring and recording with the award-winning Brian Kellock Trio and Colin Steele Quintet.

Rae reunited with Tommy Smith as the drummer for the Scottish National Jazz Orchestra from 2000 to 2003, recording Miles Ahead featuring Canadian trumpet player Ingrid Jensen and was awarded a Herald Angel Award at the 2005 Edinburgh Festival Fringe. He was the music director and composer for the modern dance piece by the national centre for dance in Scotland, Dance Base, entitled 'Off Kilter'.

In 2008 Rae moved country again. This time to New Zealand and in 2010 was the first ever jazz Composer-in-Residence at Victoria University, New Zealand.. Now a New Zealand citizen, Rae is the leader and composer for the New Zealand jazz group The Troubles.

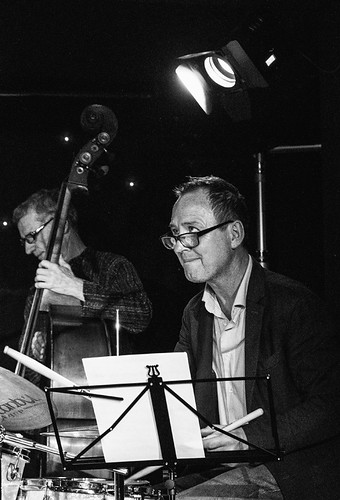
The Troubles, John Rae and Patrick Bleakley

Rae is the musical director for the national jazz orchestra of New Zealand, The Aotearoa Jazz Orchestra.

== Performance and recordings ==
As well as his debut recording with the Scottish saxophonist Tommy Smith Rae has subsequently recorded over 70 albums as a leader and side man, including two BBC Jazz Albums of the Year (2004 and 2003).International projects involving Rae include the Afro Celtic Jazz Ensemble, Magic Feet and Miraculous Meetings and has performed and recorded with prominent jazz musicians including Vijay Iyer, Ethan Iverson, Guus Janssen, Brian Kellock, Joe Lovano, Mike Nock, Lee Konitz, Ingrid Jensen, George Colligan, Dave Liebman, Maria Schneider, BBC Radio Big Band, Tony Scott, Charles McPherson, David Berkman, Sheila Jordan, Art Farmer, Jamie Cullum, Warren Vache, Finlay MacDonald, Julian Arguelles, Buddy DeFranco, Red Rodney, Julio Pacheco, Mark Murphy, Pete King, Scott Hamilton, Jim Mullen, Barney Kessel, Kenny Wheeler, Ken Peplowski, Martin Taylor, Jesse Davis and the New Zealand String Quartet.

== Selected discography ==
=== As leader ===
- John Rae Ben Wilcock - March of the Octopus, Thick Records NZ
- John Rae Ben Wilcock - Splendid Isolation, Thick Records NZ
- John Rae Trio – The Boss Has Lost It, Thick Records NZ
- John Rae Trio – Where The Wild Clematis Grow, Thick Records NZ
- John Rae – Uncouth and Without Form, Thick Records NZ
- John Rae – Lighthouse, Thick Records NZ
- The Troubles – Twenty Twelve, Thick Records NZ
- The Troubles – Kapow!, Thick Records NZ
- The Troubles – The Troubles, Rattle Records
- Campbell/Rae/Dyne – Storm in a Teacup, Rattle Records
- John Rae Collective – The Big If Smiles Again, Thick Records NZ 022
- John Rae's Celtic Feet – Celtic Feet, Thick Records NZ 010
- John Rae's Celtic Feet – Beware the Feet, Thick Records NZ 018

=== As sideman ===
- Oscar Lavën – Questions in Red, Thick Records NZ
- Ben Wilcock – The River Tethys, Thick Records NZ
- Royal New Zealand Air Force Jazz Orchestra – Suites and Moods, Thick Records NZ
- Brian Kellock BK3 – Think About It, Thick Records NZ
- Ben Wilcock and The Jelly Rolls – The Phantom Canoe, Thick Records NZ
- Mike Nock – Transformations, CDMANUS129
- Mike Nock – Sketches, CDMANUS130
- Warren Vache – Just Hold Me, INN10
- Fionna Duncan – Body and Soul, TenToTen Records
- Ronnie Rae – Cradle to the Groove, TenToTen Records
- Tommy Smith – Giant Strides, G.R.P 322
- Martin Taylor – Change of Heart, Linn AKD
- Spike Robinson- Stairway to the Stars, Hep 03
- Tom Bancroft Orchestra – Tom Bancroft, Caber 001
- Hue and Cry – Stars Crash Down, Circa – CIRCD 15
- Brian Kellock Trio – Something's got to Give, Caber 003
- Brian Kellock Trio – Live at Henry's, Caber 020 (BBC Album of the Year 2003)
- Mario Caribe – Bacuris, Caber 015
- John Burges – Urge to Burge, Caber 011
- Findlay Macdonald – Findlay Macdonald, Foot Stompin Records
- Colin Steele – Twilight Dreams, Caber 021 (BBC Album of the Year 2004)
- Colin Steele – The Journey Home, Caber 029
- Scottish National Jazz Orchestra – Miles Ahead, Spartacus Records

== Selected commissions ==
- Dulce - Todd Foundation
- Where the Wild Clematis Grows - WW100
- North to the Apricots - New Zealand Symphony Orchestra/Wellington Jazz Orchestra, Director Roger Fox,
- Happy - Royal New Zealand Air Force Concert Orchestra
- The Troubles - Creative New Zealand
- Ricky - Wellington Civic Choir 5th anniversary
- The Long Road Home - Colin Hemmingsen/NZSM for saxophone and string quartet
- The House That Jack Built - for solo piano premiered by Dan Poynton
- Skippy - Scottish National Jazz Orchestra A Tribute to Monk.
- Magic Feet - Serious Music Productions
- Off Kilter - Dance Base
- Jock Stein - A Love Supreme Scottish National Jazz Orchestra
- Big Feet - Scottish Arts Council New Music
- Brian Kellock - Creative Scotland
- Root's to Fruits - National Youth Jazz Orchestra of Scotland
- Your Highness Uranus - Scottish National Jazz Orchestra
- Celtic Feet - Scottish Arts Council
