= Robert Owens discography =

- Studio albums: 5
- EPs: 1
- Compilation albums: 1
- Singles: 119

American singer, songwriter, DJ, and music product Robert Owens has released five studio albums, one extended play, 119 singles.

== Albums ==
=== Studio albums ===
Title	Details
Rhythms in Me	Released: June 8, 1990; Formats: CD, cassette, digital download; Label: 4th & B'way Records, Island
The Journey	Released: 1996 (Japan-release only); Formats: CD; Label: Cutting Edge
Night-Time Stories	Released: March 25, 2008; Formats: CD, digital download; Label: Compost
Art	Released: October 19, 2010; Formats: CD, digital download; Label: Compost
Naked: Part 01	Released: September 30, 2022; Formats: CD, digital download; Label: Musical Directions

=== Compilation albums ===
- Love Will Find Its Way: The Best of Robert Owens (2002)

== Extended plays ==
- The Statement (1994)

== Singles ==
=== As lead artist ===
List of singles, with selected chart positions and certifications, showing year released and album name
Title	Year	Peak chart positions			Album
Title	Year	US Dance	UK	UK Dance	Album
"Visons"	1990	19	—	—	Rhythm in Me
"Happy"	1990	12	—	—	Rhythm in Me
"Far Away"	1990	12	—	—	Rhythm in Me
"I'll Be Your Friend"	1991	1	25	3	Non-album single
"Too Much for Me"	1992	—	—	—	Non-album single
"Gotta Work"	1992	—	—	—	Non-album single
"Was I Here Before?"	1993	—	—	—	Non-album single
"All Night Long"	1994	—	—	—	Non-album single
"Tell Me"	1994	—	—	—	The Statement - EP
"After the Rain"	1994	—	—	—	The Statement - EP
"Come Together" (with Michael Watford)	1995	—	94	16	Non-album single
"Love Will Find Its Way"	1996	—	—	—	The Journey
"High Hopes"	1997	—	—	—	Non-album single
"A Thing Called Love"	1998	—	—	—	Non-album single
"Bright"	2000	—	—	—	Non-album single
"Bringing Down the Walls"	2001	—	—	—	Non-album single
"Can't Stop"	2001	—	—	—	Non-album single
"So Into You"	2001	—	—	—	Non-album single
"Never Too Late"	—	—	—		Non-album single
"Things That Make You Feel Good"	2002	—	—	—	Non-album single
"Inside My World"	2008	—	—	—	Night-Time Stories
"Never Give Up"	2008	—	—	—	Night-Time Stories
"One Body"	2011	—	—	—	Non-album single
"One Tear"	2011	—	—	—	Non-album single
"Sacrifice"	2012	—	—	—	Non-album single
"Love / Release"	2015	—	—	—	Non-album single
"Reach Out"	2023	—	—	—	Non-album single
"Love & Peace"	2023	—	—	—	Non-album single
"Love"	2023	—	—	—	Non-album single
"Phenomenal"	2024	—	—	—	Non-album single

=== As a featured artist ===
List of singles, with selected chart positions and certifications, showing year released and album name
Title	Year	Peak chart positions			Album
Title	Year	US Dance	UK	UK Dance	Album
"Tears" (Frankie Knuckles featuring Robert Owens and Satoshi Tomiie)	1989	10	50	25	Non-album single
"Up & Away" (David Guetta featuring Robert Owens)	1994	—	—	—	Non-album single
"Darkness" (Satoshi Tomiie featuring Robert Owens and Cevin Fisher)	1999	4	—	—	Full Lick
"Low Life" (Layo & Bushwacka! featuring Robert Owens)	1999	—	—	—	Low Life
"Mine to Give" (Photek featuring Robert Owens)	2000	1	—	17	Solaris
"Can't Stop" (Block 16 featuring Robert Owens)	2001	—	—	—	Morning Sun
"The Club" (Mr. C featuring Robert Owens)	2002	—	—	—	Non-album single
"Only In Your Eyes" (Uschi Classen featuring Robert Owens)	2002	—	—	—	Soul Magic
"Last Night a DJ Blew My Mind" (Fab For featuring Robert Owens)	2002	—	34	6	Non-album single
"I Go Back" (Harry Romero featuring Robert Owens)	2003	—	—	22	Thatbeat
"Different Drum" (London Elektricity featuring Robert Owens)	2003	—	—	—	Billion Dollar Gravy
"Living a Life" (The Ks featuring Robert Owens)	2003	—	—	—	Non-album single
"Longing" (Random House Project featuring Robert Owens)	2004	—	—	—	Non-album single
"Take Me Back" (Koma & Bones featuring Robert Owens)	2004	—	—	—	Shutterspeed
"Always" (Quentin Harris featuring Robert Owens)	2005	—	—	—	Non-album single
"You Can't Fight It" (East River Rituals featuring Robert Owens)	2005	—	—	—	Non-album single
"Wonderful World" (Sasoto featuring Robert Owens)	2005	—	—	—	Non-album single
"I Need" (Marc Romboy featuring Robert Owens)	2006	—	—	—	Gemini
"Walk a Mile in my Shoes" (Coldcut featuring Robert Owens)	2006	—	—	4	Sound Mirrors
"The Energy (Goes Round & Round)" (Rob Mello featuring Robert Owens)	2006	—	—	—	Non-album single
"If" (Haji & Emanuel featuring Robert Owens)	2007	—	—	—	Non-album single
"A Greater Love" (DJ Spen featuring Robert Owens)	2007	—	—	—	Non-album single
"Escape from the Madness" (Rob Pearson featuring Robert Owens and C-Soul)	2007	—	—	—	Non-album single
"Keep It Real" (Dan Berkson featuring Robert Owens)	2007	—	—	—	Non-album single
"Merging" (TJ Kong & Nuno Dos Santos featuring Robert Owens)	2007	—	—	—	Non-album single
"Love Someone" (DJ Spen featuring Robert Owens)	2007	—	—	—	Non-album single
"Falling" (Kid Massive featuring Robert Owens)	2007	—	—	—	Non-album single
"4 Your Love" (Quentin Harris featuring Robert Owens)	2007	—	—	—	Non-album single
"Reflections" (Dan Berkson & James What featuring Robert Owens)	2008	—	—	—	Non-album single
"Keep On" (Dan Berkson & James What featuring Robert Owens)	2008	—	—	—	Non-album single
"Twilite People" (Gene Hunt featuring Robert Owens)	2008	—	—	—	Non-album single
"Deep Down" (Ron Trent featuring Robert Owens)	2008	—	—	—	Non-album single
"Black Man" (Gianluca Pighi featuring Robert Owens)	2008	—	—	—	Non-album single
"Loosen Up" (The Jinks featuring Robert Owens)	2009	—	—	—	Non-album single
"Where Were You" (TJ Kong & Nuno Dos Santos featuring Robert Owens)	2010	—	—	—	Non-album single
"Right Now" (Freaks featuring Robert Owens)	2010	—	—	—	Non-album single
"Celebration" (TJ Kong & Russ Gabriel featuring Robert Owens)	2011	—	—	—	Non-album single
"Clarity" (Snuff Crew featuring Robert Owens)	2011	—	—	—	Non-album single
"You Are" (Hugo Barritt featuring Robert Owens)	2011	—	—	—	Non-album single
"Another Day" (Kid Massive featuring Robert Owens)	2011	—	—	—	Non-album single
"Keep the Faith" (BCee featuring Robert Owens)	2012	—	—	—	Non-album single
"Say the Word" (Jet Project featuring Robert Owens)	2012	—	—	—	Non-album single
"Fly Free" (Ralf Gun featuring Robert Owens)	2012	—	—	—	Non-album single
"Tomorrow Can Wait" (Luca C & Brigante featuring Robert Owens)	2012	—	—	—	Non-album single
"Our House" (Orgue Electronique featuring Robert Owens)	2012	—	—	—	Non-album single
"Slipknot" (Tube & Berger featuring Robert Owens)	2012	—	—	—	Non-album single
"One Thing" (Strip Steve featuring Robert Owens)	2012	—	—	—	Non-album single
"Trusting Me" (Kris Menace featuring Robert Owens)	2012	—	—	—	Non-album single
"Pushin" (Jakkin Rabbit featuring Robert Owens)	2012	—	—	—	Non-album single
"Invisible" (Circle of Funk featuring Robert Owens)	2013	—	—	—	Non-album single
"Like Now" (Jevne featuring Robert Owens)	2013	—	—	—	Non-album single
"Some People" (Nick Anthony Simoncino featuring Robert Owens)	2014	—	—	—	Non-album single
"Believe in You" (Deep88 featuring Robert Owens)	2014	—	—	—	Non-album single
"Slide" (Roy Davis Jr featuring Robert Owens)	2014	—	—	—	Non-album single
"Back 2 Me" (Positive Divide featuring Robert Owens)	2014	—	—	—	Non-album single
"Brighter Day" (Horixon featuring Robert Owens)	2014	—	—	—	Non-album single
"How Can I" (Marshall Jefferson featuring Gareth Whitehead, Robert Owens)	2014	—	—	—	Non-album single
"I Wanna Fixation" (Leftwing & Kody featuring Robert Owens)	2015	—	—	—	Non-album single
"Never Get It Twisted" (Alex Flatner & Blue Amazon featuring Robert Owens)	2015	—	—	—	Non-album single
"Misty" (Soul Clap featuring Robert Owens)	2015	—	—	—	Non-album single
"Good Day" (Compost Allstars featuring Robert Owens)	2015	—	—	—	Non-album single
"I Came 2 Jack" (Nerdjack featuring Robert Owens)	2015	—	—	—	Non-album single
"A Day's Reality" (Felix Dickinson featuring Robert Owens)	2015	—	—	—	Non-album single
"Holding On" (Capulet featuring Robert Owens)	2016	—	—	—	Non-album single
"Pass Me By" (Pete Herbert & Martin Denev featuring Robert Owens)	2017	—	—	—	Non-album single
"Downtown" (K' Alexi Shelby featuring Robert Owens)	2017	—	—	—	Non-album single
"This Time" (Ourra featuring Robert Owens)	2017	—	—	—	Non-album single
"The Other Man" (Janne Tavi featuring Robert Owens)	2017	—	—	—	Non-album single
"Slipping Into Darkness / As You Are" (Andrew Soul featuring Robert Owens)	2018	—	—	—	Non-album single
"Everything" (Nhan Solo featuring Robert Owens)	2018	—	—	—	Non-album single
"24-7" (Daniel Haaksman featuring Robert Owens and K.Zia)	2018	—	—	—	Non-album single
"Warehouse" (Roberto & Jamie Anderson featuring Robert Owens)	2019	—	—	—	Non-album single
"I Knew You" (Danny Clark & Jay Benham featuring Robert Owens and K.Zia)	2019	—	—	—	Non-album single
"I'll Take You In" (Fred Everything featuring Robert Owens)	2020	—	—	—	Non-album single
"In My Life" (Queer on Acid featuring Robert Owens)	2020	—	—	—	Non-album single
"Not in Vain" (Steve Bug & Clé featuring Robert Owens)	2020	—	—	—	Non-album single
"Tonight" (Joe Ventura featuring Robert Owens)	2020	—	—	—	Non-album single
"With You" (Sebas Ramis featuring Robert Owens)	2021	—	—	—	Non-album single
"Same As Me" (Nebula featuring Robert Owens)	2021	—	—	—	Non-album single
"Ever So" (Paolo Rocco featuring Robert Owens)	2021	—	—	—	Non-album single
"Won't Go Back" (Harley&Muscle featuring Robert Owens)	2021	—	—	—	Non-album single
"Brighter Future" (Gratts featuring Robert Owens)	2021	—	—	—	Non-album single
"Wishing Well" (TMPLT featuring Robert Owens)	2021	—	—	—	Non-album single
"Need You" (DJ Fede featuring Robert Owens)	2022	—	—	—	Non-album single
"Dancing on Mars" (DJ Fede featuring Robert Owens)	2022	—	—	—	Non-album single
"Resurrection" (Simoncino featuring Robert Owens)	2022	—	—	—	Non-album single
"Nonsense War" (Francesco Ferraro & Jame Starck featuring Robert Owens)	2023	—	—	—	Non-album single
"Resurrection" (Simoncino featuring Robert Owens)	2023	—	—	—	Non-album single

== Compilation albums featuring Owens ==
- The Original Chicago House Classics: Full Length 12-Inch Mixes from the Godfathers of House, Demon Music Group Ltd., 2002
- The Kings of House: Compiled & Mixed by Masters At Work, Rapster/BBE Records, 2005
- Renaissance: The Masters Series, Part 9, Renaissance Recordings, 2007
