= Moishe's Bagel =

Scottish band

- Origin: Edinburgh, Scotland
- Genres: Klezmer; jazz; folk; Balkan
- Years active: 2003 - 2022
- Labels: Eachday Music
- Past members: Greg Lawson; Phil Alexander; Pete Garnett; Mario Caribe; Guy Nicholson
- Website: moishesbagel.com

Moishe's Bagel was a Scottish band formed in 2003 that played "jazz-inflected klezmer and Balkan music". They toured worldwide and released three albums. They played their final gig in Edinburgh in 2022.

== Members ==
- Greg Lawson (violin) - studied at the Royal Northern College in Manchester. A freelance violinist, he has played with the Scottish Chamber Orchestra, the Royal Scottish National Orchestra, Mr McFall's Chamber, rock groups, and others. He is known for his orchestral arrangements of the music of Martyn Bennett, which he has conducted in performance by The Grit Orchestra.
- Phil Alexander (piano) - studied with John Tilbury at Goldsmiths College. He leads his own jazz tango trio and plays piano with Salsa Celtica. His compositions have featured on London's South Bank and at Edinburgh's Queen's Hall.
- Pete Garnett (accordion) - after trying classical piano and not enjoying it, he took up the accordion. He taught himself by ear. He also plays music for theatre, puppet shows and silent films.
- Mario Caribe (double bass) - in 1986 he completed a BMus in Composition at Universidade Estadual de Campinas. In native São Paulo he arranged, recorded and produced 7 CDs with a condensed 9 piece jazz band called "Heartbreakers". He has also performed with singers of Brazilian music including Gal Costa, Caetano Veloso, Milton Nascimento, Nana Caymmi and Zizi Possi.
- Guy Nicholson (percussion) - studied tabla, daraouka and congas with UK Indian classical musicians. He has adapted his style to Scottish folk music, and performs with guitarist Tony McManus.

== Albums ==
- Don't Spare the Horses (2005)
- Salt (2007)
- Uncle Roland's Flying Machine (2010)
