= London Electricity =

London Electricity can refer to:

- The London Electricity Board, public utility company responsible for electricity in the London area prior to privatisation in 1990
- London Energy, post-privatisation electricity company for London until absorption to EDF in 2006
- EDF Energy, British subsidiary of French energy company Électricité de France and parent company providing electricity provision in the London area under this name from 2006

== See also ==
- London Elektricity (born Tony Colman, active from 1996), English electronic musician
