= Yikes =

Yikes may refer to:

- Yikes (comics), a 1997 series by Steven Weissman
- Yikes!, a 2011 album by London Elektricity
- "Yikes" (Kanye West song), a 2018 song by Kanye West from Ye
- "Yikes" (Nicki Minaj song), a 2020 standalone single by Nicki Minaj
- "yikes" (Barry), a 2023 TV episode
- Yikes!, a former brand of pencils made by Berol

== See also ==
- Yike
