= Colin Steele =

Colin Steele may refer to:

- Colin Steele (trumpeter)
- Colin Steele (singer)
