= Malcolm Edmonstone =

British jazz pianist and pop arranger (born 1980)

Malcolm Edmonstone (born 1980, Perth, Scotland) is a British jazz pianist and pop arranger. He studied at the Guildhall School of Music and Drama, where he became Head of Jazz for a time. Edmonstone provided orchestral arrangements for Gary Barlow’s 2020 album Music Played by Humans. He has conducted and arranged for the BBC Concert Orchestra numerous times for BBC Radio 2, featuring vocalists Rick Astley, Katie Melua, Mark King, Ruby Turner, Tommy Blaize, Tony Momrelle and Heather Small. In 2020 he was Music Director at the National Theatre for Tony Kushner’s adaptation of The Visit (play). In 2016 he made his BBC Proms debut, arranging and conducting for Iain Ballamy and Liane Carroll.

== Early professional life ==
While studying at Guildhall, he was asked by Laurie Holloway to play piano on an international tour with his wife Marion Montgomery. Edmonstone worked with Holloway on the first three series of the BBC1 television show Strictly Come Dancing, where he played piano and arranged a portion of the music. In 2017 he worked with David Arch as arranger, pianist, and assistant music director.

== Dankworth family ==
At 21, he met Jacqui Dankworth and became her musical director. They recorded the albums Detour Ahead and Back to You. In 2009, he worked with John Dankworth on the album It Happens Quietly (2011). They worked on arrangements on what proved to be the last of many occasions in which Dankworth acted as a mentor.

== Jazz musician ==
Since 2011 Edmonstone has worked with Liane Carroll. They have produced concerts with choir and jazz orchestra. He was a pianist and arranger on her album Seaside (Linn, 2015). He has been a member of Mike Walker's Madhouse band and has played with Mark Lockheart, Stan Sulzmann, and Iain Dixon. At the 19th meeting of the International Association of Schools of Jazz, Dave Liebman invited him to play in his only appearance during that conference. In 2011 he appeared at the Royal Opera House in a master class with jazz drummer Peter Erskine and later the same year at the Royal College of Music as part of their Festival of Percussion.

== Recording musician ==
As a session musician he has performed with Rick Astley, Gary Barlow, Michael Ball, Dame Shirley Bassey, Tony Bennett, Alfie Boe, Madeline Bell, Tommy Blaize, Michael Bolton, Tony Christie, Sir John Dankworth, Bruce Forsyth, Robin Gibb, Mark King, Dame Cleo Laine, Kenny Lynch, David McAlmont, Katie Melua, Liza Minnelli, Tony Momrelle, Donny Osmond, Cliff Richard, Heather Small and Ruby Turner.

== Teaching ==
He has taught at the Royal Academy of Music, Trinity College of Music, Middlesex University, Birmingham Conservatoire, and has been head of jazz at Guildhall.

== Discography ==
=== Broadcast ===
With BBC Concert Orchestra

- BBC Radio 2 ‘House Music’ featuring Melanie C (2020)
- Friday Night is Music Night: The Beatles Reimagined (BBC Radio 2, 2019)
- Friday Night is Motown Night (BBC Radio 2, 2019)
- Friday Night is Music Night: Rick Astley (BBC Radio 2, 2019)

With David Arch

- Ball and Boe; A Very Merry Christmas (ITV, 2019)
- All Star Musicals (ITV, 2017, 2019)

With Liza Minnelli

- Loose Women (ITV, 2011)

With Laurie Holloway

- Strictly Come Dancing (BBC TV, 2004–2006)

With Jacqui Dankworth

- RTÉ New Year Concert (RTÉ, 2011)
- Jazz Line-up - Cleo Laine and Friends (BBC Radio 3, 2011)
- The Paul O'Grady Show (ITV, 2009)

With Michael Bolton

- The Dame Edna Treatment (ITV, 2007)

=== TV themes ===
With Laurie Holloway

- Strictly Come Dancing (BBC, 2004)
- The Dame Edna Treatment (ITV, 2007)

=== Recordings ===
With Gary Barlow

- Music Played by Humans (Polydor, 2020)

Piano, Conductor, Arranger (Orchestral)

With Liane Carroll

- The Right to Love (Quietmoney, 2017)
- Seaside (Linn, 2015)

With Jacqui Dankworth

- It Happens Quietly (Proper, 2011)
- Back to You (Audacious, 2009)
- Detour Ahead (Candid, 2004)

With Laurie Holloway

- Strictly Come Dancing (Sony/BBC TV, 2005)

With Frank Holder

- I Love being here with you (Mainstem, 2007)
- Ballads, Blues and Bop (Mainstem, 2009)

With Tom Rust

- Saints and Singers (Feelerhead, 2004)
- Are we there yet? (Feelerhead, 2010)

With Kate Dimbleby

- Things as they are (2007)

== See also ==
- List of jazz arrangers
