= The Right to Love =

The Right to Love may refer to:

- The Right to Love (1920 film), an American silent drama film directed by George Fitzmaurice
- The Right to Love (1930 German film), 1930 drama German film directed by Luise Fleck
- The Right to Love (1930 American film), a 1930 American drama film directed by Richard Wallace
- The Right to Love (1939 film), 1939 German drama film directed by Joe Stöckel
- Lush Life (Nancy Wilson album), a 1967 album by Nancy Wilson, reissued in 1970 as The Right to Love
- The Right to Love (Liane Carroll album), 2017 album by Liane Carroll
