= Up and Down (Liane Carroll album) =

2011 studio album by Liane Carroll

Studio album by Liane Carroll
- Released: 27 June 2011 (UK)
- Recorded: London, Hastings, Brighton, Prague and Memphis, Tennessee
- Genre: Jazz
- Length: 55:44
- Label: Quietmoney Recordings (QMR0001CD), distributed by Proper Records
- Producer: James McMillan

Liane Carroll chronology
Live at the Lampie (with Brian Kellock) (2009)	Up and Down (2011)	Ballads (2013)

Professional ratings
Review scores
Source	Rating
All About Jazz	4.5/5 stars
The Guardian	4/5 stars
The Jazz Mann	4/5 stars

Up and Down is a studio album by English jazz pianist/vocalist Liane Carroll. Released in June 2011, and launched on 27 June at the Hideaway jazz club in Streatham, south London, it was the winner in the Jazz Album of the Year category at the 2012 Parliamentary Jazz Awards in May 2012. The album entered iTunes's jazz charts at no. 8 and reached the no. 1 spot in its first week of release. It received a four-starred review in The Guardian and a 4.5-starred review from All About Jazz.

Recorded in London, Hastings, Brighton, Prague and Memphis, Tennessee, and produced by trumpeter James McMillan, the album features James McMillan, flugelhorn player Kenny Wheeler and saxophonists Kirk Whalum and Julian Siegel as guest soloists.

== Reception ==
Reviewing the album for The Observer, Dave Gelly said: "Liane Carroll... seems in some magical way to be made out of music. No recording has managed to capture this quality until now, but this one comes close". In a four-starred review for The Guardian, John Fordham said: "Singer/pianist Carroll is a world-class act, but this is the first recording to capture the full range of her expressiveness. Up and Down embraces intimate voice/piano performances, orchestra-backed extravaganzas and jazz jams with soloists of the pedigree of Kenny Wheeler and Julian Siegel." He added: "Tom Waits's Take Me Home is a delicately soulful miniature, and the Christmas song Some Children See Him and the closing I Can Let Go Now are unadorned revelations... But the 82-year-old Kenny Wheeler's flawlessly poetic flugelhorn dialogue with Carroll on Turn Out the Stars might just be the most magical moment".

Chris Parker, reviewing the album for LondonJazz, said that although Carroll was accompanied by a "starry assembly of musicians" on the album, "throughout, the focus is firmly on the Carroll voice and sensibility, inhabiting each song with all the honesty, integrity and sheer communicativeness that have won her, of late, the awards she so richly deserves". Rob Adams, for Scotland's Sunday Herald, said: "Carroll is absolutely on top of her game. Her creativity on a revitalised version of Bobby Timmons’s classic Moanin’ and on the rollicking Witchcraft, with its cheeky reference to Georgie Fame's Yeh Yeh, borders on the volcanic. Now touching, now exhilarating, Up And Down is flat-out brilliant". Bruce Lindsay, in a 4.5-starred review for All About Jazz, said: "She already has a strong body of work to her name, but Up And Down might just be her finest album to date."

== Track listing ==
1. "Buy and Sell" (Laura Nyro), 4:02
2. "What Are You Doing the Rest of Your Life?" (Michel Legrand, Alan Bergman, Marilyn Bergman), 3:01
3. "Moanin'" (Bobby Timmons, Jon Hendricks), featuring Kirk Whalum, 4:29
4. "Take Me Home" (Tom Waits), 3:29
5. "What Now My Love" (Gilbert Bécaud, Pierre Delanoë, Carl Sigman), featuring Kirk Whalum, 6:11
6. "Turn Out the Stars" (Bill Evans), featuring Kenny Wheeler, 6:46
7. "Some Children See Him" (Alfred Burt), 3:58
8. "Witchcraft" (Cy Coleman, Carolyn Leigh), 2:45
9. "My Funny Valentine" (Richard Rodgers, Lorenz Hart), 5:33
10. "Old Devil Moon" (Burton Lane, Yip Harburg) / "Killer Joe" (Benny Golson), 4:54
11. "Make Someone Happy" (Jule Styne, Betty Comden, Adolph Green), 7:56
12. "I Can Let Go Now" (Michael McDonald), 2:40

Total album length = 55:44

== Personnel ==
=== Liane Carroll Trio ===
- Liane Carroll – piano and vocals
- Roger Carey – bass
- Mark Fletcher – drums

=== Other musicians ===
- Mark Bassey – trombone
- Mark Edwards – piano, electric piano and Hammond organ
- Mark Hodgson – bass
- Mark James – guitar
- Rob Leake – flute
- James McMillan – celesta, flugelhorn and trumpet
- Pete Murray – piano and strings
- Steve Pearce – bass
- Simon Purcell – piano
- Julian Siegel – tenor saxophone
- Chris Walden – strings
- Kirk Whalum – tenor saxophone
- Kenny Wheeler – flugelhorn

== Production and release ==
Up and Down was produced and mixed by James McMillan and was mastered by Dick Beetham. It was released on 27 June 2011 by Quietmoney Recordings and was distributed by Proper Records. The album's cover design was by Jack Ashdown. Photography by Lee Thompson.
