= The Right to Love (Liane Carroll album) =

Studio album by Liane Carroll
- Released: July 2017 (UK)
- Genre: Jazz
- Label: Quietmoney Recordings, distributed by Proper Records, CD (QMR0004CD)
- Producer: James McMillan

Liane Carroll chronology
Seaside (2015)	The Right to Love (2017)

Professional ratings
Review scores
Source	Rating
The Observer	4/5 stars
The Guardian	4/5 stars
Evening Standard	4/5 stars
The Irish Times	4/5 stars

The Right to Love is a studio album by English jazz pianist/vocalist Liane Carroll and her fourth collaboration with jazz trumpeter and record producer James McMillan. Released in July 2017 by Quietmoney Recordings and distributed by Proper Records, it received four-starred reviews in The Observer and the Evening Standard.

== Reception ==
Dave Gelly, reviewing The Right to Love in The Observer, gave the album four stars and said it displayed "a characteristic mixture of deceptive simplicity and emotional depth".

John Lewis, in a four-starred review for The Guardian, described it as "an elegant song suite... her elegant vocal improvisations eking new truths from familiar lyrics each time".

In another four-starred review, Jane Cornwell for the Evening Standard described the album as "bewitching" and "all the more affecting for the honesty with which she presents love songs written by everyone from Hoagy Carmichael to Jacques Brel and Tom Waits". Charlie Anderson, for London Jazz News, said that "Liane Carroll and producer James McMillan have struck gold once again with an impressive album".

Cormac Larkin, writing in The Irish Times, also gave the album four stars and said that "McMillan’s deft, uncliched arrangements provide soulful settings for a unique voice in UK jazz, a lithe, joyous, fearless one that can strike that elusive balance between style and substance".

== Track listing ==
1. Skylark
2. The Right To Love
3. It's A Fine Line
4. If You Go Away
5. You Don't Know What Love Is
6. Goin' Back
7. Lately
8. Georgia
9. In The Neighbourhood
10. I Get Along Without You Very Well

== Personnel ==
- Liane Carroll (piano, vocals)
- Mark Edwards (piano)
- Malcolm Edmonstone (piano)
- Mark Jaimes (guitars)
- Kirk Whalum (saxophone)
- Loz Garratt (bass)
- Roger Carey (bass)
- Ralph Salmins (drums)
- Russell Field (drums)
- James McMillan (trumpet)
