= Live at the Lampie =

Live album by Liane Carroll and Brian Kellock
- Released: 11 May 2009 (UK)
- Recorded: October 2008
- Genre: Jazz
- Label: Splash Point Records (SPR009CD)
- Producer: Neal Richardson

Liane Carroll chronology
Best Standard Issue (2008)	Live at the Lampie (2009)	Up and Down (2011)

Professional ratings
Review scores
Source	Rating
The Guardian	4/5 stars
Jazzwise	4/5 stars

Live at the Lampie is a live album of jazz standards by English jazz vocalist Liane Carroll and Scottish jazz pianist Brian Kellock. Produced by Neal Richardson, it was recorded at two gigs at the Blue Lamp pub in Aberdeen in October 2008 and released by Splash Point Records on 11 May 2009. It received four-starred reviews in The Guardian and Jazzwise and was funded and made possible by Creative Scotland. Funding application and subsequent tour management and recording (with Neil Richardson Splashpoint) by Thick Skinned Productions team, including Cathie Rae and Dave Gray.

== Reception ==
In a four-starred review, Guardian reviewer John Fordham said of Live at the Lampie, "Since Liane Carroll can loose off a jazz-singing broadside that might touch on Betty Carter and Bobby McFerrin (with soul-vocal asides including everyone from Aretha to Stevie Wonder), and Scottish piano virtuoso Kellock has a comparable range from Fats Waller to free-improv, the potential for repetition in this duo is low. Released from her singer/pianist responsibilities, Carroll has rarely sounded more spontaneous and relaxed."

For The Observer, Dave Gelly said: "Every phrase she sings sounds unstudied, fresh and somehow inevitable. It's best to experience her in person, but this live set comes close. There's none of her equally amazing piano playing here, but it's hard to think of a better matched keyboard companion than Brian Kellock, Scotland's finest jazz pianist and probably one of the best anywhere. The recording is basic and rather dry, but it catches the interplay between them very well".

Peter Quinn, writing in the May 2009 issue of Jazzwise, gave the album four stars and said: "There was never a scintilla of doubt that a meeting between Liane Carroll and Brian Kellock would produce something a little out of the ordinary, but the breathtaking scope of the duo's music-making on Live At The Lampie is jaw-dropping... Carroll spins endlessly inventive melodic lines in a vocal performance which, purely in terms of visceral excitement and fearless soloing, is unprecedented in her output".

Peter Bevan, for the Northern Echo, described it as "a gloriously passionate album" that captures the "tremendous rapport with each musician bringing out the best in the other".

== Track listing ==
1. "Love For Sale" (Cole Porter) 7:41
2. "Falling In Love With Love" (Richard Rodgers, Lorenz Hart) 5:20
3. "Alfie" (Burt Bacharach, Hal David) 9:31
4. "Lover Come Back To Me" (Sigmund Romberg, Oscar Hammerstein II) 6:46
5. "I Got It Bad (and That Ain't Good)" (Duke Ellington, Paul Francis Webster) 6:49
6. "Come Rain or Come Shine" (Harold Arlen, Johnny Mercer) 7:25
7. "Time After Time" (Sammy Cahn, Jule Styne) 9:05
8. "Witchcraft" (Cy Coleman, Carolyn Leigh) 6:43
9. "Come Rain or Come Shine" (alternate take) (Harold Arlen, Johnny Mercer) 6:11

Total album length = 59:03

== Personnel ==
1. Liane Carroll – voice
2. Brian Kellock – piano
3. David Gray – engineer
4. Neal Richardson – producer and executive producer
