= Whiz Kids (album) =

Studio album by Gary Burton Quintet
- Released: February 1987
- Recorded: June 1986
- Studio: Tonstudio Bauer; Ludwigsburg, W. Germany
- Genre: Jazz
- Length: 49:44
- Label: ECM 1329
- Producer: Manfred Eicher

Gary Burton chronology
Slide Show (1986)	Whiz Kids (1987)	The New Tango (1987)

Whiz Kids is an album by the Gary Burton Quintet, recorded in June 1986 and released on ECM February the following year. The quintet features saxophonist Tommy Smith and rhythm section Makoto Ozone, Steve Swallow and Martin Richards.

== Reception ==
Professional ratings
Review scores
Source	Rating
AllMusic	4/5 stars
DownBeat	3.5/5 stars
The Penguin Guide to Jazz Recordings	2.5/4 stars

The AllMusic review by Scott Yanow stated: "The repertoire (all obscurities) and post-bop solos have more fire than one would normally expect on a Gary Burton record, and there are plenty of colorful moments on this subtle but adventurous set."

== Track listing ==
All compositions by Makoto Ozone except as indicated

1. "The Last Clown" (Tommy Smith) - 8:57
2. "Yellow Fever" - 6:53
3. "Soulful Bill" (James Williams) - 8:11
4. "La divetta" - 8:34
5. "Cool Train" (Christian Jacob) - 6:46
6. "The Loop" (Chick Corea) - 8:10

== Personnel ==
- Gary Burton – vibraphone, marimba
- Tommy Smith – tenor saxophone
- Makoto Ozone – piano
- Steve Swallow – electric bass
- Martin Richards – drums
