= Seaside (Liane Carroll album) =

Studio album by Liane Carroll
- Released: 18 September 2015 (UK)
- Genre: Jazz
- Label: Linn Records (AKD 533)
- Producer: James McMillan

Liane Carroll chronology
Ballads (2013)	Seaside (2015)	The Right to Love (2017)

Professional ratings
Review scores
Source	Rating
The Guardian	4/5 stars
The Observer	4/5 stars
Mojo	4/5 stars

Seaside, a studio album by the English jazz pianist and vocalist Liane Carroll. It was released on 18 September 2015 on Linn Records.Joe Stilgoe wrote the title track.

== Reception ==
Reviewing the album for the Scottish national newspaper The Herald, Keith Bruce described it as "not only Carroll's best disc, but one of the finest non-classical releases in the Linn catalogue". Jim Burlong, writing for Jazz Views, said: "This is a wonderful album by one of our greatest jazz talents so full of quality and diversity. I doubt if there will be a better vocal based recording issued anywhere this year." Dave Gelly, who gave the album four stars in his review for The Observer, described the title track as "a haunting piece, beautifully arranged, which brings out her extraordinary ability to absorb the essence of a song and deliver it with such candour that you scarcely notice the artistry involved". John Fordham, in a four-star review for The Guardian, described Seaside as "casually expressive, unblinkingly honest, and often charmingly autobiographical" and said that only "the superb British standards-and-ballads singer Liane Carroll" could make an album like this one. In a four-star review for Mojo, Fred Dellar described it as "jazz of the highest quality". Peter Quinn, for Jazzwise, said: "Liane Carroll has that rare ability to meld effortless, often transcendent vocal and piano technique, with heart stopping emotion and soul bearing power. It should be no surprise then that her latest album, Seaside, combines all this with a savvy sophistication befitting of one of Britain’s finest jazz singers". Writing also on The Arts Desk website, Quinn described Carroll's album as one of 2015's "outstanding vocal jazz releases... a sublime 10-track love letter to her home town of Hastings". According to John Marley of Yorkshire daily newspaper The Press, it was the best 2015 vocal jazz album.

== Track listing ==
1. "Seaside" (Joe Stilgoe)
2. "Almost Like Being in Love (Lerner and Loewe)
3. "Bring Me Sunshine" (Arthur Kent/Sylvia Dee)
4. "It's Nobody's Fault but Mine" (Traditional: song first recorded by Blind Willie Johnson in 1927)
5. "Get Me Through December" (Gordie Sampson/Fred Lavery)
6. "Mercy Now" (Mary Gauthier) (recorded live)
7. "Wild Is the Wind" (Dimitri Tiomkin/Ned Washington)
8. "I Cover the Waterfront" (Johnny Green/Edward Heyman)
9. "My Ship" (Kurt Weill/ Ira Gershwin)
10. "For Those in Peril of the Sea" (William Whiting)

== Personnel ==
- Liane Carroll – vocals, piano
- Steve Pearce – acoustic bass
- Ian Thomas – drums
- James McMillan – flugelhorn, keyboards, percussion, bass, tenor horn, vibraphone
- Evan Jolly – trumpet, cornet, flugelhorn; brass band and brass arrangements
- Andy Wood – euphonium, trombone
- Julian Siegel – tenor saxophone
- Rob Leake – baritone and tenor saxophones
- Mark Edwards – piano
- Malcolm Edmonstone – piano; brass arrangements
- Mark Jaimes – acoustic and electric guitars
- Rob Luft – guitar

== Recording and production ==
The album was recorded in Hastings at Quietmoney Studios and produced by James McMillan. The cover photograph is by Carol Murphy.
