= Ballads (Liane Carroll album) =

Studio album by Liane Carroll
- Released: 15 April 2013 (UK)
- Genre: Jazz
- Label: Quietmoney Recordings, distributed by Proper Records, CD (QMR0002CD)
- Producer: James McMillan

Liane Carroll chronology
| Up and Down (2011) | Ballads (2013) | Seaside (2015) |

Professional ratings
Review scores
| Source | Rating |
|---|---|
| The Observer | 4/5 stars |
| The Guardian | 4/5 stars |
| London Evening Standard | 4/5 stars |
| LondonJazz | 4/5 stars |

Ballads is a studio album by English jazz pianist/vocalist Liane Carroll. It was released in April 2013 by Quietmoney Recordings and distributed by Proper Records.

The album was recorded in Hastings, Sussex, England and produced by James McMillan. It features Mark Edwards (piano), Gwilym Simcock (piano), Julian Siegel (bass clarinet) and Kirk Whalum (tenor saxophone) with orchestration and big band arrangements by Chris Walden, and includes Sophie Bancroft's song "Calgary Bay", performed with the Prague Philharmonic Orchestra.

The album received four-starred reviews in The Observer, The Guardian, the London Evening Standard and LondonJazz.

== Reception ==
In a four-starred review for The Guardian, John Fordham said: "Carroll's subtle pitching, tone colouration and jazz improviser's timing reinvent Here's to Life as a distilled understatement accompanied only by acoustic guitar; her earthiness is revealingly complemented by soft strings on Goodbye; and Mad About the Boy is so slow as to be prayer-like".

Peter Quinn, for Jazzwise Magazine, said "Ballads sees Liane nail 11 terrific songs in magisterial fashion... Widely recorded by instrumentalists (Cannonball Adderley, McCoy Tyner) and vocalists (Dinah Washington, Frank Sinatra) alike, 'Goodbye' has always been an exceptional song, but in Liane's hands it charts untold depths of emotion. This is one of the few indispensable vocal jazz albums of recent years".

Dave Gelly in The Observer, gave the album four stars and said of Carroll's performance on Ballads that "Surrounded by a changing cast of the best musicians around, illuminated by piquant arrangements, her singing takes on a new, glowing depth".

Chris Parker, reviewing the album for LondonJazz, said: "Carroll does not merely interpret these songs, she inhabits them, intimately confiding in her listeners so that everything from Todd Rundgren's 'Pretending to Care' and Carole King's 'Will You Still Love Me Tomorrow' to more conventional jazz standards ('Mad About the Boy', 'My One and Only Love') is imbued with unaffectedly sincere, heartfelt emotion".

Bruce Lindsay, for All About Jazz, described Carroll's performance of "Mad About The Boy" as "heartbreaking". "She sings as though she's aware of the futility of her desire but unwilling, or unable, to leave it behind. It shows the greatness of Coward's little ditty, the many emotions that the song can reveal – and the majesty of Carroll's voice. It's just one highlight of many on this exquisite album: Ballads is a classic-in-waiting".

Jack Massarick, in a four-starred review for the London Evening Standard, said; "[W]ith symphonic strings or just solo piano or guitar cushioning her tranquil path, there's abundant time to savour her tender side and the mature timbre of her voice".

== Track listing ==
1. Here's To Life (Artie Butler, Phyllis Molinary), 3:26
2. Goodbye (Gordon Jenkins) 5:22
3. Only The Lonely (Sammy Cahn, Jimmy Van Heusen, 3:05
4. Mad About The Boy (Noël Coward), 6:26
5. You've Changed (Bill Carey, Carl Fischer), 4:36
6. Pretending To Care (Todd Rundgren), 4:59
7. Calgary Bay (Sophie Bancroft), 4:48
8. My One And Only Love (Guy Wood, Robert Mellin), 3:41
9. Will You Still Love Me Tomorrow (Gerry Goffin, Carole King), 4:09
10. The Two Lonely People (Bill Evans, Carol Hall), 3:39
11. Raining in My Heart (Boudleaux Bryant, Felice Bryant), 3:22

== Personnel ==
- Liane Carroll: vocals, piano
- James McMillan: trumpet, vibes, keyboard
- Mark Edwards: piano, celeste
- Gwilym Simcock: piano
- Mark Jaimes: guitar
- Steve Pearce: bass
- Roger Carey: bass
- Mark Hodgson: bass
- Chris Hill: bass
- Mark Fletcher: drums
- Ralph Salmins: drums
- Kirk Whalum: tenor saxophone
- Simon Gardner: trumpet
- Noel Langley: trumpet
- Andy Gathercole: trumpet
- Andy Baxter: trumpet
- Pete Beachill: trombone
- Chris Dean: trombone
- Pete North: trombone
- Richard Whigley: trombone
- Sammy Maine: saxophone
- Patrick Clahar: saxophone
- Julian Siegel: saxophone
- Ben Castle: saxophone
- Jamie Talbot: saxophone
- City of Prague Philharmonic Orchestra

== Album cover ==
The album cover artwork is by Brighton-based artist, Lester Magoogan.
