= Syncopated City =

Studio album by London Elektricity
- Released: September 26, 2008 (CD); September 27, 2008 (Digital)
- Recorded: May 2007 – May 2008
- Genre: Drum and bass, electronica, liquid funk
- Length: 1:06:45
- Label: Hospital Records
- Producer: Tony Colman

London Elektricity chronology
Power Ballads (2005)	Syncopated City (2008)	Yikes! (2011)

Professional ratings
Review scores
Source	Rating
Resident Advisor	3.5/5 stars

Syncopated City is the fourth studio album and sixth album overall by liquid funk act London Elektricity. It was released on LP on September 1, 2008, on CD on the September 26, 2008, and via digital download a day later. Before release, several of the songs featured on the album were played on the Hospital Podcast presented by London Elektricity frontman Tony Colman.

The day after release, on September 27, 2008 London Elektricity performed at "World of Drum & Bass: The Big One" festival in Moscow, Russia, that was headlined by LTJ Bukem & MC Conrad.

The album features vocals by Tony Colman, with Liane Carroll taking lead vocals on 5 of the tracks. Elsa Hedberg (aka Elsa Esmeralda) and Tomahawk also feature as vocalists on "Just One Second" and "Attack Ships On Fire" respectively.

LP release lacks "South Eastern Dream", "Attack Ships on Fire", "Outnumbered" and "Syncopated City Revisited" tracks, but has a unique song named "Maybe I Was Wrong" featuring vocalist Pat Fulgoni.

"Maybe I Was Wrong" was later released on Japanese special edition CD on Nov 30, 2008 as one of the bonus tracks.

A promotional video was shot for "All Hell Is Breaking Loose" single.

On Sep 5, 2018 – the 10 year anniversary of the record's release – a remastered edition was released under the name "Syncopated City: The Director's Cut" on limited edition 7" record, popular streaming services and as a digital download from the Hospital Records online shop. The track list consists of the CD one + "Maybe I Was Wrong" from the Japan Special Edition. On Spotify alongside the release exists a commentary version with background on every single song and information on the original release and the re-release as told by Tony Colman (London Elektricity) himself.

== Track listing ==
=== LP (NHS142LPX) ===
1. Bare Religion – 6:07
2. Just One Second – 5:39
3. Sat Nav – 6:46
4. This Dark Matter – 7:05
5. USKA – 6:05
6. All Hell Is Breaking Loose – 4:44
7. Point of No Return – 5:52
8. Maybe I Was Wrong – 6:39

=== CD (NHS142CD) ===
1. Bare Religion – 6:27
2. This Dark Matter – 7:03
3. Just One Second – 5:38
4. All Hell Is Breaking Loose – 4:44
5. South Eastern Dream – 6:45
6. Attack Ships on Fire – 6:02
7. The Point of No Return – 5:55
8. Outnumbered – 5:16
9. USKA – 5:42
10. Sat Nav – 6:47
11. Syncopated City Revisited – 6:26

=== Japanese Special Edition (NHS142JAPAN) ===
1. Bare Religion – 6:27
2. This Dark Matter – 7:03
3. Just One Second – 5:38
4. All Hell Is Breaking Loose – 4:44
5. South Eastern Dream – 6:45
6. Attack Ships on Fire – 6:02
7. The Point of No Return – 5:55
8. Outnumbered – 5:16
9. USKA – 5:42
10. Sat Nav – 6:47
11. Syncopated City Revisited – 6:26
12. Jikan Wo Tomete (featuring Maki Nomiya) – 05:38
13. Maybe I Was Wrong – 06:52
14. Just One Second (Radio Edit) – 03:27
