= Power Ballads (London Elektricity album) =

Studio album by London Elektricity
- Released: October 11, 2005
- Genre: Drum and bass, liquid funk
- Length: 65:21
- Label: Hospital Records
- Producer: Tony Colman

London Elektricity chronology
Billion Dollar Gravy (2003)	Power Ballads (2005)	Syncopated City (2008)

Professional ratings
Review scores
Source	Rating
PopMatters	5/10
Prefix Mag	8/10

Power Ballads is the third studio album by London Elektricity, released in October 2005 through Hospital Records. It features vocals by Liane Carroll and MC Wrec.

== Track listing ==
No.	Title	Length
1.	"Out Of This World"	6:20
2.	"Vapour Trails"	6:32
3.	"Pussy Galore"	3:46
4.	"Watching You, Watching Me"	4:16
5.	"The Mustard Song"	5:06
6.	"Will To Love"	5:57
7.	"Hanging Rock"	6:27
8.	"I Don’t Understand"	4:37
9.	"The Strangest Secret In The World"	5:12
10.	"Remember The Future"	5:37
11.	"Power Ballad"	5:54
12.	"Far From The Shadows"	5:37
Total length:		65:21
