= Pull the Plug (London Elektricity album) =

Studio album by London Elektricity
- Released: November 21, 1998
- Genre: Drum and bass
- Length: 77:27
- Label: SMEJ Associated Records Hospital Records
- Producer: Tony Colman; Chris Goss

London Elektricity chronology
Pull the Plug (1998)	Billion Dollar Gravy (2003)

Pull the Plug is the debut album by drum and bass act London Elektricity, initially released in Japan in November 1998 through Sony Music Entertainment Japan Associated Records. An updated version of the album was released in the UK in June 1999 through Hospital Records.

The track "Rewind" was inspired by 4hero's mix of "Blackgold Of The Sun" and features vocals by Liane Carroll, a jazz-folk singer from Hastings, South England. She also appears on "Do You Believe", which is a cover version and tribute to the Webster Lewis 23-minute original.

== Japan release ==
Hospital Records first partnered with Sony Music Entertainment Japan in 1997 when they licensed a Japan release of the Hospital Records compilation "Ultrasound". Sony requested a radio single from London Electricity, so the duo took their instrumental song "Utrasound", the title track of said compilation, and added vocals to it to become "Rewind". This first version of "Rewind" charted in Japan and was included on the Japan release of Pull the Plug. The Australian release of Pull the Plug published by Creative Vibes is a re-release of the Japan version without the bonus track "I Resign".

=== Track listing ===
No.	Title	Length
1.	"Pull The Plug"	8:40
2.	"Shakedown"	6:17
3.	"Do You Believe" (vocals by Liane Carroll)	6:30
4.	"Song In The Key Of Knife"	11:38
5.	"Brother Ignoramus"	6:43
6.	"Land Sanction"	5:11
7.	"Superstructure" (vocals by Liane Carroll)	7:01
8.	"Rewind" (vocals by Liane Carroll)	7:36
9.	"Sister Stalking"	6:51
10.	"Dirty Dozen"	7:05
11.	"I Resign" (bonus track for japan only, vocals by Liane Carroll)	3:55
Total length:		77:27

== UK release ==
Pull the Plug

Studio album by London Elektricity
- Released: June 7, 1999
- Genre: Drum and bass
- Length: 73:47
- Label: Hospital Records
- Producer: Tony Colman; Chris Goss

London Elektricity chronology
Pull the Plug (1999)	Billion Dollar Gravy (2003)

Professional ratings
Review scores
Source	Rating
AllMusic	3/5 stars

7 months after the Japan release, Hospital Records released two different versions of Pull the Plug in the UK, one for CD and one for vinyl. The CD release features a few changes from the Japan release, the track order was changed and the bonus track "I Resign" was gone as well as "Land Sanction" and "Sister Stalking". A new track, "P.B.E. (Elektrical Storm)", was added alongside a new re-recorded version of "Rewind". The duo approached making the vinyl release as if they were making a different album, featuring different mixes and remixes of some tracks, as well as not including "P.B.E. (Elektrical Storm)".

=== CD track listing ===
No.	Title	Length
1.	"Song In The Key Of Knife"	11:25
2.	"P.B.E. (Elektrical Storm)" (vocals by John Forté)	9:44
3.	"Shakedown"	6:34
4.	"Rewind" (vocals by Liane Carroll)	11:33
5.	"Superstructure" (vocals by Liane Carroll)	7:00
6.	"Do You Believe" (vocals by Liane Carroll)	6:50
7.	"Pull The Plug"	8:11
8.	"Brother Ignoramus"	6:42
9.	"Dirty Dozen"	5:48
Total length:		73:47

=== Vinyl track listing ===
No.	Title	Length
1.	"Song In The Key Of Knife (Off My Feet Mix)"	9:56
2.	"Superstructure"	6:59
3.	"Pull The Plug (No-Batteries-Included Remix)"	9:30
4.	"Do You Believe" (vocals by Liane Carroll)	6:25
5.	"Rewind (Dub Mix)"	10:43
6.	"Shakedown"	6:11
7.	"Dirty Dozen (Landmass Remix)"	8:32
8.	"Brother Ignoramus (Dumbstruck Remix)"	7:12
Total length:		65:28
