= Murray McLachlan (musician) =

Scottish concert pianist (born 1965)

- Born: 6 January 1965 (age 61) (Scotland) Dundee, United Kingdom
- Genres: Classical
- Instrument: Piano
- Website: https://murraymclachlan.co.uk/

Murray McLachlan (born 6 January 1965) is a British concert pianist, born in Dundee, Scotland.

His repertoire includes over 40 concertos and he has appeared as concerto soloist with many leading UK orchestras. He gave the last concerto performance of the 20th century in the Royal Albert Hall when he played Gershwin's Rhapsody in Blue at the 'Millennium Proms' with the BBC Concert Orchestra under Christopher Warren-Green. In the 2000–2001 season he made his debut as a conductor, directing the Mozart Festival Orchestra on a national tour.

His overseas engagements have included recitals in the U.S., Scandinavia and South Africa, as well as tours of the Soviet Union, Germany, Belgium, the Netherlands, and the Far East. In 1997 he was awarded a knighthood by the Order of St John of Jerusalem in recognition of his services to music in Malta.

He has recorded several cycles of Russian music: Prokofiev, Kabalevsky, Khachaturian, Tcherepnin, Weinberg, Shchedrin, and Myaskovsky. His discography also includes music by Shostakovich, Hamish MacCunn, Erik Chisholm, John Ramsden Williamson and Marcus Blunt and a concerto based on sketches left by Grieg for a second piano concerto. He also released a cross-over album with jazz saxophonist Tommy Smith.

During the 1997–98 season he undertook a series of fifty Chopin recitals featuring the four Ballades in aid of the Marie Curie Cancer Fund's Golden Jubilee. He has given tours for North West Arts, the Scottish Arts Council and the British Council. Broadcasts include recitals, concertos and chamber music for the BBC as well as Classic FM, and recordings of Russian repertoire for Dutch and Belarusian television.

McLachlan premiered Jeremy Thurlow's piano concerto, and has given first performances of works by other composers, including Ronald Stevenson, Charles Camilleri, Michael Parkin, and Beethoven. His recording of John McLeod's piano music was selected as Record of the Week in the Glasgow Herald and his recording of 'Piano Music from Scotland' was awarded a rosette in the Penguin Guide to Compact Discs.

His discography includes over thirty commercial recordings on the Olympia, Linn, Divine Art, Diversions, Claremont, and Redbrook labels.

As Head of Keyboard at Chetham's School of Music, McLachlan is also a teacher and regularly gives masterclasses around the UK.

McLachlan is also an active member of EPTA Europe, or European Piano Teachers Association, an organization that aims to raise music teaching standards across the United Kingdom. This organization has parallels in its profile to MTNA, or Music Teacher's National Association, of the United States. McLachlan was appointed as a "Patron and Trustee" from June 19, 2023, and has been an editor of the EPTA Magazine in past years.

McLachlan is also an outspoken advocate for smaller sized keyboards and has expressed support for organizations such as PASK, Pianists for Alternatively Sized Keyboards.
