= Brian Kellock =

Scottish jazz pianist (1962–2025)

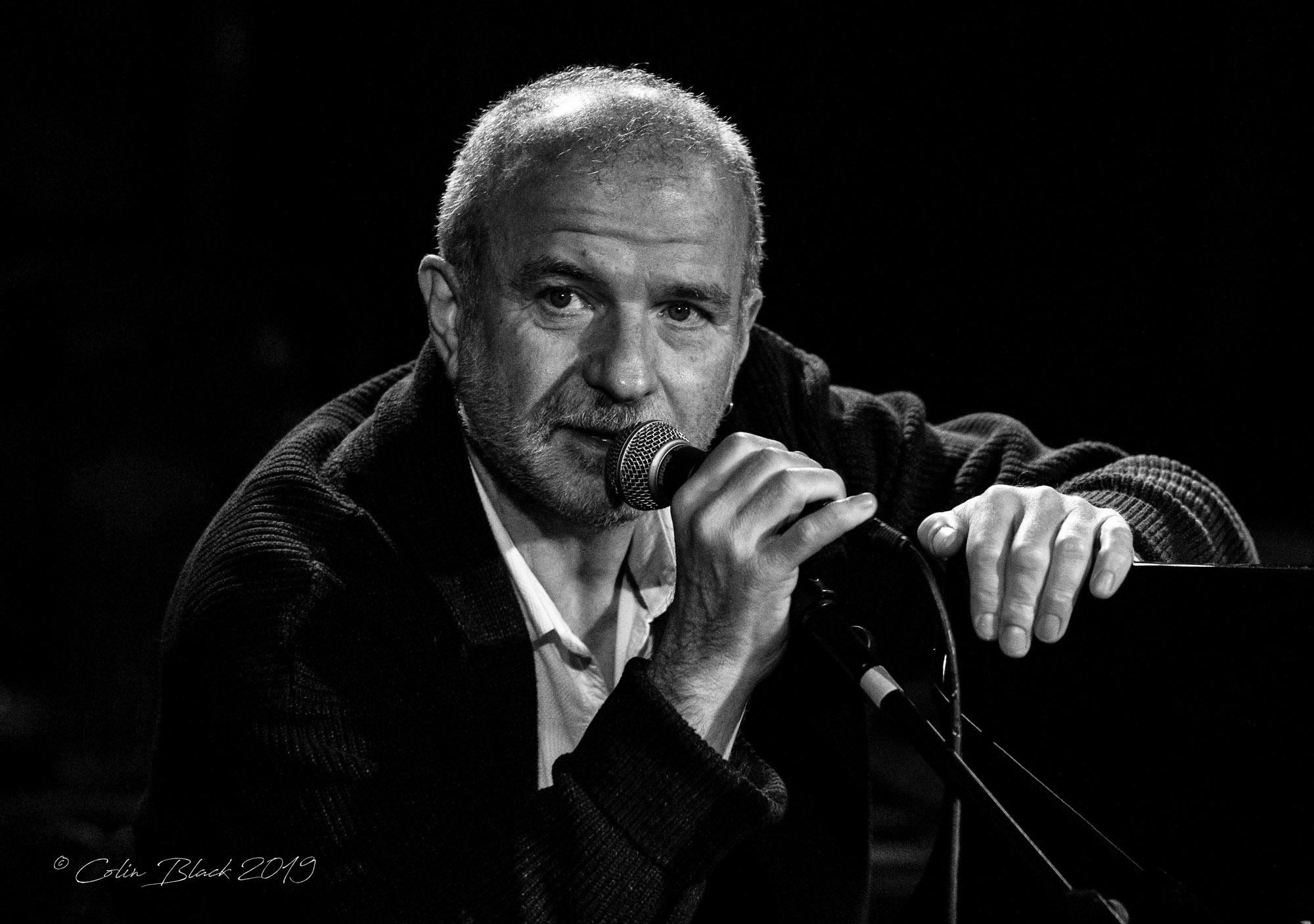
- Kellock in 2019, by Colin Black

Background information
- Born: 28 December 1962
- Died: 27 May 2025 (aged 62)
- Genres: Jazz
- Instrument: Piano

Brian Kellock (28 December 1962 – 27 May 2025) was a Scottish jazz pianist.

== Life and career ==
Born in Edinburgh on 28 December 1962, Kellock graduated with a B Music (Hons) from the University of Edinburgh in 1986. He then established his position as one of the top piano players in the UK jazz scene, working with Herb Geller, Sheila Jordan, and Art Farmer.

From 1995, Kellock was a member of Australian trumpeter James Morrison's Band.

His main project was his own Trio, which first appeared as the rhythm section for seminal Scottish band, the John Rae Collective, since 1988. This line-up, featuring Kenny Ellis on bass and John Rae on drums, was performing together ever since. In 1998, the band released their first recording together – Something's Got To Give – a set of standards popularised by Fred Astaire.

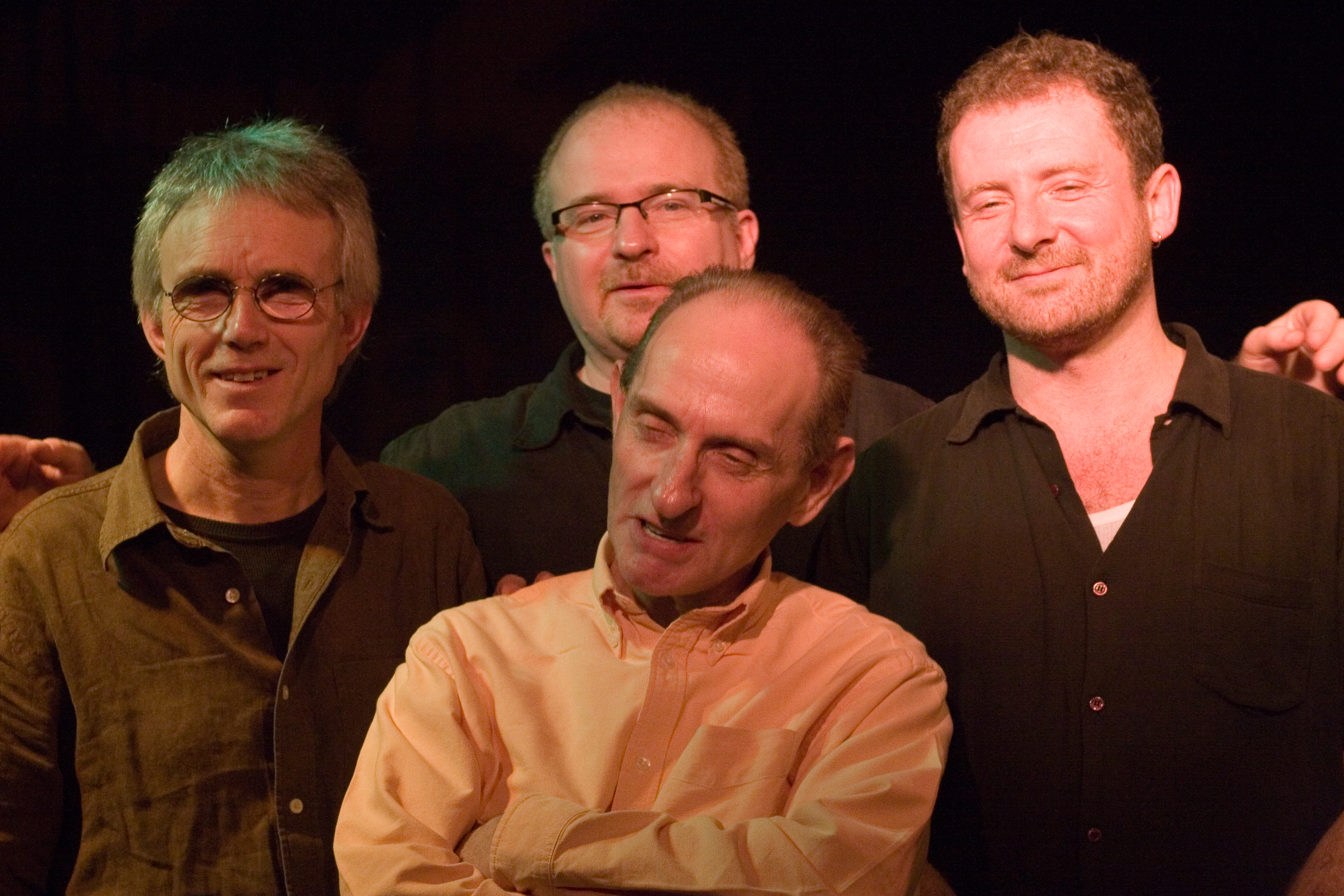
Brian Kellock trio with Bobby Wellins (front), The Blue Lamp, Aberdeen 2006

Some of Kellock's popular songs played include: "You Must Believe in Spring", "Rhapsody in Blue", "The Way You Look Tonight", "Tokyo Express", "Let it Snow, Let it Snow, Let it Snow", "Lennies Pennies", "In the Bleak Midwinter", and "Young and Foolish".

Kellock died on 27 May 2025, at the age of 63.

== Selected discography ==
=== As leader/co-leader ===
Year recorded	Title	Label	Notes
1999	Hollywood Portraits	HEP Jazz	Duo, co-led with Herb Geller (alto sax, soprano sax)
1998	Something's Got to Give	Caber	Trio, with Kenny Ellis (bass), John Rae (drums)
1999	Hollywood Portraits	HEP Jazz	Duo, co-led with Herb Geller (alto sax, soprano sax)
1999	The Crossing	Caber	Duo, co-led with Tam White (vocals)
2000	Live at Henry's	Caber	Trio; with Kenny Ellis (bass), John Rae (drums); in concert
2002	Bezique	Spartacus	Duo, co-led with Tommy Smith (tenor sax); in concert
2004	Symbiosis	Spartacus	Duo, co-led with Tommy Smith (tenor sax)
2008	The Nine Mile Burn Sessions	Thick Skinned	Solo, and duo with Julian Arguelles (sax)
2009	Live at the Lampie	Splash Point	Duo, co-led with Liane Carroll (vocals); in concert
2019	Bidin’ My Time	Self released	Solo
2009 (released 2020)	Think About It!	Thick Records NZ	As BK3, trio, with Kenny Ellis (bass), John Rae (drums)

=== As sideman ===
- John Rae – Where The Wild Clematis Grow
  - John Rae: Drums
  - Brian Kellock: Piano
  - Patrick Bleakley: Bass
  - Recorded 2020 – Thick Records NZ
- John Rae's Celtic Feet
  - John Rae: Drums
  - Eilidh Shaw: Fiddle
  - Simon Thoumire: Concertina
  - Phil Bancroft: Sax
  - Brian Kellock: Piano
  - Mario Caribé: Bass
  - Recorded 1999 – Caber 010
- Sylvia Rae – Close Enough
  - Sylvia Rae: Vocals
  - Brian Kellock: Piano
  - Warren Vaché: Trumpet
  - Kenny Ellis: Bass
  - Ronnie Rae: Bass (Tk3)
  - John Rae: Drums
  - Recorded 2002 – VocalbA vocl 001 (from caber music)
- Hue & Cry – jazznotjazz
  - Michael Brecker: Tenor Sax
  - Mike Stern: Guitar
  - Randy Brecker: Trumpet
  - Tommy Smith: Tenor Sax
  - Danny Gottlieb: Drums
  - Brian Kellock: Piano
  - Recorded 1996 – Linn Records AKD 057
- Spike Robinson – Stairway To The Stars
  - Spike Robinson – Tenor Saxophone
  - Brian Kellock – Piano
  - Ronnie Rae – String Bass
  - John Rae – Drums
  - Recorded at the Queen's Hall, Edinburgh 1990 – HEP Jazz – HEP CD 2049
- Janusz Carmello – Portrait
  - Janusz Carmello: Trumpet & Pocket Trumpet
  - Brian Kellock: Piano
  - John Hartley: String Bass
  - Tony McLennan: Drums
  - Jimmy Wood: Alto Sax
  - Phil Bancroft: Tenor Sax
  - Gordon Cruickshank: Bar Sax
  - Keith Hutton: Trombone
  - Recorded 1989 HEP Records – HEP CD 2044
- Nigel Clark Quintet – Worldwide Sound
  - Nigel Clark: Guitars
  - Tim Garland: Saxophones
  - Brian Kellock: Piano/Keyboards
  - Ewen Vernel: Bass
  - Mike Bradley: Drums
  - Recorded 1996 Sienna Records SNA 1001
- Tam White/Boz Burrell – Groove Connection
  - Tam White: Voice
  - Boz Burrell: Basses
  - Brian Kellock: Piano/Keyboards
  - Neil Warden: Guitar
  - John Henderson: Drums
  - Russel Cowieson: Tenor Sax
  - Tom McNiven: Trumpet
  - Alec Phillips: Trombone
  - Recorded 2000 Catalyst Records CD2002.
