= Marcus Blunt =

British composer (1947–2022)

Marcus Blunt (31 December 1947 – 21 July 2022) was a British composer.

Born in Birmingham, Blunt studied composition and clarinet at the University College of Wales, Aberystwyth, graduating in 1970. After a variety of jobs he settled in Derby from 1976 as a teacher of woodwind instruments. In 1990 he and his wife Maureen moved to Dumfriesshire where he focused on composing full time.

His music, mostly instrumental, has been performed in Britain and internationally. His influences range from Scarlatti to Scriabin and Tippett, but he also developed his own distinct harmonic language, based on an ascending series of pitches. This is most evident in his Piano Sonata No 3 The Life Force of 1988 (taken up by performers such as Kathryn Stott, John Lenehan and Murray McLachlan), and in the Piano Concerto (1992-5, but not premiered until 2005). He also uses diminishing interval chords in the Piano Preludes and elsewhere. The prizewinning Fantasy on SCRiABin for piano (1995), is one of three Fantasies composed using themes based on the initials of named influences.

The two symphonies took a while to find their final form. No 1 was composed between 1989 and 1997. No 2 started life in 1991 as the Octet The Throstle-Nest in Spring, was refashioned as a symphony for a modest sized orchestra in 2002, and was further revised in 2016.

Recordings include the solo piano music, including the three piano sonatas, seven preludes and three Fantasies, played by Murray McLachlan (2006, reissued by Divine Art, 2014), the Two Serenades (2009) for violin, clarinet, cello & piano (Nimbus, 2012), and the Symphony No. 2, Piano Concerto, Bassoon Concertino (2016) and Aspects of Saturn (1989, revised 2016) for string orchestra (Divine Art, 2018).

Blunt died after a long illness on 21 July 2022, at the age of 75. His publishers are Modus Music and Emerson Edition.
