= Mira (album) =

Studio album by Arild Andersen
- Released: January 28, 2014
- Recorded: December 2012
- Studios: Rainbow Studio; Oslo, Norway
- Genre: Jazz
- Length: 62:50
- Label: ECM 2307
- Producer: Manfred Eicher

Arild Andersen chronology
Celebration (2012)	Mira (2014)	The Rose Window (2016)

Mira is an album by bassist and composer Arild Andersen recorded in December 2012 and released on ECM in January 2014. The trio, featuring Tommy Smith on saxophone and shakuhachi and Paolo Vinaccia on drums, had also previously recorded together on 2008's Live at Belleville.

== Reception ==
Professional ratings
Review scores
Source	Rating
AllMusic	4/5 stars
The Guardian	3/5 stars
All About Jazz	4.5/5 stars

The AllMusic review by Thom Jurek states "On Mira, this trio's musical language has evolved to express a different dialect, one full of inquiry, intelligence, and soul."

The Guardian's John Fordham said "It's a more muted set than 2007's Live at Belleville, and softer than the band sounds in concert, but there's plenty of contrast.... The sheer depth and lustre of this trio's sound can invite you to start purring in grateful imitation."

All About Jazz reviewer John Kelmann said, "Contrasting the greater energy of Live at Belleville, the studio-born Mira may find Andersen, Smith and Vinaccia in a generally more pensive mood, but that doesn't mean there aren't moments where the trio simmers with collective heat.... A long overdue and equally impressive follow-up—albeit for different reasons—Mira presents this trio in a different light to its 2008 debut; still, it's no surprise that Andersen, Vinaccia and Smith prove as capable of darker intents as they do more energetic exchanges."

== Track listing ==
All compositions by Arild Andersen except where noted.

1. "Bygone" - 6:37
2. "Blussy" - 6:01
3. "Alfie" (Burt Bacharach, Hal David) - 7:06
4. "Rossetti" - 5:37
5. "Reparate" - 8:34
6. "Raijin" (Tommy Smith, Paolo Vinaccia) - 3:11
7. "Le Saleya" - 5:21
8. "Kangiten" - 1:38
9. "Mira" - 7:06
10. "Eight and More" - 6:05
11. "Stevtone" (Arild Andersen, Kirsten Bråten Berg) - 5:33

== Personnel ==
- Arild Andersen – bass
- Tommy Smith – tenor saxophone, shakuhachi
- Paolo Vinaccia – drums
