= Sara Colman =

British musician

- Born: Bristol
- Genres: Jazz
- Occupation: Musician
- Website: www.saracolman.com

Sara Colman is a British jazz singer.

== Life and career ==
Colman was born in Bristol. She studied at the Royal Birmingham Conservatoire.

For ten years, until c. 2008, she was part of vocal group The Passion, with Jacqui Dankworth and Liane Carroll.

== Discography ==
=== As leader ===
- What We're Made Of (Stoney Lane, 2018)
- Ink on a Pin – a Celebration of Joni Mitchell (Stoney Lane, 2021)

=== The Passion ===
- One Good Reason (Qnote, 2008) – with Jacqui Dankworth and Liane Carroll
