= James McMillan (trumpeter) =

British jazz trumpeter and record producer

James McMillan is a British jazz trumpeter, record producer and the founder and owner of the record label, Quietmoney Recordings. He performed on and produced Liane Carroll's albums Up and Down, Ballads and The Right To Love, all of which were released on his Quietmoney label, and also her 2015 album Seaside.

He was the conductor for the United Kingdom entry in the 1998 Eurovision Song Contest.
