= Liane Carroll =

English vocalist, pianist and keyboardist

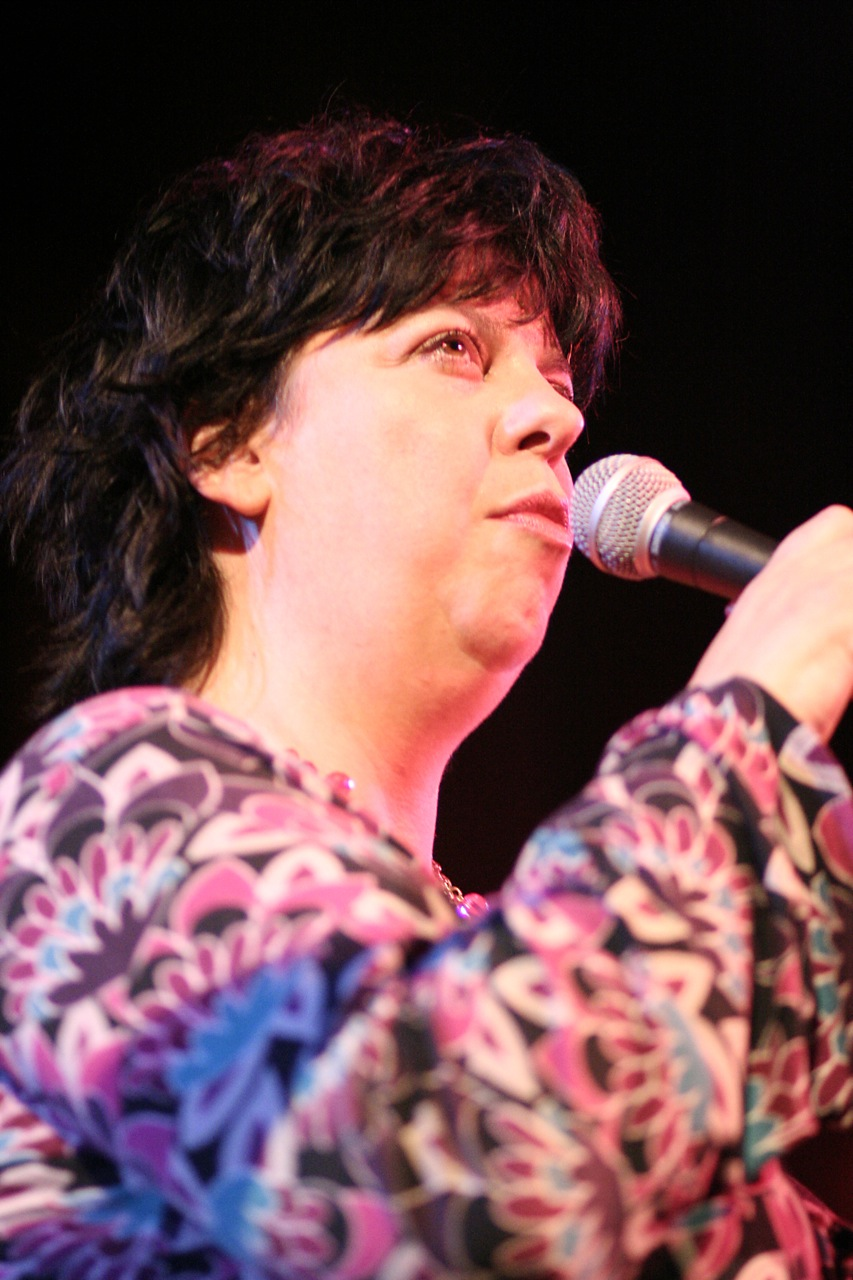
- Carroll at Union Chapel, Islington, London, November 2007

Background information
- Born: 9 February 1964 (age 62); London, England
- Genre: Jazz
- Occupations: Musician, singer
- Instruments: Vocals; piano; keyboards
- Years active: 1980–present
- Labels: Quietmoney, Proper, Splash Point, Hospital, Wah Wah 45s
- Website: lianecarroll.co.uk/music.html

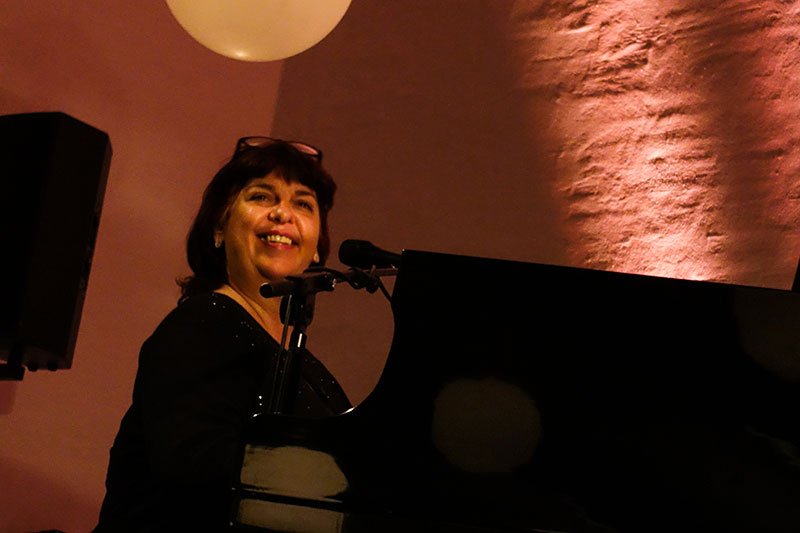
Carroll at Jazzy Days in Denmark, 2016

Liane Carroll (born 9 February 1964) is an English jazz vocalist, pianist and keyboardist.

== Early life ==
Carroll's parents were semi-professional singers who met and sang at the Country Club in Eastbourne. She grew up in a musical household (Note: In a short film by Sarah Linklater about Liane Carroll and her weekly performances at Porters, a small pub in Hastings, Carroll said that her parents were both singers and her grandmother had played the piano. Sarah Linklater for Hidden Gems (May 2011). "Liane Carroll (video)" – via Vimeo.) in Hastings and in south London. She started learning the piano at the age of three, began composing at the age of eight, and has been a professional singer, pianist and composer since she was 15.

== Career ==
In 1998 Carroll joined Trevor Watts' Moiré Music band and toured overseas with them. She became a respected session musician and also worked in bands under Dave Holdsworth, Gerry Rafferty, Jerry Donohue and Long John Baldry.

Carroll formed her own trio and recorded for Jazz Art, Bridge, and Ronnie Scott's Jazz House.

From 1996 to 2002, Carroll worked with singer-songwriter-guitarist Peter Kirtley, with whom she composed many songs. They appeared together on a charity single for Brazilian street children, on which Carroll's backing singer was Paul McCartney.

From 1996 onwards Carroll started working with Hospital Records. In 2003 she toured internationally with a band formed by Hospital Records' owner Tony Colman, playing at the Brazilian Electro Dance Music Festival in Brasília. In the early 2000s she began recording for the Splash Point label, releasing a series of recordings that embraced jazz, R&B and the singer-songwriter tradition. From 2005 onwards, she decided to focus on her jazz work.

Carroll has worked with many artists ranging from Paul McCartney (Note: Together with Paul McCartney, she performed with the Peter Kirtley Band on the 1998 charity CD single "Little Children".) and Gerry Rafferty (Note: She performed with Gerry Rafferty on his 1992 album, On a Wing and a Prayer. "Gerry Rafferty album: On a Wing and a Prayer, 1992". Music World.) to Ladysmith Black Mambazo. She has also performed as lead vocalist and Wurlitzer keyboardist for the drum and bass band London Elektricity. She is a regular performer at Ronnie Scott's Jazz Club and the 606 Club in London, and has made several albums. In addition to performing, Carroll also teaches at jazz summer schools in the UK and Europe, and conducts workshops.

== Broadcasting ==
In 2013 Carroll was a guest on Alex Horne's BBC Radio 4 comedy show Alex Horne Presents the Horne Section.

== Awards and recognition ==
In 2005 Carroll won two awards in the BBC Jazz Awards: Best Vocalist and Best of Jazz. In 2006 she won the Marston Pedigree Jazz Award for best vocalist. On 13 May 2008, Andy Burnham MP, then Secretary of State for Culture, Media and Sport, presented her with the 2008 award for Jazz Musician of the Year in the Parliamentary Jazz Awards. Her album Up and Down won in the Jazz Album of the Year category at the Parliamentary Jazz Awards in May 2012. In 2016 she won a Gold award from the British Academy of Songwriters, Composers and Authors (BASCA).

Jazz critic Dave Gelly of The Observer described Carroll as "one of the most stylistically flexible pianists around, with a marvellous, slightly husky singing voice". According to John Fordham of The Guardian, she is "a powerful, soul-inflected performer with an Ella Fitzgerald-like improv athleticism and an emotional frankness on ballads". Peter Quinn of Jazzwise said, "Liane Carroll has that rare ability to meld effortless, often transcendent vocal and piano technique, with heart stopping emotion and soul bearing power." Nick Hasted of The Independent said she is "still frustratingly little-known" but "one of Britain's most emotionally visceral and accomplished singers".

Carroll's five albums since 2009 have each received four-starred reviews in The Guardian or The Observer.

== Personal life ==
Carroll lives in Hastings with her husband Roger Carey, bassist in the Liane Carroll Trio. She has a daughter, Abby.

== Discography ==
=== Dave Holdsworth-Liane Carroll Quartet ===
Album	Record label	Release date	Notes
Ten Day Simon	Cadillac	8 May 1990	With Dave Holdsworth on trumpet, this album features original compositions and jazz standards

=== Liane Carroll ===
Album	Record label	Release date	Notes
That's Life (Liane Carroll and Roger Carey)	Jazz Art	CD (JART CD1) in 1991	
Clearly	Bridge	1 October 1995	Features Dave Mattacks (drums) and Roger Carey (bass), with a guest appearance by trumpeter Dick Pearce
Dolly Bird	Ronnie Scott's Jazz House	18 August 1997	Recorded live at Ronnie Scott's Jazz Club. Features Peter Kirtley (guitar, vocals), Steve Lamb (bass guitar) and Greg Leppard (drums)
Son of Dolly Bird	Ronnie Scott's Jazz House	28 January 2002	Recorded live at Ronnie Scott's Jazz Club in January 2001. Features Steve Lamb (bass guitar), Greg Leppard (drums) and special guest Julian Siegel (tenor saxophone)
Billy No Mates	Splash Point	CD (SPR001CD) on 14 September 2003	Carroll's first solo album. Includes four original songs by Carroll: "Three Sheets to the Wind", "Fly Little Bird", "Dublin Morning" and "Billy No Mates"
Standard Issue	Splash Point	CD (SPR003CD) on 3 October 2005	Recorded live on 5 June 2005 at Studio 1, Abbey Road Studios. Features the Liane Carroll Trio (Roger Carey on bass guitar and Greg Leppard on drums) and guests Ian Shaw (vocals), John Parricelli (guitar) and Bobby Wellins (tenor saxophone) (Note: Reviewing Standard Issue for Jazzwise magazine, Peter Quinn said: "her arrangement of Janis Ian's 'At Seventeen' is close to musical perfection." Peter Quinn. "Liane Carroll: Standard Issue". Jazzwise.)
Slow Down	Splash Point	CD (SPR004CD) on 24 September 2007	Solo album; Ian Shaw guests on one track (Note: As well as jazz standards, and numbers by singer-songwriters including Laura Nyro, Donovan and Tom Waits, Slow Down includes an original song, "You Can't Slow My Heart Down", co-written by Liane Carroll with Peter Kirtley. Reviewing Slow Down for BBC Music, Kathryn Shackleton said: "On Slow Down Liane sings her way through the whole spectrum from jazz diva to fragile victim. Van Heusen and Cahn's 'All The Way' and Duke Ellington's 'In My Solitude' are remade as torch songs, with vulnerability oozing out of every verse, while 'Lazy Afternoon' perfectly captures her molasses low tones and silken high ones – her sparse electric piano accompaniment creating a brooding, hypnotic tension." Kathryn Shackleton (4 January 2008). "It doesn't just tug at your heart strings, it rips them out..." BBC Music.)
Liane Live DVD	Splash Point	DVD (SPR007DVD) on 4 February 2008	Featuring concert by the Liane Carroll Trio (Roger Carey on bass and Mark Fletcher on drums) at the Brecon Jazz Festival 2006; Ian Shaw guests on one track (Note: Filmed by the BBC, the DVD is introduced by Julian Joseph.)
One Good Reason	Qnote, distributed by Universal Music	CD (QNT 10110) on 21 July 2008	Recorded in 2002, as part of "The Passion" with Jacqui Dankworth and Sara Colman (Note: Reviewing One Good Reason for All About Jazz, Dave Major said that "at no time does one voice truly overpower the trio. Even in dense, concerted passages, you can appreciate each subtle nuance, change in vibrato or balance". Dave Major (26 September 2008). "CD/LP/Track Review: The Passion: One Good Reason (2008)". All About Jazz.)
Break Even (with John Etheridge)	Dekkor	CD (RCD 027) on 24 November 2008	With Hammond organist Pete Whittaker and drummer Mark Fletcher (Note: Guardian reviewer John Fordham said of Break Even, "Carroll's confidence in the expressiveness of the smallest utterance gives her an irresistible eloquence, as strong at low volumes as it is at full throttle". John Fordham (13 February 2009). "John Etheridge/Liane Carroll: Break Even". The Guardian.)
Best Standard Issue	SSG Entertainment	CD (DC 9648) on 23 December 2008	This album was released in Germany. It has 17 tracks: duration 74 mins
Live at the Lampie (with Brian Kellock)	Splash Point	CD (SPR009CD) on 11 May 2009	Recorded live at The Blue Lamp pub in Aberdeen (Note: Guardian reviewer John Fordham said of Live at the Lampie, "Since Liane Carroll can loose off a jazz-singing broadside that might touch on Betty Carter and Bobby McFerrin (with soul-vocal asides including everyone from Aretha to Stevie Wonder), and Scottish piano virtuoso Kellock has a comparable range from Fats Waller to free-improv, the potential for repetition in this duo is low. Released from her singer/pianist responsibilities, Carroll has rarely sounded more spontaneous and relaxed." John Fordham (14 August 2011). "Liane Carroll/Brian Kellock: Live at the Lampie". The Guardian.)
Up and Down	Quietmoney, distributed by Proper Records	CD (QMR0001CD) on 27 June 2011	Recorded in London, Hastings, Brighton, Prague and Memphis, Tennessee, it features Kenny Wheeler, Kirk Whalum, Julian Siegel and James McMillan as guest soloists. (Note: Guardian reviewer John Fordham said of Up and Down, "Singer/pianist Carroll is a world-class act, but this is the first recording to capture the full range of her expressiveness. Up and Down embraces intimate voice/piano performances, orchestra-backed extravaganzas and jazz jams with soloists of the pedigree of Kenny Wheeler and Julian Siegel." John Fordham; et al. (19 May 2011). "F&M Playlist". The Guardian.)
Ballads	Quietmoney, distributed by Proper Records	CD (QMR0002CD) on 15 April 2013	Recorded in Hastings, it features Mark Edwards (piano), Gwilym Simcock (piano), Julian Siegel (bass clarinet) and Kirk Whalum (tenor saxophone) with orchestration and big band arrangements by Chris Walden and includes Sophie Bancroft's song "Calgary Bay", performed with the Prague Philharmonic Orchestra.
Seaside	Linn	CD (AKD 533) on 18 September 2015	Recorded in Hastings, this studio album received four-starred reviews in The Guardian, The Observer and Mojo magazine. The title track was written by Joe Stilgoe
The Right to Love	Quietmoney, distributed by Proper Records	CD (QMR0004) on July 2017	Produced by James McMillan, this album received four-starred reviews in The Guardian, The Observer and the London Evening Standard.

=== London Elektricity ===
Album	Record label	Release date	Notes
Pull the Plug	Hospital	CD (NHS12CD) on 7 June 1999	Liane Carroll provides vocals on two of the tracks
Billion Dollar Gravy	Hospital	CD (NHS56CD) on 26 May 2003	Liane Carroll provides vocals on some of the tracks
Live Gravy (live DVD album)	Hospital	DVD (NHS72DVD) on 24 May 2004	A live concert at The Jazz Café, London, with two extra songs from London Elektricity's autumn 2003 tour, released on DVD
Power Ballads	Hospital	CD (NHS95CD) on 3 October 2005	Liane Carroll provides vocals on four of the tracks
Medical History	Hospital	MP3 album (NHSDL06) on 6 December 2006	Liane Carroll takes lead vocals on five of the tracks
Syncopated City	Hospital	LP (NHS142LPX) on 1 September 2008; CD (NHS142CD) on 26 September 2008; Japanese Special Edition (NHS142JAPAN) with bonus tracks on 30 November 2008	Liane Carroll takes lead vocals on five of the tracks
Are We There Yet?	Hospital	LP (NHS280LP) on 6 November 2015; CD (NHS280) on 6 November 2015	Liane Carroll takes lead vocals on "Why Are We Here?"

=== PTH Projects featuring Liane Carroll ===
Single	Record label	Release date	Notes
"Pretend Paradise"	Wah Wah 45s	12-inch single (WAH1209) on 26 June 2006	Liane Carroll performs on the track "Pretend Paradise", which is coupled with "Thin Air" featuring Lara Vane
"Pretend Paradise" (remix)	Wah Wah 45s	12-inch single (WAH12012) on 6 June 2007	Track listing – Track A: "Pretend Paradise" (Parta Herois De Tempo Mix); Track B: "What The Sun Brings"

=== Chris Garrick and John Etheridge with Liane Carroll ===
Album	Record label	Release date	Notes
When The World Stopped For Snow	Flying Blue Whale Records	Album (FLY 8) in 2013	Liane Carroll sings on three of the tracks

=== Compilation albums ===
Album	Record label	Release date	Notes
Hospital Accapellas	Hospital	CD (NHS171) on 12 July 2010	Features various Hospital Records artists. Includes one track by Liane Carroll ("The Trap" [A cappella]). She is also lead vocalist on five of the six London Elektricity tracks
