= Billion Dollar Gravy =

Studio album by London Elektricity
- Released: 2003
- Genre: Liquid funk
- Label: Hospital Records
- Producer: Tony Colman

London Elektricity chronology
| Pull the Plug (1999) | Billion Dollar Gravy (2003) | Power Ballads (2005) |

Professional ratings
Review scores
| Source | Rating |
|---|---|
| AllMusic | 4/5 stars |
| The Guardian | 3/5 stars |

Billion Dollar Gravy is the second studio album by drum and bass act London Elektricity, released in 2003. The album is known for its usage of live musicians, such as the Jungle Drummer (drums), Liane Carroll (jazz vocals), Andy Waterworth (upright bass), Robert Owens (vocals), and others, much like London Elektricity's debut, Pull the Plug.

== Track listing ==
1. "Billion Dollar Gravy" – 6:23
2. "Different Drum" – 7:23
3. "Fast Soul Music" – 6:22
4. "To Be Me" – 6:16
5. "The Great Drum + Bass Swindle" – 7:09
6. "Cum Dancing" – 7:15
7. "Main Ingredient" – 4:35
8. "Harlesden" – 5:44
9. "My Dreams" – 7:24
10. "Born to Synthesise" – 6:42
11. "Syncopated City" – 5:57
