= Yikes! =

Studio album by London Elektricity
- Released: April 25, 2011
- Length: 63:03
- Label: Hospital Records
- Producer: Tony Colman

London Elektricity chronology
Syncopated City (2008)	Yikes! (2011)	Are We There Yet? (2015)

Professional ratings
Review scores
Source	Rating
AllMusic	3.5/5 stars
Radio Monash	4/5 stars

Yikes! is the fifth studio album by London Elektricity. It was released in April 2011 through Hospital Records. The album features vocals by Elsa Esmeralda and Pat Fulgoni.

"Round the World In a Day" features Pendulum's Kevin Sawka on drums.

== Track listing ==
No.	Title	Length
1.	"Elektricity Will Keep Me Warm (feat. Elsa Esmeralda)"	3:30
2.	"Meteorites (feat. Elsa Esmeralda)"	6:09
3.	"Had A Little Fight"	6:01
4.	"The Plan That Cannot Fail"	6:12
5.	"Yikes!"	6:54
6.	"Fault Lines (feat. Elsa Esmeralda)"	4:32
7.	"U Gotta B Crazy"	4:33
8.	"Round The World In A Day (feat. Elsa Esmeralda)"	5:47
9.	"Love The Silence (feat. Elsa Esmeralda)"	5:55
10.	"Flesh Music"	6:45
11.	"Invisible Worlds (feat. Elsa Esmeralda)"	6:45
Total length:		63:03
