= Tommy Smith (saxophonist) =

Scottish jazz saxophonist, composer, and educator

Tommy Smith OBE
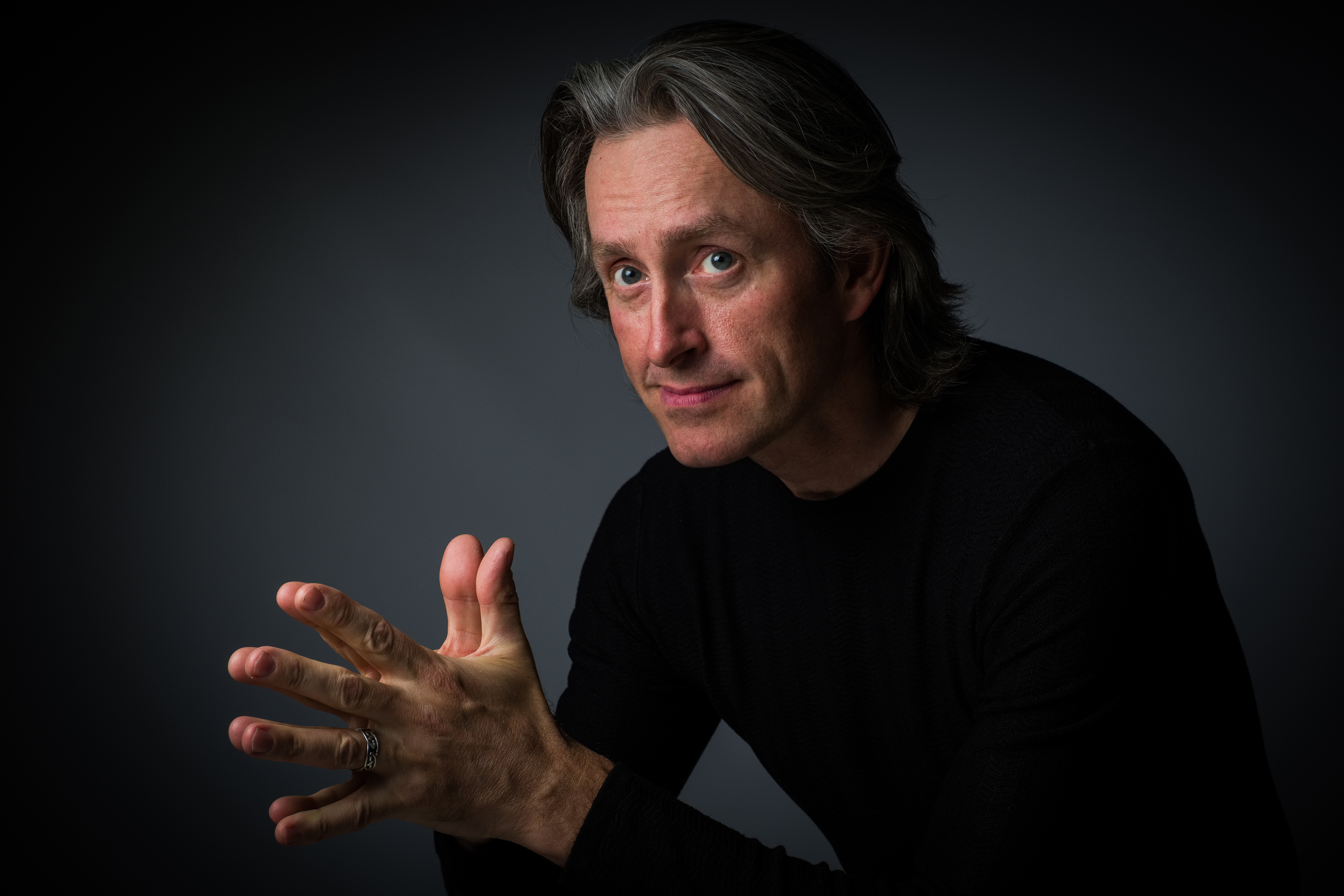

Background information
- Born: Thomas William Ellis Smith; 27 April 1967 (age 59); Edinburgh, Scotland
- Genres: Jazz, orchestral jazz, swing, classical, free improvisation
- Occupations: Musician, band leader, composer, educator
- Instruments: Tenor saxophone, soprano saxophone, flute, shakuhachi, piano
- Years active: 1981–present
- Labels: Hep, Head, ECM, Blue Note, Linn, Spartacus
- Website: tommysmith.scot

Thomas William Ellis Smith OBE (born 27 April 1967) is a Scottish jazz saxophonist, composer, and educator.

== Early life ==
Smith was born in Edinburgh, Scotland, to Scottish parents Brenda Ann Urquhart, and father, William John Ellis, whom he never met. Smith was brought up in the Wester Hailes area of the city, where he was encouraged by his stepfather, George Smith, an avid jazz fan and drummer in the Gene Krupa style, to take up the tenor saxophone at the age of twelve. When he was thirteen he attended a weekly jazz workshop under the direction of Gordon Cruikshank. He met pathologist and pianist Vincenzo Crucioli, who became a mentor. With drummer John Rae, his first group won Edinburgh International Jazz Festival Best Group award in 1981. At fourteen Smith won 'Best Soloist'. He attributes much of his early success to the tuition of Vincenzo Crucioli. Under additional clarinettist Jim O'Malley and pianist Jean Allison at Wester Hailes Education Centre, Smith was soon performing around Edinburgh and Scotland with his quartet with John Rae (musician). In 1983, at sixteen, he recorded his first album Giant Strides, with a trio featuring Rae and Alan Taylor. During the same year, he recorded his second album, Taking Off, and won a scholarship, assisted by a fund-raising program organized by his music teacher, Jean Allison, to attend Berklee College of Music in Boston, Massachusetts. At Berklee he formed the band Forward Motion with Norwegian bassist Terje Gewelt, Canadian drummer Ian Froman, and Hungarian pianist Laszlo Gardony. The band recorded two albums, Progressions and The Berklee Tapes (1985).

== Later career ==
With a recommendation from Chick Corea, Smith joined Berklee vice-president Gary Burton's group with bassist Steve Swallow, pianist Makoto Ozone, and drummer Adam Nussbaum, touring the world and recording the album Whiz Kids for ECM.

In 1989, when he was twenty-two, Smith signed with Blue Note, which released his album Step by Step. Burton produced the album with a band consisting of John Scofield (guitar), Eddie Gómez (bass), and Jack DeJohnette (drums). Three more albums followed for Blue Note: Peeping Tom (1990), Standards (1991), and Paris (1992). During this period Smith hosted a series of BBC-TV specials called Jazz Types in which he performed with guests such as Tommy Flanagan, Gary Burton, Chick Corea, Bobby Watson, Arild Andersen, Hue and Cry, and the BBC Scottish Symphony Orchestra. Smith recorded and toured with Hue and Cry, a duo of brothers Pat and Greg Kane with American vibist Joe Locke, percussionist Trilok Gurtu, and Arild Andersen. Smith also examined classical composition, leading to his first saxophone concerto, Unirsi in Matrimonio, and a suite for saxophone and strings, Un Ecossais a Paris.

In 1993, Smith joined the Scottish record label, Linn Records. His albums, Reminiscence (1993), Misty Morning and No Time (1994), Azure (1995, with Jon Christensen, Lars Danielsson and Kenny Wheeler), and Beasts of Scotland (1996) were released. Writing in Playboy magazine, Neil Tesser noted of Beasts of Scotland that "Smith's artful writing makes the ensemble sound like a petite Philharmonic." The Sound of Love followed. Recorded in New York City in September 1997 with Kenny Barron (piano), Peter Washington (bass), and Billy Drummond (drums), it focused on the Duke Ellington-Billy Strayhorn songbook. Gymnopedie: The Classical Side of Tommy Smith (1998) was recorded with his regular duo partner, classical pianist Murray McLachlan. The disc included music by Satie, Bartok, Grieg, and Chick Corea, and Smith's Sonatas No. 1 "Hall of Mirrors" and No. 2 "Dreaming With Open Eyes" based on Michael Tucker's book of the same title. Returning to jazz and to New York the following year, Smith then recorded his final album for Linn, Blue Smith, with John Scofield and his regular rhythm section of bassist James Genus and drummer Clarence Penn.

In June 2025, Smith was dismissed from his role as Head of Jazz at the Royal Conservatoire of Scotland, a position he had held since 2009, following a disciplinary investigation into a relationship he had with a student.

== Scottish National Jazz Orchestra ==
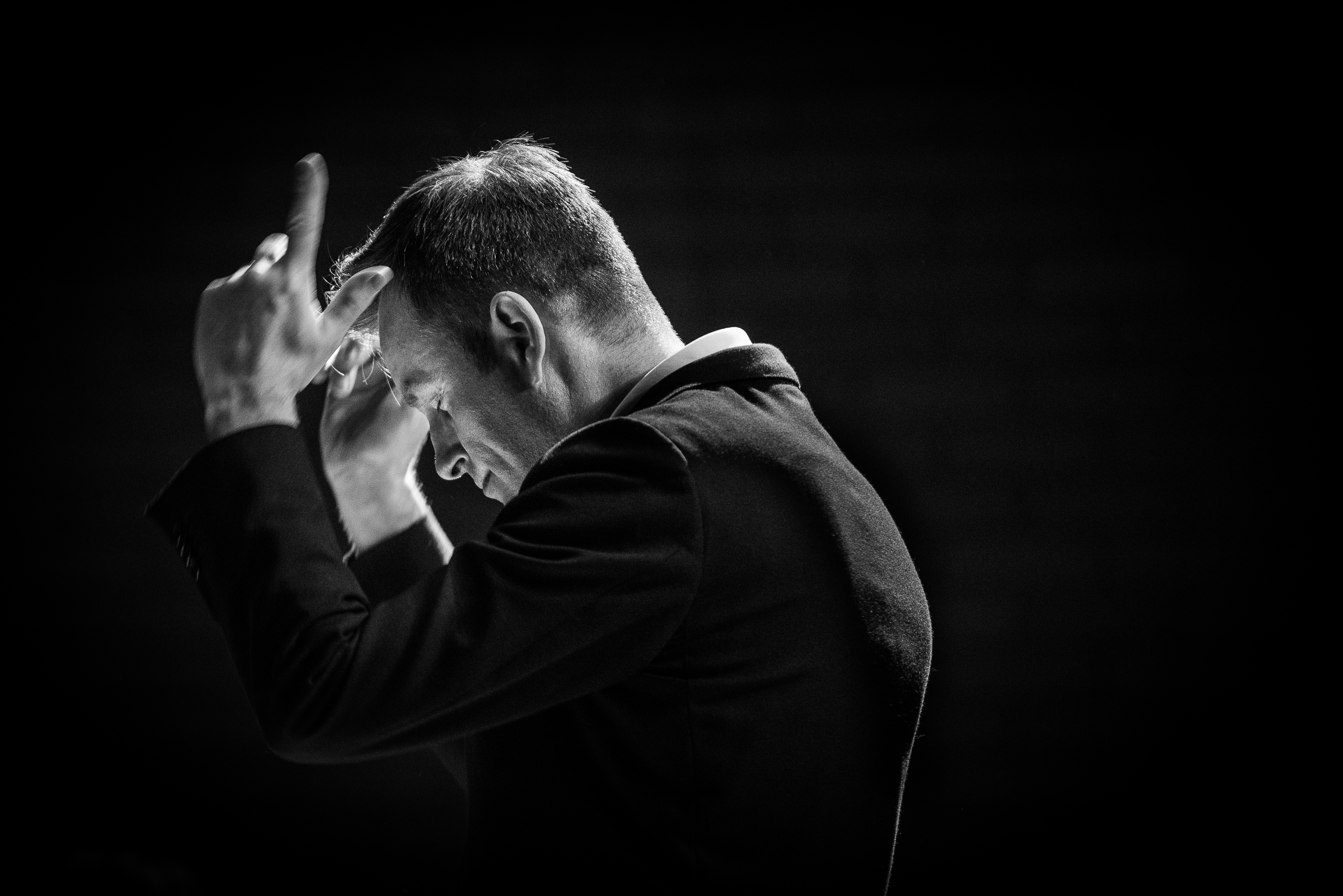
Tommy Smith conducting the Scottish National Jazz Orchestra featuring special Guest Courtney Pine in 2014

In 1995 Smith founded the Scottish National Jazz Orchestra, which has presented programs of repertory classics and more contemporary works, often specially commissioned.

The repertory programs have included Duke Ellington's extended suites, celebrations of Count Basie and Benny Goodman (with special guest Ken Peplowski) and the collaborations between Miles Davis and Gil Evans – Porgy & Bess, Sketches of Spain (both with Gerard Presencer as trumpet soloist) and Miles Ahead (with Ingrid Jensen). SNJO has presented the music of Charles Mingus, Oliver Nelson, Benny Carter, Stan Kenton, Thelonious Monk, Steely Dan, Astor Piazzolla, and Pat Metheny (with guitarists Jim Mullen, Phil Robson, Mike Walker and Kevin MacKenzie) and premiered special commissions by Keith Tippett, Florian Ross, and Geoffrey Keezer, as well as specially commissioned arrangements of John Coltrane, Chick Corea (with drummer Gary Novak), Wayne Shorter featuring Gary Burton, Electric Miles featuring John Scofield, Weather Report featuring Peter Erskine, and Kurt Elling.

In addition, SNJO has performed music by contemporary jazz musicians. These include Kenny Wheeler's Sweet Sister Suite; Joe Lovano's Celebrating Sinatra with arrangements by Manny Albam; the music of Maria Schneider conducted by the composer; and Smith's Planet Wave, a large-scale composition made possible by the Arts Foundation/Barclays Bank jazz composition fellowship prize which marries Smith's music to text by poet Edwin Morgan. The concerts with Lovano also featured the premiere of Smith's Torah, a work based on the first five books of the Bible in which a titanic struggle occurs between good and evil. Written over seventy days, the fifty-minute composition was created for Lovano and SNJO. During the same evening that Torah was being premiered in Scotland, Cleo Laine and John Dankworth premiered The Morning of the Imminent by Smith and Morgan at The Kennedy Center in Washington, DC. On Friday May 3 2024, the SNJO played with the Royal Scottish National Orchestra back in his native Edinburgh including a performance of his arrangement of George Gershwin's Rhapsody in Blue featuring Makoto Ozone on the piano.

== Classical music ==
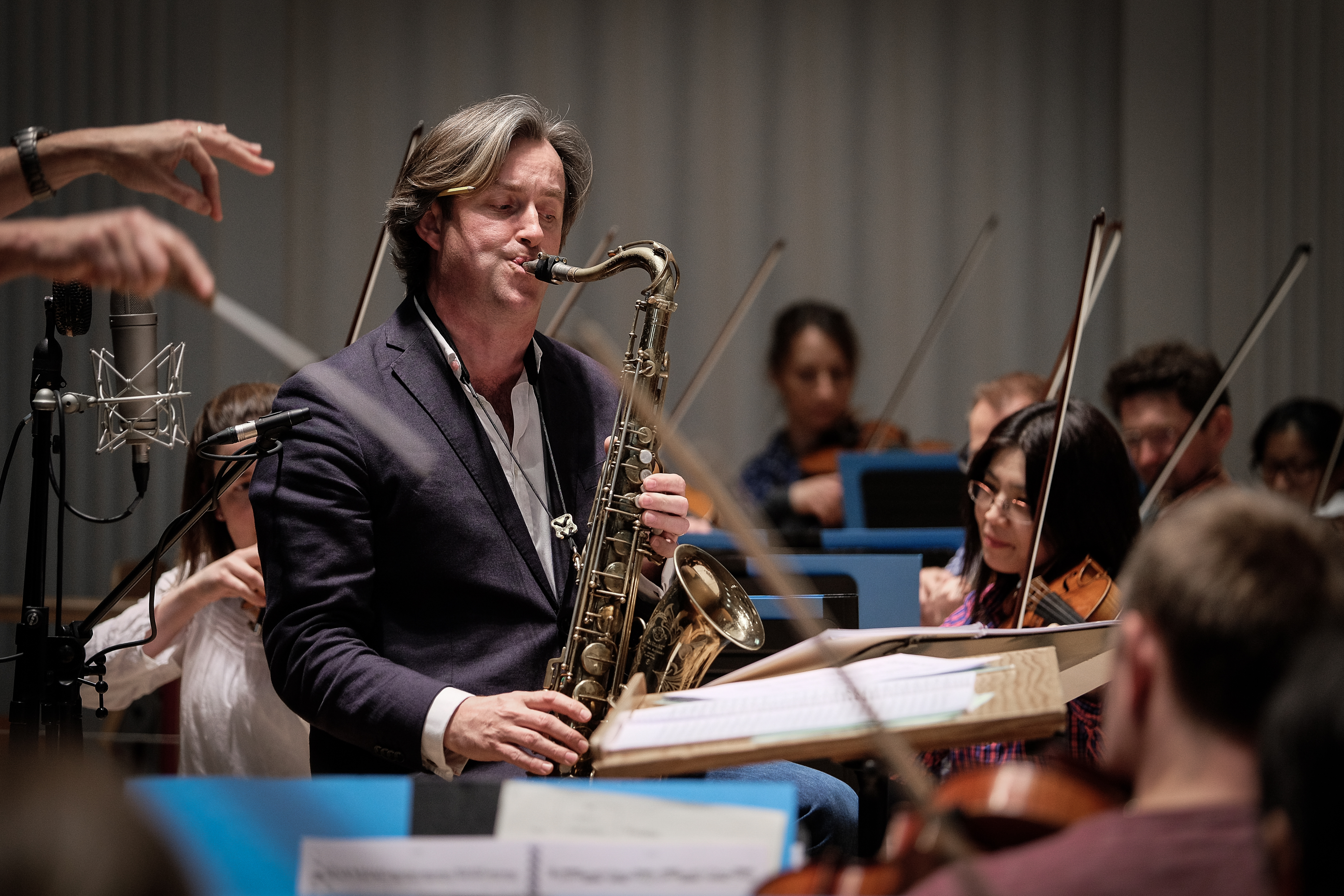
Smith recording his epic Modern Jacobite piece with The BBC Scottish Symphony Orchestra

In 1989 Smith performed An Rathad Ùr ("The New Road"), a concerto for saxophone by William Sweeney, with the BBC Scottish Symphony Orchestra for the television series Jazz Types, which Smith also presented. Prompted by Roger Pollen of the Scottish Ensemble, he spent six months studying orchestration for strings with a commission for saxophone and strings very much in mind. As a Blue Note musician at the time, Smith had access to the parent company EMI's classical catalogue. He researched orchestration texts by Samuel Adler, Rimsky-Korsakov, and Cecil Forsyth, and spent two productive years in Paris where he studied classical music. He wrote his first classical composition, Unirsi in Matrimonio, for saxophone and strings in 1990. This was followed by another work for strings and saxophone, Un Ecossais À Paris in 1991, and he collaborated with classical pianist (Murray McLachlan) for Sonata No.1 – Hall of Mirrors and Sonata No.2 Dreaming with Open Eyes, both for saxophone and piano.

The next seven years were spent preparing for a much bigger orchestral work, the saxophone concerto Hiroshima (1998). This was premiered with the Orchestra of St. John Smith's Square at Chelmsford Cathedral and included strings, brass, woodwinds, percussion, piano, and saxophone. Smith appeared as solo saxophonist for Sally Beamish's The Knotgrass Elegy, commissioned for the 2001 BBC Proms, and performed with the BBC Symphony Orchestra at the Royal Albert Hall in London. In 2002, Smith performed his earlier and much lengthier re-invention of Children's Songs for saxophone and orchestra with the Scottish Ensemble at St John's Kirk, Perth. Other classical music endeavours have included a suite entitled Edinburgh, written for the Edinburgh Youth Orchestra's 40th anniversary in 2003. The suite, with saxophone, bass, drums, and a one-hundred-person symphony orchestra, toured Scotland, Estonia, Russia, and Finland.

== Discography ==
=== As leader ===
- 1983 Giant Strides (GFM)
- 1983 Taking Off (Head)
- 1984 The Berklee Tapes Forward Motion (Hep)
- 1985 Progressions Forward Motion (Hep)
- 1988 Step by Step with (John Scofield), (Jack DeJohnette), (Eddie Gomez) (Mitchel Forman) (Blue Note)
- 1990 Peeping Tom (Blue Note)
- 1991 Standards (Blue Note)
- 1992 Paris (Blue Note)
- 1993 Reminiscence with Forward Motion (Linn)
- 1994 Misty Morning and No Time (Linn)
- 1995 Azure with (Kenny Wheeler), (Lars Danielsson), (Jon Christensen)(Linn)
- 1996 Beasts of Scotland (Linn)
- 1997 The Sound of Love with (Kenny Barron) (Linn)
- 1999 Blue Smith with (John Scofield)(Linn)
- 1999 Gymnopedié with (Murray McLachlan) (Linn)
- 2000 Spartacus with (Kenny Barron) (Spartacus)
- 2001 Into Silence (Spartacus)
- 2001 The Christmas Concert (Spartacus)
- 2002 Alone At Last (Spartacus)
- 2002 Bezique with Brian Kellock (Spartacus)
- 2003 Evolution with (John Scofield), (Joe Lovano), (John Taylor), (John Patitucci), (Bill Stewart) (Spartacus)
- 2004 Symbiosis with Brian Kellock (Spartacus)
- 2005 Forbidden Fruit (Spartacus)
- 2011 Karma (Spartacus)
- 2014 Whispering of the Stars with Brian Kellock (Spartacus)
- 2016 Modern Jacobite with BBCSSO (Spartacus)
- 2017 Embodying the Light (Spartacus)
- 2021 Solow (Spartacus)
- 2024 Luminescence (Spartacus)
- 2024 Love Unrequited with (John Taylor) (Spartacus)
- 2025 Eternal Light with Gwilym Simcock (Spartacus)
- 2026 Four (Spartacus)

With the Scottish National Jazz Orchestra

- 2002 Miles Ahead (Spartacus)
- 2009 Rhapsody in Blue Live (Spartacus)
- 2010 Torah (Spartacus)
- 2012 Celebration with (Arild Andersen)(ECM)
- 2013 In the Spirit of Duke (Spartacus)
- 2014 American Adventure with (Mike Stern)(Spartacus)
- 2015 Culloden Moor Suite (Spartacus)
- 2016 Beauty And The Beast with Bill Evans (Spartacus)
- 2017 Jeunehomme with Makoto Ozone (Spartacus)
- 2018 Sweet Sister Suite with Laura Jurd (Spartacus)
- 2019 Peter & the Wolf with Makoto Ozone (Spartacus)
- 2021 Where Rivers Meet (Spartacus)

With the Tommy Smith Youth Jazz Orchestra

- 2008 Exploration (Spartacus)
- 2011 Emergence (Spartacus)
- 2017 Effervescence (Spartacus)

With Arild Andersen and Paolo Vinaccia

- 2008 Live at Belleville (ECM)
- 2014 Mira (ECM)
- 2018 In-House Science (ECM)

=== As guest ===
- 1981 European Community Jazz Orchestra, Eurojazz
- 1986 Gary Burton, Whiz Kids (ECM)
- 1996 Hue and Cry, Jazz Not Jazz (Linn)
- 1997 Karen Matheson, The Dreaming Sea (Survival)
- 1999 Hue and Cry, Next Move (Linn)
- 2001 Clark Tracey, Stability (Linn)
- 2004 Joe Locke, Dear Life (Sirocco)
- 2005 Reynolds Jazz Orchestra, Cube (Shanti)
- 2006 Pino Iodice, High Tension
- 2007 Loic Dequidt, Nomade (Kopasetic)
- 2010 Michael McGoldrick, Aurora (Secret Music)
- 2013 Capercaillie, At the Heart of It (Secret Music)
- 2015 Kurt Elling, Passion World
- 2017 Giuliana Soscia & Pino Jodice Quartet Meets Tommy Smith, North Wind (Alman Music)
- 2026 Terje Gewelt, The Old Tree (Resonant Music)

== Awards and honors ==
Year	Category
2019	Scottish Jazz Award [Best Band/SNJO]
2019	OBE [Her Majesty The Queen's New Year honours list] 2019 New Year Honours
2017	British Jazz Award [Big Band]
2015	Parliamentary Jazz Award [Educator]
2013	Scottish Jazz Award [Best Live Performance/SNJO]
2013	Honorary Doctorate of Music University of Edinburgh
2012	British Jazz Award [Big Band]
2012	Scottish Jazz Award [Educator]
2012	Scottish Jazz Award [Album 'KARMA']
2011	Scottish Jazz Award [Educator]
2011	Scottish Jazz Award [Big Band]
2011	Parliamentary Jazz Award [Large Ensemble/SNJO]
2010	Professorship from the Royal Conservatoire of Scotland
2009	Scottish Jazz Award [Big Band]
2009	Scottish Jazz Award [Woodwind]
2008	Honorary Doctorate of Letters Caledonian University, Glasgow
2008	Heart of Jazz Award BBC Jazz Awards#2008
2002	The British Jazz Awards [Best Tenor Saxophonist]
2000	Scottish Arts Council [Creative Scotland Award]
2000	Honorary Fellow of the Royal Incorporation of Architects in Scotland
2000	Honorary Doctorate of the University Heriot-Watt University, Edinburgh
1996	Arts Foundation/Barclays Bank [Jazz Composition Fellowship Prize]
1996	BT British Jazz Award
1992	Wavendon All Music Awards [Services to Music]
1989	British Jazz Award
1986	BBC National Big Band Competition [Outstanding Musician Award]
1981	Edinburgh Jazz Festival [Best Band]
1981	Edinburgh Jazz Festival [Best Soloist]
