= London Elektricity =

English electronic musician

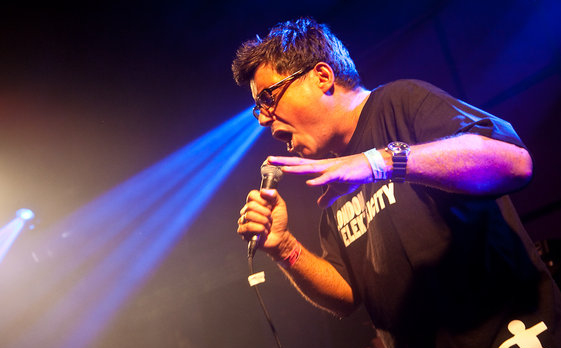
- London Elektricity performing in September 2009

Background information
- Born: Anthony Colman; 28 April 1961 (age 65)
- Origin: London, England
- Genres: Drum and bass, liquid funk, electronica, breakbeat, acid jazz
- Years active: 1996–present
- Labels: Hospital Records, Fast Soul Music
- Members: Tony Colman (production, keyboards)
- Past members: Chris Goss (production, keyboards, guitar); Liane Carroll (vocals, keyboards); Jungle Drummer (drums); Andy Waterworth (bass); Landslide (drum pads); Robert Owens (vocals); Diane Charlemagne (live vocals); Stamina MC (rapping); SP MC (rapping); MC Wrec (rapping)
- Website: londonelek.bandcamp.com/album/lunatics-legends

Anthony Colman (born 28 April 1961), better known by his stage name London Elektricity, is an English electronic musician who co-founded Hospital Records and Fast Soul Music.

== History ==
The first incarnation of London Elektricity was the duo Tony Colman and Chris Goss. Founders and backbone of Hospital Records, they also pursued parallel projects under the monikers Peter Nice Trio and Dwarf Electro, but it was their tune "Song in the Key of Knife" under the guise London Elektricity that first gained them widespread recognition. In 1999, they released their debut album Pull the Plug on Hospital Records. Although session musicians contributed a wide range of live instruments (double bass, electric guitar, brass section, flute, strings), and jazz singer Liane Carroll provided vocals on two tracks, the LP was essentially a studio work, under the control of producer/DJ duo Colman and Goss.

In 2002, Chris Goss departed to concentrate on managing Hospital Records, leaving Tony to be CEO of Hospital Records, and to take on the mantle of London Elektricity himself. The second album Billion Dollar Gravy was released in 2003. During the making of the album, the session musicians began to coalesce into a band, and Colman decided to take the band live. The line-up included Colman, Andy Waterworth, Landslide, MC Wrec, the Jungle Drummer, Liane Carroll and Robert Owens, amongst others. In 2004 they released a live DVD entitled London Elektricity: Live Gravy, which was recorded in October 2003 at the Jazz Café.

2005 saw the release of their third album, Power Ballads, using some members of the live band on some tracks. London Elektricity announced at Pressure (the University of Warwick's drum and bass event) on 2 December 2005 that they had no plans to play live in future. As of 2006 Tony Colman now produces and DJs drum and bass solo under the name of London Elektricity.

Colman presented the Hospital Records podcast from 1996 to 2019. It generally featured many releases from Hospital Records, and a wide spectrum of drum and bass from around the globe. In 2014 the podcast won 'Best Podcast' at the BT Digital Music Awards, at the time amassing over 30,000 downloads a show. The podcast regularly involved special guests who were signed to Hospital records such as Logistics. Colman also hosted the Forza Horizon series' in-game Hospital Records radio station, alongside Goss, in Forza Horizon 2, 3 and 4.

In 2007, London Elektricity won the BBC 1Xtra Xtra Bass award for best live act. London Elektricity's fourth album, Syncopated City, was released in September 2008. The month before this marked his Essential Mix on BBC Radio 1.

London Elektricity's fifth album, Yikes!, was released in April 2011, followed by Are We There Yet? in November 2015.

in 2019 Colman released Building Better Worlds, and in 2023 he stepped away from running Hospital Record entirely, and founded the Fast Soul Music label as a home for releasing his own music. 2024 and 2025 saw a flurry of releases on Fast Soul Music, culminating in the release of the album Lunatics and Legends in November 2025, featuring collaborations with Catching Cairo, Dunk, Liane Carroll, Genesis Elijah, Danny Byrd, Jolliffe, Gentry, Stanley Colman, Anile, Zara Kershaw, Gentleman's Dub Club, DJ Marky, Makoto, Doktor and Elsa Esmeralda.

Also in 2025 Colman released two tracks on Metalheadz – Life Is But A Dream and All On Top (ft Genesis Elijah)

== Influences ==
According to his MySpace page, Tony Colman's influences include a large array of artists and composers, such as Fela Kuti, Kraftwerk, Brian Eno, Led Zeppelin, Steve Reich, Gil Evans, Tonto and others. Elements from jazz, soul, Latin, dub, rock, and punk are present in many of London Elektricity's songs.

== Discography ==
=== Studio albums ===
- 1999 – Pull the Plug
- 2003 – Billion Dollar Gravy
- 2005 – Power Ballads
- 2008 – Syncopated City
- 2011 – Yikes!
- 2015 – Are We There Yet?
- 2019 – Building Better Worlds
- 2025 – Lunatics & Legends

=== DJ Mixes ===
- 2006 – Hospitalised (with High Contrast & Cyantific)
- 2010 – Hospitality Presents This Is Drum + Bass (with High Contrast)

=== Live albums ===
- 2004 – Live Gravy
- 2006 – Live at the Scala
- 2017 – Live in the Park
- 2017 – Live at Pohoda

=== Compilation albums ===
- 2002 – In the Waiting Room
- 2006 – Medical History
- 2007 – The Best of London Elektricity

=== Remix albums ===
- 2006 – Facelift The Remixes
- 2011 – Yikes! Remixes!!
- 2016 – Are We There Yet? The Med School Scans
- 2021 – Rebuilding Better Worlds
- 2023 – Billion Dollar Remixes

=== Singles and EPs ===
- 1996 – "Sister Stalking / "Brother Ignoramus"
- 1997 – "Ultrasound"
- 1998 – "Pull The Plug" / Dirty Dozen"
- 1998 – "Song in the Key of Knife" / "Theme From The Land Sanction"
- 1999 – "Rewind" / "Rewound"
- 1999 – "Rewind (Acoustic Edit)" / "Dub You Believe"
- 2000 – "Wishing Well" / "Elektric D-Funk"
- 2000 – "Round The Corner"
- 2001 – "My Dreams" (vs Robert Owens)
- 2002 – "Cum Dancing" / "Down Low"
- 2003 – "Billion Dollar Gravy" / "Harlesden"
- 2004 – "Live at the Jazz Cafe"
- 2005 – "The Strangest Secret in the World (45 Edit)" b/w "Pussy Galore"
- 2005 – "The Mustard Song"
- 2005 – "Hanging Rock"
- 2006 – "Remember the Future"
- 2008 – "All Hell Is Breaking Loose"
- 2008 – "Syncopated City"
- 2008 – "Attack Ships on Fire" / "South Eastern Dream"
- 2011 – "Elektricity Will Keep Me Warm" / "The Plan That Cannot Fail"
- 2011 – "Meteorites" (feat. Elsa Esmeralda)
- 2019 – "Final View From The Rooftops (feat. Cydnei B.)"
- 2021 – "Lonely Sirens (feat. Elsa Esmeralda)"
- 2024 – "Don't Stop (feat Doktor)"
- 2024 – "Always Golden (feat Catching Cairo)"
- 2024 – "Elektrify ft DJ Marky, Makoto & Vonne"
- 2025 – "Diamonds In The Rain ft Bcee & Ruth Royal"
- 2025 – "Unfrozen" ft Anile & Zara Kershaw"
- 2025 – "Life Is But A Dream"
- 2025 – "All On Top ft Genesis Elijah"
- 2025 – "Painkiller ft Gentleman's Dub Club"
- 2025 – "Lozenge Frenzy"
- 2025 – "(I Don't Want To) Fly Away ft Liane Carroll"
- 2025 – "Echoes In The Dance ft Danny Byrd"
- 2025 – "The Numbers Man Pt 1 ft Jolliffe, Gentry & Stanley Colman"
