= Tom Bancroft =

British jazz drummer and composer

Thomas Peter Bancroft (born 29 January 1967) is a British jazz drummer and composer.

== Early life and education ==
Bancroft was born in London on 29 January 1967. He began drumming aged seven and started off playing with his father and twin brother, Phil. The family moved to Scotland when Tom was nine and he had gigs in Edinburgh from his mid-teens. While studying medicine at Cambridge University, he composed music and continued playing gigs. For nine months during 1988–89, Bancroft studied composition and arranging at McGill University in Montreal, Canada.

== Later life and career ==
Back in Scotland in 1990, Bancroft wrote for his big band. Qualifying as a doctor in 1992, he then worked as a jazz musician and composer, in addition to doing some medical work, including in Russia. The big band toured the UK in 1996. He has toured extensively in various bands and has written for radio and television.

In 1998, along with New Zealander Suzy Melhuish, Bancroft co-founded Caber Music. The first release was Bancroft's Pieology, a selection of concert and broadcast performances.

Bancroft is co-leader of Trio AAB with Phil Bancroft and guitarist Kevin MacKenzie. Their first album was Cold Fusion. This was followed by Wherever I Lay My Home That's My Hat. Stranger Things Happen at C was their next album and included Brian Finnegan on flutes and whistles for some tracks. Critic John Fordham wrote that the trio "skids between Scottish folk music, the melancholy defiance of John Coltrane and the sprightly melodic laterality of Ornette Coleman".

Around 2012, an album by Bancroft's Trio Red band was released by Interrupto Music. The other musicians on First Hello to Last Goodbye were pianist Tom Cawley and bassist Per Zanussi. Fordham described it as "a shot-in-the-dark venture that turned into a world-class trio in a week." A second album, Lucid Dreamers, was released around 2016.

== Discography ==
=== As leader/co-leader ===
- Pieology (Caber, 1993–97)
- Cold Fusion (Caber, 1998?)
- Wherever I Lay My Home That's My Hat (Caber, 2000?)
- Stranger Things Happen at C (Caber, 2002?)
- First Hello to Last Goodbye (Interrupto, 2012?)
- Lucid Dreamers (Interrupto, 2016?)
