= Colin Steele (trumpeter) =

Scottish jazz trumpeter

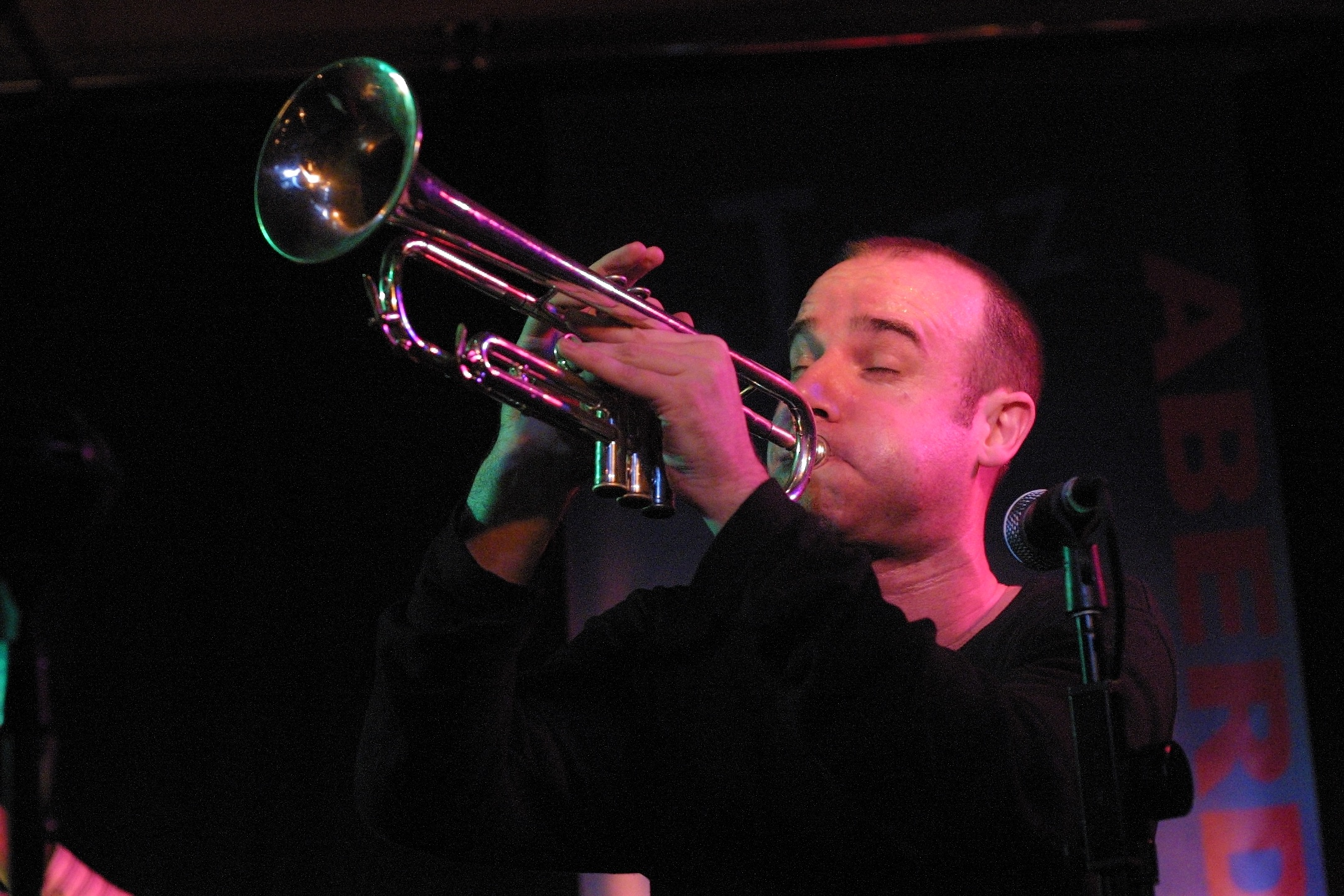
- Colin Steele performing at the Blue Lamp, Aberdeen Nov 2004

Background information
- Origin: Scotland
- Genres: Jazz
- Occupation: Trumpeter
- Website: www.colinsteele.com

Colin Steele is a jazz trumpeter from Scotland.

He played pop music with Hue and Cry during the 1980s, as part of their backing band the John Rae Collective with Brian Kellock, Tom and Phil Bancroft, Kevin Mackenzie, Kenny Ellis.

After two years in France he studied jazz at the Guildhall School of Music and Drama before returning to Scotland. He has been known for influences from Latin music and funk and has recorded several well-regarded albums.

He has been increasingly influenced by Scottish folk music, an influence carried into the additional instrumentation in his group Colin Steele's Stramash. as well as playing in Ceilidh Minogue's horn section and Bachué with Corrina Hewat (harps/vocals), David Milligan (piano, and Donald Hay (drums).

Colin Steele's Stramash reformed in 2025 to play Queen's Hall Edinburgh and Blue Lamp Aberdeen. Colin was accompanied by David Milligan, arrangements and piano, Seonaid Aitken and Chris Stout fiddles, Patsy Reid fiddle/viola, Su-a Lee cello, Rory Campbell whistle/pipes, Phil Bancroft saxes, Calum Gourlay bass, and Alyn Cosker drums.

Stramash plan to record a new album in 2025 with support from Creative Scotland.

== Discography ==
- 2000 Twilight Dreams - Colin Steele - Caber (caber024)
- 2003 The Journey Home - Colin Steele - Caber (caber029)
- 2005 Through the Waves - Colin Steele Quintet - ACT (ACT 9436–2)
- 2008 Stramash - Colin Steele - Gadgemo (GAD001)
- 2017 Even in the darkest places- Colin Steele - Gadgemo (GAD002)
- 2017 Diving for Pearls - Colin Steele - Marina records (MA82)
