= List of Indian playback singers =

This is a list of playback singers from India.

== Female playback singers ==
Name	Years active	Language
A. R. Reihana	1998–present	Tamil
Aarti Mukherji	1961–present	Bengali, Hindi
Akriti Kakar	2006–present	Hindi, Bengali, Marathi
Alisha Chinai	1988–present	Hindi, Telugu, Bengali, Assamese, Kannada
Alka Ajith	2011–present	Malayalam, Tamil
Alka Yagnik	1980–present	Bengali, Hindi, Punjabi, Malayalam, Tamil, Odia, Gujarati, Nepali, Assamese, Marathi, Telugu, Urdu, Bhojpuri, English
Amirbai Karnataki	1935–1961	Hindi, Urdu, Kannada
Amrutha Suresh	2007–present	Malayalam
Abhirami Suresh	2008–present	Malayalam
Ananya Bhat	2017–present	Kannada, Hindi, Malayalam, Tamil, Telugu
Andrea Jeremiah	2007–present	Tamil, Telugu, English
Anindita Paul	2000–present	Hindi, Assamese, Bengali
Anitha Shaiq	2007–present	Tamil, Malayalam, Odia, Kannada, Hindi, Arabic
Anjali Marathe	1994–present	Marathi, Hindi
Annupamaa	1992–present	Telugu, Tamil, Malayalam, Kannada, Hindi, French, English
Anupama Deshpande	1984–2002	Hindi, Marathi, Telugu, English, Tamil, Odia
Anuradha Bhat	2006–present	Kannada, Hindi, Tamil, Telugu, Tulu
Anuradha Paudwal	1973–present	Hindi, Bengali, Marathi, Odia, Tamil, Nepali, Kannada
Anuradha Sriram	1993–present	Hindi, Telugu, Tamil, Kannada, Malayalam
Antara Mitra	2010–present	Bengali, Hindi, Kannada, Malayalam , Tamil, Telegu, Gujarati, Punjabi, Haryanvi, Assamese, English
Anushka Manchanda	2006–present	Hindi, Telugu, Tamil
Anweshaa	2006–present	Bengali, Hindi, Tamil, Telugu, Kannada, Malayalam, Marathi
Aparna Balamurali	2016–present	Malayalam
Arati Ankalikar-Tikekar	1975–present	Konkani, Marathi, Hindi
Arundhati Holme Chowdhury	1980–present	Bengali, Hindi
Asha Bhosle	1943–2026	Bengali, Telugu, Hindi, Urdu, Marathi, Assamese, Gujarati, Punjabi, Tamil, English, Russian, Czech, Nepali, Malay, Malayalam, Konkani, Kannada, Odia and other languages
Aseema Panda	2013–present	Odia
Asees Kaur	2015–present	Hindi, Bengali
B. R. Chaya	1983–present	Kannada, Tamil
Banashree Sengupta	1964–2017	Bengali, Hindi, Assamese, Bhojpuri, Odia
Bangalore Latha	1962-2000	Kannada, Telugu, Malayalam, Tamil, Tulu
Bela Shende	1999–present	Marathi, Hindi, Tamil and Urdu
Bhagwanti Navani	1950–1980	Sindhi, Hindi
Bhaswati Chakraborty	2005–present	Hindustani Classical Vocalist, Bengali, Dadra, Chaiti, Kajri, Thumri
Bhavatharini	1995–2024	Tamil, Telugu, Hindi, Kannada
Bhitali Das	1992–2021	Assamese
Bombay Jayashri	1982–present	Tamil, Telugu, Hindi, Kannada
Chaitra Ambadipudi	2005–present	Telugu, Tamil, Hindi, Kannada, Malayalam
Chaitra H. G.	2002–present	Kannada, Telugu, Tamil, Malayalam, Bengali, Konkani, English
Charulatha Mani	2002–present	Tamil, Kannada
Chhaya Ganguly	1978–present	Hindustani, Urdu
Chinmayi Sripada	2002–present	Tamil, Telugu, Hindi, Malayalam, Kannada, Marathi, Gujarati, Konkani
Chitra Singh	1965–present	Bengali, Hindustani, Urdu
Dominique Cerejo	1997–present	Hindi, Tamil
Dhvani Bhanushali	2015–present	Hindi, Tamil
Falguni Pathak	1988–present	Hindustani, Gujarati, Hindi, Assamese, Bengali
Gauhar Jan	1902–1910	Hindi, Bengali, Gujarati, Marathi, Tamil, Arabic, Persian, Poshtu, French, English
Gayatri Asokan	1998–present	Malayalam
Gayatri Iyer (Gayatri Ganjawala)	1996–present	Hindi, Telugu
Geeta Dutt	1946–1971	Hindi, Bengali
Geetha Madhuri	2006–present	Telugu, Tamil
Harshdeep Kaur	2001–present	Hindi, Punjabi, Bengali, English
Hard Kaur	1995–present	Hindi
Harini	1995–present	Malayalam, Telugu, Tamil, Hindi
Hema Sardesai	1989–present	Hindi
Hemlata	1968–present	Bengali, Bhojpuri, Punjabi, Haryanvi, Rajasthani, Marwari, Brij Bhasha, Gujarati, Marathi, Sindhi, Odia, Assamese, Tamil, Telugu, Malayalam, Kannada, Konkani, Dogri, Multani, Saraiki, Garhwali, Bundeli, Nepali, Arabic, Persian, Urdu, Sanskrit, Prakrit, English, French, Mauritius, African, Italian, Zulu, Dutch, Hindi
Himani Kapoor	2005–present	Hindi, Punjabi
Ila Arun	1993–present	Rajasthani, Hindi, Tamil, Telugu
Iman Chakraborty	2016–present	Bengali
Indu Nagaraj	2010–present	Kannada, Telugu
Jagjit Kaur	1953–1981	Hindi, Urdu
Jayati Chakraborty	2002–present	Bengali
Jasmine Sandlas	2010–present	Hindi, Punjabi
Jaspinder Narula	1994–present	Hindi, Punjabi
Jency Anthony	1966–present	Tamil, Telugu, Malayalam, Kannada
Jikki	1964–2000	Telugu, Tamil, Malayalam, Kannada
Jonita Gandhi	2014–present	Hindi, Bengali, Tamil, Telugu, Marathi
Jyotica Tangri	2017–present	Hindi, Punjabi
Jyotirmayee Nayak	2019–present	Odia, Hindi
Jyotsna Radhakrishnan	1998–present	Malayalam
June Banerjee	2008–present	Bengali, Hindi
Kumari Kanchan Dinkerao Mail	1970–2004	Hindi
Kalpana Raghavendar	2003–present	Tamil, Telugu, Kannada
Sukhjinder virk	1998 – present	Punjabi
Sukhwinder Singh	1991–present	Hindi, Bengali, Telugu, Tamil, Malayalam, Marathi, Punjabi
Sudhir Yaduvanshi	2023–present	Hindi
Sundar Narayana Rao	2013–present	Hindi, Telugu, Tamil
Suresh Wadkar	1978–present	Hindi, Marathi, Odia, Bengali, Urdu, Tamil, Telugu, Kannada, Assamese, Nepali
Kalpana Patowary	1993–prese	Bhojpuri, Assamese, Hindi, Bengali, Marathi
Kanika Kapoor	2012–present	Hindi, Bengali, Punjabi
Kanan Devi	1931–1956	Bengali, Hindi
Kavita Krishnamurthy	1973–present	Hindi, Punjabi, Telugu, Tamil, Malayalam, Marathi, Kannada, Odia, Nepali, Gujarati, Bengali, English, Assamese, Bhojpuri
Kharesma Ravichandran	2014–present	Tamil
K. B. Sundarambal	1934–1980	Tamil
K. Jamuna Rani	1946–2026	Tamil, Telugu, Malayalam, Kannada, Sinhalese
K. S. Chithra (referred to as Chitra)	1980–present	Malayalam, Telugu, Tamil, Kannada, Odia, Hindi, Bengali, English, Russian, German, Arabic, Tulu, Sinhalese, Assamese, Punjabi, Nepali
Lata Mangeshkar	1942–2022	Hindi, Bengali, Urdu, Marathi, Assamese, Odia, Kannada, Malayalam, Telugu, Tamil, Gujarati, Punjabi, Konkani, Urdu, Sanskrit, Rajasthani, Bhojpuri, English, Nepali
L. R. Eswari	1954–present	Telugu, Tamil, Malayalam, Kannada, Hindi
Lothika	2022–present	Hindi
Madhushree	2001–present	Hindi, Tamil, Telugu, Kannada, Bengali
Mahalakshmi Iyer	1997–present	Hindi, Bengali, Telugu, Tamil, Kannada, English, Assamese, French, Marathi and other languages
Mahathi	2003–present	Telugu, Tamil, Malayalam, Kannada
Maitrayee Patar	2015–present	Assamese, Hindi
Malavika	2001–present	Telugu
Malgudi Subha	1988–present	Telugu, Tamil, Kannada, Malayalam, Hindi
Malvina	2003–present	Tamil
Mannat Noor	2015–present	Punjabi
Mamta Sharma	2010–present	Hindi, Tamil, Telugu, Bengali, Kannada, Haryanvi
Mangli	2017–present	Telugu , Kannada
Manjari	2004–present	Malayalam, Tamil
Megha	2007–present	Tamil, Telugu, Kannada, Malayalam
Minmini	1988–present	Malayalam, Tamil, Telugu, Hindi, Kannada, Odiya, Badaga
Monali Thakur	2006–present	Bengali, Hindi, Tamil
Mridula Warrier	2007–present	Malayalam, Tamil, Kannada
Mubarak Begum	1955–1981	Hindi, Urdu
Najim Arshad	2007–present	Malayalam, Tamil, Telugu, Hindi
Nanditha	1998–present	Kannada, Odia, Tamil, Hindi
Neeti Mohan	2003–present	Hindi, Bengali, Maratahi, Telugu, English, Tamil, Kannada
Neha Kakkar	2006–present	Hindi, Bengali, Marathi, Telugu, Kannada, Punjabi
Neha Rajpal (Nehha Rajpal) née 'Chandna'	1995–present	Hindi, Marathi, Gujrati, Sindhi, Chattisgadi, Telugu, Kannada, Bengali
Nihira Joshi	2004–present	Hindi, Marathi
Nikhita Gandhi	2013–present	Bengali, Hindi, Tamil, Telugu, Arabic, Kannada, English
Nilanjana Sarkar	2010–2015	Bengali
Nimrat Khaira	2015–present	Punjabi
Nirmala Mishra	1960-2022	Bengali, Odia, Assamese
Nithyasree Mahadevan	1997–present	Tamil, Telugu, Kannada, Hindi, Sinhalese, Punjabi, Bengali, Urdu, Marathi
Noor Jahan	1930–2000	Urdu,Punjabi,Hindi,Sindhi,Pashto
P. Bhanumathi	1939–2005	Telugu, Tamil, Hindi
P. Leela	1948–2005	Malayalam, Tamil, Telugu, Kannada, Gujarathi, Marati, Hindi, Odia, Sinhalese, Sanskrit, Bengali
P. Madhuri	1965–present	Malayalam, Telugu, Tamil
P. Susheela	1953–present	Telugu, Tamil, Malayalam, Kannada, Hindi, Bengali, Odia, Marathi, Sinhalese, Tulu, Sanskrit
Palak Muchhal	1997–present	Hindi, Bengali, Sanskrit, Gujarati, Odia, Assamese, Rajasthani, Bhojpuri, Punjabi, Marathi, Kannada, Telugu, Tamil, Sindhi and Malayalam
Pop Shalini (Shalini Singh)	1995–present	Tamil, Telugu, Kannada, Hindi
Prashanthini	2007–present	Tamil, Telugu
Priya Himesh	2007–present	Tamil, Telugu, Kannada
Pritam Priyadarshni	2018–present	Bhojpuri, Hindi, Kannada, Telugu, Marathi, Malayalam, Sanskrit, Urdu, English
Queen Hazarika	1996–present	Assamese, Hindi, Bengali, Marathi
Rajkumari Dubey	1949–1977	Hindi, Gujarati, Punjabi
Rakshita Suresh	2015–present	Tamil, Telugu, Kannada, Hindi, Malayalam,
Ramakrishna V.	1960–1980	Telugu
Ranina Reddy	2008–present	Telugu, Tamil
Ranjini Jose	2005–present	Tamil, Telugu, Malayalam, Kannada, Hindi
Rao Balasaraswathi Devi	1939–1980	Telugu, Tamil
Reena Bhardwaj	2003–present	Tamil, Telugu, Hindi
Rekha Bhardwaj	1997–present	Hindi, Bengali, Punjabi
Richa Sharma	2000–present	Hindi
Rimi Tomy	2000–present	Malayalam, Telugu
Roopa Revathi	2008–present	Malayalam, Tamil
Ruma Guha Thakurta	1944–2019	Bengali, Hindi
Suraiya	1929–2004	Hindi
S. Janaki	1957–2026	Kannada, Malayalam, Tamil, Telugu, Hindi, Urdu, Odia, Tulu, Saurashtra, English, Japanese, Baduga, German, Sinhalese, Bengali, Sanskrit, Punjabi, Konkani, Gujarati and other languages
S. P. Sailaja	1977–2002	Telugu, Tamil, Kannada, Malayalam
Sadhana Sargam	1982–present	Hindi, Bengali, Marathi, Telugu, Tamil, Kannada, Malayalam, Gujrathi, Sanskrit, Punjabi, Bhojpuri, Ahirani, Assamasse, Kumaowni, Sindhi, Marwadi, Dogri, Bodo, Kashmiri, Manipuri, Sandhali, English, Odia, Tulu, Konkani, Gharwali, Maithili, Punjabi, Urdu, Nepali
Sagarika Mukherjee	1979–present	English, Hindi, Assamese, Bengali
Salma Agha	1980–present	Urdu, Hindi
Samantha Edwards	1990–present	English, Hindi, Tamil, Punjabi
Sanchita Bhattacharya	2006–present	Bengali, Hindi
Sandhya Mukhopadhyay	1948–2022	Bengali, Hindi, Urdu
Sanjeevani (Sanjeevani Bhelande)	1998–present	Hindi, Marathi, Nepali, Gujarati, Telugu, Bengali, English
Santha P. Nair	1951–1967	Malayalam
Saindhavi	2001–present	Tamil, Telugu, Kannada
Sapna Mukherjee	1985–present	Hindi
Shakthisree Gopalan	2008–present	Tamil, Malayalam, Telugu, Hindi, Kannada, English
Shalmali Kholgade	2012–present	Hindi, Bengali, Marathi, Tamil, Telugu
Shamshad Begum	1941–1976	Hindi, Urdu, Punjabi
Sharda Rajan Iyengar	1965–1986	Hindi, Telugu, Marathi, Gujarati
Shashaa Tirupati	2010–present	Hindi, Tamil, Malayalam, Telugu, Marathi, Bengali, Punjabi, Urdu, English, Arabic, Armenian, Kannada, Konkani, Assamese
Shazneen Arethna	2007–present	Hindi
Shefali Alvares	2009–present	Hindi, Telugu, English
Shilpa Rao	2003–present	Hindi, Bengali, Telugu, Kannada, Tamil, Punjabi, Urdu, Malayalam
Sharda Sinha	1980–2024	Hindi, Bhojpuri, Maithili
Shibani Kashyap	2003–present	English, Hindi
Shreya Ghoshal	1998–present	Hindi, Urdu, Assamese, Bengali, Bhojpuri, Bodo, Kannada, Malayalam, Marathi, Nepali, Punjabi, Sindhi, Tamil, Telugu, Tulu, Gujarati, Rajasthani, French, Angika, Odia, Sanskrit, English, Arabic, Konkani
Shruti Pathak	2004–present	Hindi, Urdu, Bengali
Shubha Mudgal	1996–present	Hindi, Tamil
Shweta Mohan	1995–present	Hindi, Malayalam, Telugu, Tamil, Kannada
Shweta Pandit	1999–present	Hindi, Bengali, Kannada
Shweta Shetty	1990–present	Hindi, Urdu
Shirley Setia	2013–present	Hindi
Sivaangi Krishnakumar	2019–present	Tamil, Malayalam, Telugu
Sitara Devi	1930–1950	Hindi, Bengali
Sithara	2007–present	Malayalam, Tamil, Telugu, Kannada
Smita	2000–present	Telugu, Tamil, Hindi
Sona Mohapatra	2005–present	Hindi, Odia, Marathi
Sonu Kakkar	2002–present	Hindi, Punjabi, Kannada, Tamil, Telugu
Somlata Acharyya Chowdhury	2009–present	Bengali
Sowmya Raoh	1993–present	Kannada, Tamil, Telugu, Hindi
Sravana Bhargavi	2012–present	Telugu
Srilekha Parthasarathy	2002–present	Telugu, Tamil, Malayalam
Srinisha Jayaseelan	2014–present	Tamil, Telugu
Sudha Malhotra	1954–1982	Hindi
Sujatha	1977–present	Malayalam, Hindi, Telugu, Tamil, Kannada
Sulakshana Pandit	1967–1998	Hindi
Suman Kalyanpur	1954–1981	Hindi, Marathi, Assamese, Gujarati, Kannada, Bhojpuri, Rajasthani, Bengali, Odia, Punjabi, Urdu
Sunitha Sarathy	2002–present	Tamil, Malayalam, Telugu, Hindi, Kannada, English, Mandarin
Sunitha Upadrashta	1995–present	Telugu, Tamil, Kannada
Surmukhi Raman	1997–present	Tamil, Telugu, Kannada, Malayalam
Sushma Shrestha	1971–present	Hindi, Nepali, Marathi
Sunanda Sharma	2016–present	Hindustani, Hindi, Punjabi
Sunidhi Chauhan	1996–present	Hindi, Telugu, Tamil, Kannada, Urdu, Punjabi, Marathi, Bengali, Odia
Suvi Suresh	2005–present	Tamil, Hindi, Kannada
Suzanne D'Mello	1994–present	Tamil, Telugu, Hindi
Swarnalatha	1987–2010	Tamil, Telugu, Malayalam, Kannada, Hindi, Urdu, Punjabi, Badaga, Bengali, Odia, Nepali, Marathi, Sinhalese and Others
Sanju Rathod	2007–Present	Marathi
Tanvi Shah	2004–present	Tamil, Telugu, Hindi
Tarali Sarma	1995–present	Assamese
Tulsi Kumar	2006–present	Hindi, Bengali
Usha	1999–present	Telugu
Usha Khanna	1960–present	Hindi, Urdu, Odia
Usha Mangeshkar	1954–present	Marathi, Hindi, Assamese, Gujarati, Bengali, Nepali, Odia, Urdu
Usha Uthup	1966–present	Tamil, Telugu, Hindi, Assamese, Marathi, Bengali, Gujarati, Punjabi, English, Russian, Czech, Nepali, Malay, Malayalam, Kannada, Odia
Uthara Unnikrishnan	2012–present	Tamil, Telugu
Vaikom Vijayalakshmi	2013–present	Malayalam, Tamil, Kannada
Vaishali Samant	2008–present	Marathi, Hindi
Vaishali Mhade	2000–present	Marathi, Hindi
Vandana Srinivasan	2012–present	Tamil
Vani Jayaram	1971–2023	Telugu. Hindustani, Tamil, Marathi, Gujarati, Bhojpuri, Hariyanvi, Odia, Bengali, Malayalam, Kannada
Vasundhara Das	1994–present	Tamil, Telugu, Hindi, Malayalam, Kannada
Varun Khandke	2007–present	Hindi, Telugu, Urdu, Marathi
Yohani De Silva	2022–present	English, Hindi, Sinhala, Tamil, Telugu, Malayalam
Zahrah S Khan	2020–present	Hindi, English
Zohrabai Ambalewali	1930–1950	Hindi, Punjabi, Marathi

== Male playback singers ==
Name	Years active	Languages
32Stitches	2016–present	English
Alphons Joseph	2003–present	Malayalam, Tamil, Telugu, Kannada, Hindi
Ash King	2009–present	Bengali, Gujarati, Hindi, Telugu
Aaman Trikha	2012–present	Hindi, English, Punjabi, Kannada, Tamil, Malayalam, Telugu, Bhojpuri, Rajasthani, Gujarati, Marathi, Bengali, Odia
Adnan Sami	1991–present	Hindi, Telugu, Odia
Aditya Narayan	1995–present	Nepali, Hindi, Bengali, Marathi
Aditya G Nair	2022–present	Marathi, Hindi, Malayalam
Amit Kumar	1965–present	Bengali, Hindi, Odia, Marathi
Amit Trivedi	2001–present	Hindi
Anindya Chatterjee	1997–present	Bengali
Anirban Bhattacharya	2019–present	Bengali
Anirudh Ravichander	2013–present	Tamil, Hindi, Telugu
Anuj Gurwara	2009–present	Telugu, Hindi
Anupam Roy	2007–present	Bengali, Hindi
Anurag Kulkarni	2015–present	Telugu, Kannda
Anwar	1979–present	Hindi, Urdu
Abhijeet Bhattacharya	1982–present	Bengali, Hindi, Marathi, Gujarati, Odia, Bhojpuri, Nepali & others
Abhijeet Sawant	2005–present	Hindi, Marathi
A. R. Rahman	1992–present	Tamil, Hindi, English, Telugu, Malayalam, Kannada, Urdu, Punjabi
Arijit Singh	2011–2026	Bengali, Hindi, Telugu, Tamil, Assamese, Kannada, Marathi, Gujarati, Urdu, Punjabi
Ami Mishra	2015–present	Hindi
Amit Mishra	2011–present	Hindi, Telugu, Marathi, Urdu
Ankit Tiwari	2010–present	Hindi, Bengali, Telugu, Odia
Armaan Malik	2007–present	Hindi, English, Bengali, Telugu, Tamil, Kannada, Marathi, Malayalam, Gujarati, Punjabi, Urdu
Amaal Mallik	2014–Present	Hindi, Tamil, Telugu
Ayushmann Khurrana	2012–present	Hindi, Punjabi
Babul Supriyo	1994–present	Bengali, Hindi
Babbu Maan	1998–present	Punjabi, Hindi
Badshah	2006–present	Hindi, Punjabi, English, Bengali
Bappi Lahiri	1973 – 2022	Bengali, Hindi, Odia
Benny Dayal	2002 – present	Bengali, Hindi, Malayalam, Telugu, Tamil, Kannada, Gujarati, Marathi
Bhimsen Joshi	1941–2011	Hindi, Kannada, Marathi Bhajans
Bhupen Hazarika	1942–2011	Assamese, Bengali, Hindi, Odia, English
Bhupinder Singh	1964–2022	Hindi, Urdu, Punjabi, Bengali, Odia, Nepali
Blaaze	2002–present	English, Tamil, Hindi, Telugu, Kannada, Malayalam
Biju Narayanan	1993–present	Malayalam, Tamil, Kannada, Telugu
Bohemia	2001–present	Punjabi, Hindi
Chandan Shetty	2012–present	Telugu, Kannada
Chetan Sosca	2001–present	Kannada, Telugu, Tamil
Clinton Cerejo	1999–present	Hindi, Tamil, Telugu
Damodar Raao	2007–present	Hindi, Bhojpuri
Darshan Raval	2014–present	Hindi, Telugu, Gujrati, Bengali
Devan Ekambaram	1999–present	Tamil, Telugu, Kannada
Devi Sri Prasad	1999–present	Telugu, Tamil, Hindi
Daler Mehndi	1995–present	Hindi, Punjabi, Telugu, Tamil
Dhananjay Bhattacharya	1940–1992	Bengali, Hindi
Dhanush	2011–present	Tamil
Diwakar	2014–present	Tamil
Diljit Dosanjh	2004–present	Punjabi, Hindi
Dwijen Mukhopadhyay	1944–2018	Bengali, Hindi
G. M. Durrani	1935–1977	Hindi, Punjabi, Urdu and Pashto
G. Venugopal	1986–present	Malayalam, Tamil
Gajendra Verma	2008–present	English, Hindi
Ghantasala	1942–1974	Telugu, Tamil, Kannada, Malayalam, Hindi
Gurdas Maan	1983–present	Punjabi, Hindi
Gurshabad	2015–present	Punjabi
Guru Randhawa	2013–present	Punjabi, Hindi(soon)
Happy Raikoti	2014–present	Punjabi
Haricharan	2005–present	Tamil, Malayalam, Telugu
Hariharan	1977–present	Hindi, Maithili, Bengali, Tamil, Kannada, Telugu, Malayalam, Marathi
Hemanta Mukherjee	1937–1989	Bengali, Hindi, Marathi, Urdu, Odia
Himesh Reshammiya	2005–present	Gujarati, Tamil, Hindi, Urdu, Punjabi, Sindhi (soon), Arabic (soon), English (soon), French (soon)
Hriday Gattani	2014–present	Hindi, Telugu, Marathi, English
Humane Sagar	2012–2025	Odia
Jagjit Singh	1965–2011	Hindi, Urdu, Punjabi, Nepali
Jassie Gift	2003–present	Malayalam, Tamil, Kannada, Telugu
Javed Ali	2000–present	Hindi, Bengali, Telugu, Marathi, Odia, Kannada, Malayalam, Tamil, Urdu
Jayanta Hazarika	1962–1977	Assamese, Bengali
Jeet Gannguli	2013–present	Bengali, Hindi
Joi Barua	2002–present	Assamese, Hindi, Tamil, Telugu
Jubin Nautiyal	2014–present	Telugu, Bengali, Odia, Tamil, English, Gujarati, Kannada, Sanskrit, Punjabi
KK	1996–2022	Hindi, Telugu, Tamil, Kannada, Malayalam, Bengali, English
Kailash Kher	2003–present	Hindi, Bengali, Urdu, Punjabi, Kannada, Tamil, Telugu, Rajasthani
Kanish Sharma	2014–present	Hindi, Punjabi, Dogri
Kamal Haasan	1983–present	Tamil, Hindi, Malayalam, Telugu, English
Karthik	1999–present	Tamil, Telugu, Malayalam, Kannada, Marathi, Hindi, Bengali
Khesari Lal Yadav	2008–present	Bhojpuri, Hindi
Kishore Kumar	1946–1987	Bengali, Hindi, Urdu, Odia, Marathi, Assamese and other languages
Kozhikode Abdul Kader	1951–1973	Malayalam
Krishna Beura	2004–present	Hindi, Odia
Krishna Iyer	2009–present	Tamil, Telugu, Kannada, Malayalam
K. J. Yesudas	1960–present	Tamil, Malayalam, Hindi, Telugu, Kannada, Bengali, Marathi, Punjabi, Gujarati, Tulu, English, French, German, Russian, Arabic, Malay, Sanskrit, Latin
K. L. Saigal	1932–1947	Hindi, Urdu, Bengali
Kunal Ganjawala	2002–present	Hindi, Bengali, Kannada, Marathi, Telugu, Tamil
Leon D'Souza	2011–present	Hindi, Tamil, Kannada, English
Lucky Ali	1975–present	Hindi, Telugu, Kannada, Tamil, Urdu
Kumar Sanu	1988–present	Bengali, Hindi, Marathi, Angika, Assamese, Punjabi, Odia, Telugu, Malayalam, Kannada, Tamil, Urdu, Pali, Bhojpuri, Gujarati, English
M. G. Sreekumar	1984–present	Malayalam, Tamil, Hindi, Telugu
M. M. Keeravani	1990–present	Hindi, Telugu
Madhu Balakrishnan	1999–present	Malayalam, Tamil, Kannada, Telugu
Mahati Swara Sagar	2018–present	Telugu
Mahendra Kapoor	1956–2008	Hindi, Punjabi, Odia, Urdu, Marathi, Nepali Bengali
Malaysia Vasudevan	1960–2011	Tamil, Telugu
Manabendra Mukhopadhyay	1953–1992	Bengali
Manikka Vinayagam	2001–present	Tamil, Telugu
Manna Dey	1942–2013	Bengali, Hindi, Malayalam, Odia, Urdu, Marathi, Kannada, Nepali
Mano	1987–present	Telugu, Tamil, Malayalam, Bengali, Hindi, Kannada
Master Saleem	1990–present	Hindi, Bengali, Punjabi, Telugu, Kannada, Urdu
Meet Bros	2005–present	Hindi, Punjabi
Mika Singh	1998–present	Punjabi, Hindi, Bengali, Telugu
Mohammed Rafi	1944–1980	Hindi, Bengali, Urdu, Punjabi, Gujrati, Marathi, Odia, Telugu, Sindhi, Assamese, Kannada, Tamil
Mohammed Aziz	1985–2018	Hindi, Urdu, Bengali, Punjabi, Telugu, Kannada, Odia
Mohammed Irfan	2010–present	Hindi, Tamil, Odia, Telugu, Bengali, and Marathi
Mohan Rathore	2009–present	Hindi, Bhojpuri
Mukesh	1940–1976	Hindi, Urdu, Gujarati, Punjabi, Bengali, Odia, Assamese
Sreerama Chandra	2005–present	Telugu, Hindi, Bengali, Tamil, Marathi, Kannada
Mohit Chauhan	2002–present	Hindi, Bengali, English, Pahari, Nepali, Tamil, Punjabi, Telugu, Marathi, Kannada, Gujarati
Nadeem Saifi	1973–2005, 2009	Hindi
Naga Sudharsanarao Chinchili	2024–present	Telugu, Bengali, panjabi, Hindi, English, Spanish
Naresh Iyer	2005–present	Hindi, Tamil, Telugu, Malayalam, Kannada
Najim Arshad	2007–present	Malayalam, Tamil, Telugu, Hindi
Nakash Aziz	2010–present	Hindi, Bengali, Telugu, Kannada, Gujarati, Tamil, Marathi
Nitin Dubey	2001–present	Hindi, Chhattisgarhi
Nitin Mukesh	1970–2004	Hindi, Urdu, Bengali
Navin Prabhakar	1995–present	Hindi, Marathi
Neeraj Shridhar	1994–present	Hindi, Bengali
Noel Sean	2006–present	Telugu
N. T. Rama Rao Jr	2005–present	Telugu, Kannada
P. B. Sreenivas	1950–2013	Telugu, Kannada, Tamil, Malayalam, Hindi, English-language
P. Jayachandran	1964–2025	Malayalam, Tamil, Kannada, Telugu, Hindi
Pankaj Mullick	1927–1978	Hindi, Urdu, Bengali
Pankaj Udhas	1980–2024	Hindi, Urdu, Sindhi, Nepali
Papon	1988–present	Assamese, Hindi, Bengali, Tamil, Marathi, Urdu, Mishing, Bodo, Tiwa, Punjabi,Odia
Parichay (singer)	2009–present	Hindi, Punjabi, English
Parthiv Gohil	1993–present	Hindi, Gujarati, English
Pawan Singh	1997–present	Bhojpuri, Hindi
Pawandeep Rajan	2015–present	Hindi, Marathi, Bengali, Punjabi, Kumaoni, Assamese
Pradip Somasundaran	1993–present	Malayalam, Tamil, Hindi, Kannada, Telugu
Premjeet Singh Dhillon	2018–present	Punjabi
Pritam	2001 – present	Bengali, Hindi
Puneeth Rajkumar	1981–1989; 2002 – 2021	Kannada, Tulu
Rahul Sipligunj	2009–present	Telugu, Hindi, Kannada
Rahul Vaidya	2005–present	Hindi, Marathi, Nepali, Telugu, Tamil
Rajesh Krishnan	1991–present	Kannada, Telugu, Tamil, Hindi and in about 15 languages
Ravindra Sathe	1972– present	Marathi, Hindi
Dr. Rajkumar	1965–2006	Kannada
Ram Miriyala	2019–present	Telugu
L. V. Revanth	2008–present	Telugu
Remo Fernandes	1975–present	Konkani, Hindi, English, Kannada, Telugu
P V N S Rohit	2010–present	Telugu
Roop Kumar Rathod	1992–present	Hindi, Tamil, Telugu, Kannada, Bengali, Marathi
Rupam Islam	2007–present	Bengali, Hindi
R. D. Burman	1965–1994	Bengali, Hindi, Assamese
S. D. Burman	1932–1975	Bengali, Assamese, Hindi
Silambarasan	2002–present	Tamil, Telugu
S. P. Balasubrahmanyam	1966–2020	Telugu, Tamil, Kannada, Malayalam, Hindi, Marathi, Bengali, Odia, Punjabi, Tulu, Gondi
S. P. Charan	1998–present	Tamil, Telugu, Kannada, Hindi
Saandip	2000–present	Telugu, Hindi, Kannada, Tamil
Sachin Warrier	2010–present	Malayalam, Telugu, Tamil
Sam Vishal	2019–present	Tamil, Telugu, Kannada, Malayalam
Sandeep Khurana	2000–present	English, Hindi
Shabab Sabri	1997–present	Hindi, Urdu
Shaan	1989–present	Hindi, English, Assamese, Bengali, Telugu, Urdu, Gujarati, Dhivehi, Kannada, Odia, Tamil, Marathi, Malayalam, Nepali, Konkani, Punjabi, Bhojpuri
Shabbir Kumar	1981–present	Hindi, Urdu, Marathi, Bengali, Odia, Gujarati, Bhojpuri, Punjabi, Assamese, Rajasthani
Shailendra Singh	1975–1997	Hindi, Urdu
Shankar Mahadevan	1998–present	Hindi, Sanskrit, Tamil, Telugu, Malayalam, Kannada, Bengali, Marathi
Shyamal Mitra	1949–1987	Bengali, Hindi, Assamese, Odia
Sid Sriram	2012–present	Telugu, Tamil, Hindi, Marathi
Sidhu Moose Wala	2016 – 2022	Punjabi
S. Thaman	2008–present	Telugu, Tamil, Kannada, Hindi, Malayalam
Sonu Nigam	1993–present	Hindi, English, Bengali, Maithili, Kannada, Nepali, Punjabi, Telugu, Urdu, Odia, Tamil, Marathi, Malayalam, Gujarati, Bhojpuri
Sudesh Bhosle	1988–present	Hindi, Marathi, Bengali, Nepali, Odia, Kumaoni
Suraj Jagan	2007–present	Hindi, Telugu, Bengali
Soham Chakraborty	2002–present	Hindi, Bengali
Sriram Parthasarathy	2001–present	Tamil, Telugu
Sukhjinder virk	1998 – present	Punjabi
Sukhwinder Singh	1991–present	Hindi, Bengali, Telugu, Tamil, Malayalam, Marathi, Punjabi
Sundar Narayana Rao	2013–present	Hindi, Telugu, Tamil
Suresh Wadkar	1978–present	Hindi, Marathi, Odia, Bengali, Urdu, Tamil, Telugu, Kannada, Assamese, Nepali
Sweekar Agasthi	2014–present	Telugu
Tanishk Bagchi	2008–present	Hindi, Bengali
Talat Mahmood	1945–1997	Hindi, Urdu, Bengali, Marathi
Tochi Raina	2008–present	Hindi
Tony Kakkar	2012–present	Hindi
Thomson Andrews	2012–present	Hindi, Tamil, Telugu, Bengali, Tulu, Malayalam
T. M. Soundararajan	1946–2013	Tamil, Telugu, Kannada, Malayalam, Hindi
Udit Narayan	1980–present	Nepali, Hindi, Bengali, Telugu, Tamil, Maithili, Bhojpuri, Punjabi, Gujarati, Odia, Urdu, Tulu, Kannada, Malayalam
Unni Menon	1981–present	Malayalam, Tamil, Telugu, Kannada
Unnikrishnan	1995–present	Tamil, Malayalam, Telugu, Kannada
Vijay Yesudas	2000–present	Malayalam, Tamil, Telugu, Kannada, Hindi
Vishal Dadlani	2005–present	Hindi, English, Bengali
Joseph Vijay	1994–present	Tamil
Vedala Hemachandra	2004–present	Telugu
Vijai Bulganin	2016–present	Telugu
Vijay Prakash	2004–present	Hindi, Kannada, Telugu, Tamil, Marathi
Vineeth Sreenivasan	2002–present	Malayalam, Tamil, Kannada
Vinod Rathod	1986 – present	Hindi, Bengali, Marathi, Gujarati, Punjabi, Nepali
Vishal Dadlani	1999–present	Hindi, Telugu, Marathi
Vishal Mishra	2015 – present	Hindi, Marathi, Tamil, Telugu
Yasser Desai	2009–present	Hindi
Yo Yo Honey Singh	2009–present	Hindi, Punjabi, English
Zubeen Garg	1992–2025	Assamese, Bengali, Hindi, Sanskrit, English, Tamil, Telugu, Kannada, Malayalam, Odia, Nepali, Marathi, Urdu, Adi, Bishnupriya Manipuri, Bhojpuri, Deori, Karbi, Kachari, Khasi, Kokborok, Mising, Nishi, Sadri, Sindhi, Tiwa, Goalpariya (dialect), Barpetia (dialect), Sambalpuri (dialect)
Goutam Giri	2011–present	Odia

== See also ==
- Playback Singer
- List of Indian film music directors
- Lists of Indian people
- Lists of musicians
- Hindi cinema content lists
