= Gul Makai =

Biographical film based on Malala Yousafzai

- Directed by: H.E. Amjad khan
- Written by: Bhaswati Chakrabarty
- Screenplay by: Bhaswati Chakrabarty
- Produced by: Sanjay Singhla; Preeti Vijay Jaju
- Starring: Reem Shaikh; Atul Kulkarni; Divya Dutta; Om Puri; Arif Zakaria
- Cinematography: Madhu Rao; Javed Ethesham
- Edited by: Praveen Angre
- Music by: Amar Mohile
- Production company: Tekno Films
- Distributed by: Pen Studios
- Release date: 31 January 2020
- Running time: 130 minutes
- Country: India
- Languages: Hindi; Urdu

Gul Makai is a 2020 Indian biographical drama film directed by H.E. Amjad Khan, written by Bhaswati Chakrabarty, and produced by Techno Films. The film is based on the life of Malala Yousafzai, a Pakistani activist for female education and the youngest ever Nobel Prize laureate.

Reem Shaikh portrays Malala Yousafzai in the film, which also features Om Puri in his final acting role. The film was released on 31 January 2020.

== Plot ==
The film portrays the life of Malala Yousafzai, focusing on her experiences in the Swat Valley of northwestern Pakistan and her advocacy for education rights, particularly for girls and women.

In 2009, the Taliban took control of the Swat Valley and imposed strict restrictions, including banning girls from attending school. During this period, Yousafzai began writing under the pseudonym "Gul Makai" for the BBC Urdu website, where she documented the challenges faced by girls in accessing education under Taliban rule.

Yousafzai's advocacy for education drew international attention and recognition. However, her activism also made her a political target. In 2012, she survived an assassination attempt by a Taliban gunman, an event that further amplified her message on the global stage.

== Cast ==
- Reem Shaikh as Malala Yousafzai
- Atul Kulkarni as Ziauddin Yousafzai
- Divya Dutta as Toor Pekai Yousafzai
- Om Puri as General Ashfaq Parvez Kayani
- Arif Zakaria as Sufi Muhammad
- Mukesh Rishi as Maulana Fazlullah
- Abhimanyu Singh as Hakimullah Mehsud
- Pankaj Tripathi as Baitullah Mehsud
- Sharib Hashmi as Ataullah Khan
- Kamlesh Gill as Malala's grandmother
- Chandrashekhar Dutta as Muslim Khan
- Ajay Chourey as Musa Khankhel
- Sayyed Irshad Ali Khan as Captain Najam Riaz Raja
- Ganesh Yadav as General Sanaullah Khan

== Production ==
H.E. Amjad Khan decided to make a film on Yousafzai's life and advocacy in 2012 following her assassination attempt. After the film was announced, Bhaswati Chakrabarty spent four years researching and writing the script.

Several hundred actresses auditioned for the role of Malala; 16-year-old Bangladeshi student, Fatima Sheikh, was initially cast. However, safety concerns arose due to backlash from religious extremists and Sheikh had to withdraw. The role was then given to child actress Reem Shaikh.

Veteran Bollywood actors Om Puri, Divya Dutta, Mukesh Rishi and Arif Zakaria were cast in supporting roles. Khan stated that physical resemblance to the characters' real-life counterparts was a key casting consideration.

Gul Makai began production in late 2016, filming on location in Bhuj (Gujarat) and Mumbai. Filming in Kashmir, however, was delayed due to ongoing conflict in the region. Filming resumed and concluded in January 2018.

The film was edited by National Award-winning editor, Praveen Angre, and included extensive VFX work to recreate the Swat Valley landscape and combat scenes.

== Soundtrack ==
Gul Makai

Soundtrack album by H.E. Amjad Khan
- Released: 23 January 2020
- Genre: Filmi Soundtrack
- Length: 20:04
- Language: Hindi
- Label: Tekno Music
- Producers: Sanjay Singla; Preeti Vijay Jaju
External audio
- Gul Makai on iTunes

The film's score was composed by Amar Mohile. The title song was written by Bhaswati Chakrabarty, and the remaining songs were written and composed by H.E. Amjad Khan.

| No. | Title | Singer(s) | Length |
|---|---|---|---|
| 1. | "Maula Mere" | Kailash Kher | 7:22 |
| 2. | "Gudda Guddi" | Azmat Hussain | 5:23 |
| 3. | "Haq Maula" | H.E. Amjad Khan, Piyush Mishra | 7:19 |
| Total length: | | | 20:04 |

== Reception ==
Udita Jhunjhunwala of Firstpost gave the film 1 out of 5, writing, "Gul Makai is well-intentioned but as a film, it flails about, overusing background music, abruptly ending scenes, not convincingly recreating an environment and shortchanging its subject. The script feels like a compilation of information culled from news clippings, Wikipedia, and books on Malala. Best to go straight to the source material and bypass this ennui."

Devesh Verma of Filmfare gave the film 2 out of 5, writing, "There is a clip from a speech by the real Malala at the end credits which offers more impact about education of girls worldwide than this two hour film because it showed a person's burning desire to bring about a change."
