= Feint (DJ) =

British drum and bass DJ and electronic music producer

Background information
- Born: Andrew Isaac Hu; 6 July 1992 (age 34); United Kingdom
- Origin: Manchester, England, United Kingdom
- Genre: Drum and bass
- Instruments: Guitar; Ableton Live; FL Studio; Logic Pro
- Years active: 2011–present
- Labels: Cloudhead; Liquicity; Kannibalen; Monstercat; NoCopyrightSounds; Ophelia; Seeking Blue; Subsphere
- Website: www.feint.media

Andrew Isaac Hu (born 6 July 1992) bka Feint is an English DJ and electronic music producer known for producing and releasing drum and bass records.

== Early life and career ==
Hu was born in the United Kingdom and was raised in Blackburn. As a child he always appreciated music regardless of any genre. Hu's first exposure to electronic music was listening to trance. When he was a teenager he started producing music after regularly listening to drum and bass music from record labels such as Hospital Records and Liquicity. Hu regularly listened to and regularly produced drum and bass because "It's technical, fast... [and] diverse" and allowed him as much creativity and expression as possible due to the genre being "defined only by a tempo range and certain drum rhythms". In 2010, Feint began self-releasing his music until he got picked up by record labels such as Monstercat and Liquicity.

Hu also includes sounds from his guitar into his tracks such as "Lonesong".

Feint used to use FL Studio, and now uses Ableton Live and Logic Pro to produce his records.

== Musical influences ==
Hu's key musical influences usually come from film soundtracks and video game soundtracks such as from Final Fantasy's soundtracks, but also takes inspiration from other electronic music producers. Notable film/video game composers he takes inspiration from are Hans Zimmer, Nobuo Uematsu, Ryuichi Sakamoto and Ólafur Arnalds For drum and bass acts, he cites Pendulum, Netsky, Fred V & Grafix, Matrix & Futurebound, and Logistics as some of his biggest inspirations. For bands, he cites M83, Bon Iver, and The 1975.

== Personal life ==
Hu's favorite video game is Chrono Trigger. Hu graduated with a Computer science degree at university.

== Discography ==
=== Extended plays (EPs) ===
Title	Tracklist	Details
Always Here	1. Always Here; 2. Forget Me Not (featuring CoMa); 3. Wasted (featuring Eric Hayes); 4. Straylight	Released: 13 October 2014; Label: Subsphere Records; Format: Digital download
Fall Away	1. Fall Away; 2. Watch Me; 3. Shatter; 4. Sincere	Released: 16 November 2015; Label: Cloudhead Records; Format: Digital download
Defiant	1. Defiant (featuring Laura Brehm); 2. Take It In - Instrumental	Released: 15 October 2018; Label: Liquicity Records; Format: Digital download
Lost & Found	1. Lost & Found (with R7cky); (featuring Skyelle): 1. 寻 (with R7cky); (featuring Morlin Liu)	Released: 21 February 2022; Label: Monstercat; Format: Digital download

=== Singles ===
Year	Title	Album	Label
2011	Atlas	Monstercat 001 - Launch Week	Monstercat
2012	Time Bomb (with Boyinaband) (featuring Veela)	Non-album single	Monstercat
2013	Lonesong	Non-album single	Monstercat
2014	When You Return (with Dabin) (featuring Daniela Andrade)	Ghost Hack	Kannibalen Records
2015	Pastels	Then & Now	Seeking Blue Records
2015	We Won't Be Alone (featuring Laura Brehm)	Non-album single	Monstercat
2015	Everything's Wrong (with Fox Stevenson)	Free Stuff	Self-released
2016	Words (featuring Laura Brehm)	Non-album single	Monstercat
2017	Worth The Lie (with Koven and Muzz)	Monstercat Uncaged Vol. 3	Monstercat
2017	Outbreak (featuring Mylk)	Rocket League x Monstercat Vol. 1	Monstercat
2018	Shockwave	Non-album single	NoCopyrightSounds
2019	Drifters (featuring Elizaveta)	Non-album single	Monstercat
2022	Space Boy (with Rameses B and Veela)	Non-album single	Monstercat
2023	Treading Water (with Hylia)	Ophelia Presents: Advent - Drum & Bass	Ophelia Records
2024	Farcall	Non-album single	Self-released

=== Remixes ===
Year	Original Artist	Title
2017	San Holo (featuring James Vincent Morrow)	The Future
2018	Cartoon & Jéja (with Kóstja)	Whatever I Do
