= Kinphonic =

British record label

- Founded: March 2015
- Founder: Tommie Keeston
- Genre: Various
- Country of origin: United Kingdom
- Official website: kinphonic.com

Kinphonic is a UK based record label, founded in 2015 by Tommie Keeston. It also specializes in bookings, publishing, record distribution, management, merchandise and graphic design. The label's mission is to become the forefront of electronic music culture.

== Sub-labels ==
The following labels are owned or licensed by Kinphonic.

- KINFree
- FIRSTOFF

== Discography ==
=== Kinphonic ===
Year	Title	Artist(s)	Genre
2015	Love Me	Kredo	Electronica, downtempo
2015	All This Time	Fox Stevenson	Drum & bass
2015	Taking Over (ft. Miyoki)	Rob Gasser, Miyoki	Drum & bass
2015	Ready To Beat	The Brig	Electro house
2015	Trap Lord Dance	STEREOLiEZ	Dubstep
2015	Death Mode (ft. GRAVITY)	Tisoki, GRAVITY	Glitch hop
2015	Gully Sully	Jarvis, Re:Flex	Dubstep
2015	Blood Rave	xKore	Dubstep
2015	Round The World	The Brig	Dubstep
2015	Puppet	The Brig	Dubstep
2015	Sensei	Soberts	Dubstep
2015	Re Animator	Creation	Dubstep
2015	Green Card	The Brig	Dubstep
2015	Enemy No. 1	Ivory	Dubstep
2015	Outta Cage	Evolve, Subsonic, SampliFire	Dubstep
2015	String Attack	Flakzz, Aryaxz	Dubstep
2015	Massacre	Murda	Dubstep
2015	The Don (ft. MAGMAG)	Lord Swan3x, MagMag	Dubstep
2016	Imagination	Michael White	Electro house
2016	Black Ice	Basstrick	Dubstep
2016	Shimmy	Prismatic	Dubstep
2016	Dead (ft. Gravity)	xKore	Dubstep
2016	Bad Guys (ft. Mikey Ceaser)	Ray Volpe, Mikey Ceaser	Dubstep
2016	Ruffest Sound Around	xKore	Dubstep
2016	No Rules	La Musique d'Ordinateur, Against the Waves, Gioser	Electro house
2016	Funky Rave	Michael White	Electro house
2016	Charge	Rob Gasser	Electro house
2016	Falling	Gioser, Roy Monsta	Electro house
2016	Losing Touch	Tonal Law	Electro house
2016	Cucu	Gioser	Dubstep
2016	Svmple Fvnk	Rob Gasser	Dubstep
2016	Dark Side	Wiguez	Dubstep
2016	Set Me Fre	Kredo	Deep house
2016	Memories	Madeforme	Electronica, downtempo
2016	Come Lay With Me	Kredo	Electronica, downtempo
2016	Mayhem	La Musique d'Ordinateur	Breaks
2016	Tap Out (ft. Dubskie)	Bone, La Musique d'Ordinateur, Dubskie	Dubstep
2016	Go HAM (ft. Problem Child)	Problem Child, La Musique d'Ordinateur, Gioser	Dubstep
2017	Intro	Eluun	Electronica, downtempo
2017	New Life	Eluun	Electronica, downtempo
2017	31 Days	Eluun	Electronica, downtempo
2017	This Is A Story	Eluun	Electronica, downtempo
2017	Introspection Vertigineuse	Eluun	Electronica, downtempo
2017	Little Sweetness	Eluun	Electronica, downtempo
2017	Funky Uncle	Fox Stevenson	Future house
2017	Bad Boy	Sonny Banks	House
2017	Solidifed	STEREOLiEZ	Electro house
2017	Action	Gioser	Electro house
2017	Low	La Musique d'Ordinateur	Electro house
2017	Back In It	La Musique d'Ordinateur, Erotic Café	Electro house
2017	Alluma	High Beggars	Dubstep
2017	Hypemachine	Rob Gasser	Dubstep
2017	Things	Madeforme	Electronica, downtempo
2017	D Deep	Razat	Dubstep
2017	Nine Roses	Wiguez	Drum & bass
2017	Distorted Minds	Wydron	Electronica, downtempo
2017	Baddest	Gabriele Giudici	Electro house
2018	Get Ready	xKore, Erotic Cafe	Drum & bass
2018	Mine	KenKode	Electronica, downtempo
2018	Moan	KenKode	Electronica, downtempo
2018	Night Slave	KenKode	Electronica, downtempo
2018	Spaghettification	KenKode	Electronica, downtempo
2018	The Out Low	Erotic Cafe	Electro house
2018	Stay Back	Eluun	Electro house
2018	Lock Bass	MPV, Gioser	Electro house
2018	Into U	Gioser	Electro house
2018	Bang	Gioser	Electro house
2018	RuffNeck	WB x MB	Dubstep
2018	Hits Blunt	BOARCROK	Dubstep
2018	Praimfaya	Kris Cayden	Dubstep
2018	Destroy Everything	Venon, Nvikto	Dubstep
2018	One For The Trouble	Soberts	Dubstep
2018	Land Of Hollows	RYVI	Dubstep
2018	Jazzin	Flakzz, Aryaxz	Dubstep
2018	Green Monstah	Braindeath, Ric Waves	Dubstep
2018	Despair	Flakzz	Dubstep
2018	Digital Life	Eluun	Electro house
2018	I Need You	Eluun	Future bass
2018	Good Deal	KG Man, Erotic Cafe	Future bass
2018	Too Slow For Dance	The Brig	Electro house
2018	Tide	Kredo	Techno
2018	Chiasma	Kredo	Groove, jackin' house
2018	Doghouse	La Musique d'Ordinateur	Future house
2018	Space Stage	Eluun	Dubstep
2018	Murph	Kredo	Soul, disco
2018	Tantrum	Kredo	Soul, disco
2018	Predator	WB x MB	Dubstep
2018	Carry On	Rhodz	Electro house
2018	Mood	Jake Rello	Future house

=== KINFree ===
Year	Title	Artist(s)	Genre
2016	Moon Shoes	Konstellation	Electronica, downtempo
2016	Resuffer	Wydron	Dubstep
2016	Riot	La Musique d'Ordinateur, Basstrick	Breaks
2016	Lucid Dreams	Holly, TODIEFOR	Dubstep
2016	Close To You	Mix Wistful, WTN3	Electronica, downtempo
2016	Sun	Holly, Razat	Dubstep
2016	Colours	Chime	Dubstep
2016	Never Again	madeforme	Electronica, downtempo
2016	Getting There	Holly, TODIEFOR	Glitch Hop
2016	Fly	Wiguez	Trap
2016	2 Late Now	Holly, Ponicz	Dubstep
2016	Turn Up The Bass	Tonal Law	Breaks
2016	Dark Side VIP	Wiguez	Dubstep
2017	Don't Miss Me	Farisha, Baehem	Electronica, downtempo
2017	Daydreamer	MYLK	Electronica, downtempo
2017	Blind Eyes	Syrebral	Dubstep
2017	SMILEY	StereoLiez, High Beggars	Hip-Hop, R&B
2017	Left Behind	Frost	Trap
2017	Bad Mind	Emme, KG Man, Erotic Cafe	Trap
2017	Without You	Subsurface, Reese Redwood	Dance
2017	Skill Of A God	Wydron, Backchat	Dubstep
2017	Dream Away	Konstellation, dolltr!ck	Dubstep
2017	Duality	ZWZ	Dubstep
2017	Hold Up (Your Light)	Voodoo Nation	Dance

=== FIRSTOFF ===
Year	Title	Artist(s)	Genre
2017	Figures	Gioser	Electro house
2017	In The Club	Boiria	Electro house
2017	Jet Lag	Blansh, Usica	Electro house
2017	Deranged	Holly, Rettchit	Future house
2018	The Hunter	Spojaz	Hard Dance
2018	Way Up	MNYKR	Future house
2018	Brain	Fulbset	Electro house
2018	Chemicals	Psychospeak, Chemistry	Dubstep
2018	Runnin	Kaiba	Trap, future bass
2018	Konichiwa	Kaiba	Dubstep
2018	Monster	Kaiba	Trap, future bass
2018	Polkadots	Kaiba	Trap, future bass
2018	Similar Things	Ben Lepper, Heavy Pulse	Drum & bass
2018	Dokyo	Vanger	Trap, future bass
2018	OMG	Venz, Sickbeatz	Future house
2018	Your Eyes	Lekler	Electro house

=== Albums ===
Year	Album's Name	Artist(s)	Catalog
2015	We Are Kin, Vol. 1	Various	KIN001
2015	Heavyweight, Vol.1	Various	KIN004
2016	Kinfree, Vol. 1	Various	KIN005
2017	We Are Kin Vol. 2	Various	KIN008
2018	Heavyweight Vol.2	Various	KIN016

== See also ==
- List of record labels
- List of independent UK record labels
