= Shelflife vol 2 =

Shelflife Vol. 2

Compilation album by Calibre
- Released: May 18, 2009
- Recorded: 1999 / 2009
- Genre: Drum and bass, liquid funk, downtempo
- Label: Signature / Soul:R

Calibre chronology
Overflow (2008)	Shelflife Vol. 2 (2009)	Shine a light (2010)

Shelflife Vol 2 is the second retrospective album & the fifth solo studio album by Calibre. Released on May 18, 2009 (although it was scheduled to be released on 11 May 2009) by his own imprint Signature Records. The Vinyl collection brings together eight of the most sought Calibre classics showcasing why his sound remains his own after ten years of producing and releasing drum and bass.

Another retrospective album including long lasting dubplates such as 'life' and 'why time'. Just like previous albums this won't be featuring much artists apart from vocals which will be featuring lariman and DRS.

== Tracklising ==
Disc 1:

No.	Title	Length
1.	"Out Of The Box"	5:41
2.	"Nightlights"	3:22
3.	"All The Days"	5:38
4.	"Harbinger"	5:30
5.	"Nowheretobefound" (Feat. Lariman)	4:50
6.	"Fine As Dust"	5:39
7.	"Mindprint"	5:12
8.	"The Cage" (feat. Basil & ST Files)	4:01
9.	"Soft Tear"	4:12

Disc 2:

No.	Title	Length
1.	"Lazy Rock"	5:49
2.	"Life"	6:28
3.	"Half Full"	5:36
4.	"What To Do In These Times"	5:24
5.	"Overeaction Dub" (Feat. Lariman)	5:45
6.	"Harry"	5:34
7.	"Zombie Life"	5:12
8.	"Find A Way"	4:29
9.	"The Blues"	5:47

Vinyl version (4x12"):
A: Out The Box
B: All The Days
C: Harbinger
D: Fine As Dust
E: Lazy Rock
F: Life
G: Why Time
H: Zombie Life
