= Shine a Light =

Shine a Light may refer to:

- Shine a Light (film), a 2008 Rolling Stones concert film directed by Martin Scorsese
  - Shine a Light (Rolling Stones album), a 2008 soundtrack album from the film
- Shine a Light (Bryan Adams album), 2019
- Shine a Light (Calibre album), 2009
- Shine a Light (Constantines album), 2003
- Shine a Light (G-Dragon album), 2010
- Shine a Light (Billy Bragg and Joe Henry album), 2016
- "Shine a Light" (Banners song), 2016
- "Shine a Light" (McFly song), the second single from McFly's album Above the Noise
- "Shine a Light" (Rolling Stones song), a 1972 song from the album Exile on Main St.
- Shine a Light (Paolo Nutini song), 2022
- "Shine a Light", a song by The Apples in Stereo from Tone Soul Evolution
- "Shine a Light", a song written and performed by Kevin Ayers on The Unfairground
- "Shine a Light", a song by Spiritualized from Lazer Guided Melodies
- "Shine a Light", a song by Wolf Parade from Apologies to the Queen Mary

== See also ==
- Shine the Light, Inc., a non-profit organization that supports the radio station KKEQ in Fosston, Minnesota
- Love Shine a Light
- Eurovision: Europe Shine a Light
