= Fox Stevenson =

English musician and DJ (born 1993)

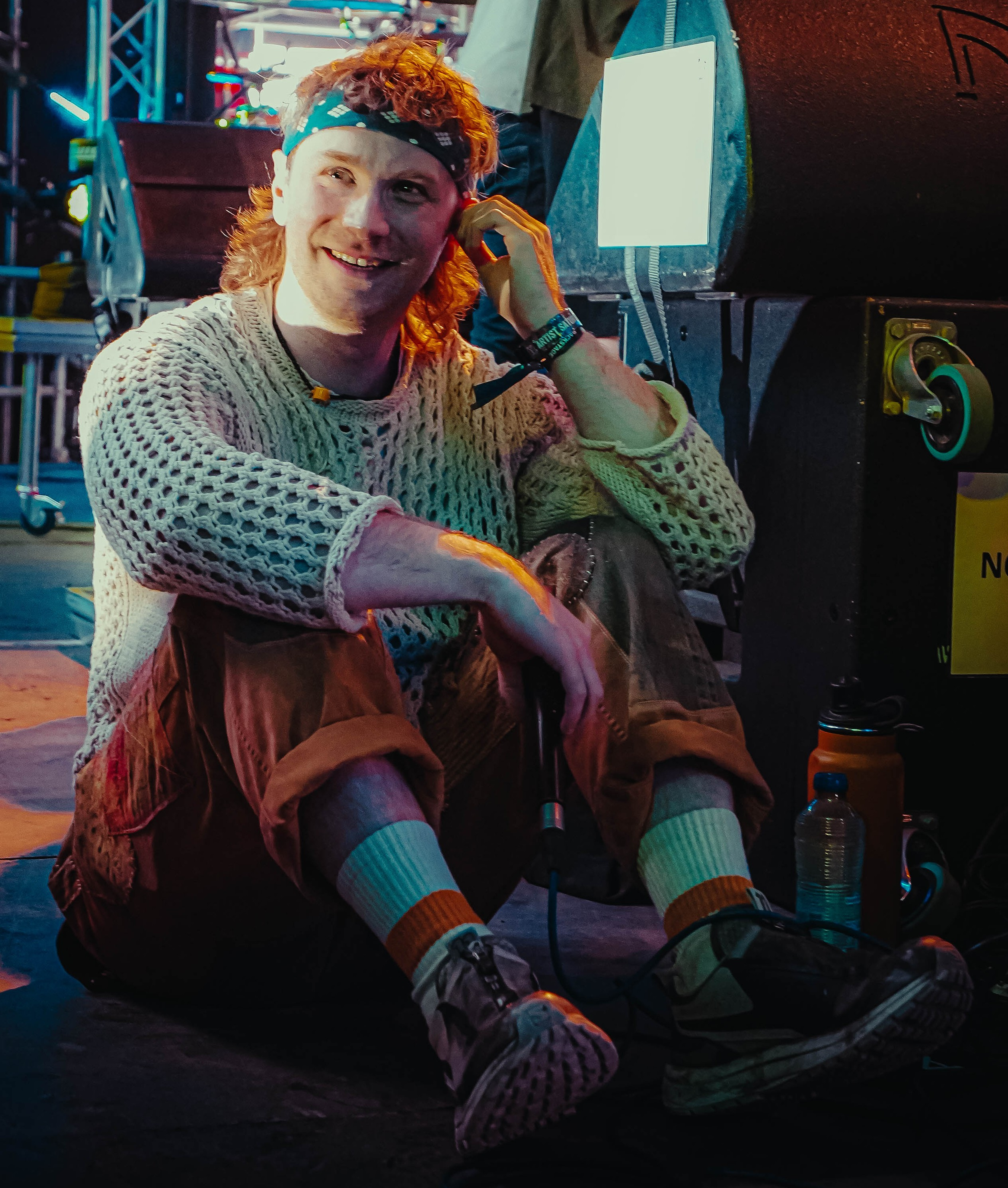
- Stevenson at the 2023 Liquicity Festival

Background information
- Also known as: Stan SB, Stan SSB
- Born: Stanley Stevenson-Byrne; 25 January 1993 (age 33)
- Origin: Leeds, West Yorkshire, United Kingdom
- Genres: Drum and bass, house, dubstep
- Occupations: Singer, songwriter, disc jockey, record producer
- Instruments: Vocals, synthesizer, guitar
- Years active: 2007–present
- Labels: Liquicity; Spinnin'; Firepower Records; Disciple; Cloudhead Records; Monstercat; Pilot Records; AntiFragile Music
- Website: foxstevenson.com

Stanley Stevenson-Byrne (born 25 January 1993), known professionally as Fox Stevenson, is an English singer-songwriter, DJ and producer. He is known for bass music, mostly drum and bass and glitch hop, and was formerly known as Stan SB or Stan SSB. He has released two albums and eleven EPs under Fox Stevenson, one under Stan SB, and has been featured on two compilations under Stan SB and eighteen under the name of Fox Stevenson.

== Music career ==
Stevenson's interest in electronic music production began in the early 2000s, when he made his first release on the website Newgrounds. He was 15–16 years old when he created his first vocal track. He later rose to prominence through the YouTube-based music community and nowadays an influential drum and bass label Liquicity, where "Cloudhead", one of his earliest tracks as Stan SB, was featured.

His works are also published to the audio distribution platform SoundCloud since 2012, under the alias Stan SB and from 2013 under the alias Fox Stevenson. In 2013, he released an EP titled Endless, the title track of which has since gained over 2.5 million listens on SoundCloud.

In 2014, he announced the launch of his own record label, Cloudhead Records, under which he released an EP titled All This Time in the same year. In July 2014, Stevenson released Throwdown, an EP accompanied by a live online premiere.

In August 2015, he released a collaboration on Spinnin' Records with British DJ Curbi, titled Hoohah. He signed with the dubstep label Disciple in March 2016 and in April 2016 released his first EP on the label, No Fox Given. On 12 September 2016, Fox Stevenson released a single titled "Rocket" on Disciple for the Alliance, Vol. 3 EP.

His debut album, Killjoy, was released on 18 October 2019. On 17 November 2024, he announced that he is working on his second album. He later revealed, on 24 May 2025, the name of the second album as Sunk Cost Fallacy. It was released on 27 June 2025, and received positive reviews.

== Genres ==
Stevenson is particularly known for creating drum and bass, liquid drum & bass, glitch hop, house and dubstep tracks. However, he is keen to experiment with many musical genres, stating that "there are tonnes of intricacies to each and every genre."

== Discography ==
=== As Stan SB ===
==== Extended plays ====
Title	Details
Anyone Out There	Release Date: 13 January 2013; Label: Subsphere Records; Format: Digital download

==== Singles ====
Year	Title
2012	"Your Own Way" (with Feint)
2012	"Dead"
2013	"The Secret" (with Candyland)

==== Remixes ====
Year	Artist	Title	Album
2012	Feint	"Horizons" (featuring Veela)	Horizons EP
2013	3OH!3	"Back to Life"	Back to Life (Remixes)

==== Notable compilation appearances ====
Year	Title	Album
2013	"Get What I Can"	Galaxy of Dreams – Liquicity Presents
2013	"Anyone Out There" (Maduk Remix)	Galaxy of Dreams – Liquicity Presents
2015	"Anyone Out There"	Liquicity Memoirs

=== As Fox Stevenson ===
==== Albums ====
Title	Details
Killjoy	Release Date: 18 October 2019; Label: AntiFragile Music; Format: CD, Digital download, LP
Sunk Cost Fallacy	Release Date: 27 June 2025; Label: Pilot Records; Format: Digital download, LP

==== Extended plays ====
Title	Details
Endless	Release Date: 15 October 2013; Label: Firepower Records; Format: Digital download
Turn It Up	Release Date: 25 March 2014; Label: Cloudhead Records; Format: Digital download
All This Time	Release Date: 26 May 2014; Label: Cloudhead Records; Format: Digital download
Throwdown	Release Date: 15 July 2014; Label: Firepower Records; Format: Digital download
Free Stuff	Release Date: 21 September 2015; Format: Digital download
No Fox Given	Release Date: 18 April 2016; Label: Disciple Recordings; Format: Digital download
Seoul Remix	Release Date: 31 May 2017; Label: Cloudhead Records; Format: Digital download
For Fox Sake	Release Date: 27 October 2017; Label: Disciple Recordings; Format: Digital download
Take You Down / Melange	Release Date: 12 March 2018; Label: Liquicity Records; Format: Digital download
Glue Gun / Never Before	Release Date: 21 May 2018; Label: Liquicity Records; Format: Digital download
Enemy Brain Entertainment Suite	Release Date: 1 February 2023; Label: Pilot Records; Format: Digital download

==== Singles ====
Year	Title	Peak chart positions	
Year	Title	NED	BEL
2013	"Sandblast"	—	—
2014	"Tico"	—	—
2014	"Sweets (Soda Pop)"	16	28
2014	"Sandblast" (VIP)	—	—
2015	"Hoohah" (with Curbi)	—	—
2015	"Comeback"	—	—
2016	"Rocket"	—	—
2016	"Flash"	—	—
2016	"Hoohah (VIP Edit)" (with Curbi)	—	—
2017	"Chatterbox" (with Mesto)	—	—
2017	"Knowhow"	—	—
2017	"Funky Uncle"	—	—
2017	"Arigatou"	—	—
2017	"Lighthouse" (with Ookay)	—	—
2018	"Bulgogi"	—	—
2018	"Something"	—	—
2018	"Out on My Own"	—	—
2018	"Peace of Mind"	—	—
2018	"Bruises"	—	—
2019	"Out My Head"	—	—
2019	"Out My Head (145 Remix)"	—	—
2019	"Go Like"	—	—
2019	"Go Like (D&B Mix)"	—	—
2019	"Okay"	—	—
2019	"Killjoy"	—	—
2019	"Cavalier"	—	—
2019	"Hold Steady"	—	—
2019	"Dreamland"	—	—
2019	"Perfect Lie"	—	—
2019	"Headlights"	—	—
2020	"Like That"	—	—
2020	"Lava"	—	—
2020	"Don't Care Crown"	—	—
2020	"New Amsterdam"	—	—
2020	"Just Don't Mind"	—	—
2020	"All Eyes on Me"	—	—
2021	"Ether"	—	—
2021	"Good Time"	—	—
2022	"Enemy Brain"	—	—
2022	"Get Through"	—	—
2022	"Victory Over Truth"	—	—
2022	"Can't Even Tell"	—	—
2023	"Deja Vu"	—	—
2023	"Love The Day"	—	—
2024	"Lemonade"	—	—
2024	"Sorry"	—	—
2024	"Don't Know What"	—	—
2024	"Got What I Got"	—	—
2024	"Pieces (with Yue)"	—	—
2025	"That Choice"	—	—
2025	"Curtain Call"	—	—
2025	"Exile Is A Habit"	—	—
2025	"Memories"	—	—
2025	"Road To Nothing"	—	—
2025	"Give Me Some Space"	—	—
2025	"What Are You (Wow)"	—	—
"—" denotes a recording that did not chart or was not released.

==== Remixes ====
Year	Artist	Title	Album
2013	Stafford Brothers	"Hands Up (FMF 2013 Anthem)" (featuring Lil Jon)	Hands Up (FMF 2013 Anthem) EP
2013	Candyland & MakO	"All You Gotta DO" (featuring Maksim)	—N/a
2014	Dodge & Fuski and Nick Thayer	"Playboy"	Playboy (Fox Stevenson Remix)
2014	COOPER	"This Year"	—N/a
2014	Flux Pavilion	"Gold Love" (featuring Rosie Oddie)	Freeway Remixes
2015	Priority One and TwoThirds	"City Needs Sleep"	Alchemy – Liquicity Presents
2016	Zedd	"I Want You to Know" (featuring Selena Gomez)	I Want You to Know (feat. Selena Gomez) Remixes
2018	Crankdat	"Reasons to Run"	Reasons to Run (Remixes)
2019	Fox Stevenson	"Out My Head"	Out My Head (Fox Stevenson & Feint Remix)
2019	Maduk & Denis Pedersen	"Miles Apart"	Liquicity Reflections 3
2020	Feint	"Outbreak" (featuring Mylk)	Rocket League x Monstercat - Legacy
2021	Koven	"YES"	Butterfly Effect (Deluxe)
2021	SHINee	"Don't Call Me"	iScreaM Vol.7 : Don't Call Me Remixes
2022	DJ Fresh	"Gold Dust"	Gold Dust (10th Anniversary Remixes)

==== Notable compilation appearances ====
Year	Title	Album
2013	"Sandblast"	Shell Shock Vol. 2
2014	"Tico"	Grand Central
2015	"Sandblast (VIP)"	Cloudheaded Vol. 1
2016	"Saloon (VIP)"	Reinforcements Vol. 4
2016	"Rocket"	Alliance Vol. 3
2016	"Flash"	Alchemy 2
2017	"Knowhow"	Rampage
2017	"Rocket"	Apocalypse
2017	"Funky Uncle"	We Are Kin Vol. 2
2017	"Lighthouse"	Monstercat Uncaged Vol. 3
2018	"Something"	Galaxy of Dreams 3
2018	"Out on My Own"	Disciple x Jericho
2018	"Peace of Mind"	Alliance Vol. 4
2018	"Bruises"	Destinations Vol. 1
2018	"Take You Down"	Liquicity Drum & Bass 2018
2018	"The Heat"	Disciple x Miniladd
2019	"Here We Go" (with Barely Alive)	Alliance Vol. 5
2020	"Just Don't Mind"	Alliance Vol. 6

== Music videos ==
Year	Title	Director
2013	"Anyone Out There" (Maduk Remix)	Mateo Vega
2014	"All This Time"	Keith Creedy
2014	"Sweets (Soda Pop)"	San Charoenchai
2015	"High Five!"	Justin Donnelly
2015	"Hoohah (with Curbi)"	hekje
2015	"Comeback"	Tom Anderson
2017	"Arigatou"	Luc Trombini
2019	"Out My Head"	Alexander Koht
2019	"Killjoy"	Alexander Koht
2020	"Like That"	Bailey Hyatt
2021	"Don't Call Me (Fox Stevenson Remix)"	Unknown
