= Haliene discography =

The discography of American singer Haliene consists of five lead singles, ten featured singles and twelve guest appearances. Her discography as Kelly Sweet consists of two studio albums, two extended plays (EPs), six lead singles, five featured singles and one song from a motion picture soundtrack. She has released songs on electronic music record labels such as Ultra Records and Armada Music. Her debut single "We Are One" as Kelly Sweet peaked on the Dance Club Songs chart at 25th. As Haliene, her collaborative singles "Twilight vs Breathe" and "Stars & Moon" have peaked at number 7 and number 26 on the Dance Airplay Chart

== Haliene ==
Haliene discography
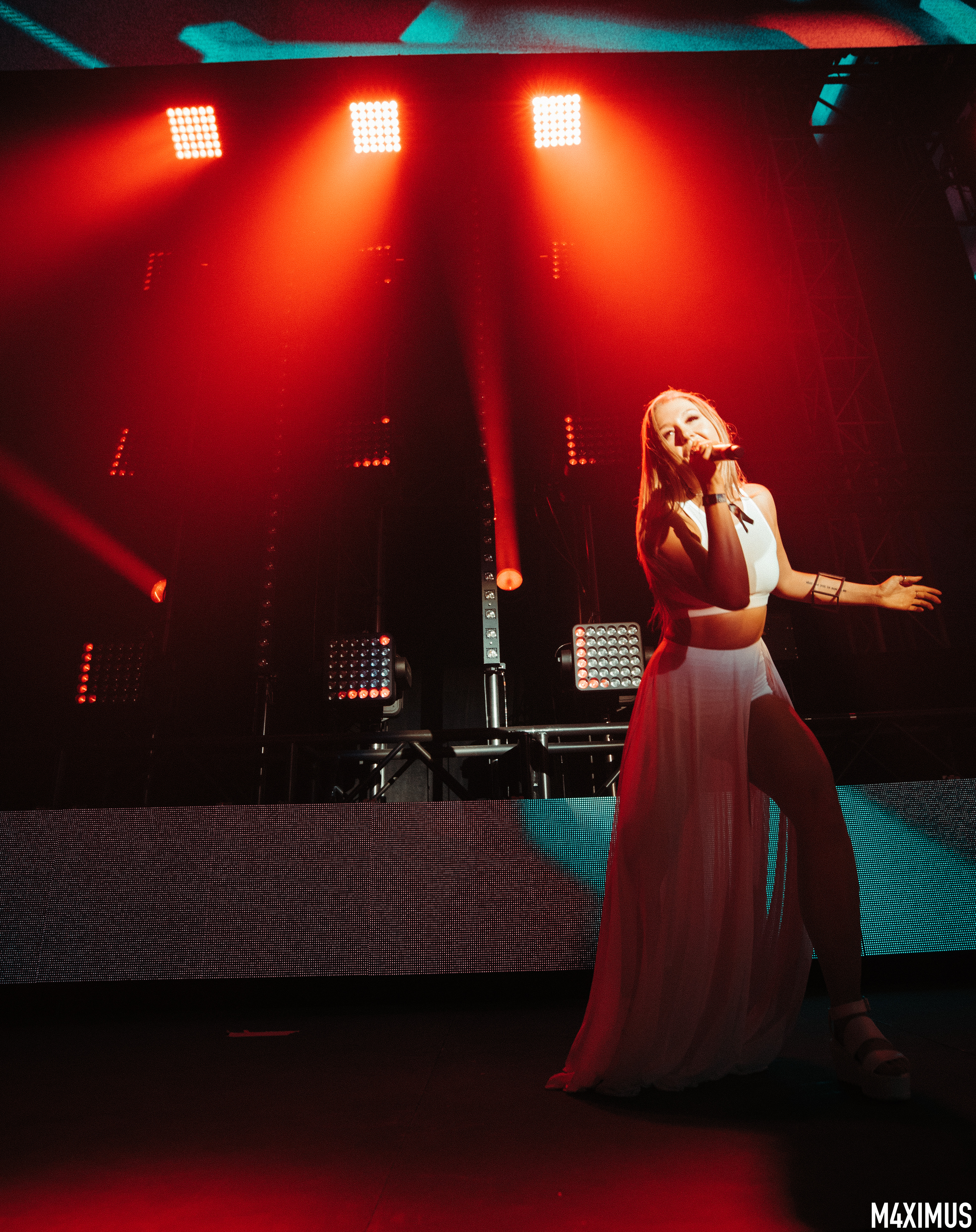
- Haliene performing at Electric Daisy Carnival 2017
- Studio albums: 2
- Singles: 21

=== Studio albums ===
Title	Details
Heavenly	Released: August 26, 2022; Label: Black Hole Recordings; Format: Digital download, vinyl, CD
Eclipsed	Released: August 21, 2026; Label: Black Hole Recordings; Format: Digital download, vinyl, CD

=== Extended plays ===
Title	Details
Water	Released: October 11, 2024; Label: Ophelia Records; Format: Digital download

=== Singles ===
==== As lead artist ====
Title	Year	Peak chart positions		Label	Album
Title	Year	US Dance	US Airplay	Label	Album
"Wherever You Are" (with Ferry Corsten)	2017	—	—	Flashover	Blueprint
"Deep End" (with Standerwick)	2018	—	—	Armind	Non-album singles
"Run to You" (with Joel Hirsch)	2018	—	—	A State of Trance	Non-album singles
"Dream in Color"	2018	—	—	Monstercat	Monstercat Instinct, Vol. 1
"In the Dark" (with Andrew Rayel)	2018	—	—	InHarmony Music	Non-album singles
"Whisper" (with Marlo)	2019	—	—	Reaching Altitude	Non-album singles
"Take All of Me" (with Andrew Rayel)	2019	—	—	InHarmony Music	Non-album singles
"Ave Maria" (with Markus Schulz)	2019	—	—	Armind	Non-album singles
"Footprints" (with Morgan Page)	2019	—	—	Armada Music	Non-album singles
"Breathe in the Moment" (with Apek and Man Cub)	2019	—	—	Enhanced	Non-album singles
"Walk Through Walls"	2020	—	—	Black Hole	Non-album singles
"Erase You" (with Excision and Wooli)	2020	—	—	Subsidia	Non-album singles
"Castles in the Sky" (with Marlo and Triode)	2020	—	—	Central Station	Non-album singles
"Say Hello" (with Marlo)	2020	—	—	Reaching Altitude	Non-album singles
"Anywhere" (with Adventure Club and ARMNHMR)	2021	—	—	Ultra Records	Non-album singles
"In My Mind" (with Illenium and Excision)	2021	22	—	Warner	Fallen Embers
"Was It You" (with Au5)	2021	—	—	Enhanced	Non-album singles
"Oceans & Galaxies" (with Jauz)	2021	—	—	Monstercat	Non-album singles
"Make It To Tomorrow" (with Maratone)	2021	—	—	Abora Recordings	Non-album singles
"Glass Heart"	2021	—	—	Black Hole	Heavenly
"Losing My Mind" (with Tritonal)	2022	—	—	Enhanced Recordings	Non-album single
"Hollow" (with Elephante)	2023	—	31	Black Hole	Heavenly [Divine Edition]
"Other Side of the World" (with Craig Connelly)	2023	—	—	Black Hole	Non-album single
"Stardust" (with Crystal Skies)	2023	—	—	Lost In Dreams	Stardust
"Death of a Star" (with Markus Schulz)	2024	—	—	Coldharbour Recordings	Non-album singles
"Another Day" (with MitiS & Abandoned)	2024	—	—	Ophelia Records	Non-album singles
"Silence" (with Blanke)	2024	—	—	Ophelia Records	Non-album singles
"Memory of You"	2024	—	—	Ophelia Records	Water
"Take Your Light" (with NURKO)	2024	—	—	Ophelia Records	Water
"In My Bones" (with Egzod & CHPTR.)	2024	—	—	Lowly	Non-album singles
"Reach You" (with Mesa & Boss & Vorwerk)	2024	—	—	Liftoff Recordings	Non-album singles
"Say It To Me" (with SABAI & ANDe)	2025	—	—	IKIGAI Music	Fuck It, I'm Alright
"Cold as Snow" (with Seven Lions)	2025	—	—	Ophelia Records	Asleep in the Garden of Infernal Stars
"Orbit" (with Koven)	2025	—	—	UKF	Eclipsed
"Eclipsed By You" (with Ilan Bluestone)	2026	—	—	Black Hole	Eclipsed
"Solar Waves"	2026	—	—	Black Hole	Eclipsed
"Right Love"	2026	—	—	Black Hole	Eclipsed
"Don't Give Up On Me" (with Nikademis)	2026	—	—	Black Hole	Eclipsed
"Voltage" (with Miyuki)	2026	—	—	Black Hole	Eclipsed
"—" denotes a recording that did not chart or was not released.

==== As featured artist ====
Title	Year	Peak chart positions		Album
Title	Year	US Dance	US Airplay	Album
"Stars & Moon" (Breathe Carolina and Shanahan featuring Haliene)	2015	—	26	Enhanced Best of 2015
"Rush Over Me" (Seven Lions, Illenium and Said the Sky featuring Haliene)	2016	50 (Note: "Rush Over Me" also entered the Dance/Electronic Digital Songs at number 35.)	—	Non-album singles
"High" (Danny Avila featuring Haliene)	2016	—	—	Non-album singles
"Search and Rescue" (Gareth Emery Remix) (Project 46 featuring Haliene)	2016	—	—	Non-album singles
"Saving Light" (Gareth Emery and Standerwick featuring Haliene)	2017	—	—	Non-album singles
"Pages" (ATB featuring Haliene)	2017	—	—	Next
"See the Sky" (Breathe Carolina and Jay Cosmic featuring Haliene)	2017	—	—	Sleepless
"Horizon" (Seven Lions, Tritonal and Kill the Noise featuring Haliene)	2018	—	—	Non-album singles
"Bring Me to Life" (Da Tweekaz featuring Haliene)	2018	—	—	Non-album singles
"Twilight vs Breathe" (Adam K & Soha featuring Haliene and Matthew Steeper)	2018	—	7	Non-album singles
"Kaleidoscope" (Praana and Matt Fax featuring Haliene)	2019	—	—	Non-album singles
"Long Way Home" (Tritonal, Schala and Jorza featuring Haliene) (Note: Some "Long Way Home" media credit Haliene as a co-artist instead of as a featured artist.)	2020	—	9	Non-album singles
"Don't Wanna Fall" (Seven Lions and Last Heroes featuring Haliene)	2020	— (Note: "Don't Wanna Fall" did not enter the Hot Dance/Electronic Songs chart but did enter the Dance/Electronic Digital Songs at number 21.)	—	Non-album singles
"New Dawn" (Dash Berlin featuring Haliene)	2020	—	—	Non-album singles
"Save Tonight" (SLANDER featuring Haliene)	2025	—	—	Non-album singles
"Golden" (Sabai featuring Haliene and Jianne)	2025	—	—	Non-album singles
"—" denotes a recording that did not chart or was not released.

=== Guest appearances ===
Title	Year	Other artist(s)	Album
"Human Beings"	2015	Michael Badal	Now That We're Human
"The End"	2015	Seven Lions	The Throes of Winter
"Meteorites"	2016	Noah Neiman	Mind After Midnight
"Shadows"	2016	Mooij	Light Years From Home
"Never Say Goodbye"	2016	Koko & Bayati	Wonderful Rocky Road
"Revelation"	2017	Blasterjaxx	XX Files
"Here We Are"	2017	Ferry Corsten	Blueprint
"Edge of the Sky"	2017	Ferry Corsten	Blueprint
"Piece of You"	2017	Ferry Corsten	Blueprint
"Another Sunrise"	2017	Ferry Corsten and Eric Lumiere	Blueprint
"Breathe Us to Life"	2017	Aly & Fila	Beyond the Lights
"Paralyzed"	2017	Aly & Fila	Beyond the Lights
"Tidal Wave"	2020	Markus Schulz	Escape

== Kelly Sweet ==
Kelly Sweet discography
- Studio albums: 2
- EPs: 2
- Singles: 11

=== Studio albums ===
Title	Details
We Are One	Released: March 6, 2007; Label: Razor & Tie, Concord Music; Format: Digital download, CD
Ashes of My Paradise	Released: August 22, 2012; Label: Japan Victor Company; Format: Digital download

=== Extended plays ===
Title	Details
Sweet Christmas	Released: January 1, 2007; Label: Razor & Tie; Format: Digital download, CD
Sweet & Holy Gift	Released: November 14, 2007; Label: Razor & Tie; Format: CD

=== Singles ===
==== As lead artist ====
Title	Year	Peak chart positions	Album
Title	Year	US Club	Album
"We Are One"	2007	25	We Are One
"White Christmas" (featuring Dave Koz)	2007	—	Sweet Christmas
"Have Yourself a Merry Little Christmas"	2007	—	Sweet Christmas
"Silent Night"	2007	—	Sweet Christmas
"White Skies and Moonlight"	2012	—	Non-album singles
"In the Air Tonight"	2014	—	Non-album singles
"—" denotes a recording that did not chart or was not released.

==== As featured artist ====
Title	Year	Album
"You and I" (Punk Party featuring Kelly Sweet)	2014	Non-album single
"Gravity" (Kevin Wild and Punk Party featuring Kelly Sweet)	2014	Non-album single
"Superhuman" (Juventa featuring Kelly Sweet)	2014	Non-album single
"Fire & Ice" (Kevin Wild featuring Kelly Sweet)	2015	Non-album single
"Kinda High" (Dsrt featuring Kelly Sweet)	2017	Non-album single

=== Soundtracks ===
Title	Year	Movie	Artist
"I Will Be Waiting"	2006	Peaceful Warrior	Dan Millman
