= Liquicity =

Dutch liquid drum and bass label and promoter

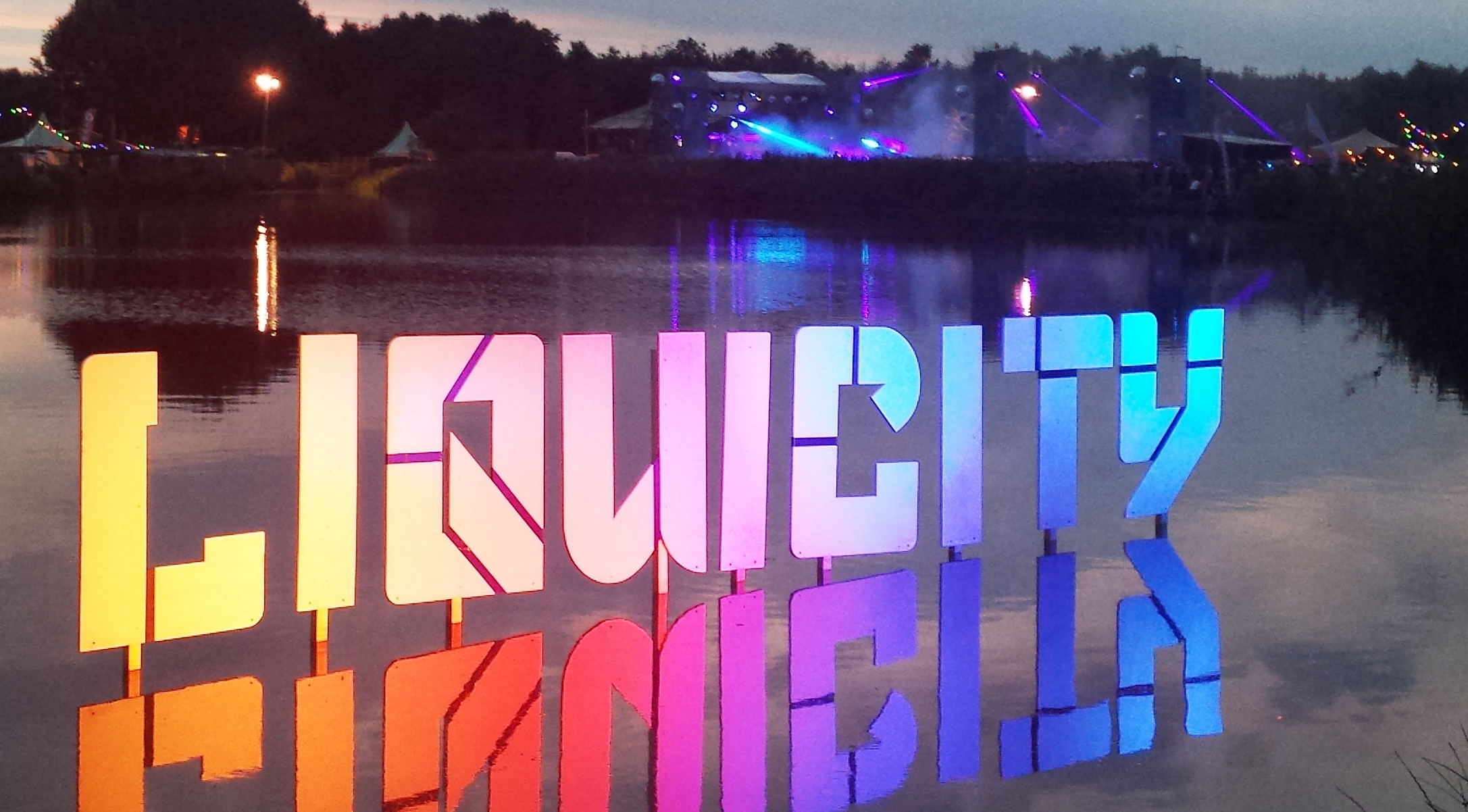
- Liquicity sign at Liquicity Festival 2016.
- Founded: 2008 (YouTube channel); 2013 (events and label company)
- Founder: Maduk
- Genre: Liquid drum & bass
- Country of origin: Netherlands
- Location: Amsterdam
- Official website: liquicity.com

Liquicity is a Dutch liquid drum and bass record label, YouTube channel and events promoter, run by Maris Goudzwaard, Boudewijn Kustner and Mark van der Schoot (better known by his stage name Maduk) since 2011.

== History ==
Netsky playing a liquid remix of "Waves" at Liquicity Festival 2015.

Maris Goudzwaard created his Liquicity YouTube channel in 2008, with the idea of starting an entirely new subculture within Drum & Bass. He curated a particular type of drum and bass music that had previously not been labeled, and by doing so gave shape to a worldwide music community. The channel quickly attracted fans –who would become known as "Liquicitizens"– with the same musical taste, and artists from the same genre featured on the channel gradually formed a close group.

In the summer of 2011, Goudzwaard heard Maduk's first track, "Avalon", and successfully contacted him to promote it on the Liquicity channel. The cooperation between the two evolved into a team, and Liquicity Records was established as a label a few months later. Since 2012, Maduk has recorded yearly mixes of the most frequently played songs by their label. In January 2013, they founded a new company for Liquicity events and label matters. Through the combination of music promotion, record label and events, the duo's hobby grew out to a full-time job.

== Events ==
In March 2013, the first small Liquicity event was held in Ruigoord near Amsterdam. Attracting liquid fans from across Europe, the sold-out event was a success. Several more events took place in Amsterdam and Antwerp, and in January 2015, Liquicity expanded to London. The first full-day Liquicity Festival was held on 26 July 2015 in Diemen forest near Amsterdam. According to Het Parool in 2016, video footage from the Liquicity Festival was viewed 185 million times on YouTube. Winter festivals were held in 2015 (Amsterdam), 2016 (Amsterdam and London) and in 2017 (Amsterdam), other Liquicity events in Cologne, Bratislava and Prague. The Liquicity Festival 2017 in Noord-Scharwoude has been the first to last a whole weekend. Due to the COVID-19 pandemic, both the 2020 and 2021 edition were postponed to 2022.

== Notable artists featured ==
Most of the approximately 100 acts promoted by Liquicity are British, Belgian or Dutch, with the majority of the remainder being of other European origins. Especially notable artists include:

- Delta Heavy
- Feint
- Fox Stevenson (formerly Stan SB)
- High Contrast
- Koven
- Maduk
- Makoto
- Muzz (formerly Muzzy)
- Seba
