= Maduk (musician) =

Dutch drum and bass musician

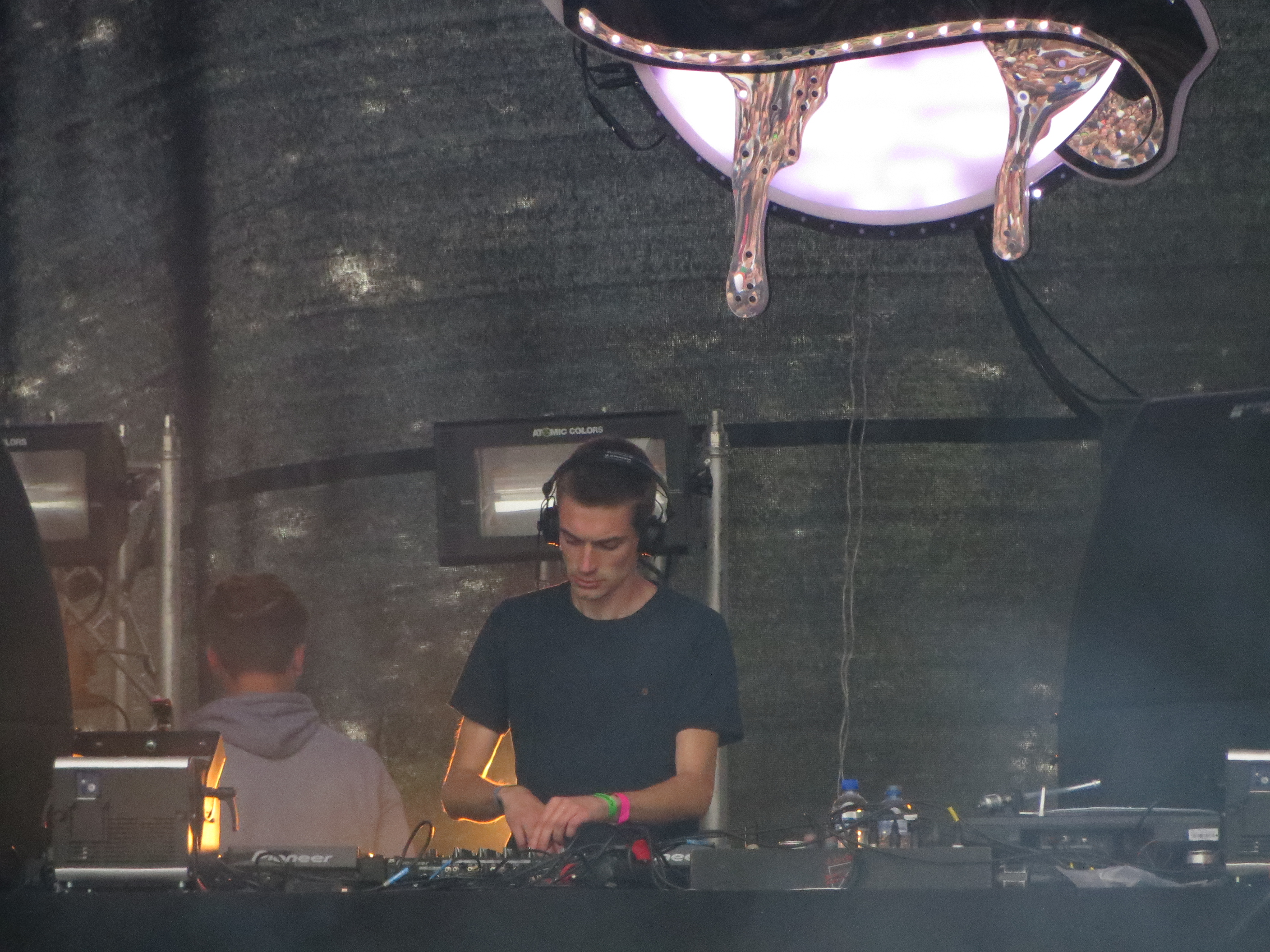
- Maduk performing at Liquicity Festival 2015

Background information
- Born: Mark van der Schoot; 4 October 1990 (age 35)
- Origin: Amsterdam, Netherlands
- Genres: Drum and bass; liquid funk; UK garage
- Occupations: DJ; record producer; musician
- Years active: 2011–present
- Labels: Hospital, Liquicity Records, Viper Recordings, Fokuz Recordings, Monstercat, NCS

Mark van der Schoot (born 4 October 1990), known by his stage name Maduk, is a Dutch drum and bass music producer and DJ from Amsterdam. He has released music on Hospital Records, Liquicity Records, Viper Recordings as well as Monstercat and Fokuz Recordings. He released his first album Never Give Up at Hospital Records on 29 April 2016. Together with Maris Goudzwaard, he founded Liquicity.

== History ==
He won the award for "Best Newcomer Producer" at the Drum and Bass Awards 2014, and the "Best Newcomer DJ" award in 2015.

== Discography ==
=== Albums ===
Album title	Album details
Never Give Up	Released: 29 April 2016; Label: Hospital Records; Format: LP, CD, Digital Download
Transformations	Released: 10 September 2021; Label: Liquicity Records; Format: LP, CD, Digital Download

=== Extended plays ===
Title	Details
Avalon EP	Release Date: 25 April 2012; Label: Liquicity Records; Format: Digital download
Take You There EP	Release Date: 14 May 2012; Label: Liquicity Records; Format: Digital download
Ghost Assassin EP	Release Date: 16 July 2012; Label: Celsius Recordings; Format: Digital download
Believe EP	Release Date: 9 December 2013; Label: Liquicity Records; Format: Digital download
Motions EP	Release Date: 27 October 2014; Label: Fokuz Recordings; Format: Digital download
