= Shine a Light (Calibre album) =

Shine a light

Studio album by Calibre
- Released: November 16, 2009
- Genre: Drum and bass, liquid funk, downtempo
- Label: Signature / Soul:R

Calibre chronology
Shelflife vol 2 (2009)	Shine a light (2009)

Very soon after the release of Shelf Life Vol. 2, Calibre stated he would be releasing his long anticipated down-tempo album. Shine a Light, the sixth album by Belfast singer-songwriter & producer Calibre, was released on November 16, 2009 through his own imprint Signature Records. This was his first downtempo album. For many years Calibre suggested that he wanted to produce one but he seemed to avoid the situation. “I have spent over 10 years writing music, the majority of my work being drum and bass, so i wanted to write an album that wasn’t attached to a particular musical genre, to me it felt like feeling my way in the dark”.

Although this was not a retrospective album like his previous release it still followed his conventional traditions such as not featuring many other artists apart from vocals which featured DRS.

== Tracklising ==
CD:

No.	Title	Length
1.	"The Truth" (Feat. DRS)
2.	"Change"
3.	"The Marchers"
4.	"Last Kiss"
5.	"Footprints"
6.	"Beyond"
7.	"Something I said"
8.	"The Tide"
9.	"Man On The Road"
10.	"Devise"
