= Olwik =

Swedish electronic dance musician and DJ

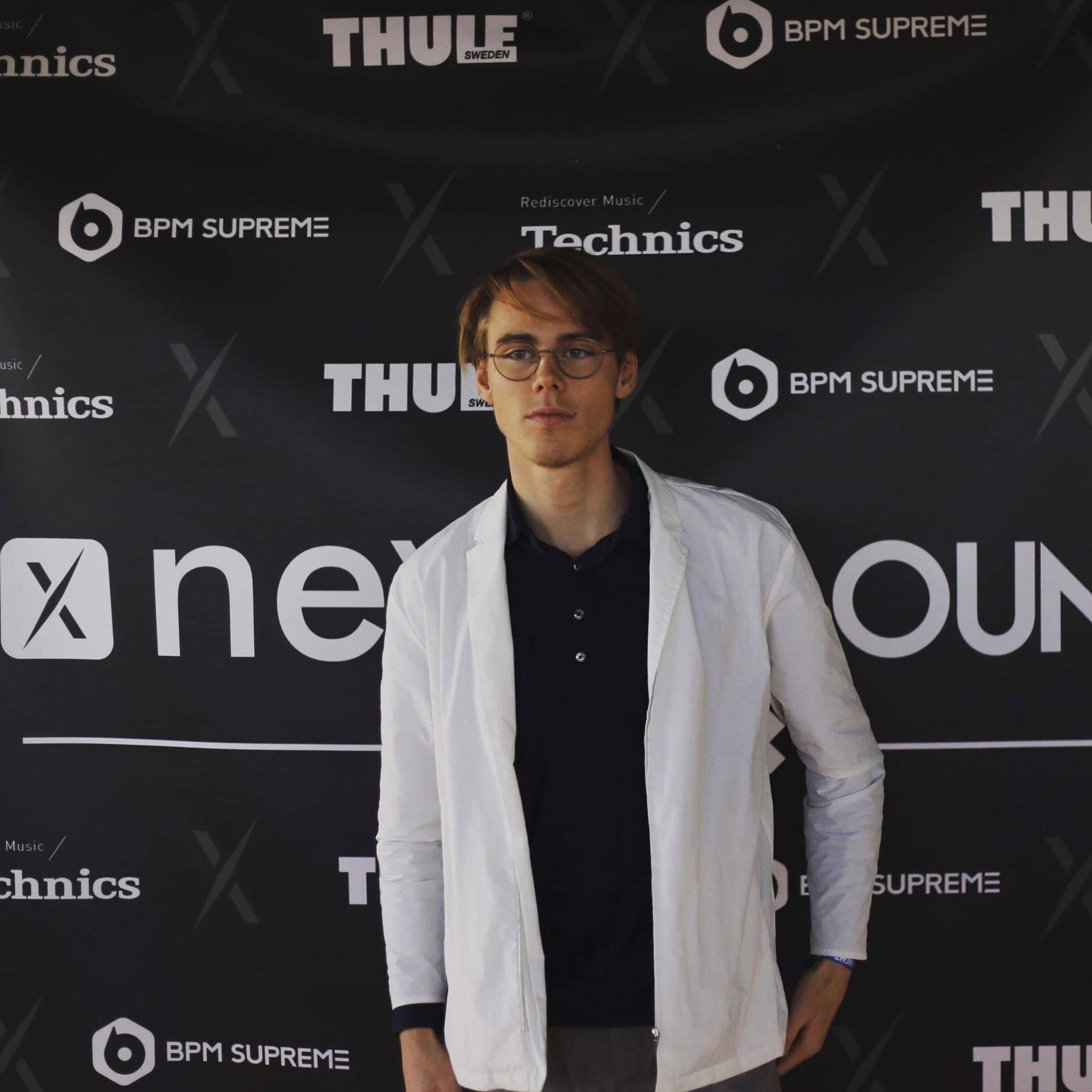
- Olwik at ADE 2018 by Max Van Aalst

Background information
- Born: Herman Olwik; 10 August 1996 (age 29); Gothenburg, Sweden
- Genres: Progressive house, house
- Labels: Sony Music; disco:wax; Warner Music; Spinnin Records; Source; NCS
- Website: http://olwikmusic.com

Herman Olwik (born August 10, 1996), also known as Olwik (stylised in all caps), is a Swedish electronic dance musician and DJ.

As a child, Olwik was immersed in music and is classically trained to play the viola, piano, drums and guitar. In an interview with music blog We Got This Covered, he stated that he became interested in producing electronic music when he was first introduced to a track called “Mellow” by Swedish duo Nause. In the same interview, he also stated that he "got inspired to create my own melodies later when I discovered Swedish producer Steerner, who was just starting to grow at the time."

== Career ==
Olwik's earliest productions were uploaded to the music platform SoundCloud, typically in the style of Progressive House. His very first release on record label NoCopyrightSounds, "This Life," went viral on SoundCloud and amassed nearly 2 million streams. His follow-up release "Villain" on NCS was widely covered by electronic music blogs and magazines, including YourEDM and Stoney Roads.

Known for both official and unofficial remixes, an early track that gained popularity online was "Shake the Earth" by Elephante, profiled by numerous online music outlets. Olwik's unofficial remix of Halsey's "New Americana" earned special recognition from Billboard Magazine as one of "The 7 Best Halsey Remixes." This release and recognition led to a contract with Danish dance music label Disco:Wax, which is owned by major label Sony Music. He released several times through the label, the first a collaboration with Blest Jones, "Know You Better," and the second a four-track EP in the fall of 2018. According to an Insomniac biography, his music has been played at festivals including Tomorrowland, Ultra Music Festival, and Electric Daisy Carnival in Las Vegas. Insomniac's website also states that OLWIK has earned support from Tiësto, MAKJ, and Blasterjaxx, and has shared the stage with Dada Life, and Michael Feiner. In 2018, he signed with Source Records / Spinnin Records, the dance music record label owned by Warner Music Group, to release the song "La La Light."

Beyond releasing music, Olwik is also a performing DJ. He has recorded several guest mixes for various publications, including Radar Mix 098 for Dancing Astronaut. In an interview with DMC World Magazine, he stated that he had recently toured for the first time outside of Sweden, at Output Nightclub in New York City and the Panda Electronic Festival in China. He later stated in an interview with Nexus Radio that he had played several more times in China in 2018, in Chengdu and then in Guangdong. In the same interview, he made the claim that he is inspired by science in his music.

== Discography ==
- 2019—Olwik & Willemijn May -- "La La Light", Spinnin Records/SOURCE
- 2018—Supercool [EP], Sony Music/Disco:wax Records
  - Olwik, Dance Cartel, Terri B! -- "You Got Me"
  - Olwik, Raie, Felix Abebe -- "Supercool"
  - Olwik, Blest Jones -- "Don't Matter"
  - Olwik -- "Strawberries"
- 2017—OKWIK & Terri B! -- "Baby Can I Hold You", Sony Music/LINC Sweden
- 2017 -- ROZES -- "Canyons (Olwik Remix)", Photo Finish Records
- 2017—Olwik & Blest Jones -- "Know You Better", Sony Music/Disco:wax Records
- 2016 -- Dia Frampton -- "Golden Years (Olwik Remix)", Nettwerk Productions Ltd.
- 2016—Olwik & Joshua Swerin -- "Finally"
- 2016 – Olwik & Terri B! – "Fight No More", Sony Music/LINC Sweden (Swedish Dance Charts #30)
- 2015—Olwik -- "Velocity", The EDM Network
- 2014—Olwik & Tyler Fiore -- "Villain", NoCopyrightSounds
- 2014—Olwik & Alexa Lusader -- "Taking Over", NoCopyrightSounds
- 2014—Olwik & Johnning -- "This Life", NoCopyrightSounds
