= Banashree Sengupta =

- Born: 6 May 1945; Hugli-Chuchura, Bengal Presidency, British India
- Died: 19 February 2017 (aged 71) SSKM Hospital, Kolkata, West Bengal, India
- Occupations: Singer

Banashree Sengupta (Bengali: বনশ্রী সেনগুপ্ত; 6 May 1945 – 19 February 2017) was a singer from India. She had given her voice in numerous Bengali, Hindi, Assamese, Bhojpuri, and Odia films during her long career.

== Early years ==
Banashree's father Shri Shailendranath Roy (Bengali: শৈলেন্দ্রনাথ রায়) was a noted Indian classical singer of Hugli-Chuchura, West Bengal. She was born to a family of Ayurveda doctors and their house in Chinsurah was known as Kabiraj Bari (doctors' house /Bengali: কবিরাজ বাড়ি). However, her grandfather and father were proficient artists in Indian Classical Music. Her father introduced her to Indian Classical music at an early age. She passed School Final Examination from Banimandir Balika Vidyalaya (Bengali: বাণীমন্দির বালিকা বিদ্যালয়).

== Learning Music ==
Apart from her father, Banashree received training in singing from various masters. Shri Rajen Bandyopadhyay imparted training in Indian classical music while she was at Chinsurah. After her marriage to Sri Shanti Sengupta in 1965, she moved to Kolkata. Here, she received training from several exponents of music in various branches, such as Khayal from Ustad Sagiruddin Khan, Pandit Usharanjan Mukhopadhyay and Pandit Shailen Bandyopadhyay, a folk song from Dinendra Choudhury, Geet and Bhajan from Kamal Ganguly, Najrul Geeti from Ramanuj Dasgupta and adhunik song from Rabindra Jain, Prabir Majumder, Neeta Sen, and Sudhin Dasgupta.

== Career ==
Banashree Sengupta started singing in Akashvani in 1964, where she rendered Geet, Bhajan, Adhunik, Rabindra Sangeet, Nazrul Geeti, and songs for children. Her first album was released from His Master's Voice in 1966.

She will be remembered for her outstanding performances in Tapan Sinha's movie Harmonium, Yatrik's Chhinnapatra etc. Her notable renditions are Aaj bikeler daake, Dur aakashe tomar sur, Andhokaarke bhoy kori, Sundor boner sundori gaachh and many others. She also sang in the 1976 Mahalaya program, Devim Durgatiharinim, where she rendered her voice in a duet with Manabendra Mukhopadhyay. The song was "Shudha Tarangini he leela rangini". However the song wasn't played in the radio program.

== Awards ==
Banashree received many awards. The government of West Bengal conferred the Sangeet Sanman award in 2012 and Maha Sangeet Sanman in 2013. Apart from that she received Uttam Kumar Award, Dishari Award, Bengali Film Journalists Association award, Pramathesh Barua award, Michael Madhusudan award, etc.

== Literary works ==
Though literature was not her domain, she contributed an article that is a pleasant read, published in a newspaper on 23 July 2016, describing the locality where she lived in Argya Abasan of Pratapaditya Road, Kolkata.

== Travel ==
Banashree Sengupta traveled to many countries to present her songs. She visited USSR as a part of the Government delegation in 1986. She attended North America Bango Sammiloni in Toronto in 1998 and Basanta Utsab in Toronto in 2011. She performed in Milton Keynes, Luton, London, and Glasgow in England, New York, New Jersey, Cherry Field, Long Island, Heart Ford, Boston, Tarrency City, Clave Land, and Florida in the USA, and Montreal and Toronto in Canada.

== Death ==
On 19 February 2017, Sengupta died at SSKM Hospital in Kolkata after a ten-day illness. West Bengal Chief Minister Mamata Banerjee expressed condolences, as did various members of the arts community. Her body was kept for public viewing at Rabindra Sadan before the cremation at Keoratolla burning ghat.

== See also ==
- List of Indian playback singers
