= Calibre (musician) =

Northern Irish music producer and DJ

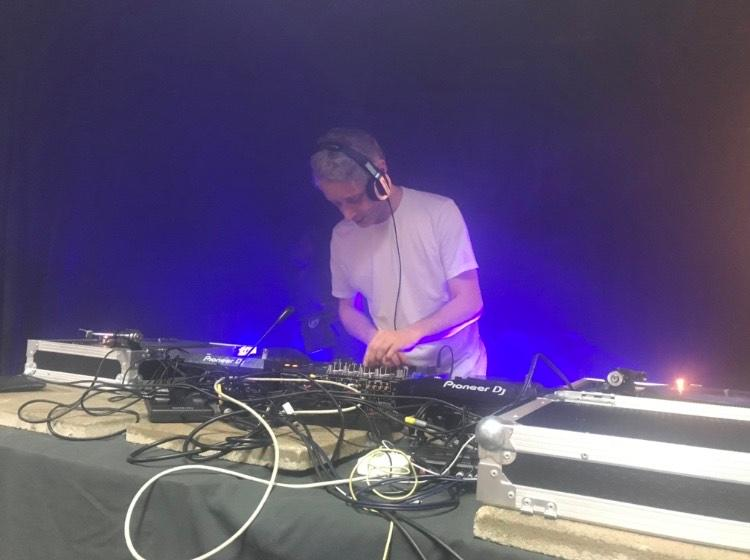
- Calibre playing in his hometown of Belfast, Northern Ireland in February 2019

Background information
- Also known as: Loose Dragon, Dominick Martin, Version
- Born: Dominick Martin
- Origin: Belfast, Northern Ireland
- Genres: Drum and bass, liquid funk, downtempo, ambient
- Occupations: DJ; musician
- Years active: 1995–present
- Labels: Quadraphonic, Creative Source, V Recordings, Soul:R, Signature Records, Br:nk
- Formerly of: Mist:i:cal
- Website: https://calibresignature.com

Dominick Martin, better known by his stage name Calibre, is a Northern Irish drum and bass music producer and DJ from Belfast. He is highly regarded for his influence on the liquid funk style of drum and bass, which was partially named after his distinct production style. He primarily releases his own works through his personal label, Signature Records, but has also released on labels such as Hospital Records, V Recordings, Creative Source and Soul:R.

Many of his productions–some of which were unreleased at the time–became synonymous with liquid funk due to DJ Fabio playing most of Martin's productions on his BBC Radio 1 show, Liquid Funk, and at Swerve club nights (originally known as Speed, which was co-ran with LTJ Bukem) in the early 2000s. Beginning in 2007, some of these unreleased productions would be released under the "Shelflife" series of albums alongside other works by Martin on his personal record label, Signature Records.

According to UKF, none of Martin's productions have been officially remixed by other artists, and he has stated that he is unbothered about bootleg remixes of his works. However, according to Fabio, Everything but the Girl were interested in remixing "Deep Everytime" from his debut album Musique Concrète in 2001, but by then he'd either destroyed or repurposed any recordings related to the song.

In 2019, Martin was awarded Critics Choice in the Drum&BassArena Awards 2019.

== Career ==
Martin was introduced to jungle and drum and bass by his brother in the early 90's. Initially not catching on to it, he started producing drum and bass in 1995 after being inspired by artists such as Goldie and LTJ Bukem. His first single was released in 1998 under the now-defunct Quadraphonic record label, which was closely associated with U2's The Kitchen nightclub located under the Clarence Hotel.

During this time, he gave a tape demo to LTJ Bukem, who never sought an official release after reaching back out to Martin.

Through Quadraphonic, he came to the attention of drum and bass DJ Fabio, who described all of his productions as "liquid funk" and signed Martin to his record label, Creative Source. Fabio would play dubplates of Martin's works on his BBC Radio 1 show and at Swerve nights at The Velvet Rooms.

The 12" single "Mystic / Feelin" soon released in 2000 on Creative Source, which "helped take sample-based drum & bass into the new millennium with agile two-step rhythms and laidback nostalgia sourced from funk, soul and reggae records," according to Beatport.

His debut album Musique Concrète released in 2001, named after the musique concrète compositions of John Cage, whom he was influenced by while attending the University of Ulster in Belfast. He was also influenced by French house production techniques. Although 21 songs were chosen for the final release of the album, between 200 and 300 songs in total were created by Martin during his time with Creative Source, most of which he claims to not remember making due to his alcoholism. Due to his prolific nature, he was asked to stop sending new tracks during the planning of the Musique Concrète album due to Fabio feeling overwhelmed with his output, and by 2003 Martin had felt creatively restricted.

In 2002, he released an EP, Tell Me, on John Tejada's Palette Recordings under his own name, Dominick Martin. It featured house music, a deviation from drum and bass.

In 2003, Martin would set up his personal label Signature Records after being influenced by Marcus Intalex & ST Files. He would also work closely with the duo under the project Mist:i:cal and their Soul:R label.

In 2004, he released Mr. Majestic, a collaboration with High Contrast. It was made in five hours (along with "The Other Side", featured on the B-side) after a set in Cardiff and has since then become a "cult tune" in drum and bass. In the same year, another anthemic release "Drop It Down" would be released. According to Martin, "this came about because of A-Sides. He was always telling me to work with MC Fats, who's on this track. He sent me a CD of some vocals he'd done from tracks from a couple of years ago that hadn't worked. There was just this one little 'drop it down' line in there that stood out for me. I put it on this track I had, which was made up of me sampling my own playing."

In 2005, he released Second Sun, which is considered to be Martin's best album according to Beat.

In 2007, he released the first Shelflife compilation, a handpicked collection of some of his unreleased works up to that point (most of which were created earlier in his career), as a way to look at his growth as an artist retrospectively. Songs are usually picked on a gut feeling and more recent Shelflife compilations (as well as other self-released albums in general) feature paintings from Martin as the cover art.

=== Remixes ===
In 2003, Martin was commissioned by Warner Music Group for a remix of "Put That Woman First" from Jaheim's Still Ghetto album (2002). Despite Jaheim's disapproval of the remix, 1,000 limited-edition white label vinyl records were pressed with permission from Warner due to the underground popularity garnered by the remix. In 2023, the remix was included on a compilation album for purchase on digital storefronts.

In 2019, a remix by Martin was included in an extended play of "Swan Song" by Dua Lipa.

== Discography ==
=== Albums ===
Year	Title	Record label	Release date
2001	Musique Concrète	Creative Source	25 September 2001
2005	Second Sun	Signature Records	24 October 2005
2007	Shelflife	Signature Records	1 October 2007
2008	Overflow	Signature Records	1 May 2008
2009	Shelf Life Vol. 2	Signature Records	18 May 2009
2009	Shine a Light	Signature Records	16 November 2009
2010	Even If	Signature Records	12 November 2010
2011	Condition	Signature Records	3 October 2011
2013	Spill	Signature Records	20 May 2013
2013	Valentia	Signature Records	15 July 2013
2014	Shelflife 3	Signature Records	19 March 2014
2016	Shelflife 4	Signature Records	26 February 2016
2016	Grow	The Nothing Special	23 December 2016
2017	The Deep	Signature Records	31 March 2017
2018	Shelflife 5	Signature Records	29 June 2018
2018	4AM	ThirtyOne Recordings	16 November 2018
2019	Planet Hearth	Signature Records	29 November 2019
2020	Shelflife 6	Signature Records	1 May 2020
2021	Feeling Normal	Signature Records	26 February 2021
2021	Shelflife 7	Signature Records	24 November 2021
2022	Double Bend	The Nothing Special	2 April 2022
2023	Shelflife 8	Signature Records	19 April 2023
2023	Rudy	Signature Records	10 October 2023
2025	Little Foot	Signature Records	23 May 2025
2025	They Want You	Signature Records	12 December 2025
2026	Tricklemore Sea	Signature Records	1 May 2026

=== EPs ===
Year	Title	Record label	Release date
2003	Just Fine	Creative Source	2003
2006	Late Night Squeeze	Signature Records	24 April 2006
2006	Corner Dance	Signature Records	May 2006
2006	Deranged	Soul:R	23 October 2006
2008	Roundhouse	Signature Records	11 September 2008
2008	Don't Mind	Signature Records	22 October 2008
2010	Judgement Day	Samurai Red Seal	7 June 2010
2011	Hummer	Samurai Red Seal	29 August 2011
2012	Renaissance EP	Footprints	19 November 2012
2015	Strumpet EP	EXIT Records	18 May 2015
2015	Fourfit EP	Soul:R	31 July 2015
2015	Dreamz Dub EP	C.I.A	18 September 2015
2015	Break That EP	The Nothing Special	18 January 2019
2019	Cowper Street EP	Signature Records	5 July 2019
