= Killing of Musa Khankhel =

Pakistani journalist

- Date: 18 February 2009; 17 years ago
- Venue: Swat, Pakistan, Khyber Pakhtunkhwa, Pakistan
- Cause: Shooting
- Deaths: Musa Khankhel
- Burial: Swat, Pakistan, Khyber Pakhtunkhwa, Pakistan
- Accused: Taliban
- Charges: Murder

On 18 February 2009, Musa Khankhel, a Pakistani journalist, was assassinated in Matta, Swat after reporting on the peace march of Sufi Muhammad, the leader of a Taliban group. Khankhel had worked for Geo News as a reporter for five years and was known as an "aggressive and courageous reporter".
