= Koven (group) =

English electronic dance music duo

- Origin: London, England
- Genres: EDM, drum and bass, dubstep, trap, house, pop
- Years active: 2011–present
- Labels: Monstercat, Viper, NCS, Liquicity, UKF
- Members: Max Rowat; Katie Boyle
- Past members: Kate Ashton (2011-2013)
- Website: www.kovenuk.com

Koven, sometimes stylized as KOᐯEN or KOVEN., are an English electronic dance music duo made up of producer Max Rowat and vocalist Katie Boyle. They are especially known for their drum and bass and dubstep, but also make trap, future bass, house, pop and other styles. The duo have released on various electronic music labels including Viper Recordings and Monstercat.

Rowat started the project in 2011 and had several vocalists prior to Katie Boyle joining in 2014. They have guested on BBC Radio 1 shows including BBC Radio 1 Dance Presents with Hybrid Minds. They released their debut album Butterfly Effect in 2020, which was nominated for Best Album at the 2020 Drum & Bass Arena awards.

== History ==
Max Rowat began the Koven project in 2011, posting his debut free EP "Wake You Up" on SoundCloud, with the title track including vocals by Kate Ashton. Rowat and Ashton released two more songs together: "Take It All" with Modestep and the project's streaming debut "More Than You". The duo also supported Modestep on their 2013 tour, before Ashton left the project later that year. Meanwhile, vocalist Katie Boyle was performing under the alias Katie's Ambition, and had provided vocals for several artists including Hybrid Minds, Rollz and High Maintenance.

In early 2014, they announced that Boyle would be joining Koven, and released their first single "Another Home". This was succeeded by a two part EP titled "Hereinafter", released on Viper Recordings. A follow up EP titled "Sometimes We Are" was released in 2015.

Koven made their debut on Canadian electronic music imprint Monstercat in 2016 with the song "Silence", followed by a 4 track EP titled "Come To Light", released on November 11 that year. They continued to release on Monstercat, with their 4th EP "Reality Reach" being released in 2018. In October 2019, they announced their debut album "Butterfly Effect", and the lead single "Your Pain" was released in November of 2019. The album was released on 13 March 2020. The album entered the UK Album Downloads Chart at number 93. A Deluxe edition was released almost a year later in March 2021, including 3 new original tracks and remixes by several artists, including The Prototypes, Fox Stevenson and Grafix.

In 2022, they announced a two-part EP titled "Higher Ground", with part 1 being released on Monstercat on 4 August 2022 and part 2 on 2 March 2023.

In October 2024, they released the single "Nervous System" in collaboration with Steve Aoki. This became the lead single from their second full length album "Moments In Everglow", which was announced in February 2025 and released on April 18 that year via Monstercat.

Koven have performed at major festivals including Tomorrowland, Glastonbury, and Reading and Leeds. Since 2018, Boyle has performed alone due to Rowat suffering from travel anxiety, and offers a hybrid DJ set alongside live vocals.

== Discography ==
=== Studio albums ===
Title	Details
Butterfly Effect	Released: 13 March 2020; Label: Monstercat; Formats: Digital download, CD, vinyl
Butterfly Effect	Released: 11 March 2021 (Deluxe); Label: Monstercat; Formats: Digital download
Moments In Everglow	Released 18 April 2025; Label: Monstercat; Formats: Digital download, vinyl

=== Compilations ===
- Retrospective (Viper, 2018)

=== Extended plays ===
- Hereinafter, Pt. 1 (Viper, 2014)
- Hereinafter, Pt. 2 (Viper, 2014)
- Sometimes We Are (Viper, 2015)
- Come to Light (Monstercat, 2016)
- Reality Reach (Monstercat, 2018)
- Higher Ground (Part 1) (Monstercat, 2022)
- Higher Ground (Part 2) (Monstercat, 2023)

=== Singles ===
==== As lead artist ====
Title	Released	Label	Album
"More Than You"	2013	Viper Recordings	Non-album singles
"Make It There" (ft. Folly Rae)	2013	Viper Recordings	Non-album singles
"Another Home"	2014	Viper Recordings	Non-album singles
"Revenant" (with Dabin)	2016	Kannibalen Records	Non-album singles
"Silence"	2016	Monstercat	Come To Light
"Lasting (Pt. 2)"	2017	Viper Recordings	Retrospective
"You Me And Gravity" (With Crystal Skies)	2017	Monstercat	Non-album single
"Figure"	2017	Viper Recordings	Retrospective
"Figure (Unplugged)"	2017	Viper Recordings	Retrospective
"With You"	2017	Viper Recordings	Retrospective
"My Love"	2018	Monstercat	Rocket League X Monstercat Vol. 2, Reality Reach
"Made of Glass" (with Joe Ford)	2018	Shogun Audio	Colours In Sound
"Board Game"	2018	Monstercat	Reality Reach
"Voices"	2018	Monstercat	Reality Reach
"Never Have I Felt This"	2018	NoCopyrightSounds	NCS: Reloaded
"Love Wins Again"	2019	Liquicity	Non-album singles
"About Me" (with Roy Knox)	2019	NoCopyrightSounds	Non-album singles
"Your Pain"	2019	Monstercat	Butterfly Effect
"Give You Up / Followers"	2019	Monstercat	Butterfly Effect
"All For Nothing / Shut My Mouth"	2020	Monstercat	Butterfly Effect
"Gold / Yes"	2020	Monstercat	Butterfly Effect
"Good Enough / For Me (BCee Remix)"	2020	Monstercat	Butterfly Effect (Deluxe)
"Numb / Worlds Collide (Grafix Remix)"	2021	Monstercat	Butterfly Effect (Deluxe)
"Feel" (with Delta Heavy)	2021	UKF	Non-album singles
"Say What You Want"	2021	UKF	Non-album singles
"Looking For More"	2021	NoCopyrightSounds	Non-album singles
"Take It Away"	2022	Monstercat	Higher Ground (Part 1)
"Lions"	2022	Monstercat	Higher Ground (Part 1)
"All We Needed"	2022	Monstercat	Higher Ground (Part 1)
"I'm Delighted" (with Cookie Monsta & Flux Pavilion)	2022	Circus Records	Non-album single
"Collecting Thoughts" (with ShockOne)	2022	Monstercat	Higher Ground (Part 2)
"Lions (VIP)"	2022	Monstercat	Higher Ground (Part 2)
"Get Through"	2023	Monstercat	Higher Ground (Part 2)
"The Outlines" (with Circadian)	2023	Monstercat	Non-album singles
"Chase The Sun" (Note: Cover of the 2001 song Chase The Sun by Planet Funk)	2023	UKF	Non-album singles
"Never Have I Felt This (VIP)"	2023	NoCopyrightSounds	Non-album singles
"Hooked" (with A.M.C)	2024	UKF	UKF15
“Nervous System” (with Steve Aoki)	2024	Monstercat	Moments In Everglow
"In The Echo / Change"	2024	Monstercat	Moments In Everglow
“Polarised” (with ÆON:MODE)	2025	Monstercat	Moments In Everglow
"Where My Heart Is / Time Is On Our Side"	2025	Monstercat	Moments In Everglow
"The High We Seek"	2025	Monstercat	Moments In Everglow
"Orbit" (with Haliene)	2025	UKF	Eclipsed
"bloOdliNEs"	2026	UKF	Non-album singles/TBA
"hEarTbeAt"	2026	Liquicity	Non-album singles/TBA
"wHERE the rhythm goes"	2026	UKF	Non-album singles/TBA
"juST to breAThE"	2026	UKF	Non-album singles/TBA

==== As featured artist ====
Title	Lead Artist	Released	Album	Label
Only Good Mistake	Alpha 9	2017	Non-album single	Anjunabeats
Another Lover	Ilan Bluestone	2017	Scars	Anjunabeats
In Your Arms	Hybrid Minds	2019	UKF10	UKF

==== Guest appearances ====
Non-single guest and compilation appearances
Title	Artists	Released	Album	Label
Take It All	Modestep & Koven	2013	Evolution Theory	Polydor Records
Pessimist	Koven & Memtrix	2014	Decade of Viper	Viper Recordings
Take It In	Feint ft. Koven	2016	Liquicity Alchemy 2	Liquicity
Take It In (Hybrid Minds Remix)	Feint ft. Koven	2017	Liquicity Escapism 4	Liquicity
Worth The Lie	MUZZ, Koven & Feint	2017	Monstercat Uncaged Vol. 3	Monstercat
Made of Glass	Joe Ford & Koven	2018	Colours In Sound	Shogun Audio
Lost	PhaseOne ft. Koven	2019	Transendency	Disciple
Catharsis	MUZZ ft. Koven	2020	The Promised Land	Monstercat
Catharsis X	MUZZ ft. Koven	2022	The X Saga	Monstercat

=== Remixes ===
Title	Original Artist	Released	Label
Ruff	Teknian	2011	Coalition-Audio
Suffocate	The Prototypes	2011	Shogun Audio
Levitate	Hadouken!	2013	Hadouken Partnership
Bump	Baby Blue	2013	Self-released
Move Into Light	Juventa (ft. Erica Curran)	2013	Cloud 9 Music
The Wolves	Amy Steele	2015	Coleteel Music
Getaway	Tritonal (ft. Angel Taylor)	2016	Enhanced Music
Cold Skin	Seven Lions, Echos	2017	Monstercat
Another Lover	Ilan Bluestone (ft. Koven)	2018	Anjunabeats
New Blood	Steve Aoki, Sydney Sierota	2020	Dim Mak Records
Someone To Love You	Tritonal (ft. Brooke Williams)	2020	Enhanced Music
Drifting	Tiësto	2023	UKF
Past Life	Felix Jaehn, Jonas Blue	2023	Virgin Records
In Every Life	Audien	2026	Enhanced Music
Carry Me Home	Above & Beyond, Zoë Johnston	2026	Anjunabeats
