= NoCopyrightSounds =

British record label

- Founded: 14 August 2011; 15 years ago
- Founder: Billy Woodford
- Genre: EDM; house; dubstep; trap; drum and bass; electropop
- Country of origin: United Kingdom
- Location: London
- Official website: ncs.io

YouTube information
- Channel: NoCopyrightSounds
- Years active: 2011–present
- Genre: Music
- Subscribers: 34.4 million
- Views: 12.5 billion

NoCopyrightSounds (stylised as NCS) is a British record label and YouTube channel that releases royalty-free electronic dance music. Originally starting as a music promotion YouTube channel, it has since reached 1 million paid downloads in 2017.

== History ==
NoCopyrightSounds was first founded in 2011 by "avid gamer" Billy Woodford. Woodford was having problems with his YouTube video game review channel and created the label to solve it. The label was described by Forbes as "a YouTube-first label that allows indie creators to use and even monetize its music freely as long as they give due credit back to the content owners."

In 2017, NoCopyrightSounds achieved a milestone of over a million sales of digital downloads, despite releasing music for free. The label manager Daniel J. Lee said "similar to services with a freemium model, NCS provides both the option to enjoy music for free but at the same time also enables fans to support the music across paid services", asserting that the label releases music for free and also sells them. Woodford, about the milestone, stated, "I'm immensely proud to have reached 1 million paid downloads, and believe this shows the growth and strength NCS has built over the years." He also commented that "the demand for fresh original music from creators is enormous and growing daily." By this point, the label had surpassed 13 million subscribers on YouTube.

In 2024, NoCopyrightSounds partnered with Geometry Dash, making over 1200 songs on the channel usable in the game, along with twelve additional songs that were added with event levels.

On 20 November 2025, NoCopyrightSounds filed a case against former distributor AEI Music Limited and a second company, later revealed to be Featherstone Music Limited, after the companies failed to pay £4 million in licensing fees and other royalties.

== Notable artists ==
- 32Stitches
- Aero Chord
- Brooks
- Cartoon
- Syn Cole
- Don Diablo
- Eden (formerly The Eden Project)
- K-391
- Koven
- Maduk
- Mason Musso
- Neffex
- Olwik
- Pyti
- Vikkstar
- Alan Walker
- Tyla Yaweh
