= 32Stitches =

Indian musician and DJ

- Born: Arpit Gawri; Chandigarh, India
- Genres: Electronic, trap, future bass, EDM
- Occupations: Music producer, DJ
- Label: Sony

Arpit Gawri, better known by his stage name 32Stitches, is a Mumbai-based electronic musician, DJ, and record producer. His music has been released on labels such as Universal Music, Trap Nation, NoCopyrightSounds, Sony Music and Music High Court.

== Early life and career ==
Born in Chandigarh, Arpit studied at ILM Academy. He obtained his second audio engineering degree from Point Blank Music School in London. Following that, he made his initial performances in London, Amsterdam and Mumbai.

He made his debut with Sony Music with the release of "Last Time" in 2016, and also co-founded his own record label and live experience brand Music High Court.

In 2017, he performed alongside San Holo and Droeloe at their debut show in India, and also performed at the Run the Trap showcase in Mumbai along with Fabian Mazur and LUUDE later that year, along with a debut show at Amsterdam Dance Event After Party the same year.

== Performances ==
List of Performances
Date	City	Country	Event	Notes
11 September 2014	London	United Kingdom	Bring the Noise	
6 October 2017	Delhi	India	San Holo & DROELOE Debut Show	Support artist
22 October 2017	Amsterdam	Netherlands	Afterparty for Amsterdam Dance Event	
2 December 2017	Mumbai	India	Run the Trap Showcase	Alongside Fabian Mazur, Holly, LUUDE
12 May 2018	Chandigarh	India	Trap Haveli	
30 November 2018	Delhi	India	Music High Court Throwdown	Support artist for ATLiens
2 December 2018	Pune	India	Music High Court Throwdown	Support artist for ATLiens
10 February 2019	Bangalore	India	Music High Court Throwdown	Support artist for TroyBoi
4 April 2019	Mumbai	India	Music High Court Throwdown	Alongside NXSTY
5 April 2019	Delhi	India	Music High Court Throwdown	Alongside NXSTY
19 October 2019	Amsterdam	Netherlands	Music High Court showcase at Amsterdam Dance Event	Alongside K?D, Snavs, PLS&TY, Tisoki, Holly
13 December 2019	Chandigarh	India	Social Represent	
4 January 2020	Hyderabad	India	Headline Show	

== Discography ==
32Stitches Discography
Song	Record Label	Release Date	Notes
Memoir	32Stitches	15 March 2016	
Last Time	Sony Music/The Groove Society	8 August 2016	
Tom & Hills - Lies	Universal Music	10 April 2017	32Stitches Remix
Keeper of the Realm	Artist Intelligence Agency / EDM.com	30 October 2017	
Remember This	32Stitches	9 February 2018	
Remember This	32Stitches	27 April 2018	JustLuke Remix
Fallout	Music High Court	8 June 2018	
Between Us	Illicit/Dance Fruits Music	20 July 2018	feat. Krysta Youngs
Fallout (Remixes)	Music High Court	24 August 2018	Remixed by Beauz, Far & Few, Zeus x Crona
Do to You	32Stitches	4 December 2018	
Heroes	Hinky/Dance Fruits Music	29 March 2019	feat. William Barry
Need You	Elixir	22 May 2019	
Are We There Yet	Hinky/Dance Fruits Music	14 June 2019	feat. BAER
Olympus	NoCopyrightSounds	10 July 2019	
Horror Show	Music High Court	13 September 2019	
Astronomia	Lowly Palace/Trap Nation	11 December 2019	with Hoober (Tony Igy Cover)
Rest in Paradise	Magic Music	15 January 2020	feat. Krysta Youngs & Julia Ross
Youth	Tribal Trap	24 April 2020	
Requiem for a Dream	Lowly Palace/Trap Nation	20 May 2020	
Wake Me Up When September Ends	Magic Music	6 August 2020	feat. Myah Marie (Green Day Cover)
In Between	Music High Court	11 September 2020	feat. BAER
Absorb	Elysian Records	25 September 2020	
Uncharted	NoCopyrightSounds	18 February 2021	
Freedom	NoCopyrightSounds	2 September 2022	feat. Chenda & Harley Bird
