= Bhaswati Chakraborty =

Indian singer

Bhaswati Chakraborty is a Hindustani Classical singer, lives in Patna, Bihar, India. She was born on 1 August 1973 in Malda, West Bengal, India.

== Early life and education ==
She was born in Malda, West Bengal, India to a Hindu family. Her father's name is Amalendu Chatterjee and her Mother's name is Rekha Chatterjee. Her father was a school teacher, and his aim was to make his daughter a famous professional Classical Singer. She passed 10th from Shahpur High School, Malda and graduated from Malda Women's College. She did Special Honors in Music from Rabindra Bharati University, Kolkata. She took her initial Talim in Music from Guru Mahendra Prasad. She took Hindustani Classical Music Talim from Pt. Alok Chattopadhyay and Light Classical Music Talim from Vidushi Purnima Chaudhuri in Kolkata, West Bengal.

== Achievements ==
- She has won the His Master's Voice Golden Talent Awards, in Hindustani Classical and Light Classical (Vocal), in the year 1993.
- She was also honored by Bihar Chief Minister, Mr. Nitish Kumar for her contribution to Indian Classical Music.
- She is also selected as a permanent member in Regional Selection Committee (Vocal Classical and Light Classical) in Centre for Cultural Resources and Training (Ministry of Culture, Government of India).

== Performances ==
She has performed in many states.

=== Bihar ===
- Performed in Sangeet Bihan (Organized by Government of Bihar)
- Matriudbodhan Ashram, Patna
- Chief Minister House, Patna
- Rajbhawan, Patna
- Magadh Mahila College, Patna etc.

=== West Bengal ===
- Shantiniketan, Bolpur
- Salt Lake City, Kolkata
- Chandernagore or Chandannagar
- Malda
- Farakka
- Jalpaiguri etc.

=== Orissa ===
- Civic Centre, Rourkela.
