= Magadh Mahila College =

College in Bihar, India

- Coat of arms
- Type: Undergraduate and Postgraduate College
- Established: 1946; 80 years ago
- Affiliations: Patna University
- Chancellor: Shri Fagu Chauhan
- Vice-Chancellor: Prof. Girish Kumar Choudhary
- Location: Patna, Bihar, India
- Website: magadhmahilacollege.org

Magadh Mahila College, established in 1946, is a women's college in Patna, Bihar. It is affiliated to Patna University, and offers undergraduate and postgraduate courses in science, arts and commerce.

== Accreditation ==
Magadh Mahila College was awarded A grade by the National Assessment and Accreditation Council (NAAC).
