= Liquid drum and bass =

Subgenre of drum and bass

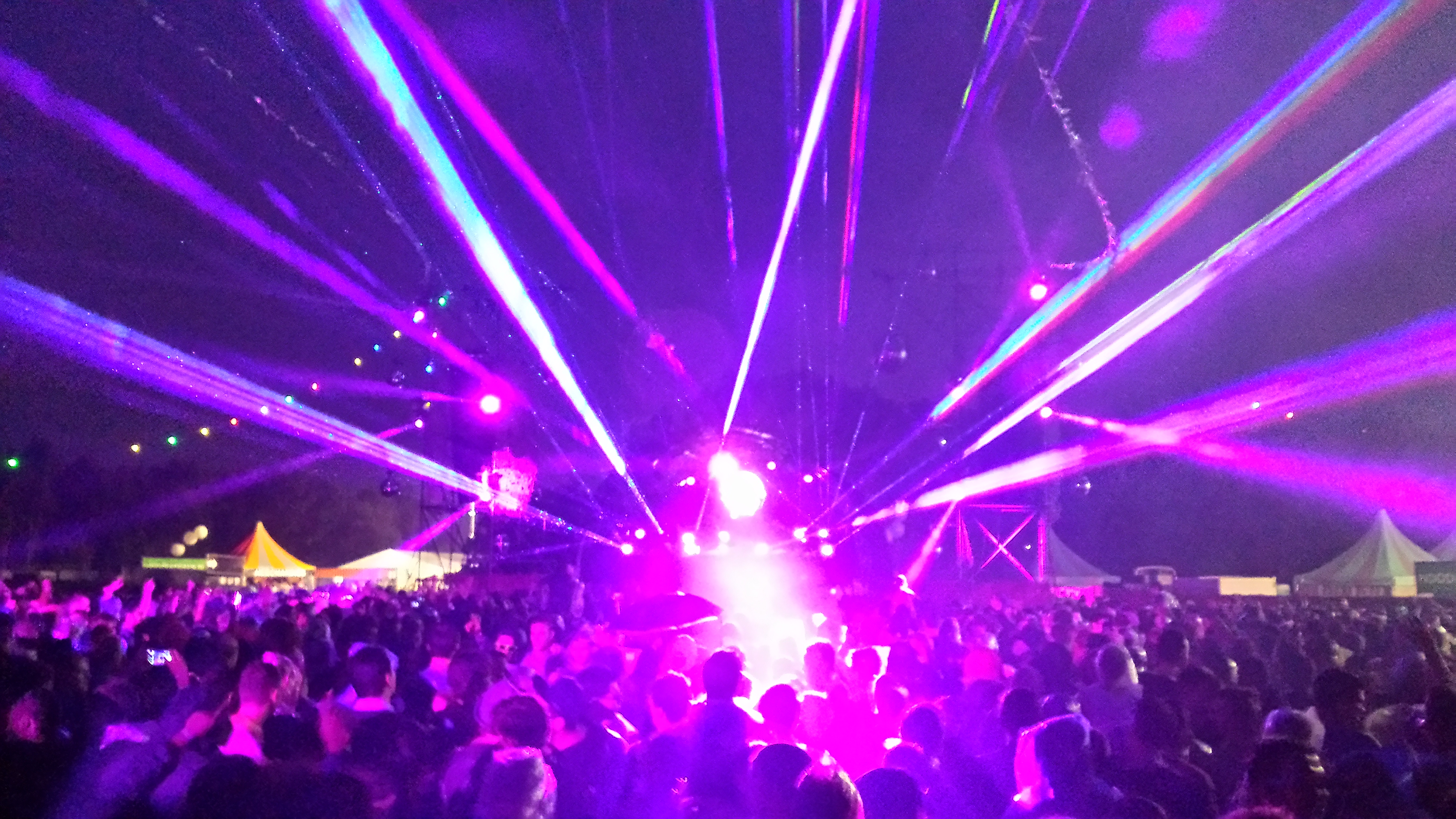
- Liquicity Festival 2015 was held in Amsterdam.
- Stylistic origins: Drum and bass; funk; ambient; oldskool rave; trance; soca; Latin music; acid jazz; post-disco
- Cultural origins: 1999, United Kingdom

An example of a liquid drum and bass track.

Liquid drum and bass, liquid DnB, melodic drum & bass, liquid funk, or sometimes just liquid is a subgenre of drum and bass. While it uses similar basslines and bar layouts to other styles, it contains fewer bar-oriented samples and more instrumental layers (both synthesized and natural), harmonies, melodies and ambiance, producing a sentimental atmosphere directed at home listeners as well as nightclub and rave audiences. Music genres such as jazz, soul and sometimes blues have a pivotal influence on liquid drum and bass.

== History ==
=== Origins ===
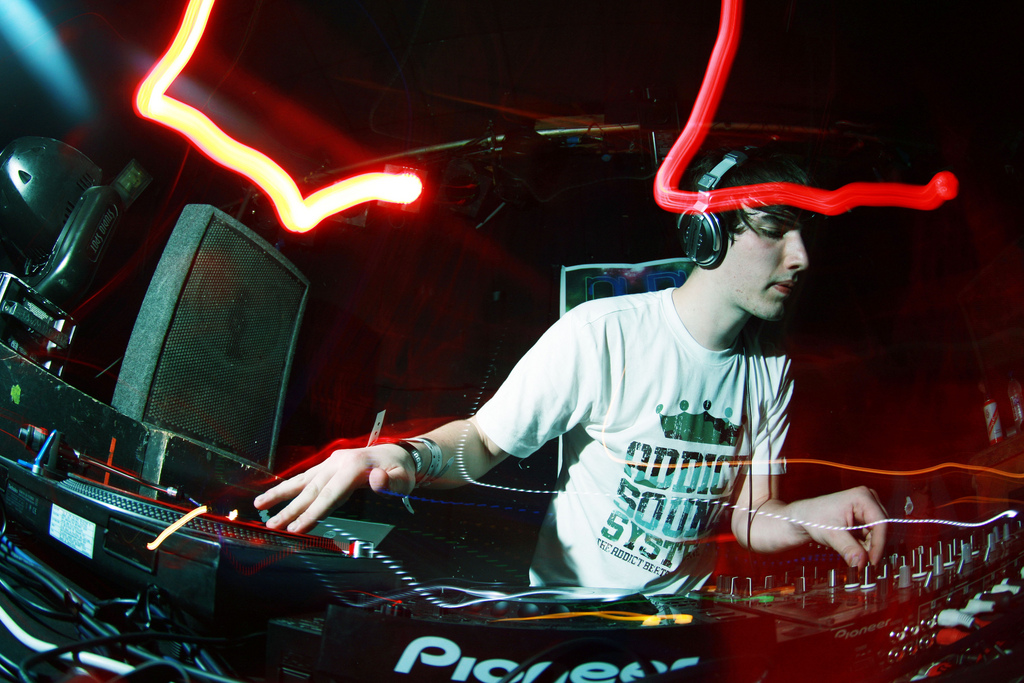
Netsky performing in 2008.

In 1999, Fabio alongside Sarah Sandy began championing a new form of drum and bass they called "liquid funk", with a compilation release of the same name on their Creative Source label. This was characterized by influences from ambient, funk, disco, house and trance music, and widespread use of vocals. Although slow to catch on at first, the style grew massively in popularity around 2003–2004, and by 2005 it was established as one of the biggest-selling subgenres in drum and bass, with labels like Good Looking Records (although this label is strongly cross-genred with atmospheric drum and bass), Hospital Records, Liquid V, Creative Source, Shogun Limited, Fokuz Recordings, and artists like Calibre, Netsky, LTJ Bukem, High Contrast, Logistics, London Elektricity, Nu:Tone, Shapeshifter, DJ Marky, Makoto, and Solid State among its main proponents.

Liquid drum and bass is very similar to intelligent drum and bass and atmospheric drum and bass, but has subtle differences. Liquid drum and bass has stronger influences from soca, Latin, jazz, disco, breakbeat, and funk music, while intelligent D'n'B or atmospheric D'n'B creates a calmer yet more synthetic sound, using smooth synth lines, deep bass and samples in place of the organic element achieved by use of real instruments.

=== Continued growth ===
Liquid music continued its growth from 2006 to 2009. On 1 October 2007, High Contrast brought liquid drum and bass back to the mainstream with his album, Tough Guys Don't Dance, releasing tracks such as "If We Ever" (featuring Diane Charlemagne) which made Radio 1's Dance singles chart, "Kiss Kiss Bang Bang", and "Tread Softly". This ended up "crossing over" and becoming one of the most listened to drum and bass albums of 2007.

Liquicity emerged as a YouTube channel in 2008, after 2011 gradually growing out to become a record label and events promoter for new liquid DnB artists, especially in the Netherlands, Belgium and the United Kingdom.
