= Cartoon (band) =

Estonian electronic dance music band

Background information
- Origin: Tallinn, Estonia
- Genres: Drum and bass; drumstep; EDM; future bass; house; indie dance; hardcore
- Years active: 2015–2017, 2020–present
- Labels: NCS; Dancing Dead; Liquicity
- Members: Hugo Martin Maasikas; Joosep Järvesaar
- Past members: Ago "Jéja" Teppand

Cartoon is an Estonian electronic dance music band formed in 2015 by Hugo Martin Maasikas, Ago "Jéja" Teppand, and Joosep Järvesaar. Their most successful song is "On & On" featuring Daniel Levi, which has over 550 million views on YouTube as of 2026.

They also have many other songs with millions of views, including "Biology" in collaboration with nublu and Gameboy Tetris, "Why We Lose" in collaboration with Coleman Trapp, and "I Remember U" in collaboration with Jüri Pootsmann.

In early 2024, Teppand left the project to pursue his solo career.

== History ==
=== Formation and breakthrough with "On & On" (2015–2016) ===
Ago and Joosep met in high school in Estonia in 2004, and they met Hugo at a party hosted by Ago. Cartoon was then formed in 2015 and gained attention when they released "Why We Lose" featuring Coleman Trapp on the British record label NoCopyrightSounds.

On July 9, 2015, Cartoon released "On & On" featuring Estonian-Mexican-American singer Daniel Levi. The song was featured as his third song on the NCS: The Best of 2015 album and was also released as his single on December 31, 2019 by Más Y Más / On & On AB. The song was a huge hit and received over 500 million views on NCS' YouTube channel. The song reached #1 on the Estonian airplay chart in its 39th week. On May 12, 2022, Cartoon released a Remixes EP of this song. The EP includes Time to Talk Remix, nuumi Remix, and Afe & Cole Phillips Remix.

In 2016, Cartoon participated in the Eesti Laul 2016 song contest with Kristel Aaslaid with the song "Immortality". They lost to Jüri Pootsmann in the finals and took third place.

On March 11, 2016, Cartoon released the song " I Remember U" featuring vocals by Estonian singer Jüri Pootsmann. The song was released as a digital download through NCS and peaked at number 1 on the Estonian airplay chart. This song is used as the theme song for the ADVChina YouTube channel. The video clip for this song became Estonia's most viewed music video on YouTube in 2016. Elsewhere, Cartoon has been ranked No. 1 in the Estonian Artists Top Charts 2016.

=== Disbandment, subsequent reunion and further success (2017–2023) ===
Cartoon went on hiatus in August 2017, but the band resumed activities in spring 2020.

On January 29, 2022, Cartoon released a new song, "Piranha," featuring rapper Pluuto. Along with the new song, a music video was also released. The song was released in collaboration with Discover Records and Sony Music. The music video was filmed and produced in Tallinn by Turkish audiovisual artist Bertan Can.

On March 25, 2022, Cartoon released the single "Whatever", a collaboration with Belgian producer Andromedik, which also features Estonian singer Jüri Pootsmann. According to Cartoon members, the song was born on the internet, as is common these days.

On July 8, 2022, Cartoon released the single "I'm Not Alright" featuring Estonian band Bedwetters. The song was released by French label Dancing Dead and also came with an animated music video by Reimo Õun. On the same day, they performed at the Beach Grind Festival in Pärnu, Estonia.

Cartoon had planned to do an NCS remix of Alan Walker's track "Dreamer", due out in April 2023. However, it was canceled for unknown reasons. In July 2023, "On & On" was certified Silver by the British Phonographic Industry (BPI). In September, it was certified Gold by the Recording Industry Association of America (RIAA).

Their songs have grown in popularity mainly thanks to YouTube videos that have over 850 million views. It has also received a significant number of plays on Spotify, over 500 million times.

=== Departure of Teppand, Eurovision Song Contest and further releases (2024–present) ===
In early 2024, Cartoon announced that Ago Teppand would leave the project to pursue a solo career under the moniker 'Jéja', which led to Teppand being credited separately on all Cartoon releases. Hugo Maasikas and Joosep Järvesaar continue Cartoon as a duo.

Cartoon participated alongside Ewert Sundja in Eesti Laul 2024, the Estonian selection for the Eurovision Song Contest 2024, with the song "Oblivion". They did not qualify from the semi-final. Cartoon released the song through Liquicity. In 2025, Cartoon released their album called Cartoon & friends on NoCopyrightSounds, with artists such as Leowi, Immy Odon, and NCT.

== Discography ==
=== Studio Albums ===
Title	Details
Cartoon & Friends	Released: 25 July 2025; Label: NoCopyrightSounds; Formats: Digital download, streaming

=== Extended plays ===
Title	Details
Made Me Feel / One Day	Released: 18 May 2015; Label: Liquicity Records; Formats: Digital download, streaming
Mas Y Mas / On & On	Released: 11 September 2020; Label: NoCopyrightSounds; Formats: Digital download, streaming

=== Singles ===
Title	Year	Peak chart positions	Certifications	Album
Title	Year	EST Airplay	Certifications	Album
"Made Me Feel" (featuring Kristel Aaslaid)	2015	—		Made Me Feel / One Day
"One Day" (featuring Karl-Kristjann Kingi)	2015	—		Made Me Feel / One Day
"Why We Lose" (featuring Coleman Trapp)	2015	—		Non-album single
"On & On" (featuring Daniel Levi Viinalass)	2015	1	RIAA: Gold; BPI: Silver	NCS: The Best of 2015
"Whatever I do" (featuring Kóstja)	2015	9		Non-album single
"Immortality" (featuring Kristel Aaslaid)	2015	4		Non-album single
"Feeling (Piece Of You)"	2016	—		Non-album single
"Here" (featuring Würffel)	2016	1		Non-album single
"C U Again" (featuring Mikk Mäe)	2016	—		NCS: The Best of 2016
"I Remember U" (featuring Jüri Pootsmann)	2016	1		NCS: The Best of 2016
"Your Stories" (featuring Koit Toome)	2017	—		NCS: Colors
"Howling" (featuring Asena)	2020	—		Non-album single
"Don't Be A Stranger" (featuring Jason Diaz)	2020	—		Non-album single
"Fade Away" (featuring Ewert and the Two Dragons)	2020	—		Non-album single
"Biology" (featuring nublu and gameboy tetris)	2021	—		Non-album single
"Omen" (featuring Asena)	2021	—		Non-album single
"Whatever" (featuring Andromedik and Jüri Pootsmann)	2022	—		Non-album single
"Piranha" (featuring pluuto)	2022	—		Non-album single
"No Halo" (featuring Asena)	2022	—		Non-album single
"I'm Not Alright" (featuring Bedwetters)	2022	—		Non-album single
"Flashback" (featuring Elina Born)	2023	—		Non-album single
"Sideways" (with TWISTED, Zaug and SlidV)	2023	—		Non-album single
"Oblivion" (featuring Ewert Sundja)	2024	—		Non-album single
"On The Break Of Dawn" (with Kristjan Järvi, Kitty Florentine and Nordic Pulse)	2025	—		Cartoon & Friends
"Bounce On Da Riddim" (with NCT, Southby and Emily J)	2025	—		Cartoon & Friends
"Made For The Game" (with Jessee, Kazhi and AC13)	2025	—		Cartoon & Friends
"Around Us" (featuring NCT, Vallo Kikas, Carlos Ukareda and Pasha)	2025	—		Cartoon & Friends
"Wait A While" (featuring LEOWI, m els and Pasha)	2025	—		Cartoon & Friends
"Euphoria" (with Vallo Kikas, Blooom and KAZHI)	2025	—		Cartoon & Friends
"All We've Ever Known" (with Immy Odon and Fred V)	2025	—		Non-album single
"Like A Melody" (with Jozels and Kazhi)	2026	—		NCS vs Monstercat: 15 Year Anniversary
