= I Remember U =

2016 song by Cartoon featuring Jüri Pootsmann

Single by Cartoon and Jéja featuring Jüri Pootsmann
- Released: 11 March 2016
- Recorded: 2015
- Genre: Dance; drum and bass; funk
- Length: 3:31
- Label: NoCopyrightSounds
- Lyricists: Daniel Levi Viinalass, Kristel Aaslaid
- Producers: Hugo Martin Maasikas, Joosep Järvesaar, Ago Teppand

Cartoon singles chronology
"C U Again" (2016)	"I Remember U" (2016)	"Your Stories" (2017)

Jüri Pootsmann singles chronology
"Play" (2016)	"I Remember U" (2016)	"Nii või naa" (2016)

Music video
- "I Remember U" on YouTube

"I Remember U" is a song performed by Estonian DJ Duo Cartoon alongside producer and former member of the band Jéja, featuring vocals from Estonian singer Jüri Pootsmann. The song was released as a digital download on March 11, 2016 through NoCopyrightSounds. The song peaked to number 1 on the Estonian Airplay Chart. The song is now used as the ADVChina YouTube channel theme tune.

== Track listing ==
Digital download
No.	Title	Length
1.	"I Remember U" (feat. Jüri Pootsmann)	3:35
2.	"I Remember U" (feat. Jüri Pootsmann (Extended Mix))	4:19
3.	"I Remember U" (feat. Jüri Pootsmann (Ownglow Remix))	4:06
4.	"I Remember U" (feat. Juri Pootsmann (Xilent Remix))	3:41

== Chart performance ==
Chart (2016)	Peak position
Estonia (Raadio Uuno)	1

== Release history ==
Region	Date	Format	Label
Worldwide	11 March 2016	Digital download	NoCopyrightSounds
