= Jüri Pootsmann =

Estonian singer

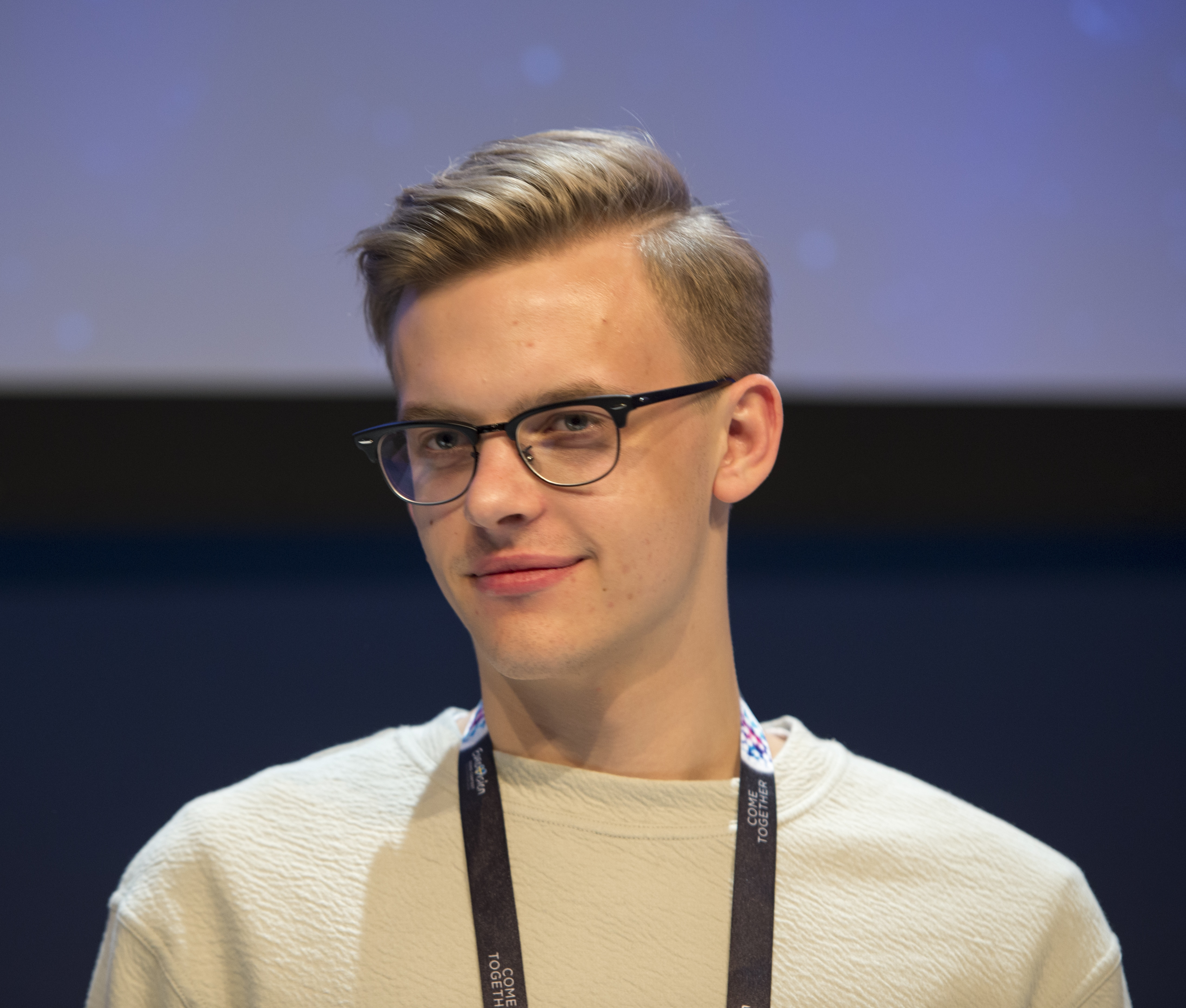
- Pootsmann in 2016

Background information
- Born: 1 July 1994 (age 32); Raikküla, Estonia
- Occupation: Singer
- Years active: 2013–present
- Label: Universal

Jüri Pootsmann (born 1 July 1994), is an Estonian singer. He won the sixth season of Eesti otsib superstaari, and represented Estonia in the Eurovision Song Contest 2016 with the song "Play". He is signed to Universal Music Baltics.

== Career ==
=== 2015: Eesti otsib superstaari ===
In February 2015, Pootsmann took part in the sixth season of Eesti otsib superstaari, an Estonian version of Pop Idol airing on TV3. He won the show on 31 May 2015 when his debut single "Torm" was released. It peaked at number seven in the Estonian Airplay Chart. On 15 November 2015 he released the single "Aga Siis", peaking at number one in the Estonian Airplay Chart. On 20 November 2015, he released his debut self-titled extended play.

=== Eurovision Song Contest 2016 ===
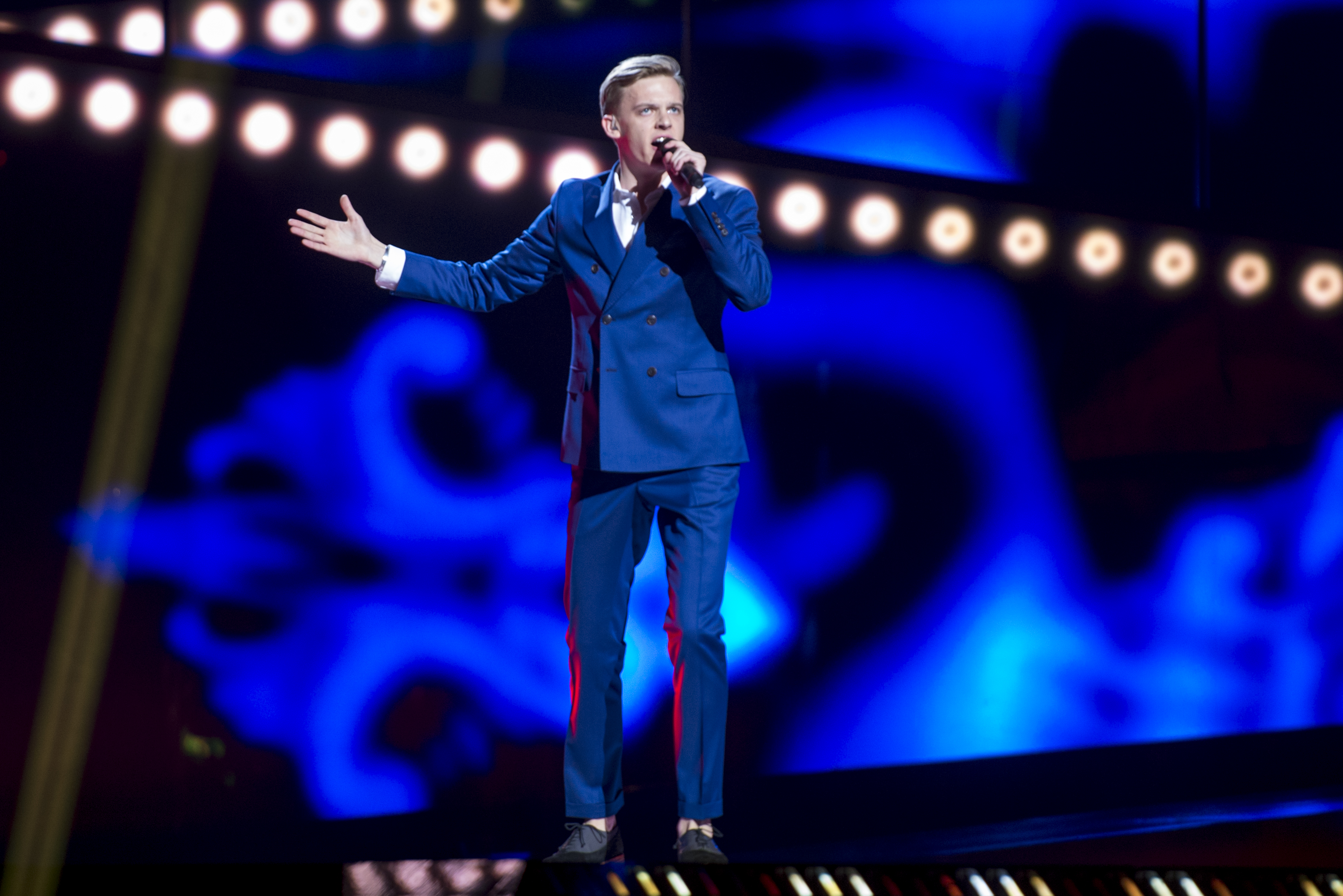
Pootsmann rehearsing for the Eurovision Song Contest in Stockholm (2016)

In 2016, Pootsmann was announced as one of the candidates in the Estonian national selection, Eesti Laul 2016, for the Eurovision Song Contest 2016. On 20 February 2016 Pootsmann performed his song "Play" during the second semi-final of the selection at the Estonian Television studios in Tallinn, and he progressed to the final. The final took place on 5 March 2016 at the Saku Suurhall in Tallinn, hosted by Ott Sepp and Märt Avandi. He reached the Super Final and won the national selection with 32,394 televotes.

During the Eurovision Song Contest, Estonia was drawn into the first semi-final. Pootsmann placed last (18th), Estonia's worst result to date at the contest, and failed to qualify to the final.

=== Eesti Laul 2021 ===
In 2021, Pootsmann attempted to represent Estonia in the Eurovision Song Contest 2021 with his song "Magus Melanhoolia", placing third in the Superfinal at Eesti Laul, Estonia's national selection final.

=== Appearances ===
On 11 March 2016, Pootsmann was featured in the single, "I Remember U," produced by Cartoon. The single peaked at number one in the Estonian Airplay Chart.

== Personal life ==
Pootsmann spent a year on a school exchange in Denmark and is fluent in Danish.

== Discography ==
=== Albums ===
| Title | Details |
|---|---|
| Täna | Released: 18 November 2016; Label: Universal Music Group; Format: Digital download |
| Suveööde unetus | Released: 18 November 2022; Label: Universal Music Estonia; Format: Digital download |

=== Extended plays ===
| Title | Details |
|---|---|
| Jüri Pootsmann | Released: 20 November 2015; Label: Universal Music Group; Format: Digital download, CD |

=== Singles ===
==== As lead artist ====
| Title | Year | Peak chart positions | Album |
| Title | Year | EST Airplay | Album |
|---|---|---|---|
| "Torm" | 2015 | 7 | Jüri Pootsmann |
| "Aga siis" | 2015 | 1 | Jüri Pootsmann |
| "Play" | 2016 | 3 | Non-album single |
| "Nii või naa" | 2016 | 2 | Täna |
| "Ootan Und" | 2016 | — | Täna |
| "Täna" | 2016 | — | Täna |
| "Silmades" | 2017 | — | Täna |
| "Liiga Kiire" | 2017 | — | Täna |
| "Vihmapiisad Päikest Täis" | 2018 | — | Non-album singles |
| "Üksinda koos" | 2019 | 19 | Non-album singles |
| "Magus melanhoolia" | 2020 | — | Suveööde unetus |
| "Ümber sõrme" | 2021 | — | Suveööde unetus |
| "Jäljed jätsid tuulde" | 2022 | — | Suveööde unetus |
| "Vaata mind" | 2022 | — | Suveööde unetus |
| "Suveööde unetus" | 2022 | — | Suveööde unetus |

==== As featured artist ====
| Title | Year | Peak chart positions | Album |
| Title | Year | EST Airplay | Album |
|---|---|---|---|
| "I Remember U" (Cartoon featuring Jüri Pootsmann) | 2016 | 1 | Non-album single |
| "Jagatud saladus" (Elina Born & Jüri Pootsmann) | 2018 | 25 | Non-album single |
| "Whatever" (Cartoon & Andromedik featuring Jüri Pootsmann) | 2022 | - | Non-album single |

Awards and achievements
| Preceded by Elina Born & Stig Rästa with "Goodbye to Yesterday" | Estonia in the Eurovision Song Contest; 2016 | Succeeded by Koit Toome & Laura with "Verona" |
