= Aga siis =

2015 song by Jüri Pootsman

Single by Jüri Pootsmann

from the album Jüri Pootsmann
- Released: 13 November 2015
- Recorded: 2014
- Genre: Pop
- Length: 3:31
- Label: Universal Music Group
- Songwriter: Sten Sheripov
- Producer: Sten Sheripov

Jüri Pootsmann singles chronology
"Torm" (2015)	"Aga siis" (2015)	"Play" (2016)

"Aga siis" (English: "But Then") is a song performed by Estonian singer Jüri Pootsmann. The song was released as a digital download on 13 November 2015 through Universal Music Group as the second single from his self-titled extended play. The song peaked at number 1 on the Estonian Airplay Chart.

== Track listing ==
Digital download
No.	Title	Length
1.	"Aga siis"	3:31

== Chart performance ==
Chart (2015)	Peak position
Estonia (Raadio Uuno)	1

== Release history ==
Region	Date	Format	Label
Estonia	13 November 2015	Digital download	Universal Music Group
