= Torm (Jüri Pootsmann song) =

2015 song by Jüri Pootsmann

Single by Jüri Pootsmann

from the album Jüri Pootsmann
- Released: 31 May 2015
- Recorded: 2014
- Genre: Pop
- Length: 3:37
- Label: Universal Music Group
- Songwriters: Kim Wennerström, Maian Kärmas
- Producer: Kim Wennerström

Jüri Pootsmann singles chronology
"Torm" (2015)	"Aga siis" (2015)

"Torm" (English: Storm) is a song performed by Estonian singer Jüri Pootsmann. The song was released as a digital download on 31 May 2015 through Universal Music Group as the lead single from his self-titled extended play. The song peaked at number 7 on the Estonian Airplay Chart.

== Track listing ==
Digital download
No.	Title	Length
1.	"Torm"	3:37

== Chart performance ==
Chart (2015)	Peak position
Estonia (Raadio Uuno)	7

== Release history ==
Region	Date	Format	Label
Estonia	7 March 2014	Digital download	Universal Music Group
