= Stig Rästa =

Estonian singer and songwriter

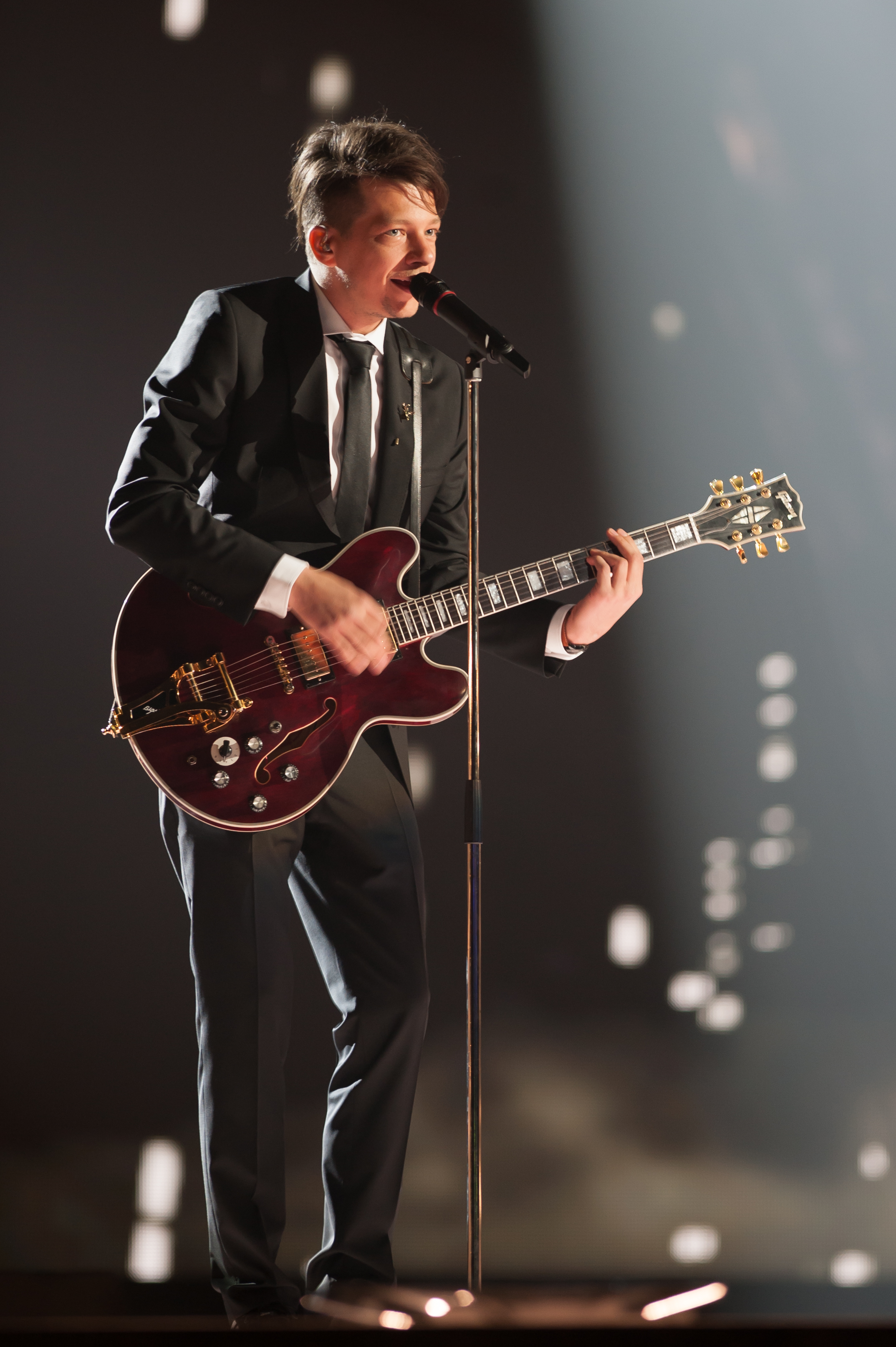
- Rästa in 2015

Background information
- Born: 24 February 1980 (age 46); Tallinn, then under occupation of Estonian SSR, Soviet Union
- Genre: Alternative
- Occupations: Singer; songwriter; politician
- Instruments: vocal; guitar
- Years active: 2002–present

Member of the Riigikogu
- Incumbent
- Assumed office 25 March 2025

Personal details
- Party: Eesti 200

Raul-Stig Rästa (born 24 February 1980) is an Estonian politician, singer and songwriter who, along with singer Elina Born, represented Estonia in the Eurovision Song Contest 2015 with the song "Goodbye to Yesterday". Since 2025, Rästa has been a member of the 15th Riigikogu.

== Career ==
Between 2002 and 2006 he formed a band Slobodan River with Ithaka Maria and Tomi Rahula. Since 2006 he has played in Traffic and also in Outloudz since 2010. In 2011 he was a contestant in the fifth season of Let's Dance. He was partnered with Karina Vesman and they finished in fourth place. In 2012, Stig played Moritz in the Estonian original production of the musical Spring Awakening.

He is also part of electronic music duo Kisma, alongside Vallo Kikas.

=== Eurovision Song Contest ===
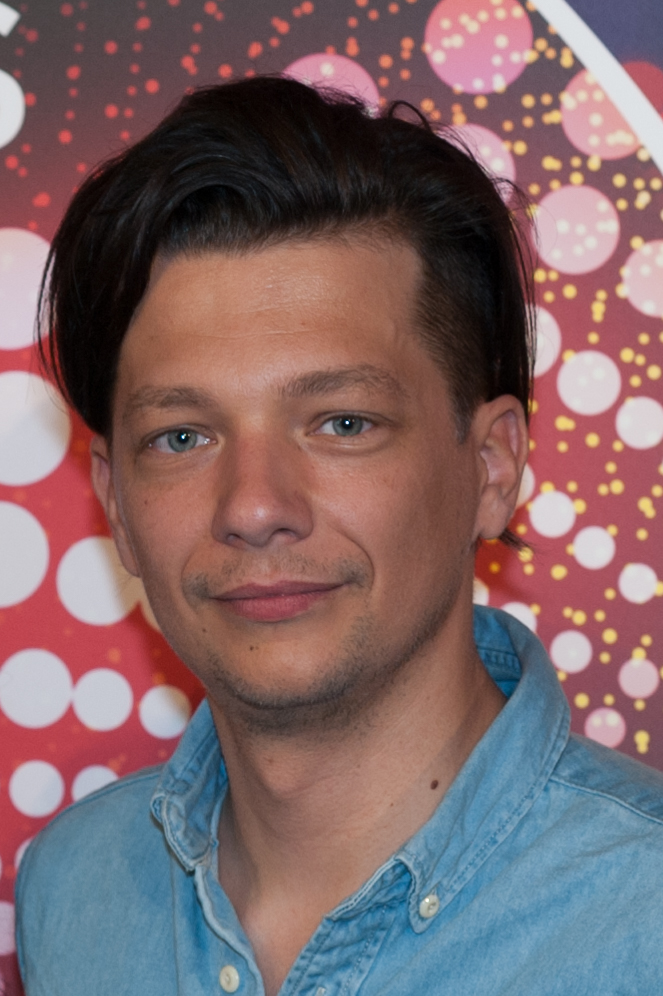
Rästa in 2015

Rästa tried several times to represent Estonia at the Eurovision Song Contest. He competed with Slobodan River in Eurolaul 2003 and 2004, then with Traffic in Eurolaul 2008 and Eesti Laul 2009, 2012, 2014, 2020, and he also finished runner up with Outloudz in Eesti Laul 2011.

Rästa entered Eesti Laul 2015 with the song "Goodbye to Yesterday", a duet with Elina Born. The song went on to win its semi final and top both the jury and the televote scores, before doing the same in the final and winning in a landslide in the superfinal, with 79% of the popular vote. In the contest itself, the entry qualified for the grand final, where it placed 7th with 106 points.

He co-wrote the song "Play" by Jüri Pootsmann, which represented Estonia at the Eurovision Song Contest 2016, coming last in its semi and failing to qualify.

Rästa returned for the second time as a composer for Elina Born in Eesti Laul 2017, she finished 10th in the final with the song "In or Out". He already wrote her song for her first Eesti Laul in 2013, "Enough" came 8th in the final.

He competed by himself in Eesti Laul 2018 with the song "Home", which went on to place second in the contest.

He co-wrote the song "Storm" by Victor Crone, which represented Estonia at the Eurovision Song Contest 2019, placing 20th in the final with 76 points.

He participated in Eesti Laul 2022 with the song "Interstellar", placing 9th in the final.

== Personal life ==
Rästa participated in the 2023 Estonian parliamentary election as a candidate for Estonia 200, but failed to get elected as a member of Parliament for electoral district no. 4 (Harju and Rapla counties, excluding Tallinn). On 26 March 2025, he became a member of the Riigikogu as a substitute for Hendrik Johannes Terras, who had left the Riigikogu.

== Discography ==
=== Singles ===
Title	Year	Peak chart positions								Album
Title	Year	EST	AUT	GER	BEL (FL)	BEL (WA)	NL	SWE	SWI	Album
"Goodbye to Yesterday" (with Elina Born)	2015	1	8	71	32	42	73	56	68	Non-album singles
"Home"	2018	24	—	—	—	—	—	—	—	Non-album singles
"Interstellar"	2021	—	—	—	—	—	—	—	—	Non-album singles
"—" denotes a single that did not chart or was not released in that territory.

Awards and achievements
Preceded by Tanja Mihhailova with "Amazing"	Estonia in the Eurovision Song Contest (with Elina Born); 2015	Succeeded by Jüri Pootsmann with "Play"
