= Here (Cartoon & Jéja song) =

2016 song by Cartoon and Jéja featuring Würffel

Single by Cartoon and Jéja featuring Würffel
- Released: 20 May 2016
- Recorded: 2015
- Genre: Dance; drum and bass
- Length: 3:36
- Label: Liquicity Records
- Songwriter(s): Rosanna Lints; Taavi Paomets; Ago Teppand; Hugo Martin Maasikas; Joosep Järvesaar
- Producer(s): Hugo Martin Maasikas, Joosep Järvesaar, Ago Teppand

Cartoon singles chronology
"Feeling (Piece Of You)" (2016)	"Here" (2016)	"C U Again" (2016)

"Here" is a song performed by Estonian DJ Duo Cartoon alongside producer and former member of the band Jéja, featuring Estonian electro-pop group Würffel. The song was released as a digital download on May 20, 2016, through Liquicity Records. The song peaked to number 1 on the Estonian Airplay Chart.

== Track listing ==
Digital download
No.	Title	Length
1.	"Here" (feat. Würffel)	3:36
2.	"Feeling (Piece Of You)"	3:38
Total length:		7:14

== Chart performance ==
Chart (2016)	Peak position
Estonia (Raadio Uuno)	1

== Release history ==
Region	Date	Format	Label
Worldwide	20 May 2016	Digital download	Liquicity Records
