= Nii või naa =

2016 song by Jüri Pootsmann

Single by Jüri Pootsmann

from the album Täna
- Released: 3 June 2016
- Recorded: 2015
- Genre: Pop
- Length: 3:33
- Label: Universal Music Group
- Songwriter: Sten Sheripov
- Producer: Sten Sheripov

Jüri Pootsmann singles chronology
"I Remember U" (2016)	"Nii või naa" (2016)	"Ootan Und" (2016)

"Nii või naa" (English: One Way or Another) is a song performed by Estonian singer Jüri Pootsmann. The song was released as a digital download on 3 June 2016 through Universal Music Group. The song peaked at number 2 on the Estonian Airplay Chart.

== Track listing ==
Digital download
No.	Title	Length
1.	"Nii või naa"	3:33

== Chart performance ==
Chart (2016)	Peak position
Estonia (Raadio Uuno)	2

== Release history ==
Region	Date	Format	Label
Estonia	3 June 2016	Digital download	Universal Music Group
