= On and On =

On and On or On & On may refer to:

== Albums ==
- On and On (Jack Johnson album), 2003
- On & On (Jennifer Holliday album), 1995
- On and On (All-4-One album), 1999
- On and On, by Eagle & Hawk
- On and On (The Fat Boys album), 1989

== Songs ==
- "On and On" (Gladys Knight & the Pips song), 1974
- "On and On" (Stephen Bishop song), 1977
- "On & On" (Jesse Saunders song), 1984
- "On & On" (Erykah Badu song), 1997
- "On and On" (Agnes song), 2008
- "On and On" (VIXX song), 2013
- "On & On" (Illy song), 2013
- "On & On" (Cartoon song), 2015
- "On & On" (Piri & Tommy song), 2022
- "On & On" (Armin van Buuren and Punctual song), 2023
- "On and On" (Tyla song), 2023
- "On and On", by Flo Rida from Only One Flo (Part 1)
- "On and On", by The Answer from Everyday Demons
- "On and On", by Boy Kill Boy from Civilian
- "On and On", by Chasen from That Was Then, This Is Now
- "On and On", by Curtis Harding from Face Your Fear
- "On and On", by Do from the self-titled album
- "On and On", by Estelle from The 18th Day
- "On and On", by Hikaru Utada from This Is the One
- "On and On", by Jay Sean from Me Against Myself
- "On and On", by The Longpigs from The Sun Is Often Out
- "On and On", by Michael Schenker Group from MSG
- "On and On", by Raven from Stay Hard
- "On and On", by Steriogram from Schmack!
- "On and On", by Shyheim from AKA the Rugged Child
- "On and On (Lodestar)", a 1995 song by Crash Vegas
- "On and On", a 2002 song by 20syl from the mixtape 1son2rue by Cut Killer
- "On and On", a song by Mustard Plug from their 2007 album In Black and White
- "On & On", by Eamon from I Don't Want You Back
- "On & On", by Joey Badass from B4.Da.$$
- "On & On", by Mike Stud featuring Conrad Sewell from Closer
- "On & On", by Missy Elliott from The Cookbook
- "On & On", a 2013 song by Boyfriend from the EP Witch
- "On & On", by Inna from Hot (2009)
- "On & On" by Flo from Access All Areas (2025)

== Television ==
- "On and On" (Luke Cage), an episode of Luke Cage

== See also ==
- "On and On and On", a 1980 song by ABBA
- "And On and On", a song by Janet Jackson from Any Time, Any Place
- "On & On & On", a song by Maggie Rogers from Don't Forget Me
- "On and On and On", a song by Catch 22 and Streetlight Manifesto
