= Goodbye to Yesterday =

Goodbye to Yesterday may refer to:

- "Goodbye to Yesterday" (No Angels song), 2007
- "Goodbye to Yesterday" (Elina Born & Stig Rästa song), 2015
