= Tanja Mihhailova-Saar =

Estonian singer

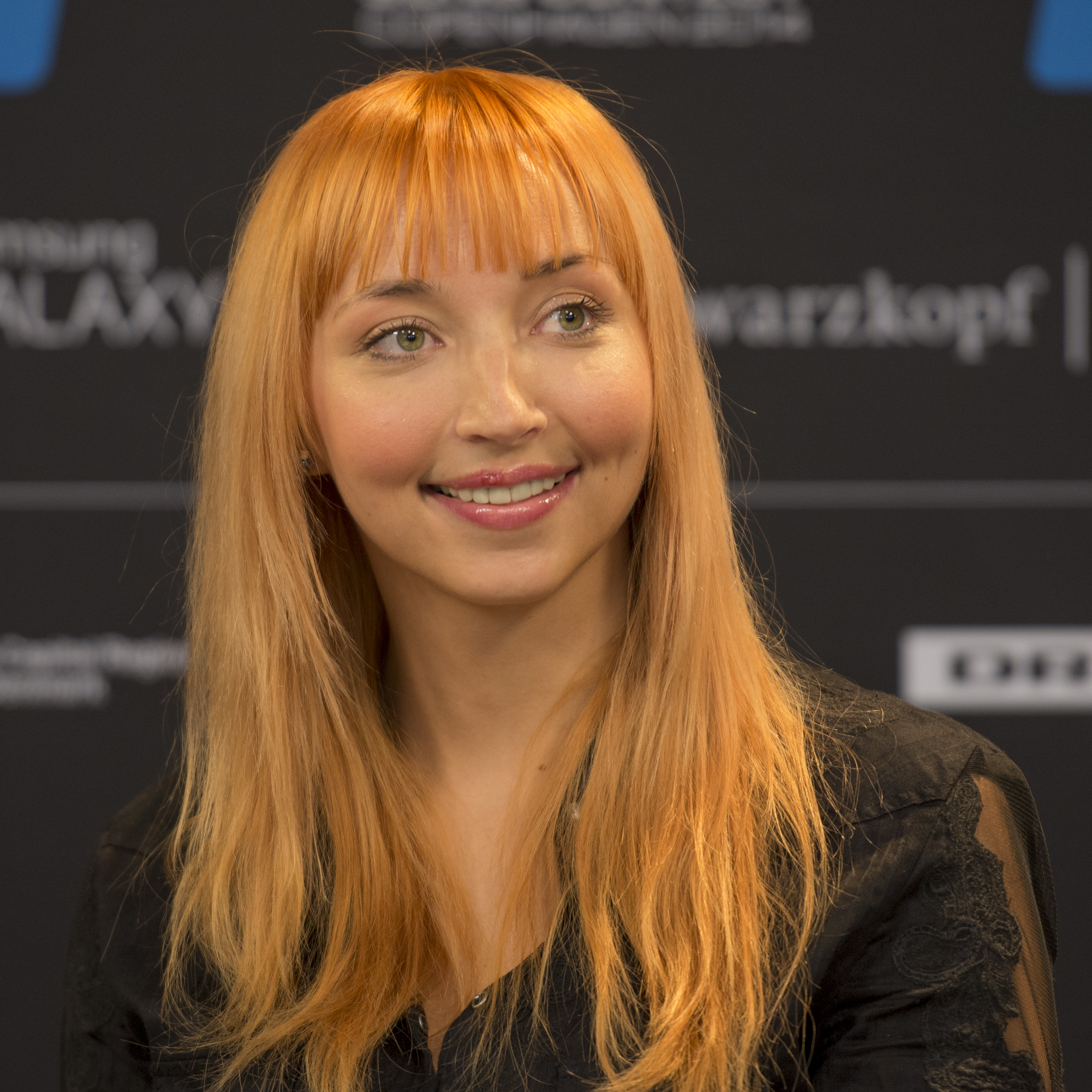
- Mihhailova at the Eurovision Song Contest 2014

Background information
- Born: Tatjana Mihhailova; 19 June 1983 (age 43); Kaliningrad, Russian SFSR, USSR
- Origin: Kohtla-Järve, Estonia
- Genres: Pop
- Years active: 2001–present
- Website: tanjamusic.com

Tatjana Mihhailova-Saar (Russian: Татьяна Михайлова, born 19 June 1983), better known as Tanja or Tanja Mihhailova is a Russian-Estonian pop singer and actress. She was born in Kaliningrad, Russia, and has lived in Estonia from a very young age. Tanja has been a member of several bands in her professional career and has performed in several stage musicals. She represented Estonia in the Eurovision Song Contest 2014 with the song "Amazing" and finished in 12th place in the semi-final, failing to qualify.

== Early life ==
Mihhailova-Saar was born in Kaliningrad in Russia, but relocated with her family to Estonia when she was two months old. She was raised in the Estonian city of Kohtla-Järve in the Russian-Estonian community.

== Musical career ==
Tanja started singing at a very young age, participating in numerous contests and song festivals in Estonia, Russia and Ukraine. In 1998 she won the contest "Utrennaja zvezda" in Jurmala, Latvia and in 2002 she took part of "Fizz superstar 2002" Baltic singing competition.

=== Nightlight Duo ===
Nightlight Duo
- Origin: Estonia
- Genres: Techno
- Years active: 2001–2004
- Past members: Ly Lumiste; Tanja Mihhailova

With the Estonian producer Sven Lõhmus and together with Estonian singer Ly Lumiste, Tanja formed the techno duo band Nightlight Duo in 2001. The band released two albums, Jäljed liival ("Traces in the sand"), and Miks ma ei suuda su maailma muuta ("Why can't I change your world"). The latter album won the award for the best album of the year, "Aasta uustulnuk 2002".

Nightlight Duo competed twice in Eurolaul, Estonia's selection for the Eurovision Song Contest. In 2002, their song Another Country Song got second place in Eurolaul and a year later their song I can b the 1 came fourth. Both songs were produced and written by Sven Lõhmus.

The band disbanded in 2004 due Lumiste's pregnancy and Tanja continued with her musical career.

=== Jz Belle ===
With the producer and composer Timo Vendt, Tanja created the band Jz Belle in 2004. The first album (with covered songs only) "Jz Belle" was released in 2004. The second album "Teemant" was released in 2006 and three radio singles were released from this one.

=== Other bands and shows ===
Finished with the Jz Belle project, Tanja also starred in the band Sunday Mood with Timo Vendt and the Canadian guitarist Alex Pier Federici, with whom they released an album in English called "Something more" in 2009, with great success in the Baltic countries.

In this period Tanja performed in the show "Queen – The doors of Time" in Theatre Vanemuine in Tartu, together with Broadway artist Tony Vincent and Estonian singer Rolf Roosalu.

She had also participated in a few Estonian television contests (TV3), such as "Laulud tähtedega" (Estonian version of Just the Two of Us) in 2010/11, obtaining second place, behind Artur Talvik and Lenna Kuurmaa; and in "Laulupealinn" in November 2011, obtaining second place too.

In 2013, Tanja came third in the TV show "Su nägu kõlab tuttavalt" (Your Face Sounds Familiar).

=== Gemini ===
In 2012, she released her 6th solo album, Gemini. Three singles were released from the album: "Supernatural", "Sind ootan ikka veel" (feat. Mikk Saar) and "All In My Head".

=== Eurovision Song Contest 2014 ===
Tanja competed in the Estonian national final, Eesti Laul 2014, for the chance to compete in the Eurovision Song Contest 2014 in Copenhagen, Denmark. She won the national final by her song, "Amazing" with 53 percent of the votes. On 15 March, the song was officially released (together with the stage-act). She failed to qualify for the final, finishing 12th in the first semi final with 36 points.

=== After Eurovision ===
Tanja shared stage with Andrea Bocelli at his Tallinn concert on 28 June 2014. Tanja will also perform with her biggest concert of her career called "Amazing Lie" at the festival Õllesummer in July 2014 in Tallinn. In June Tanja went to Crete to shoot her new music video for her summer single Forevermore. She is the backup juror for Estonian jury panel in the Eurovision Song Contest 2015 in Vienna, Austria, and she was the Estonian spokesperson during the voting.

Tanja participated in Eesti Laul 2019 alongside The Swingers and Birgit with the song 'High Heels In The Neighbourhood'. They placed 7th in the final. She later participated in Eesti Laul 2021 with her song "Best Night Ever". She failed to qualify from the second semi final. She was part of Eesti Laul 2022 as a host, jury member and interval performer, as well as having co-written the song "Hea päev" for the group Little Mess.

== Discography ==
=== Albums ===
- Jz Belle (2004)
- Teemant (2006)
- Gemini (2012)
- Amazing EP (2014)
- Elan päev korraga (2015)

=== Singles ===
- "Kaasa mind vii" (2006)
- "Sind nii kaua pole olnud siin" (2007)
- "Sind ikka ootan" (2007)
- "Supernatural" (2012)
- "Sind ootan ikka veel" (feat. Mikk Saar) (2013)
- "All in My Head" (2013)
- "Amazing" (2014)
- "Forevermore" (2014)
- "Külmunud maa" (2014)
- "Elan päev korraga" (2015)
- "Hääletu peal" (2015)

Awards and achievements
Preceded by Birgit Õigemeel with "Et uus saaks alguse"	Estonia in the Eurovision Song Contest; 2014	Succeeded by Elina Born & Stig Rästa with "Goodbye to Yesterday"
