= Rõivas =

Surname list

Rõivas is an Estonian surname. Notable people with the surname include:

- Luisa Rõivas (born 1987), Estonian singer and politician
- Taavi Rõivas (born 1979), Estonian politician
