= Matthew Tye =

American YouTuber (born 1986)

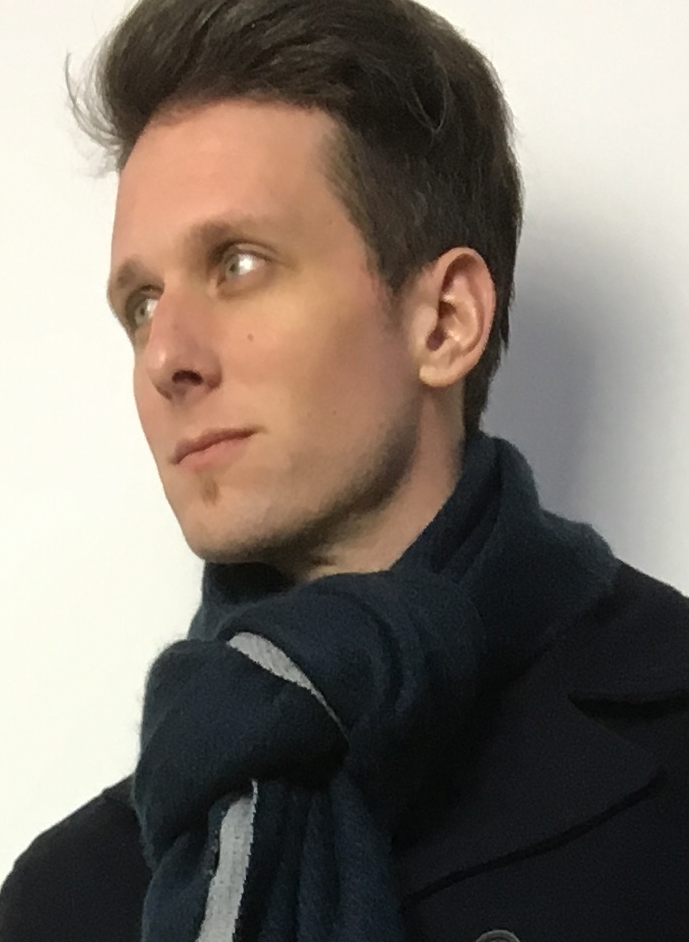
- Tye in 2015
- Born: December 27, 1986 (age 39); Binghamton, New York, U.S.
- Other names: Laowhy86; C-Milk
- Spouse: Vivienne Wei
- Children: 2

YouTube information
- Channel: laowhy86
- Years active: 2012–present
- Genres: Travel vlogger; political commentator about China
- Subscribers: 1.01 million
- Views: 184.2 million
- Last updated: April 23, 2026

Matthew Tye (born December 27, 1986), also known as Laowhy86 or C-Milk, is an American YouTuber, political commentator, and travel vlogger. He is a commentator about political and social issues in China. According to the Associated Press, Tye is a "vocal critic" of the Chinese government.

Tye grew up in upstate New York and graduated from university in 2008. He received an offer to teach English as a second language in a school in Huizhou in the Chinese province of Guangdong, and promptly moved to China. Tye created a YouTube account in 2012. While working as an English teacher, he made videos about life in China and co-founded a motorcycle building shop (with Winston Sterzel) called Churchill Motorcycles, around 2015. With Sterzel, Tye explored northern and southern China on motorcycle and created two documentaries, Conquering Southern China and Conquering Northern China. While filming the second documentary, they were interrogated for a few hours by the Special Police Unit of the Chinese People's Armed Police Force in Inner Mongolia before being released. The police asked Tye and Sterzel whether they were journalists and had created illegal videos, both of which they denied.

In early 2018, the public security bureau in Huizhou showed Tye's photograph in establishments frequented by foreigners as part of an investigation into his creation of an aerial video that they alleged to have shown a Huizhou military base. He decided to immediately leave China where he had lived for 10 years. Tye traveled to Hong Kong and then to the United States, where he settled down with his family in Los Angeles. His YouTube channel began discussing political and social topics related to China, such as human rights in China, attempts by the government to pay social media influencers to post propaganda videos, and the COVID-19 lab leak theory.

== Early and personal life ==
Matthew Tye was born on December 27, 1986, in Binghamton, New York. He graduated from Maine-Endwell High School in Endwell, New York, on June 25, 2005. After graduating from university in 2008, he wanted to explore the world. Upon learning that he could teach English as a second language, he sent out job applications on the Internet. Tye immediately booked a flight to China after being offered a job to teach English in Huizhou, Guangdong. After spending a year in China, he lived in Taiwan for one and a half years, between 2010 and 2011, before moving back to China for 10 years. In China, he spent several years in Inner Mongolia before returning to Guangdong. During his time in Taiwan, he was able to pay off his student loans in a year with the low cost of living and his income being between five and seven times more than what he would have earned in China. In Huizhou, Tye met a Chinese woman, Vivienne Wei, who became his wife. They started a family in Huizhou and owned an apartment. The couple has two daughters who seldom are in the YouTube videos on Tye's channel.

== Career ==
=== Start of YouTube channel ===
Before becoming a YouTuber, Tye made rap music and performed at clubs in China including in Guangdong. After this, Tye started a YouTube channel named "Laowhy86", on April 20, 2012. The name "Laowhy" is a homophone for the Chinese term "Laowai", which means "foreigner". To foreigners, he was known as "C-milk". At the beginning of his YouTube career, he produced positive content about the country, comparing American and Chinese cultures and covering what it was like to live in, and travel through China. Calling his viewers "lao winners", he made videos with titles like "What NOT to do in China: Top 5 things" and "Chinese Girl Tries American Chinese Food", his channel's most popular video in 2017. He answered questions such as his marriage with a woman from a different culture, his daughter, and obesity in China. Tye said the content of the videos grew less positive in 2016 with the rise in Chinese nationalism, spearheaded by Xi Jinping's policies. He had experiences where he was dining out and was shouted or scowled at because he had a Chinese wife. In 2017, Tye crossed the 100,000 YouTube subscriber mark. In an interview with That's PRD in 2017, he said he had become a full-time YouTuber and every week was spending 55 to 60 hours making videos. Around 2017, Tye uploaded a video of him talking about "language rapists" while he was strolling around Huizhou. In the video, which went viral, he said, "They see your white face or they see that you're a foreigner and assume they can learn English for free".

=== Motorcycle travel documentaries ===
With business partners Winston Sterzel and Marty Schmidt, Tye established a custom motorcycle shop named Churchill Customs around 2015. Tye worked as the marketing and sales manager for the company.

Tye frequently rode his motorcycle across China, showcasing the material he filmed for his YouTube channel. He made two documentaries with fellow YouTuber Sterzel while they were riding motorcycles to visit different parts of the country. Titled Conquering Southern China and released in August 2016, the first documentary featured Tye and Sterzel's motorcycle trip across 5,000 kilometres (3,100 mi) of Southern China. Filmed over 15 days, it was released in August 2016 in four segments on Vimeo. Conquering Southern China was directed by Ricardo Alfonso, who accompanied them in a car that trailed their motorcycles.

In 2017, they raised money on Kickstarter to film Conquering Northern China, their second documentary. By the end of March 2017, they had raised ¥282,000 (US$41,700) from 1,200 people. While making their second documentary in Inner Mongolia, their friend connected them with a government employee. According to Tye, the employee initially brought them to film nomads in the region but became unhappy with them after reading negative comments on a Chinese website about their YouTube content. Believing that maligning China was their intention, the employee told the people they were going to visit that the people would be mocked. Tye said that was not their intention. Although Tye and Sterzel were able to film the nomads, Tye said a Special Police Unit entered their hotel rooms at night to detain them for questioning for several hours. According to Tye, the police tried to get them to confess to having created illegal videos or to being journalists, which they denied. Inner Mongolia is several thousand miles from Guangdong, where Tye was based. Feeling disquieted that the police from that far away knew personal details about him like his and his wife's place of employment, his wife's name, and where he purchased goods, he said, "This was one of the many situations we had experienced that year and the year before. It made me realize that the bad omen had come and I felt I was no longer welcome in China."

=== Leaving China ===
After he went back to Huizhou, a friend informed him in early 2018, that members of the public security bureau there had shown his photo in bars and establishments frequented by foreigners. Tye determined that he had to exit from China without delay. The first phase of his plan was to travel to Hong Kong and the second phase was to decide what to do next. His aim was not to have the Chinese government bar him from departing. His friend took him to a Shenzhen border crossing, where the border inspector asked him to provide his Chinese name. Tye responded that he had no Chinese name and said in a later interview that he had never previously been asked for his Chinese name. After he finished going through customs, the policewoman mentioned his Chinese name and asked whether he would be returning to China. Thinking that saying "yes" would be the right answer, he responded in the affirmative and was allowed to enter Hong Kong. While Tye was in Hong Kong, his friends told him he was being sought by Huizhou's public security department and transportation department. The government authorities accused Tye of using a drone to create an aerial video that showed a Huizhou military base. Tye stated in an interview that the government had the drone in its registry, Chinese citizens had filmed the area and posted it online, and he would have received a warning if his drone was flying a restricted area.

Under the belief that the Chinese government aimed to take action against him, he decided to move back to the United States. One month later, after his wife's green card was approved, the family left the country in 2019. Tye had lived in China for 10 years. They settled in Los Angeles, and in February he began making YouTube videos in the United States. In July 2020, he uploaded a YouTube video about escaping from China and in one year, it attracted over 10,000 comments and over 1.25 million views. According to the conservative Brazilian newspaper Gazeta do Povo, Tye had interviewed Chinese people without securing a required journalist's license, which was why he had to leave the country.

=== Shift to political and social commentator ===
Once Tye moved to the United States, his YouTube channel moved from covering upbeat subject matter to delving into political and social issues in China. He began strongly condemning the Chinese government. Tye commented about human rights in China, which he previously had been unable to talk about. He discussed how he used to think it was free and pleasant to live in China but changed his mind into thinking the freedoms were superficial after having a deeper understanding of the country. Tye said during a September 2019 video that China was encountering increased crime and state persecution. He stated that government officials snatched the property on which he and Sterzel ran their motorcycle business. On November 18, 2020, Tye uploaded a video that made eight points of rebuttal against a Nathan Rich video that said China's territory included Taiwan.

Tye published a YouTube video on April 1, 2020, regarding the COVID-19 lab leak theory and the Wuhan Institute of Virology (WIV). In the video, he stated that a woman had responded to a WIV job posting shortly prior to the start of the COVID-19 pandemic, called her the likely patient zero, and named her as the student Huang Yanling; Tye said she had vanished. In an op-ed for CNBC, Paul Wolfowitz and Bill Drexel said that Tye had "discerning criticism" of the World Health Organization's actions regarding China. In the same op-ed, Wolfowitz and Drexel claimed that Tye was subjected to an endless stream of cyberharassment from "wumao" and Chinese Communist Party supporters. Branding him as a white supremacist, they were able to cut into his income and viewership by "demonetiz[ing]" his YouTube uploads. Tye's sponsorships, which made up most of his revenue, were severely cut after companies became worried about offending China. In 2022, Tye made videos about how China had backed Russia after its invasion of Ukraine.

In 2021, the company Hong Kong Pear Technology emailed many YouTubers, including Tye and Sterzel, offering to pay them for posting on their accounts an ad for Hainan province, which is frequented by tourists for its beaches. Pretending to be enticed by the company's proposal, they responded and received another proposal to share a propaganda video. The company offered to pay them US$2,000 to share the video. The first COVID-19 case was identified in China. Claiming that COVID-19 came from a white-tailed deer, the disinformation video falsely claimed that the disease did not begin in China. The company ceased communication after Tye and Sterzel requested sources to validate the company's incorrect assertions. The duo cited their interaction with the company as demonstrating China's ability to spread disinformation by paying off influencers.

== Reception ==
The pro-Bolsonaro Brazilian newspaper Gazeta do Povo's Bruan Frascolla said, "If you understand English, I will highly recommend Matthew Tye's channel. By the common news, we end up having a timeless perception of China." The Associated Press called Tye and Sterzel "vocal critics" of the Chinese government. Tye's criticisms have been called by Paul Wolfowitz and Bill Drexel of the American Enterprise Institute "discerning" and have cited his experiences and criticisms in their own critiques of the Chinese Communist Party and the response to COVID-19 by the World Health Organization.
