= Estonia in the Eurovision Song Contest 2015 =

- Eurovision Song Contest 2015
- Participating broadcaster: Eesti Rahvusringhääling (ERR)
- Country: Estonia
- Selection process: Eesti Laul 2015
- Selection date: 21 February 2015

Competing entry
- Song: "Goodbye to Yesterday"
- Artist: Elina Born and Stig Rästa
- Songwriters: Stig Rästa

Placement
- Semi-final result: Qualified (3rd, 105 points)
- Final result: 7th, 106 points

Participation chronology

Estonia was represented at the Eurovision Song Contest 2015 with the song "Goodbye to Yesterday" written by Stig Rästa. The song was performed by Elina Born and Stig Rästa. The Estonian broadcaster Eesti Rahvusringhääling (ERR) organised the national final Eesti Laul 2015 in order to select the Estonian entry for the 2015 contest in Vienna, Austria. The national final consisted of three shows: two semi-finals and a final. Ten songs competed in each semi-final and the top five from each semi-final as determined by a jury panel and public vote qualified to the final. In the final, the winner was selected over two rounds of voting. In the first round, a jury panel and a public vote selected the top three to qualify to the superfinal. In the superfinal, "Goodbye to Yesterday" performed by Elina Born and Stig Rästa was selected as the winner entirely by a public vote.

Estonia was drawn to compete in the first semi-final of the Eurovision Song Contest which took place on 19 May 2015. Performing during the show in position 7, "Goodbye to Yesterday" was announced among the top 10 entries of the first semi-final and therefore qualified to compete in the final on 23 May. It was later revealed that Estonia placed third out of the 16 participating countries in the semi-final with 105 points. In the final, Estonia performed in position 4 and placed seventh out of the 27 participating countries, scoring 106 points.

== Background ==
Prior to the 2015 contest, Estonia had participated in the Eurovision Song Contest twenty times since its first entry in 1994, winning the contest on one occasion in 2001 with the song "Everybody" performed by Tanel Padar, Dave Benton and 2XL. Following the introduction of semi-finals for the 2004, Estonia has, to this point, managed to qualify to the final on four occasions. In 2014, "Amazing" performed by Tanja failed to qualify Estonia to the final where the song placed twelfth in the semi-final.

The Estonian national broadcaster, Eesti Rahvusringhääling (ERR), broadcasts the event within Estonia and organises the selection process for the nation's entry. ERR confirmed Estonia's participation at the 2015 Eurovision Song Contest on 26 May 2014. Since their debut, the Estonian broadcaster has organised national finals that feature a competition among multiple artists and songs in order to select Estonia's entry for the Eurovision Song Contest. The Eesti Laul competition has been organised since 2009 in order to select Estonia's entry and on 17 September 2014, ERR announced the organisation of Eesti Laul 2015 in order to select the nation's 2015 entry.

== Before Eurovision ==
=== Eesti Laul 2015 ===
Eesti Laul 2015 was the seventh edition of the Estonian national selection Eesti Laul, which selected Estonia's entry for the Eurovision Song Contest 2015. The competition consisted of twenty entries competing in two semi-finals on 7 and 14 February 2015 leading to a ten-song final on 21 February 2015. All three shows were broadcast on Eesti Televisioon (ETV) with commentary by Mart Juur and Peeter Oja as well as streamed online at the broadcaster's official website err.ee. The final was also broadcast via radio on Raadio 2 as well as streamed online at the official Eurovision Song Contest website eurovision.tv.

==== Format ====
The format of the competition included two semi-finals on 13 and 20 February 2016 and a final on 5 March 2016. Ten songs competed in each semi-final and the top five from each semi-final qualified to complete the ten song lineup in the final. The results of the semi-finals was determined by the 50/50 combination of votes from a professional jury and public televoting. The winning song in the final was selected over two rounds of voting: the first round results selected the top three songs via the 50/50 combination of jury and public voting, while the second round (superfinal) determined the winner solely by public televoting. In addition to winning the right to represent Estonia at the 2015 Eurovision Song Contest, the winning songwriters were also awarded a monetary prize of €3,000 by the Estonian Authors' Society. The Estonian Performers Association also awarded monetary prizes to the top three entries: the winner and second placed entry each received €1,000 and the third placed entry received €500.

==== Competing entries ====
On 17 September 2014, ERR opened the submission period for artists and composers to submit their entries up until 1 December 2014. All artists and composers were required to have Estonian citizenship or be a permanent resident of Estonia and each artist and songwriter was only able to submit a maximum of three entries. A record 219 submissions were received by the deadline—breaking the previous record of 189, set during the 2014 edition. An 11-member jury panel selected 20 semi-finalists from the submissions and the selected songs were announced during the ETV entertainment program Ringvaade on 4 December 2014. The selection jury consisted of Erik Morna (Raadio 2 head of music), Toomas Puna (Raadio Sky+ program director), Owe Petersell (Raadio Elmar chief editor), Siim Nestor (music critic), Kaupo Karelson (television producer), Valner Valme (music critic), Lenna Kuurmaa (singer), Ago Teppand (musician and producer), Anne Veski (singer), Ingrid Kohtla (Tallinn Music Week organiser) and Mingo Rajandi (musician).

Among the competing artists was previous Eurovision Song Contest entrant Robin Juhkental, who represented Estonia in 2010 as part of the group Malcolm Lincoln together with Manpower 4. Airi Vipulkumar Kansar, Elina Born, Liis Lemsalu, Luisa Värk, Maia Vahtramäe, NimmerSchmidt, Stig Rästa and Wilhelm have all competed in previous editions of Eesti Laul.

Artist	Song	Songwriter(s)
Airi Vipulkumar Kansar	"Saatuse laul"	Urmas Kõiv, Anneli Kõiv
Bluestocking	"Kordumatu"	Maria Soikonen
The Blurry Lane	"Exceptional"	Kristina Bianca Rantala
Daniel Levi	"Burning Lights"	Daniel Levi Viinalass
Demie feat. Janice	"Kuum"	Raimo Ugast, Jaanika Merelaht
Elephants From Neptune	"Unriddle Me"	Jon-Arnold Mikiver, Robert Linna, Rain Joona, Markko Reinberg
Elina Born and Stig Rästa	"Goodbye to Yesterday"	Stig Rästa
Elisa Kolk	"Superlove"	Vahur Valgmaa
Kali Briis Band	"Idiot"	Alan Olonen
Karl-Erik Taukar	"Päev korraga"	Karl-Erik Taukar, Mark-Eric Kammiste, Fred Krieger
Kruuv	"Tiiu talu tütreke"	Allan Kasuk
Liis Lemsalu and Egert Milder	"Hold On"	Liis Lemsalu, Madis Lett, Egert Milder, Henri Kuusk, Rob Montes
Luisa Värk	"Minu päike"	Mikk Tammepõld, Luisa Värk
Maia Vahtramäe	"Üle vesihalli taeva"	Olav Osolin
Mari	"Kolm päeva tagasi"	Mariliis Jõgeva
Miina	"Kohvitassi lugu"	Miina Rikka
NimmerSchmidt	"Kellega ma tutvusin?"	Fredy Schmidt, Andero Nimmer
Robin Juhkental and the Big Bangers	"Troubles"	Robin Juhkental, The Big Bangers
Triin Niitoja and John4	"This Is Our Choice"	Jaanus Saago, Triin Niitoja
Wilhelm	"Light Up Your Mind"	Anett Kulbin, Paul Neitsov, Jorven Viilik

==== Semi-finals ====
The two semi-finals took place on 7 and 14 February 2015, hosted by Helen Sürje and Indrek Vaheoja. The live portion of the shows were held at the ERR studios in Tallinn where the artists awaited the results while their performances, which were filmed earlier at the ERR studios on 30 January and 1 February 2015, were screened. In each semi-final ten songs competed for five spots in the final with the outcome decided upon by the combination of the votes from a jury panel and a public televote which registered 18,507 votes in the first semi-final and 38,094 votes in the second semi-final. The jury panel that voted in the semi-finals consisted of Owe Petersell, Mare Väljataga, Alar Kotkas, Peedu Kass, Erik Morna, Marie Vaigla, Valner Valme, Grete Paia, Koit Toome, Sander Mölder and Anneliis Kits.

Semi-final 1 – 7 February 2015
R/O	Artist	Song	Jury		Televote		Total	Place
R/O	Artist	Song	Votes	Points	Votes	Points	Total	Place
1	Karl-Erik Taukar	"Päev korraga"	59	6	1,522	6	12	6
2	Miina	"Kohvitassi lugu"	44	3	719	1	4	10
3	The Blurry Lane	"Exceptional"	48	4	2,657	9	13	3
4	Liis Lemsalu and Egert Milder	"Hold On"	81	7	1,115	2	9	7
5	Airi Vipulkumar Kansar	"Saatuse laul"	37	2	1,186	3	5	9
6	Maia Vahtramäe	"Üle vesihalli taeva"	53	5	2,444	8	13	4
7	Robin Juhkental and the Big Bangers	"Troubles"	81	8	1,377	5	13	5
8	Elephants From Neptune	"Unriddle Me"	100	10	1,207	4	14	2
9	Elisa Kolk	"Superlove"	82	9	4,263	10	19	1
10	Bluestocking	"Kordumatu"	20	1	2,017	7	8	8

Detailed Jury Votes
R/O	Song	O. Petersell	M. Väljataga	A. Kotkas	P. Kass	E. Morna	M. Vaigla	V. Valme	G. Paia	K. Toome	S. Mölder	A. Kits	Total
1	"Päev korraga"	3	3	7	7	4	6	1	7	9	7	5	59
2	"Kohvitassi lugu"	7	6	1	5	2	5	3	3	3	5	4	44
3	"Exceptional"	4	8	6	4	1	3	4	4	5	3	6	48
4	"Hold On"	10	5	8	9	5	7	5	8	7	10	7	81
5	"Saatuse laul"	2	2	5	3	3	8	6	2	2	2	2	37
6	"Üle vesihalli taeva"	6	4	3	6	7	2	8	6	4	4	3	53
7	"Troubles"	5	10	4	8	6	9	10	5	6	9	9	81
8	"Unriddle Me"	8	7	10	10	10	10	9	10	8	8	10	100
9	"Superlove"	9	9	9	2	9	4	7	9	10	6	8	82
10	"Kordumatu"	1	1	2	1	8	1	2	1	1	1	1	20

Semi-final 2 – 14 February 2015
R/O	Artist	Song	Jury		Televote		Total	Place
R/O	Artist	Song	Votes	Points	Votes	Points	Total	Place
1	Wilhelm	"Light Up Your Mind"	75	8	766	1	9	8
2	Kruuv	"Tiiu talu tütreke"	38	2	1,601	7	9	6
3	Demie feat. Janice	"Kuum"	42	3	851	2	5	10
4	NimmerSchmidt	"Kellega ma tutvusin?"	63	6	980	3	9	7
5	Elina Born and Stig Rästa	"Goodbye to Yesterday"	99	10	23,966	10	20	1
6	Daniel Levi	"Burning Lights"	75	7	3,524	9	16	2
7	Triin Niitoja and John4	"This is Our Choice"	60	5	2,240	8	13	3
8	Kali Briis Band	"Idiot"	76	9	1,174	4	13	4
9	Luisa Värk	"Minu päike"	43	4	1,572	6	10	5
10	Mari	"Kolm päeva tagasi"	34	1	1,420	5	6	9

Detailed Jury Votes
R/O	Song	O. Petersell	M. Väljataga	A. Kotkas	P. Kass	E. Morna	M. Vaigla	V. Valme	G. Paia	K. Toome	S. Mölder	A. Kits	Total
1	"Light Up Your Mind"	8	6	9	8	2	10	2	10	6	6	8	75
2	"Tiiu talu tütreke"	1	2	1	2	1	6	5	5	5	7	3	38
3	"Kuum"	4	3	2	1	10	1	8	1	8	2	2	42
4	"Kellega ma tutvusin?"	2	4	3	7	8	9	6	3	4	8	9	63
5	Goodbye to Yesterday"	10	9	8	10	9	8	9	9	10	10	7	99
6	"Burning Lights"	3	10	10	5	6	7	7	8	9	4	6	75
7	"This is Our Choice"	7	5	7	6	5	4	3	7	7	5	4	60
8	"Idiot"	9	8	4	9	7	5	10	4	1	9	10	76
9	"Minu päike"	6	7	6	3	4	2	1	6	2	1	5	43
10	"Kolm päeva tagasi"	5	1	5	4	3	3	4	2	3	3	1	34

==== Final ====
The final took place on 21 February 2015 at the Nordea Concert Hall in Tallinn, hosted by Marko Reikop and Henrik Kalmet. The five entries that qualified from each of the two preceding semi-finals, all together ten songs, competed during the show. The winner was selected over two rounds of voting. In the first round, a jury (50%) and public televote (50%) determined the top three entries to proceed to the superfinal. The public vote in the first round registered 76,087 votes. In the superfinal, "Goodbye to Yesterday" performed by Elina Born and Stig Rästa was selected as the winner entirely by a public televote. The public televote in the superfinal registered 90,417 votes. In addition to the performances of the competing entries, rapper Suur Papa, the band Junk Riot and the Tartu Rock and Pop Institute performed as the interval acts. The jury panel that voted in the first round of the final consisted of Genka (musician), Eda-Ines Etti (singer), Ingrid Kohtla (Tallinn Music Week organiser), Kristjan Hirmo (DJ), Els Himma (singer), Priit Hõbemägi (culture critic), Koit Raudsepp (Raadio 2 presenter), Iiris Vesik (singer), Reigo Ahven (drummer), Kristjan Randalu (pianist and composer) and Tanja (musician and choreographer).

Final – 21 February 2015
R/O	Artist	Song	Jury		Televote		Total	Place
R/O	Artist	Song	Votes	Points	Votes	Points	Total	Place
1	Luisa Värk	"Minu päike"	34	2	1,499	1	3	10
2	Maia Vahtramäe	"Üle vesihalli taeva"	48	3	1,699	2	5	9
3	Elina Born and Stig Rästa	"Goodbye to Yesterday"	89	10	44,974	10	20	1
4	Kali Briis Band	"Idiot"	53	4	2,217	5	9	7
5	Robin Juhkental and the Big Bangers	"Troubles"	77	7	1,791	3	10	6
6	Daniel Levi	"Burning Lights"	80	8	7,369	9	17	2
7	Elisa Kolk	"Superlove"	59	6	5,951	8	14	3
8	The Blurry Lane	"Exceptional"	24	1	4,360	6	7	8
9	Elephants From Neptune	"Unriddle Me"	88	9	2,211	4	13	4
10	Triin Niitoja and John4	"This is Our Choice"	53	5	4,736	7	12	5

Detailed Jury Votes
R/O	Song	Genka	E. Etti	I. Kohtla	K. Hirmo	E. Himma	P. Hõbemägi	K. Raudsepp	I. Vesik	R. Ahven	K. Randalu	Tanja	Total
1	"Minu päike"	5	3	4	3	3	2	1	2	5	3	3	34
2	"Üle vesihalli taeva"	2	5	7	6	8	8	4	1	1	2	4	48
3	"Goodbye to Yesterday"	9	9	10	9	7	7	5	7	10	6	10	89
4	"Idiot"	8	4	8	1	4	4	3	8	6	5	2	53
5	"Troubles"	6	6	9	2	9	9	6	9	8	7	6	77
6	"Burning Lights"	3	8	3	10	10	6	9	5	7	10	9	80
7	"Superlove"	7	7	5	8	2	5	8	3	3	4	7	59
8	"Exceptional"	1	1	1	5	5	1	2	4	2	1	1	24
9	"Unriddle Me"	10	10	6	7	6	10	7	10	9	8	5	88
10	"This is Our Choice"	4	2	2	4	1	3	10	6	4	9	8	53

Superfinal – 21 February 2015
R/O	Artist	Song	Televote	Place
1	Elina Born and Stig Rästa	"Goodbye to Yesterday"	71,429	1
2	Daniel Levi	"Burning Lights"	11,754	2
3	Elisa Kolk	"Superlove"	7,234	3

== At Eurovision ==
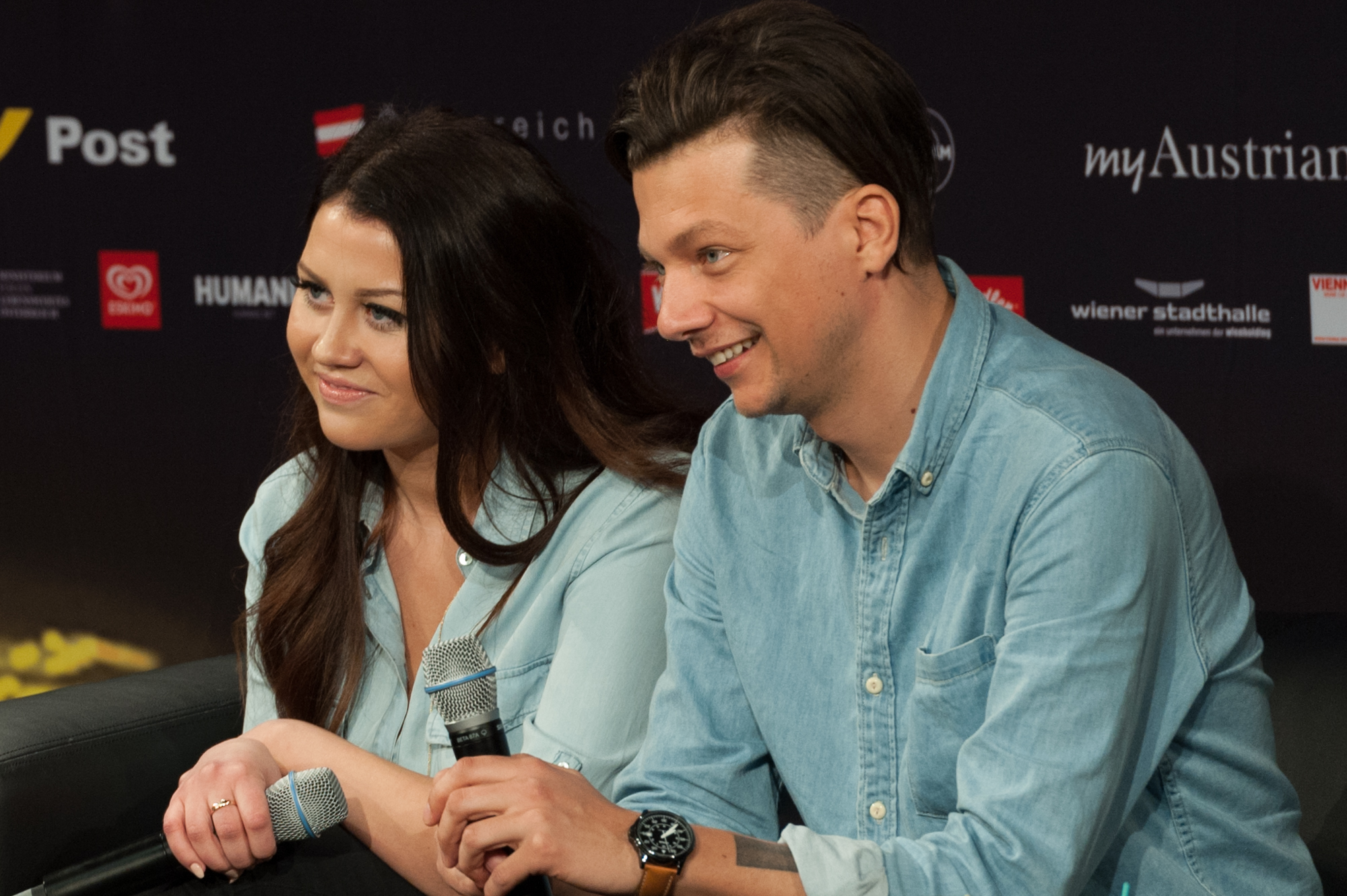
Elina Born and Stig Rästa during a press meet and greet

According to Eurovision rules, all nations with the exceptions of the host country and the "Big Five" (France, Germany, Italy, Spain and the United Kingdom) are required to qualify from one of two semi-finals in order to compete for the final; the top ten countries from each semi-final progress to the final. In the 2015 contest, Australia also competed directly in the final as an invited guest nation. The European Broadcasting Union (EBU) split up the competing countries into five different pots based on voting patterns from previous contests, with countries with favourable voting histories put into the same pot. On 26 January 2015, an allocation draw was held which placed each country into one of the two semi-finals, as well as which half of the show they would perform in. Estonia was placed into the first semi-final, to be held on 19 May 2015, and was scheduled to perform in the first half of the show.

Once all the competing songs for the 2015 contest had been released, the running order for the semi-finals was decided by the shows' producers rather than through another draw, so that similar songs were not placed next to each other. Estonia was set to perform in position 7, following the entry from Greece and before the entry from Macedonia.

The two semi-finals and the final were broadcast in Estonia on ETV with commentary by Marko Reikop. The first semi-final and final were also broadcast via radio on Raadio 2 with commentary by Mart Juur and Andrus Kivirähk. The Estonian spokesperson, who announced the Estonian votes during the final, was Tanja who had previously represented Estonia in the Eurovision Song Contest in 2014.

=== Semi-final ===
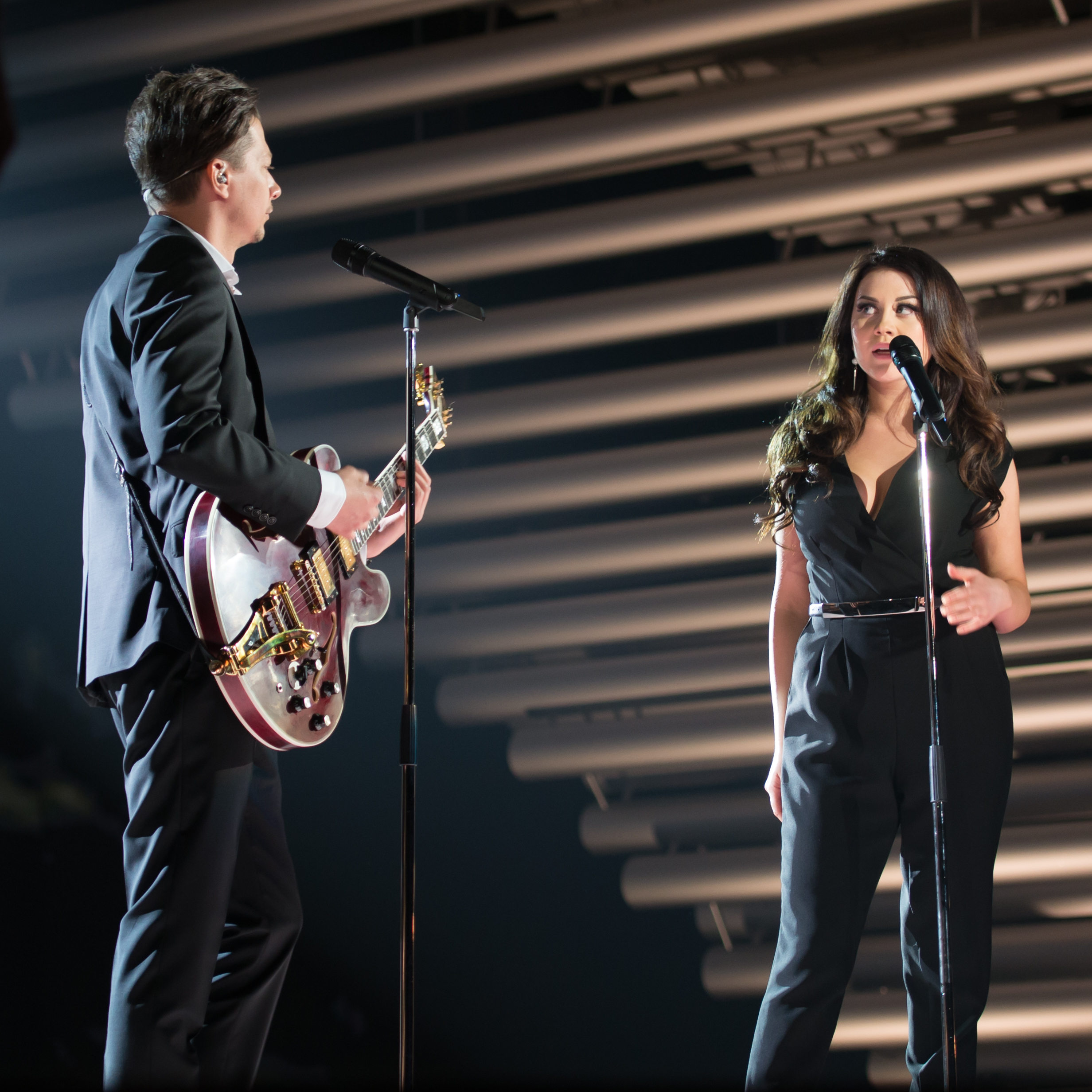
Elina Born and Stig Rästa during a rehearsal before the first semi-final

Elina Born and Stig Rästa took part in technical rehearsals on 11 and 15 May, followed by dress rehearsals on 18 and 19 May. This included the jury final where professional juries of each country, responsible for 50 percent of each country's vote, watched and voted on the competing entries.

The Estonian performance featured Elina Born dressed in a dark jumpsuit with a silver belt and Stig Rästa dressed in a dark suit with casual shoes. The staging for the song included dark colours with white accents and silhouettes of the performers projected on the LED stage floor. The LED screens displayed a shadowy cityscape with prominent skyscrapers. Rästa began the performance on stage alone and was then joined by Born during the first chorus. Born then finished the song on stage alone as Rästa exited during the final chorus.

At the end of the show, Estonia was announced as having finished in the top ten and subsequently qualifying for the grand final. It was later revealed that Estonia placed third in the semi-final, receiving a total of 105 points.

=== Final ===
Shortly after the first semi-final, a winner's press conference was held for the ten qualifying countries. As part of this press conference, the qualifying artists took part in a draw to determine which half of the grand final they would subsequently participate in. This draw was done in the order the countries were announced during the semi-final. Estonia was drawn to compete in the first half. Following this draw, the shows' producers decided upon the running order of the final, as they had done for the semi-finals. Estonia was subsequently placed to perform in position 4, following the entry from Israel and before the entry from the United Kingdom.

Elina Born and Stig Rästa once again took part in dress rehearsals on 22 and 23 May before the final, including the jury final where the professional juries cast their final votes before the live show. The duet performed a repeat of their semi-final performance during the final on 23 May. At the conclusion of the voting, Estonia finished in seventh place with 106 points.

=== Voting ===
Voting during the three shows consisted of 50 percent public televoting and 50 percent from a jury deliberation. The jury consisted of five music industry professionals who were citizens of the country they represent, with their names published before the contest to ensure transparency. This jury was asked to judge each contestant based on: vocal capacity; the stage performance; the song's composition and originality; and the overall impression by the act. In addition, no member of a national jury could be related in any way to any of the competing acts in such a way that they cannot vote impartially and independently. The individual rankings of each jury member were released shortly after the grand final.

Following the release of the full split voting by the EBU after the conclusion of the competition, it was revealed that Estonia had placed fifth with the public televote and eleventh with the jury vote in the final. In the public vote, Estonia scored 144 points, while with the jury vote, Estonia scored 53 points. In the first semi-final, Estonia placed second with the public televote with 129 points and tenth with the jury vote, scoring 60 points.

Below is a breakdown of points awarded to Estonia and awarded by Estonia in the first semi-final and grand final of the contest, and the breakdown of the jury voting and televoting conducted during the two shows:

==== Points awarded to Estonia ====
Points awarded to Estonia (Semi-final 1)
Score	Country
12 points	Spain
10 points	Austria; Russia
8 points	Belarus; Denmark; Finland; Hungary; Netherlands
7 points	
6 points	
5 points	Australia; Belgium
4 points	Armenia; France; Greece
3 points	Georgia
2 points	Macedonia; Moldova; Romania; Serbia
1 point	

Points awarded to Estonia (Final)
Score	Country
12 points	
10 points	Finland
8 points	Lithuania
7 points	Belarus; Hungary; Russia
6 points	Austria; Denmark; Latvia
5 points	
4 points	Albania; Azerbaijan; Netherlands
3 points	Australia; Israel; Malta; Norway; Spain; Sweden
2 points	Belgium; Cyprus; Georgia; Germany; Italy; Macedonia; Poland; Serbia
1 point	Iceland; Montenegro; Portugal

==== Points awarded by Estonia ====
Points awarded by Estonia (Semi-final 1)
Score	Country
12 points	Hungary
10 points	Belgium
8 points	Russia
7 points	Denmark
6 points	Georgia
5 points	Netherlands
4 points	Finland
3 points	Romania
2 points	Macedonia
1 point	Greece

Points awarded by Estonia (Final)
Score	Country
12 points	Russia
10 points	Sweden
8 points	Hungary
7 points	Belgium
6 points	Latvia
5 points	Australia
4 points	Norway
3 points	Italy
2 points	Lithuania
1 point	Georgia

==== Detailed voting results ====
The following members comprised the Estonian jury:

- Sven Lõhmus (jury chairperson) – songwriter, producer
- Olav Osolin – songwriter, commentator
- Dagmar Oja – singer
- Triin Niitoja – singer
- Egert Milder – singer, musician

Detailed voting results from Estonia (Semi-final 1)
R/O	Country	S. Lõhmus	O. Osolin	D. Oja	T. Niitoja	E. Milder	Jury Rank	Televote Rank	Combined Rank	Points
01	Moldova	6	12	11	14	12	11	13	12	
02	Armenia	14	13	12	13	11	14	14	15	
03	Belgium	1	1	2	4	1	1	4	2	10
04	Netherlands	3	9	5	1	6	4	8	6	5
05	Finland	11	8	15	15	7	12	1	7	4
06	Greece	7	14	6	11	13	10	11	10	1
07	Estonia									
08	Macedonia	8	7	8	3	3	5	12	9	2
09	Serbia	15	15	13	12	14	15	10	14	
10	Hungary	4	2	1	2	2	2	2	1	12
11	Belarus	13	11	10	9	15	13	9	11	
12	Russia	2	4	3	5	8	3	3	3	8
13	Denmark	9	10	9	6	4	7	5	4	7
14	Albania	12	5	7	10	10	9	15	13	
15	Romania	5	6	14	7	9	8	7	8	3
16	Georgia	10	3	4	8	5	6	6	5	6

Detailed voting results from Estonia (Final)
R/O	Country	S. Lõhmus	O. Osolin	D. Oja	T. Niitoja	E. Milder	Jury Rank	Televote Rank	Combined Rank	Points
01	Slovenia	9	10	21	11	9	9	12	11	
02	France	19	23	13	23	19	22	21	21	
03	Israel	13	11	19	24	10	15	13	13	
04	Estonia									
05	United Kingdom	24	24	24	18	16	23	14	18	
06	Armenia	26	20	22	25	23	25	24	26	
07	Lithuania	20	13	9	4	14	10	9	9	2
08	Serbia	23	25	26	22	25	26	19	23	
09	Norway	2	8	10	3	6	6	8	7	4
10	Sweden	3	4	2	5	4	2	2	2	10
11	Cyprus	21	14	14	20	21	20	15	17	
12	Australia	5	7	4	6	5	5	7	6	5
13	Belgium	7	2	1	10	2	4	5	4	7
14	Austria	12	16	15	7	13	11	18	15	
15	Greece	16	22	12	15	22	19	25	22	
16	Montenegro	17	15	25	26	26	24	23	24	
17	Germany	18	21	20	16	12	17	17	16	
18	Poland	15	12	17	19	24	18	20	19	
19	Latvia	11	1	8	13	1	7	4	5	6
20	Romania	10	9	23	8	18	13	10	12	
21	Spain	6	17	11	12	20	12	16	14	
22	Hungary	4	3	5	1	3	1	6	3	8
23	Georgia	25	6	7	9	7	8	11	10	1
24	Azerbaijan	14	18	16	21	15	16	22	20	
25	Russia	1	5	3	2	8	3	1	1	12
26	Albania	22	19	18	14	17	21	26	25	
27	Italy	8	26	6	17	11	14	3	8	3
