= Elina Born =

Estonian singer

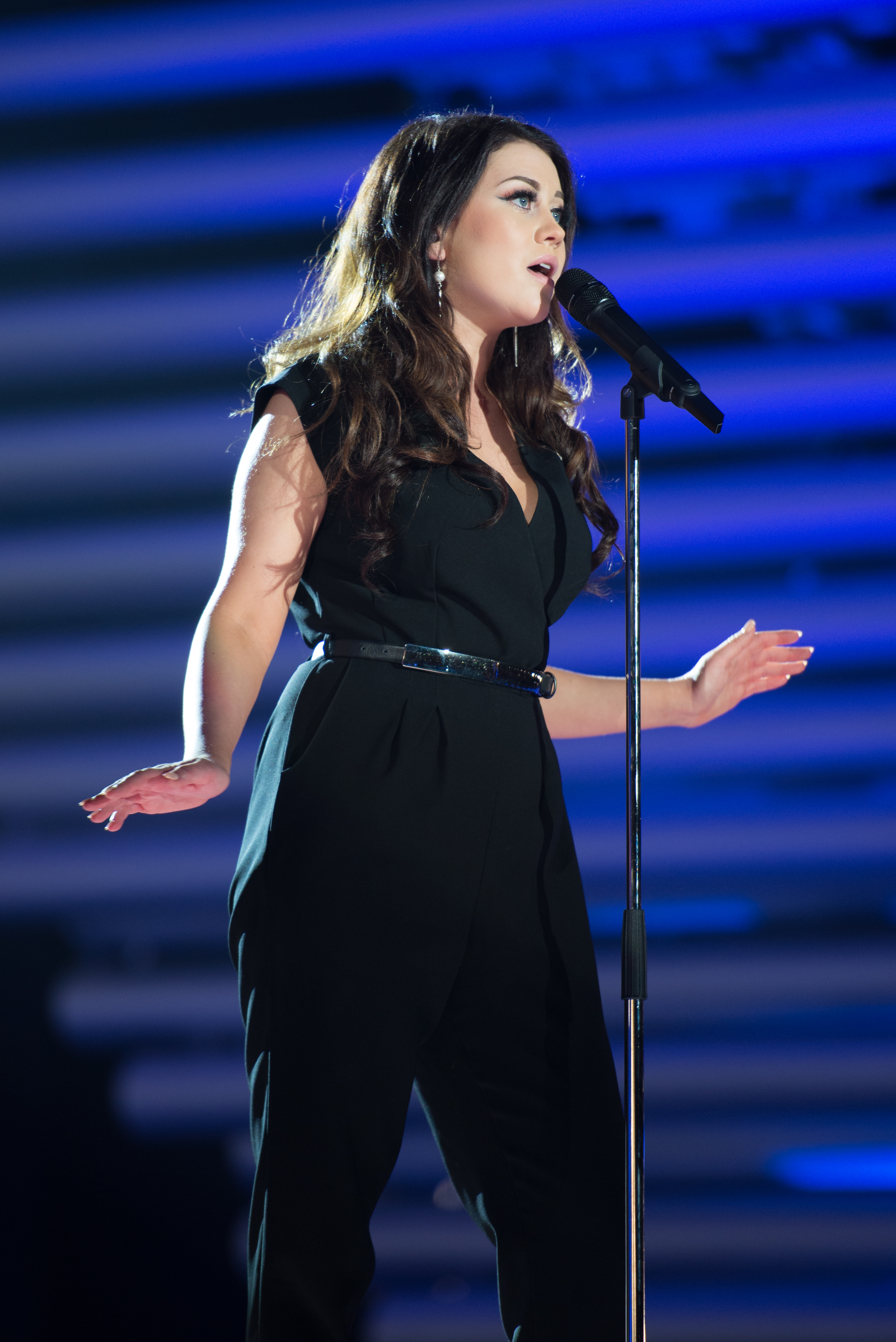
- Born performing in Vienna in 2015

Background information
- Born: 29 June 1994 (age 32); Lehtse, Estonia
- Genres: Pop
- Occupation: Singer
- Instrument: Vocals
- Years active: 2012–present

Elina Born (born 29 June 1994) is an Estonian singer. She represented Estonia in the Eurovision Song Contest 2015 along with Stig Rästa with the song "Goodbye to Yesterday". She previously attempted to represent Estonia in the Eurovision Song Contest in 2013 with the song "Enough", and attempted to represent Estonia at the Eurovision Song Contest in 2017 finishing last in the final. She was the runner-up of the fifth season of Eesti otsib superstaari.

== Biography ==
=== Early life ===
Elina Born was born on 29 June 1994 in Lehtse, Estonia. Stig Rästa discovered Elina Born on YouTube, she was singing "Cruz" by Christina Aguilera, he said "I was completely charmed by her musicality". Elina was at school when she received a message from Stig on her Facebook. Reflecting on the experience, Born stated, "To be honest, I started crying. It took me a couple of days to gather the courage to write back."

== Career ==
=== 2012–13: Eesti otsib superstaari & Eesti Laul ===
In 2012, Elina Born took part on Estonian reality-competition gameshow Eesti otsib superstaari (Estonia is Searching for a Superstar). The program seeks to discover the best singer in Estonia through a series of nationwide auditions. She made it through the audition, theatre round, studio round and final. She reached the Super Final but finished runner-up to Rasmus Rändvee.

Eesti otsib superstaari performances and results
Show	Song choice	Theme	Result
Auditions	—N/a	—N/a	Through to Theatre rounds
Theatre rounds	—N/a	—N/a	Through to Studio rounds
Studio rounds	"Somewhere Over The Rainbow" by Judy Garland	—N/a	Through to Finals
Finals
Week 1	"Nothing Compares 2 U" by Sinéad O'Connor	Biggest hits of all time	Safe
Week 2	"Cryin'" by Aerosmith	Songs from their year of birth.	Bottom two
Week 3	"Tule kui leebe tuul" by Seitsmes meel	Estonians' favourite songs.	Safe
Week 4	"Skyfall" from the film Skyfall	Film's soundtracks	Bottom three
Week 5	"Cry Me a River" by Julie London	with Bel-Etage Swing Orchestra	Safe
Week 6	"Nii kokku me ei saagi eal"	Songs by Jaak Joala	Safe
Week 6	"Poison" by Alice Cooper	Rock classics	Safe
Week 7	"Why Don't You Love Me" by Beyoncé	Dance track from Power Hit Radio's playlist.	Bottom two
Week 7	"Cruz" by Christina Aguilera	—N/a	Bottom two
Week 8	"Jõuluöö" ("O Holy Night")	Christmas song	Safe
Week 8	"Imagine" by John Lennon	Celebrity duet	Safe
Week 9: Super Final	"Nothing Compares To You" by Sinéad O'Connor	Favourite song	Runner-up
Week 9: Super Final	"Meil aiaäärne tänavas"	Estonian song	Runner-up

Elina Born participated in Eesti Laul 2013 with her first single, "Enough", written by Stig Rästa and Fred Krieger. She qualified for the final and finished 8th.

=== 2014–Present: Eurovision Song Contest & Eesti Laul ===
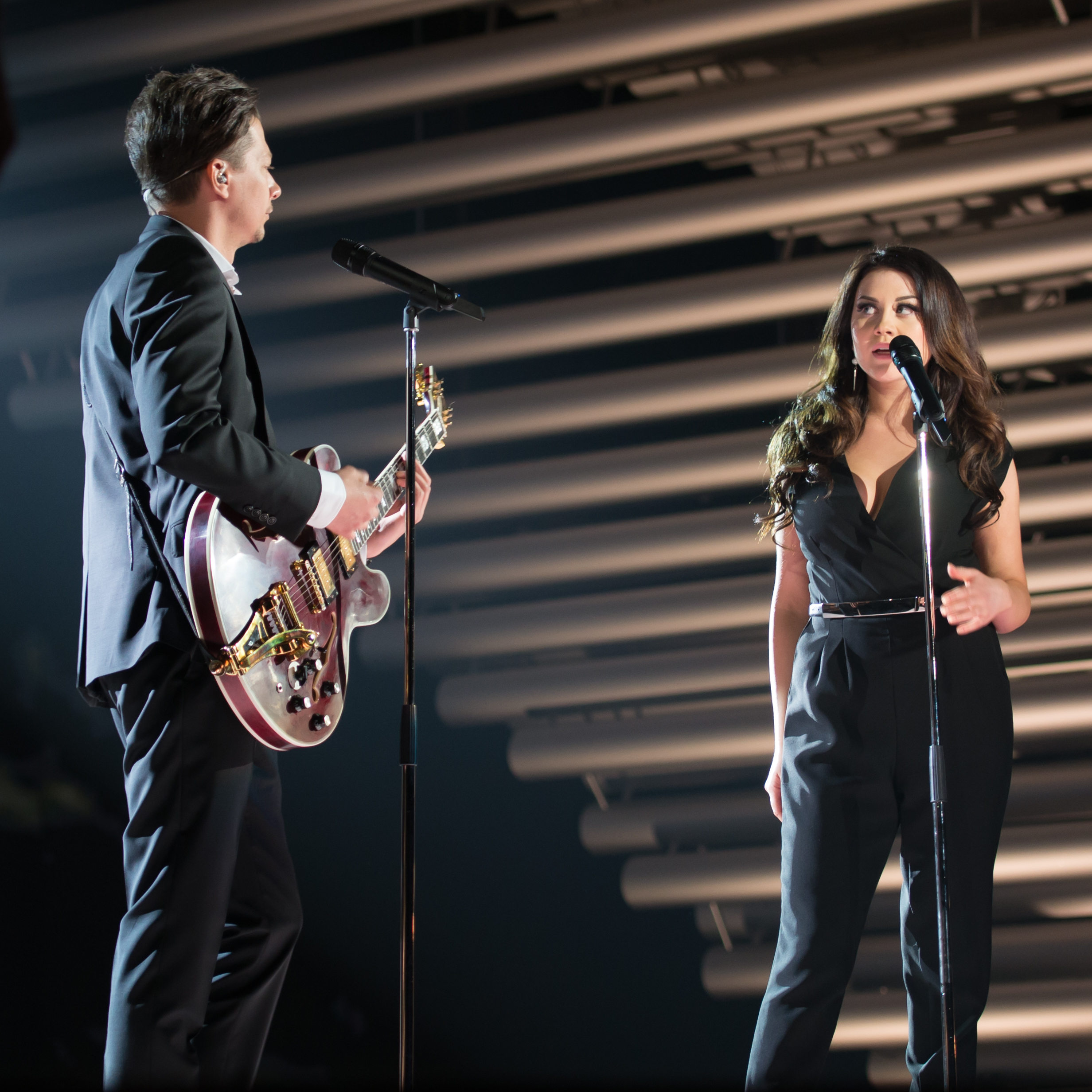
Elina Born & Stig Rästa 2015

Elina Born took part in Eesti Laul 2015 with Stig Rästa, organised by the Estonian broadcaster Eesti Rahvusringhääling (ERR). They took part in Semi-final 2 of Eesti Laul 2015 with the song "Goodbye to Yesterday" which took place on 14 February 2015. They progressed to the Final, which took place on 21 February 2015, and then to the Superfinal along with two other songs. They were chosen to represent Estonia at the Eurovision Song Contest 2015. Elina and Stig took 7th place in the final with a total of 106 points.

Two years later, in 2017, Elina came back to Eesti Laul with the song "In or Out", written by Stig Rästa, Vallo Kikas and Fred Krieger. She qualified for the final and finished 10th.

== Discography ==
=== Albums ===
Title	Details
Elina Born	Released: 18 May 2015; Label: Star Management; Format: CD, digital download

=== Singles ===
==== As lead artist ====
Title	Year	Peak chart positions									Album
Title	Year	EST	EST Nat.	AUT	GER	BEL (FL)	BEL (WA)	NL	SWE	SWI	Album
"Enough"	2012	3	—N/a	—	—	—	—	—	—	—	Elina Born
"Miss Calculation"	2013	1	—N/a	—	—	—	—	—	—	—	Elina Born
"Mystery"	2014	5	—N/a	—	—	—	—	—	—	—	Elina Born
"Goodbye to Yesterday" (with Stig Rästa)	2015	1	—N/a	8	71	32	42	73	51	68	Elina Born
"Kilimanjaro"	2015	3	—N/a	—	—	—	—	—	—	—	Elina Born
"In or Out"	2017	—	—N/a	—	—	—	—	—	—	—	Non-album singles
"Jagatud Saladus" (with Jüri Pootsmann)	2018	9	1	—	—	—	—	—	—	—	Non-album singles
"Tagasi Me"	2019	8	2	—	—	—	—	—	—	—	Non-album singles
"Kordumatu"	2019	—	40	—	—	—	—	—	—	—	Non-album singles
"Niiea"	2020	2	—	—	—	—	—	—	—	—	Non-album singles
"Linnuteid"	2021	—	—	—	—	—	—	—	—	—	
"—" denotes a single that did not chart or was not released in that territory.

==== As featured artist ====
Title	Year	Album
"The Otherside" (Tamar Kaprelian featuring Elhaida Dani, Elina Born, Maria-Elena Kyriakou & Stephanie Topalian)	2015	—N/a

Awards and achievements
Preceded by Tanja Mihhailova with "Amazing"	Estonia in the Eurovision Song Contest (with Stig Rästa); 2015	Succeeded by Jüri Pootsmann with "Play"
