= Goodbye to Yesterday (Elina Born and Stig Rästa song) =

2015 song by Elina Born and Stig Rästa

"Goodbye To Yesterday"

Single by Elina Born & Stig Rästa

from the album Elina Born
- Released: 8 January 2015
- Length: 2:59
- Label: Star Management
- Songwriter: Stig Rästa
- Lyricist: Stig Rästa

Music video
- "Goodbye To Yesterday" on YouTube

Eurovision Song Contest 2015 entry
- Country: Estonia
- Artists: Elina Born & Stig Rästa
- Language: English
- Composer: Stig Rästa
- Lyricist: Stig Rästa

Finals performance
- Semi-final result: 3rd
- Semi-final points: 105
- Final result: 7th
- Final points: 106

Entry chronology
- ◄ "Amazing" (2014)
- "Play" (2016) ►

Official performance video
- "Goodbye To Yesterday" (First Semi-Final) on YouTube "Goodbye To Yesterday" (Grand Final) on YouTube

"Goodbye to Yesterday" is a song by Estonian singers Elina Born and Stig Rästa. Described as a "melancholic duet" between Rästa and Born, the song was both written and lyrically composed by Rästa. It was released on 8 January 2015 by Star Management, and later served as the lead-off single from Born's self-titled debut studio album, Elina Born. The song was the Estonian entry at the Eurovision Song Contest 2015, held in Vienna, where it placed seventh.

Critical response of the song and the Eurovision performance was positive, with the song being considered one of the favourites to win the contest that year. "Goodbye To Yesterday" also received commercial success, topping the charts in its native Estonia. The song was also number two in Finland and reached the top 20 in the UK Independent Singles and Albums Charts.

== Background and composition ==
"Goodbye To Yesterday" was both composed and lyrically made by Estonian songwriter and singer Stig Rästa. Rästa had previously tried on numerous occasions to be the Estonian representative for the Eurovision Song Contest dating back to 2003, with all of his attempts coming with Rästa being part of a band.

According to Rästa, the lyrics of "Goodbye To Yesterday" were written "a couple years" before 2015 and are inspired by a combination of the life of a trucking driver and the era of the 1950s and 1960s, with Elina Born later stating that the song was written while the two were "a little dramatic while everything is boiling inside [us]". Rästa later discovered Elina Born from a YouTube video, and offered her to a sing a duet with him.

== Music video and promotion ==
An official music video was released on 16 March 2015. The music video, which was described as "Fatal Attraction mixed with Basic Instinct minus the gratuitous sex" by Wiwibloggs' Luis Fuster, premiered on the Eurovision Song Contest's official YouTube channel. The music video was produced by Hindrek Maasik, who wanted to leave the story's ending presented in the music video to be open-ended. To further promote the song, the duo performed the song at an Estonian pre-party in Tallinn organized by the Estonian OGAE branch.

== Critical reception ==
In a Wiwibloggs review containing several reviews from individual critics, the song was given a score of 8.50 out of 10 points, the highest out of any entry ranked by Wiwibloggs that year. Another review by ESCUnited that also contained several reviews from individual critics gave the song a score of 44 out of 60 points.

In the months heading toward the Eurovision Song Contest 2015, "Goodbye To Yesterday" was considered by bookmakers to be one of the favourites to win that year's contest. In January 2015, "Goodbye To Yesterday" was listed as the favourite to win the competition by way of betting odds. By March, the song had fallen in the odds but remained in the top three. After the song's qualification from the first semi-final, the song was listed as the sixth favourite to win the contest.

The Eurovision performance received positive reviews. Wiwibloggs writers William Lee Adams and Padraig Muldoon gave a highly positive review of the performance in rehearsals, praising the emotional weight of the performance. Stuart Heritage, writer for The Guardian, described the song in a live blog as "like the theme for a James Bond film and not a Duffy B-side like you think", calling it "one of the best songs so far." In another live blog, Charlotte Runcie, writer for The Daily Telegraph, also gave a positive review, stating, "it’s a good song with some dramatic doorway-based staging that looks as if it belongs in a student production of Pinter. Which is a good thing, I think."

== Eurovision Song Contest ==
=== Eesti Laul 2015 ===
Estonia's broadcaster Eesti Rahvusringhääling (ERR) organized a 20-entry competition, Eesti Laul 2015 with two semi-finals culminating into a grand final to select its entrant for the Eurovision Song Contest 2015. The edition was the seventh iteration of the national final. The two semi-finals were held on 7 and 14 February, and the final was held on 21 February. The winning song in the final was selected over two rounds of voting: the first round results selected the top three songs via the 50/50 combination of jury and public voting, while the second round (superfinal) determined the winner solely by public televoting.

"Goodbye To Yesterday" was officially announced to compete in the competition on 4 December 2014. It was placed into the second semi-final, where it managed to qualify to the grand final in first place on 14 February 2015. The performance was featured in black-and-white, and displayed a melancholic Rästa playing guitar, appearing shameful for a lack of love shown to Born. Born, who shows up later in the performance, appears both angry and tearful as the two showcase a yearning for getting back together in a romantic relationship. In the grand final held on 21 February, the duo performed a repeat of their heat performance, winning the contest, coming first with both the jury and televote. As a result, the duo won the Estonian spot for the Eurovision Song Contest 2015.

=== At Eurovision ===
The Eurovision Song Contest 2015 took place at the Wiener Stadthalle in Vienna, Austria and consisted of two semi-finals held on 19 and 21 May, respectively, and the final on 23 May 2015. According to Eurovision rules, all countries, except the host and the "Big Five" (France, Germany, Italy, Spain, and the United Kingdom), were required to qualify from one semi-final to compete in the final; the top ten countries from each semi-final progressed to the final. In a press conference held on 26 January 2015, a special allocation press conference was held to determine which countries would perform in each semi-final. Estonia was placed into the first semi-final, performing in the first half of the show.

For its Eurovision performance, the performance itself was altered slightly from the national final; the performance was in color and Born had to walk onto the stage instead of standing in one place, along with other minor outfit changes for Born. The song itself was not altered. The song was performed in seventh, after Greece's Maria Elena Kyriakou and before Macedonia's Daniel Kajmakoski. "Goodbye To Yesterday" finished third, receiving 105 points and securing a spot in the grand final.

Born and Rästa performed a repeat of their performance in the grand final on 23 May. The song was performed in fourth, after Israel's Nadav Guedj and before the United Kingdom's Electro Velvet. After the results were announced, the duo finished in seventh with 106 points. The song received no set of 12 points from any country; the highest one country gave it was a set of 10 points from Finland. In response to their result, the duo expressed satisfaction.

== Track listing ==
- Digital download (Note: This acts as a summary of all versions of the song released for digital download.)
1. "Goodbye To Yesterday" – 2:59

== Chart performance ==
=== Weekly charts ===
Chart (2015)	Peak position
Austria (Ö3 Austria Top 40)	8
Belgium (Ultratop 50 Flanders)	32
Belgium (Ultratop 50 Wallonia)	42
Estonia (Raadio Uuno)	1
Finland (Suomen virallinen lista)	2
Germany (GfK)	71
Netherlands (Single Top 100)	73
Sweden (Sverigetopplistan)	51
Switzerland (Schweizer Hitparade)	68
UK Indie (Official Charts)	18

== Release history ==
Country	Date	Format(s)	Label	Ref.
Various	8 January 2015	Digital download	Star Management	
