= On & On (Cartoon and Jéja song) =

Single by Cartoon and Jéja featuring Daniel Levi

from the album NCS: The Best of 2015
- Released: July 9, 2015
- Recorded: 2013–2014
- Genre: Dancehall pop; EDM
- Length: 3:26
- Label: NCS
- Songwriters: Ago Teppand, Daniel Levi Viinalass, Hugo Martin Maasikas, Joosep Järvesaar
- Producers: Ago Teppand, Hugo Martin Maasikas, Joosep Järvesaar

Cartoon singles chronology
| "Made Me Feel" (2015) | "On & On" (2015) | "Whatever I Do" (2015) |

Music video
- "On & On" on YouTube

"On & On" is a song by Estonian trio Cartoon and former member Jéja, featuring Estonian singer and songwriter Daniel Levi, released through NCS on July 9, 2015. It is certified Silver in the United Kingdom and Gold in the United States.

== Background ==
Cartoon at the time was a relatively small band which was formed between Joosep Järvesaar (known for being the lead singer of the band 'Bedwetters'), Hugo Martin Maasikas and Ago Teppand. On & On was their second song released on the NCS label, and quickly saw commercial success worldwide, with the song soon surpassing more than 100 million views on NCS's YouTube Channel. Four years after the release of the song, they released a Spanish version of the song, titled 'Más Y Más'.

A documentary video of the song was produced and posted on the NCS channel, and at its premiere, approximately 2,500 fans worldwide tuned in.

== Commercial performance ==
The song received 90 million views in its first two years, with the number now increasing to over 500 million views on NoCopyrightSounds' YouTube channel as of 2024, and reached #1 on the Estonian airplay chart in its 39th week. The song was found to have been used as background music in more than 4.8 million videos. Cartoon further claimed that in all these and other media combined, the song had been heard about 7.2 billion times, or nearly the entire population of the world.

== Remixes and other versions ==
=== On NCS ===
On December 31, 2019, Cartoon, Jéja and Levi released a Spanish version of On & On, titled Más y Más.

On December 24, 2021, Cartoon and Jéja released a VIP remix of On & On in collaboration with HAVSUN and WAYOUT.

On May 12, 2022, a remix package titled On & On Remixes was released containing the following tracks:

1. On & On (Time To Talk Remix)
2. On & On (nuumi Remix)
3. On & On (Affe & Cole Phillips Remix)

=== Outside NCS ===
Daniel Levi also released two other versions of the song: an acoustic version on October 25, 2017, to celebrate the original song surpassing 100 million views on NCS' YouTube channel, and a live version in May 2020 as part of a remote TV concert in Tallinn during COVID-19 quarantine.

== Charts ==
=== Year-end charts ===
Year-end chart performance
| Chart (2025) | Position |
|---|---|
| Estonia Airplay (TopHit) | 184 |

== Certifications ==
| Region | Certification | Certified units/sales |
|---|---|---|
| United Kingdom (BPI) | Silver | 200,000^{‡} |
| United States (RIAA) | Gold | 500,000^{‡} |
^{‡} Sales+streaming figures based on certification alone.
