= Winston Sterzel =

South African YouTuber

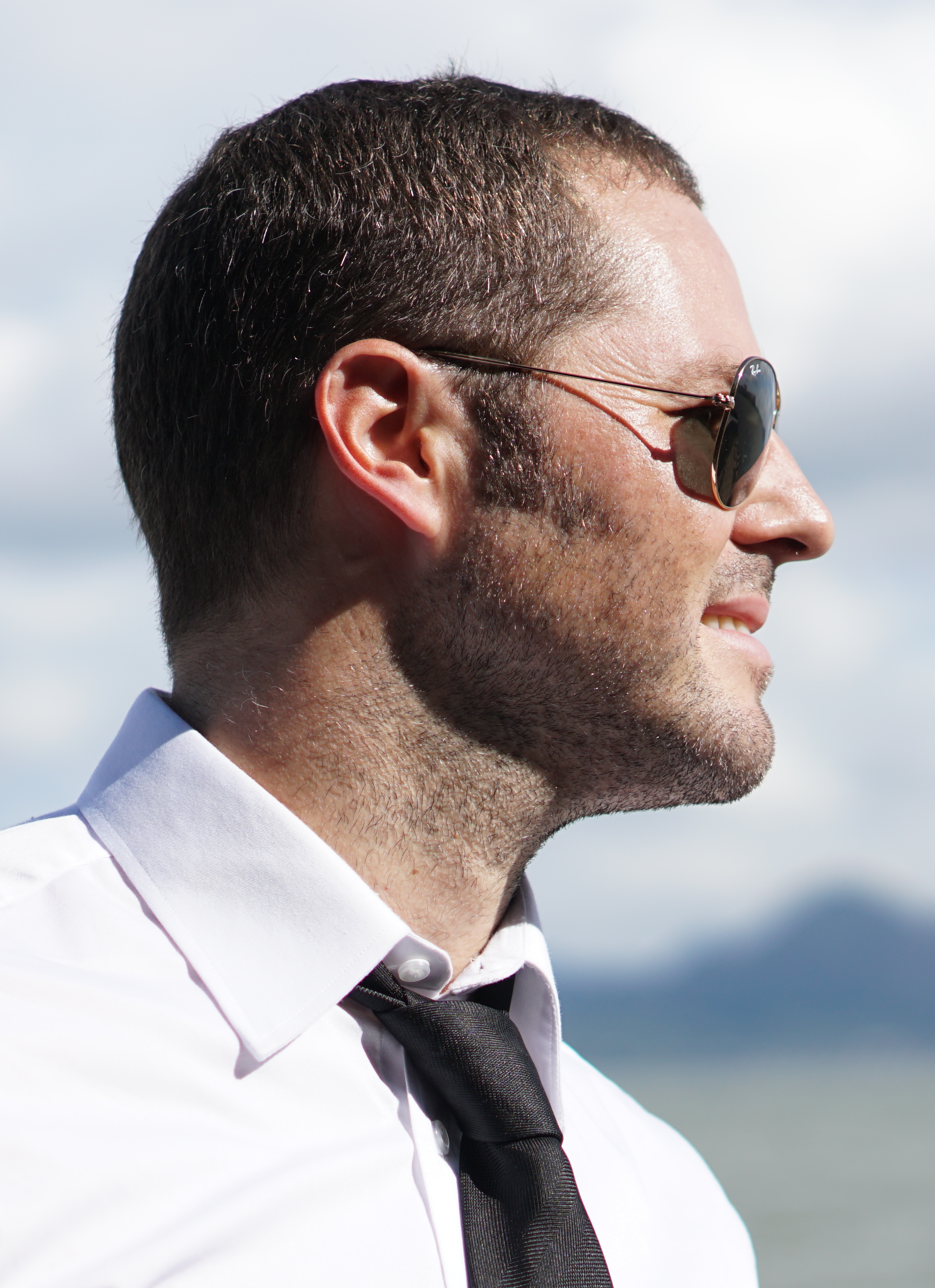
- Sterzel in 2017
- Born: August 17, 1980 (age 45); Cape Town, South Africa
- Occupation: YouTuber

YouTube information
- Channel: SerpentZA
- Genre: Vlog
- Subscribers: 1.59 million
- Views: 304 million
- Last updated: April 23, 2026
- Website: advchina.net

Winston Frederick Sterzel, also known by his YouTube pseudonym SerpentZA, is a South African vlogger and video producer. He lived in Shenzhen, Guangdong, China for fourteen years. His videos cover a variety of topics relating to Chinese politics and life in China from his personal perspective.

== Early life ==
Sterzel is of British heritage and was born and raised in South Africa. He moved to China to work as an English teacher after first visiting on business in 2005.

== Career ==
=== Life in China ===
In 2015, he was one of twelve South Africans in China profiled by China Radio International. He started uploading videos in China in 2007, and became a full-time vlogger in 2016. His videos primarily focus on life in China as viewed from his personal perspective.

Sterzel has also made videos about motorcycle trips through China. With fellow YouTuber Matthew Tye (who goes by Laowhy86) and other friends, he has taken extended journeys and produced documentary series titled Conquering Southern China and Conquering Northern China. He and Tye operate the YouTube channel ADVChina, a motorcycle travel vlog. Sterzel was also co-founder of a small, China-based custom motorcycle business, Churchill Custom Motorcycles, that is no longer in business.

=== Departure from China and subsequent videos ===
In late 2018, according to Sterzel and Tye, they faced increased harassment and threats from Chinese internet trolls. According to Sterzel, the trolls had threatened his wife and her employer with letters accusing Sterzel of being a spy, in an effort to get her fired. The month after, Michael Spavor, a business partner and friend of the pair, was detained by Chinese authorities. They reported this increased their fear for their own safety. As a result, Sterzel and Tye chose to leave China and moved to Los Angeles in 2019.

Following his departure from China, Sterzel's YouTube channel took a sharp turn into criticism of the Chinese government, using video titles such as "How China is slowly KILLING us all."
