= Raadio Uuno =

Estonian radio station

Coordinates: 59°24′46.41″N 24°45′24.5″E

Estonia
- Broadcast area: Estonia

Ownership
- Owner: AS TRIO LSL

History
- First air date: 1994

Links
- Website: www.uuno.ee

Raadio Uuno was an Estonian radio station. The station began operating in 1994, becoming the first music channel in Estonia. Radio Uuno is owned by the largest radio group in Estonia AS TRIO LSL. They have Eesti Top 40, official charts of Estonia which later turned into "Eesti Top 20".

On 5 September 2016, Trio LSL announced that Radio Uuno would soon cease operations and a radio station aimed at a similar target will be set up in its place. On October 1, 2016, the station was renamed 'MyHits'.
