= Jerry Duplessis discography =

Jerry "Wonda" Duplessis discography
- Studio albums: 6
- Extended plays: 1
- Compilation albums: 1
- Singles: 25

This is the discography of the Haitian American record producer, musician and songwriter Jerry "Wonda" Duplessis. Releases by The Fugees are listed on their article page.

== Albums ==
=== Studio albums ===
Year	Album	Chart positions				Certifications
Year	Album	U.S.	U.S. R&B	CAN	UK	Certifications
1997	The Carnival: Released: June 24, 1997	16	4	—	40	US: 2× Platinum; CAN: Platinum
2000	The Ecleftic: 2 Sides II a Book: Released: July 25, 2000	9	3	7	5	US: Platinum; CAN: Gold; UK: Silver
2002	Masquerade: Released: July 18, 2002	6	2	—	30	
2003	The Preacher's Son: Released: October 7, 2003	22	5	—	—	
2004	Welcome to Haiti: Creole 101: Released: October 5, 2004	—	—	—	—	
2007	Carnival Vol. II: Memoirs of an Immigrant: Released: December 4, 2007	28	9	—	—	
2010	Wyclef Jean: Released: — (Due 2010)	—	—	—	—	

=== Compilation ===
Year	Album	Chart positions			
Year	Album	U.S.	U.S. R&B	CAN	UK
2003	Greatest Hits: Released: October 7, 2003	—	—	—	—

=== EP ===
Year	Album	Chart positions			
Year	Album	U.S.	U.S. R&B	CAN	UK
2009	From the Hut, To the Projects, To the Mansion: Released: November 10, 2009	171	36	—	—

== Singles ==
Year	Title	Chart positions				Album
Year	Title	U.S. Hot 100	U.S. R&B	U.S. Rap	UK	Album
1997	"No, No, No"(Destiny's Child f/ Wyclef Jean)	3	1	5	7	Destiny's Child
1997	"We Trying to Stay Alive"(Wyclef Jean)	45	14	3	13	The Carnival
1997	"Guantanamera"(Wyclef Jean)	62	23	-	25	The Carnival
1998	"Gone till November"(Wyclef Jean)	7	9	2	3	The Carnival
1998	"Cheated (To All The Girls)"(Wyclef Jean)	61	48	6	-	The Carnival
1998	"Another One Bites the Dust"(Wyclef Jean)	-	-	-	5	Ghetto Supastar
1999	"New Day" (Wyclef Jean f/Bono)	-	118	-	23	Life
1999	"Maria Maria" (Carlos Santana f/ Wyclef Jean)	1	1	6	2	Supernatural
2000	"Low Income"(Wyclef Jean)	-	72	-	-	The Ecleftic: 2 Sides II a Book
2000	"It Doesn't Matter" (Wyclef Jean f/ The Rock)	-	80	25	3	The Ecleftic: 2 Sides II a Book
2000	"911" (Wyclef Jean f/Mary J. Blige)	38	6	8	9	The Ecleftic: 2 Sides II a Book
2001	"Perfect Gentleman"(Wyclef Jean)	-	108	-	4	The Ecleftic: 2 Sides II a Book
2001	"Loving You (Ole Ole Ole)" (with Brian Harvey - credited as "The Refugee Crew")	-	-	-	20	Solo
2001	"Wish You Were Here"(Wyclef Jean)	-	-	-	28	The Ecleftic: 2 Sides II a Book
2002	"One Nite Stand" (with Sarah Connor)	-	-	-	-	Unbelievable
2002	"Two Wrongs" (Wyclef Jean f/Claudette Ortiz)	28	11	-	14	Masquerade
2002	"Pussycat" (Wyclef Jean f/Tom Jones)	-	-	-	-	Masquerade
2003	"Learn Chinese" (with Jin)	-	-	-	-	The Rest Is History
2003	"Industry"(Wyclef Jean)	-	73	-	-	The Preacher's Son
2003	"Party to Damascus" (Wyclef Jean f/Missy Elliott)	65	34	17	-	The Preacher's Son
2004	"Take Me As I Am"(Wyclef Jean)	-	96	-	-	The Preacher's Son
2004	"Dance Like This" (Wyclef Jean f/Claudette Ortiz)	-	-	-	-	Dirty Dancing: Havana Nights OST
2006	"Hips Don't Lie" (with Shakira)	1	-	1	1	Oral Fixation Vol. 2
2006	"Dangerous" (with Ying Yang Twins)	85	84	-	87	Chemically Imbalanced
2007	"You Know What It Is" (T.I.)	34	11	-	48	T.I. Vs. T.I.P.
2007	"It Don't Make Any Difference to Me" (with Kevin Michael)	-	-	199	-	Kevin Michael
2007	"China Wine" (with Sun, Elephant Man, and Tony Matterhorn)	-	-	-	-	TBA
2007	"Sweetest Girl (Dollar Bill)"(Wyclef Jean)	12	110	-	66	Carnival Vol.II
2007	"Fast Car" (Wyclef Jean f/Paul Simon)	-	-	-	-	Carnival Vol.II
2007	"King and Queen" (Wyclef Jean f/Shakira)	-	-	-	96	Carnival Vol.II
2008	"I'm Ready"(Wyclef Jean)	123	116	-	-	Carnival Vol.II
2008	"Touch Your Button (Carnival Jam)"(Wyclef Jean)	-	-	-	-	Carnival Vol.II
2008	"No Substitute Love" (Estelle)	-	-	-	30	Shine
2008	"So Much Out The Way" (Estelle)	-	-	-	-	Shine
2009	"Haitian Slumdog Millionaire" (featuring Imposs)	-	-	-	-	From the Hut, To the Projects, To the Mansion
2010	"Hold On (Haiti)" (Wyclef Jean f/Mavado)	-	-	-	-	If I Were President: My Haitian Experience
2010	"U Smile" (Justin Bieber)	27	-	-	98	My World 2.0
