= Wyclef Jean discography =

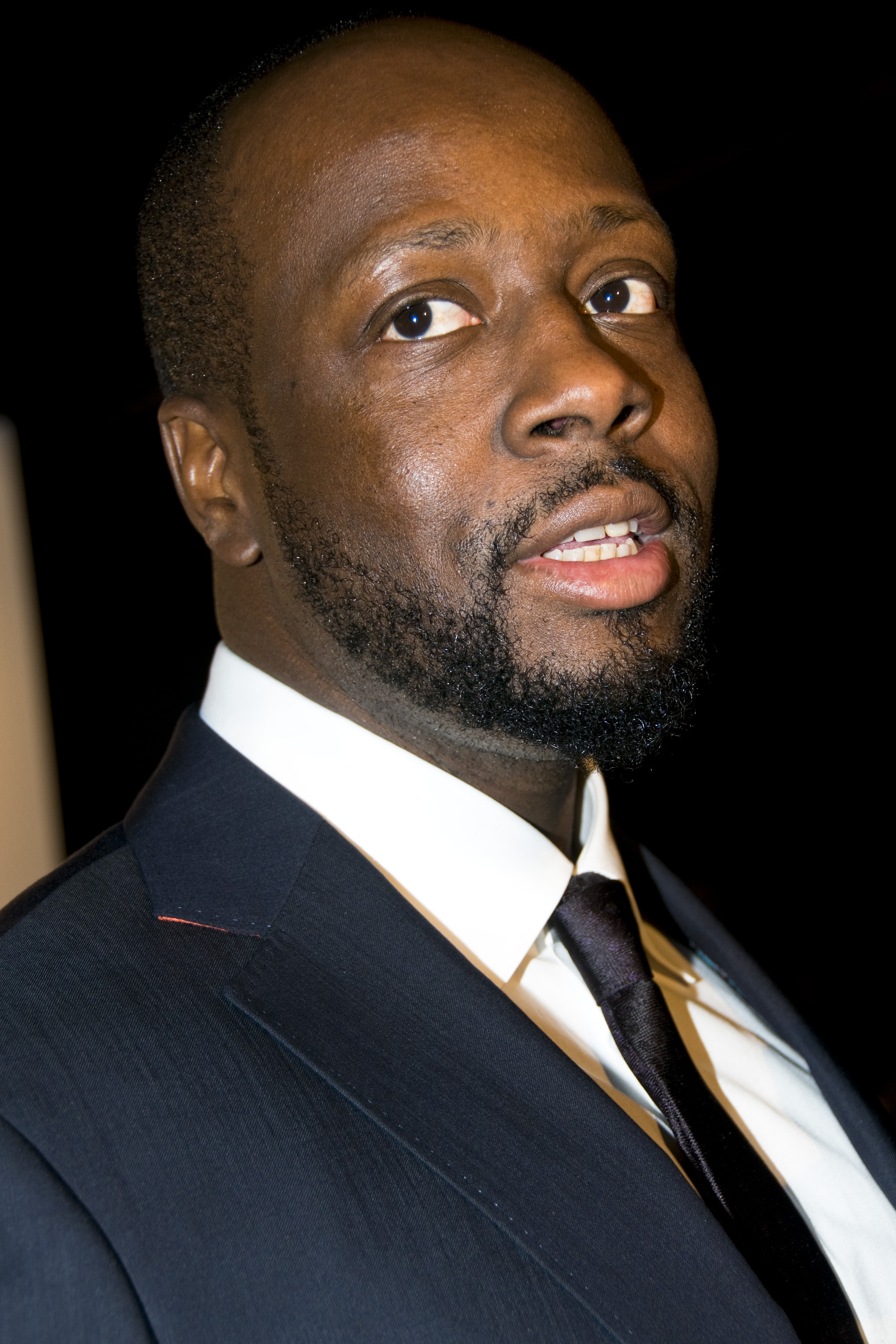
- Wyclef Jean in 2008
- Studio albums: 9
- Extended plays: 2
- Compilation albums: 1
- Singles: 25

Haitian rapper and singer Wyclef Jean has released nine studio albums, one compilation album, two extended plays and 25 singles.

== Albums ==
=== Studio albums ===
Year	Album	Chart positions					Certifications
Year	Album	AUS	CAN	UK	US	US R&B	Certifications
1997	Wyclef Jean Presents The Carnival: Released: June 24, 1997; Label: Sony Music/Columbia; Format: CD, cassette	—	42	40	16	4	RIAA: 2× Platinum; BPI: Silver; MC: Platinum
2000	The Ecleftic: 2 Sides II a Book: Released: July 25, 2000; Label: Columbia; Format: CD, cassette	83	7	5	9	3	RIAA: Platinum; BPI: Gold; MC: Gold
2002	Masquerade: Released: June 18, 2002; Label: Columbia; Format: CD	47	—	30	6	2	
2003	The Preacher's Son: Released: November 4, 2003; Label: Clef Records/J; Format: CD, digital download	—	54	—	22	5	
2004	Welcome to Haiti: Creole 101: Released: October 5, 2004; Label: Koch Records; Format: CD, digital download	—	24	—	—	66	
2007	Carnival Vol. II: Memoirs of an Immigrant: Released: December 4, 2007; Label: Columbia Records; Format: CD, digital download	—	—	—	28	9	
2009	From the Hut, To the Projects, To the Mansion: Released: November 10, 2009; Label: Columbia Records/Carnival House Records; Format: CD, digital download	—	—	—	171	36	
2017	Carnival III: The Fall and Rise of a Refugee: Released: September 15, 2017; Label: Heads Music; Format: LP, CD, digital download	—	—	—	112	14	
2019	Wyclef Goes Back to School Volume 1: Released: March 8, 2019; Label: Heads Music; Format: Digital download	—	—	—	—	—	

=== Compilation albums ===
- Greatest Hits (2003)

=== Mixtapes ===
List of mixtapes, with year released
Title	Album details
April Showers	Released: April 29, 2013; Label: Self-released; Format: Digital download
Wyclef Jean Inspired By...	Released: November 29, 2017; Label: Self-released; Format: Digital download

== EPs ==
- If I Were President: My Haitian Experience (2010)
- J'ouvert (2017)

== Singles ==
=== Lead appearances ===
Year	Title	Chart positions								Certifications	Album
Year	Title	AUS	CAN	FRA	NZ	UK	US	US R&B/HH	US Rap	Certifications	Album
1997	"We Trying to Stay Alive" (featuring the Bee Gees, Pras and John Forté)	—	6	—	5	13	45	14	3		The Carnival
1997	"Guantanamera" (featuring Celia Cruz, Jeni Fujita and Lauryn Hill)	—	—	—	15	25	—	23	—		The Carnival
1997	"Gone till November"	88	4	—	4	3	7	9	2	RIAA: Platinum; BPI: Silver	The Carnival
1998	"Cheated (To All the Girls)"	—	19	—	—	—	61	48	6	RIAA: Platinum	The Carnival
1998	"Another One Bites the Dust (Wyclef Jean Remix)" (with Pras and Free)	—	—	9	62	5	—	—	—		Small Soldiers (soundtrack)/Ghetto Supastar
1999	"New Day" (featuring Bono)	—	—	10	—	23	—	118	—		Life (soundtrack)
2000	"Low Income"	—	—	—	—	—	—	72	—		The Ecleftic/Next Friday (soundtrack)
2000	"It Doesn't Matter" (featuring The Rock)	—	8	63	—	3	—	80	25		The Ecleftic: 2 Sides II a Book
2000	"911" (featuring Mary J. Blige)	—	—	11	—	9	38	6	8	BPI: Silver	The Ecleftic: 2 Sides II a Book
2001	"Perfect Gentleman" (featuring Hope Harris)	58	—	—	34	4	—	108	—	BPI: Platinum; RMNZ: Gold	The Ecleftic: 2 Sides II a Book
2001	"Wish You Were Here"	—	—	—	—	28	—	—	—		The Ecleftic: 2 Sides II a Book
2002	"Two Wrongs" (featuring Claudette Ortiz)	5	—	88	1	14	28	11	—	ARIA: Platinum; RMNZ: 2× Platinum	Masquerade
2002	"Pussycat" (featuring Tom Jones)	58	—	—	—	—	—	—	—		Masquerade
2003	"Party to Damascus" (featuring Missy Elliott)	—	—	—	—	—	65	34	17		The Preacher's Son
2003	"Industry"	—	—	—	—	—	—	73	—		The Preacher's Son
2004	"Take Me as I Am"	—	—	—	—	—	—	96	—		The Preacher's Son
2004	"Hey Buster!"	—	—	—	—	—	—	—	—		Postcards from Buster
2004	"President"	—	—	—	—	—	—	—	—		Welcome to Haiti: Creole 101
2007	"Sweetest Girl (Dollar Bill)" (featuring Akon, Niia and Lil Wayne)	28	14	—	8	66	12	110	—	RIAA: Platinum; MC: Gold; RMNZ: 2× Platinum	Carnival Vol. II: Memoirs of an Immigrant
2007	"Fast Car" (featuring Paul Simon)	—	70	29	—	—	—	—	—		Carnival Vol. II: Memoirs of an Immigrant
2008	"Touch Your Button (Carnival Jam)"	—	—	—	—	—	—	—	—		Carnival Vol. II: Memoirs of an Immigrant
2008	"I'm Ready"	—	—	—	—	—	—	—	—		Non-album single
2009	"Warrior's Anthem"	—	—	—	—	—	—	—	—		From the Hut, To the Projects, To the Mansion
2009	"You Don't Wanna Go Outside"	—	—	—	—	—	—	—	—		From the Hut, To the Projects, To the Mansion
2010	"If I Was President"	—	—	—	—	—	—	—	—		Non-album singles
2010	"Hold On" (featuring Mavado)	—	—	—	—	—	—	—	—		Non-album singles
2010	"Election Time"	—	—	—	—	—	—	—	—		If I Were President: The Haitian Experience
2011	"Historia"	—	—	—	—	—	—	—	—		Non-album singles
2013	"Hip Hop"	—	—	—	—	—	—	—	—		Non-album singles
2014	"Dar um Jeito (We Will Find a Way)" (with Santana featuring Avicii and Alexandre Pires)	—	—	—	—	—	—	—	—		One Love, One Rhythm
2014	"Divine Sorrow" (featuring Avicii)	—	—	105	—	—	109	—	—		Non-album single
2017	"My Girl" (featuring Sasha Mari)	—	—	—	—	—	—	—	—		J'ouvert
2017	"Hendrix"	—	—	—	—	—	—	—	—		J'ouvert
2017	"If I Was President 2016"	—	—	—	—	—	—	—	—		Non-album single
2017	"I Swear" (featuring Young Thug)	—	—	—	—	—	—	—	—		J'ouvert
2017	"Fela Kuti"	—	—	—	—	—	—	—	—		Carnival III: The Fall and Rise of a Refugee
2017	"What Happened to Love" =(featuring LunchMoney Lewis and The Knocks)	—	—	150	—	—	—	—	—		Carnival III: The Fall and Rise of a Refugee
2018	"Sak Kap Fet"	—	—	—	—	—	—	—	—		Carnival III: The Fall and Rise of a Refugee
2018	"I Pray"	—	—	—	—	—	—	—	—		Non-album single
2018	"All or Nothing" (with Ray BLK and Naughty Boy)	—	—	—	—	—	—	—	—		Bungee Jumping
2018	"Mystery" (with K-391)	—	—	—	—	—	—	—	—		Non-album single
"—" denotes a recording that did not chart or was not released.

=== Featured appearances ===
Year	Title	Chart positions				Certifications	Album
Year	Title	AUS	UK	US	US R&B	Certifications	Album
1997	"No, No, No Part 2" (Destiny's Child featuring Wyclef Jean)	72	5	3	1		single
1998	"Don't Release Me (Wyclef Jean Remix)" [Gloria Estefan featuring Wyclef Jean]	—	—	—	—		Gloria!
1998	Horse & Carriage (Remix) [Cam'ron featuring Wyclef Jean, Charli Baltimore, Big Pun & Silkk the Shocker]						single
1999	"In the Zone" (Ivy Queen featuring Wyclef Jean)	—	—	— (Note: "In the Zone" did not enter the Billboard Hot 100, but peaked at number 38 on the Rhythmic Songs chart.)	—		The Original Rude Girl
1999	"Blood Is Thicker Than Water" [Wyclef Jean featuring G&B (The Product)]	—	—	—	—		The Sopranos: Music from the HBO Original Series
2000	"Maria Maria" (Santana featuring The Product G&B and Wyclef Jean)	49	6	1	1	BPI: Platinum	Supernatural
2000	"Love Me Now" (Beenie Man featuring Wyclef Jean)	—	—	—	90		Art and Life
2001	"Coast 2 Coast (Suavemente)" (Angie Martinez featuring Wyclef Jean)	—	—	—	—		Up Close and Personal
2001	"Loving You (Ole Ole Ole)" (with Brian Harvey - credited as "The Refugee Crew")	—	20	—	—		Solo
2002	"One Nite Stand (of Wolves and Sheep)" (Sarah Connor featuring Wyclef Jean)	—	—	—	—		Unbelievable
2003	"Shape of You (Reshaped)" (With Beverley Knight & Hollywood)	—	—	—	—		Who I Am
2004	"Learn Chinese" (Jin featuring Wyclef Jean)	—	—	—	—		The Rest Is History
2006	"Hips Don't Lie" (Shakira featuring Wyclef Jean)	1	1	1	—	BPI: 4× Platinum	Oral Fixation Vol. 2
2006	"Nuestro Himno"	—	—	—	—		Somos Americanos
2006	"Dangerous" (Ying Yang Twins featuring Wyclef Jean)	98	—	85	84		Chemically Imbalanced
2007	"You Know What It Is" (T.I. featuring Wyclef Jean)	—	—	34	11		T.I. Vs. T.I.P.
2007	"It Don't Make Any Difference to Me" (Kevin Michael featuring Wyclef Jean)	—	199	—	—		Kevin Michael
2007	"Five-O" (Elephant Man featuring Wyclef Jean)	—	—	—	—		Let's Get Physical
2007	"China Wine" (with Sun, Elephant Man, and Tony Matterhorn)	—	—	—	—		Non-album single
2008	"Roll Out" (Labelle featuring Wyclef Jean)	—	—	—	—		Back to Now
2008	"Electric City" (Wyclef Jean and Nikki Yanofsky)	—	—	—	—		The Electric Company
2009	"Valentine" (Tatiana Okupnik featuring Wyclef Jean)	—	—	—	—		Non-album singles
2010	"Murderer" (Barrington Levy featuring Wyclef Jean, Snoop Dogg and Shaggy)	—	—	—	—		Non-album singles
2010	"Deep Down in My Heart" (Desiree featuring Wyclef Jean)	—	—	—	—		Non-album singles
2011	"Playaz Club 2011 Remix (Another Carjack)" (Rappin' 4-Tay featuring Wyclef Jean)	—	—	—	—		Non-album singles
2012	"Antenna (Remix)" (Fuse ODG featuring Wyclef Jean)	—	7	—	—		Non-album singles
2016	"Kiss the Sky" (The Knocks featuring Wyclef Jean)	—	—	—	—		55
2016	"Zoom Zoom" (Gorgon City featuring Wyclef Jean)	—	—	—	—		Kingdom
2017	"Todas" (Cro featuring Wyclef Jean)	—	—	—	—		tru.
2017	"Dimelo" (Rak-Su featuring Wyclef Jean and Naughty Boy)	—	2	—	—	BPI: Gold	TBA
2018	"Casanova" (Farina featuring Wyclef Jean)	—	—	—	—		Casanova
2019	"Dear Future Self (Hands Up)" (Fall Out Boy featuring Wyclef Jean)	—	—	—	—		Greatest Hits: Believers Never Die – Volume Two
2026	"Hello God" (Tamela Mann featuring Wyclef Jean and Kirk Franklin)	—	—	— (Note: "Hello God" did not enter the Billboard Hot 100 chart, but peaked at number 25 on the Billboard Hot Gospel Songs chart.)	—		Non-album single

== Guest appearances ==
Year	Song	Album
1997	"John 3:16" (Muggs featuring Wyclef Jean)	Soul Assassins Chapter 1
1997	"Everyone Wants to Be" (Ziggy Marley and the Melody Makers featuring Wyclef Jean)	Fallen Is Babylon
1998	"Caribbean Connection" (Big Pun featuring Wyclef Jean)	Capital Punishment
1998	"Bubblegoose" (South Park featuring Wyclef Jean)	Chef Aid: South Park
1999	"I Got Sabrina Comin' Up (Intro)" [Sabrina Setlur featuring Wyclef Jean]	Aus der Sicht und mit den Worten von...
1999	"Never Again" (Tevin Campbell featuring Wyclef Jean)	Tevin Campbell
1999	"Bug a Boo (Remix)" [Destiny's Child featuring Wyclef Jean]	Bug a Boo
1999	"Dance 4 Me" (Beres Hammond featuring Wyclef Jean)	Music Is Life
2000	"Birima (Remix)" [Youssou N'Dour featuring Wyclef Jean]	Joko: From Village to Town
2000	"Rap Song" (Black Eyed Peas featuring Wyclef Jean)	Bridging the Gap
2000	"Where's Bob Dylan When You Need Him?" (John Oszajca featuring Wyclef Jean)	From There to Here
2002	"It's Yours" (Pacewon featuring Wyclef Jean)	Won
2003	"Do You Know" (Da Band featuring Wyclef Jean)	Too Hot for TV
2003	"Nino Brown" (DJ Kay Slay featuring Wyclef Jean and Hollywood)	The Streetsweeper, Vol. 1
2003	"Hold On" (Timbaland & Magoo featuring Wyclef Jean)	Under Construction, Part II
2004	"Secret Lover" (Admiral T featuring Lynsha and Wyclef Jean)	Mozaik kréyol
2004	"This Is Love" (Tanya Stephens featuring Wyclef Jean)	Gangsta Blues
2004	"Dance Like This" (Wyclef Jean featuring Claudette Ortiz)	Dirty Dancing: Havana Nights OST
2005	"Carnival Survivors", "Jump Up", "You" (Machel Montano featuring Wyclef Jean)	The Xtatik Experience
2005	"Ladies & Thugs" (DJ Quik featuring Wyclef Jean)	Trauma
2006	"Why Don't We (Aman Aman)" (Tarkan featuring Wyclef Jean)	Come Closer
2006	"In Tel Aviv" (Subliminal featuring Wyclef Jean)	Just When You Thought Its All Over
2007	"My Swag" (T.I. featuring Wyclef Jean)	T.I. vs. T.I.P.
2007	"Please Man" (Big & Rich featuring Wyclef Jean)	Between Raising Hell and Amazing Grace
2008	"Mr. President" (LL Cool J featuring Wyclef Jean)	Exit 13
2008	"Caribbean Connection" (Lil' Kim featuring Wyclef Jean & Mavado)	Vintage
2008	"You Think You Got It Bad?!" (Lyfe Jennings featuring Wyclef Jean)	Lyfe Change
2008	"Sunny Day" (Akon featuring Wyclef Jean)	Freedom
2009	"Rewind" (Flo Rida featuring Wyclef Jean)	R.O.O.T.S.
2009	"Spy" (Shakira featuring Wyclef Jean)	She Wolf
2009	"Spanish Fly" (Aventura featuring Wyclef Jean and Ludacris)	The Last
2011	"Nymphomaniac" (Travis Barker featuring Jim Jones & Wyclef Jean)	Let the Drummer Get Wicked
2011	"God Bless the Child" (Jim Jones featuring Wyclef Jean)	Capo
2016	"Kanye West" (Young Thug featuring Wyclef Jean)	Jeffery

== Production discography ==
List of production and songwriting credits (excluding guest appearances, interpolations, and samples) for other artists
Track(s)	Year	Artist(s)	Album
"Hole in the Bucket (Slave Ship Remix)"	1995	Spearhead	"Hole in the Bucket"
"Recognition"	1995	Fugees	Pump Ya Fist (Hip Hop Black Panthers)
"Look What You've Done (Refugee Camp Remix)"	1995	Asante	"LWYD"
"Angel (U.K. Remix)"	1996	Simply Red	Set It Off (soundtrack)
"BOOM BIDDY BYE BYE (Fugees Remix)"	1996	Cypress Hill, Fugees	Unreleased and Revamped
"Hip-Hopera"	1996	Bounty Killer, Fugees	My Experience
"Doin Time (Wyclef Remix)"	1996	Sublime	12"
"Bellvue da Bomb"	1997	Kulcha Don	Original Wucka Man
"Avenues"	1997	Pras	Money Talks (soundtrack)
"The Sweetest Thing"	1997	Refugee Camp All-Stars, Lauryn Hill	Love Jones (soundtrack)
"Tell Me Is It True (Fugees Remix)"	1997	UB40	12"
"Spirit (Refugee Remix)"	1997	Sounds of Blackness	12"
"Tuck Me In (Wyclef Remix)"	1997	Kimberly Scott	12"
"Blood on the Dance Floor (Refugee Camp Remix)"	1997	Michael Jackson	12"
"Use Me" (Refugee Remix)	1997	Coolbone	12"
"No No No Part II"	1997	Destiny's Child	"No, No, No"
"Illusion"	1998	Destiny's Child	Destiny's Child
"Gone Til November (Makin' Runs Remix)	1998	Wyclef Jean	"Gone till November"
"No Airplay (Men in Blue)"	1998	Wyclef Jean, Youssou N'Dour	"Gunpowder"
"Another One Bites the Dust (Wyclef Jean Remix)"/"Another One Bites the Dust (Wyclef Jean Remix) [Video Version]	1998	Queen, Wyclef Jean, Pras, Free/Canibus	Small Soldiers (soundtrack)
"Ninety-Nine (Flash the Message)"	1998	John Forté	Poly Sci
"So Into You (Wyclef Remix)	1998	Tamia	"So Into You"
"Baby Can I Hold You"	1998	Andrea Martin	The Best of Me
"Shining Star"	1998	Sunz of Man, Ol' Dirty Bastard	The Last Shall Be First
"Here We Go"	1998	Funkmaster Flex, Wyclef, Khadeija	The Mix Tape, Vol. III
"It's a Party"	1998	Bounty Killer, Smif-N-Wessun	Next Millennium
"Second Round K.O."	1998	Canibus	Can-I-Bus
"I Honor U"	1998	Canibus	Can-I-Bus
"Buckingham Palace"	1998	Canibus	Can-I-Bus
"Rip Rock"	1998	Canibus	Can-I-Bus
"How Come"	1998	Canibus, Youssou N'Dour	Bulworth (soundtrack)
"Mastablasta '98"	1998	Stevie Wonder, Wyclef Jean	How Stella Got Her Groove Back (soundtrack)
"Ghetto Supastar (That Is What You Are)"	1998	Pras, Ol' Dirty Bastard, Mya	Ghetto Supastar/Bulworth (soundtrack)
"My Love Is Your Love"	1998	Whitney Houston	My Love Is Your Love
"Don't Release Me (Wyclef Remix)"	1998	Gloria Estefan	Gloria!
"Holiday"	1999	Earth, Wind & Fire, Marie Antoinette	The PJs (soundtrack)
"25 to Life"	1999	Xzibit, Nature, Reptile, Juvenile, Method Man	Life (soundtrack)
"Lovin You (The Remix)"	1999	Sparkle	Life (soundtrack)
"What Would You Do?"	1999	City High	Life (soundtrack)
"What Goes Around"	1999	Khadeija	Life (soundtrack)
"New Day"	1999	Wyclef Jean, Bono	Life (soundtrack)
"Loving Your Best Friend"	1999	Eric Benét	A Day in the Life
"Never Again"	1999	Tevin Campbell	Tevin Campbell
"Blood Is Thicker Than Water"	1999	Wyclef Jean, The Product G&B	Music on The Sopranos
"Maria Maria"	1999	Santana, The Product G&B	Supernatural
"Low Income"	1999	Wyclef Jean	Next Friday (soundtrack)
"Pussycat"	2000	Mya	Fear of Flying
"Lie Detector"	2000	Mya	Fear of Flying
"Dancing Lessons"	2000	Sinéad O'Connor	Faith and Courage
"Rap Song"	2000	Black Eyed Peas, Wyclef	Bridging the Gap
"Birima (Remix)"	2000	YouSsou N'Dour, WYclef	Joko
"Another Lover"	2001	Dane	Facing the Crowd
"10 Love Commandments"	2001	Jimmy Cozier	Jimmy Cozier
"heartfelt Letter"	2001	Jimmy Cozier	Jimmy Cozier
"Time Stands Still"	2001	Jimmy Cozier	Jimmy Cozier
"Ole Ole Ole (Loving You)"	2001	Brian Harvey, Wyclef	Solo
"Cluck Cluck"	2001	Wyclef Jean, The Product G&B	Dr. Dolittle 2 (soundtrack)
"Hide Away"	2001	Mick Jagger	Goddess in the Doorway
"It's Yours"	2002	Pacewon, Wyclef	Won
"One Nite Stand of Wolves & Sheep"	2002	Sarah Connor	Unbelievable
"Since Supernatural"	2002	Santana	Shaman
"Nino Brown"	2003	DJ Kay Slay, Wyclef	The Streetsweeper, Vol. 1
"Shape of You (Reshaped)"	2003	Beverly Knight	Who I Am
"Learn Chinese"	2004	Jin, Wyclef	The Rest Is History
"Dance"	2004	Jimmy Cliff	Black Magic
"Two Steps Closer"	2004	Jody Lei	Just the Music
"So High (Cloud 9 Remix)"	2005	John Legend, Lauryn Hill	"So High"
"Ghetto"	2005	Leela James	A Change Is Gonna Come
"Step Up"	2006	Samantha Jade	Step Up (Original Soundtrack)
"I Apologize"	2006	Lionel Richie	Coming Home
"Make Love to You"	2006	Governor	Son of Pain
"The Whistle Song"	2007	Lumidee	Unexpected
"No Substitute Love"; "So Much Out the Way"	2008	Estelle	Shine
"You Think You Got It Bad"	2008	Lyfe Jennings	Lyfe Change
"Good Girls (Don't Grow on Trees)"	2014	Cris Cab, Big Sean	Where I Belong
