= Greatest Hits (Wyclef Jean album) =

Greatest hits album by Wyclef Jean
- Released: October 7, 2003
- Recorded: 1996–2003
- Genre: Reggae; hip-hop; R&B
- Length: 72:29
- Label: Columbia
- Producer: Wyclef Jean; R. Kelly; Jerry "Wonda" Duplessis; Shea Taylor; Pras Michel; Ché Guevara

Wyclef Jean chronology
Masquerade (2002)	Greatest Hits (2003)	The Preacher's Son (2003)

Singles from Greatest Hits
- 1. "Ghetto Religion" Released: September 22, 2003

Professional ratings
Review scores
Source	Rating
AllMusic	4/5 stars
Rolling Stone	3/5 stars

Greatest Hits is the first compilation album by Haitian rapper Wyclef Jean, released on October 7, 2003. Released just a month prior to his fourth studio album, The Preacher's Son, Greatest Hits contains singles taken from Jean's first three studio albums: The Carnival, The Ecleftic: 2 Sides II a Book and Masquerade, as well as other fan-favourite tracks from those albums, alongside two-newly recorded tracks: "Ghetto Religion", a collaboration with R. Kelly, and "Hey Girl". The album also contains "No Woman, No Cry", a track taken from the Fugees' second studio album, The Score. Notably, Greatest Hits would be Jean's last release on Columbia Records until Carnival Vol. II: Memoirs of an Immigrant in 2007.

A deluxe edition of the album, released in the UK and Australia, contains a bonus disc with remixes of some of Wyclef's biggest hits, including collaborations with Canibus, R. Kelly, Xzibit, King Yellowman and Beenie Man. Although no singles were officially released from the album, "Ghetto Religion" was serviced as a US-radio only airplay single in September 2003. Notably, "Pussycat", which samples the original by Tom Jones, is the only single from the first three albums to omitted from the tracklisting. The US edition of the album removes a number of notable singles, and shortens the tracklisting by four tracks. "Diallo" and "Something About Mary" from The Ecleftic are included on this version.

== Track listing ==
Greatest Hits – Standard edition
No.	Title	Writer(s)	Producer(s)	Length
1.	"Ghetto Religion" (featuring R. Kelly)	Wyclef Jean; Jerry Duplessis; R. Kelly	R. Kelly	3:34
2.	"We Trying to Stay Alive" (featuring John Forté and Pras)	Jean; John Forté; Pras Michel; Barry Gibb; Maurice Gibb; Robin Gibb	Pras Michel	3:11
3.	"Perfect Gentleman" (featuring Hope)	Jean; Duplessis; Hope Harris	Jerry 'Wonda' Duplessis	4:09
4.	"911" (featuring Mary J. Blige)	Jean; Duplessis	Jerry 'Wonda' Duplessis	4:19
5.	"Gone 'Till November"	Jean; Duplessis	Jean	3:33
6.	"Guantanamera" (featuring Celia Cruz, Jeni Fujita and Lauryn Hill)	Jean; Duplessis; Lauryn Hill; Pete Seeger; Julián Orbón; Joseíto Fernández; José Martí	Jean	4:30
7.	"Hey Girl" (featuring Ayesha and Papa Don)	Jean; Duplessis; Shea Taylor; D. Patterson	Shea Taylor, Jerry 'Wonda' Duplessis	3:33
8.	"It Doesn't Matter" (featuring The Rock and Melky Sedeck)	Jean; Duplessis; Andrew Alexander Long; Bill Danoff; Desmond Child; John Denver; Ricky Walters; Robi Rosa; Taffy Danoff	Jerry 'Wonda' Duplessis	3:57
9.	"Anything Can Happen"	Jean; Duplessis	Jean	4:36
10.	"Thug Angels" (featuring Small World)	Jean; Duplessis	Jerry 'Wonda' Duplessis	6:35
11.	"Gunpowder" (featuring Lauryn Hill)	Jean	Jean	4:24
12.	"Knockin' on Heaven's Door"	Jean; Bob Dylan	Jerry 'Wonda' Duplessis	4:04
13.	"Runaway" (featuring Earth, Wind & Fire and The Product G&B)	Jean; Duplessis; Maurice White	Jerry 'Wonda' Duplessis	4:56
14.	"Wish You Were Here"	Jean; Duplessis; Roger Waters; David Gilmour	Jerry 'Wonda' Duplessis	4:06
15.	"To All the Girls"	Jean; Al McKay; Albert Hammond; Ben Liebrand; Guy O'Brien; Hal David; Henry Jackson; Maurice White; Michael Wright; Philip Bailey; Sylvia Robinson	Jean	4:18
16.	"Two Wrongs" (featuring Claudette Ortiz)	Jean; Duplessis	Jerry 'Wonda' Duplessis	3:51
17.	"No Woman, No Cry" (with Fugees)	Jean; Vincent Ford	Jerry 'Wonda' Duplessis	4:33

Greatest Hits – Deluxe edition bonus disc
No.	Title	Writer(s)	Producer(s)	Length
1.	"Gone 'Till November" (The Makin' Runs Remix) (featuring Canibus and R. Kelly)	Jean; Duplessis; George O'Dowd; Jon Moss; John Lennon; Paul McCartney; Mikey Craig; Phil Pickett; Roy Hay	Ché Guevara, Jerry 'Wonda' Duplessis	3:33
2.	"Guantanamera" (Roxanne, Roxanne/Oye Como Va Remix) (featuring Beenie Man and Ky-Mani Marley)	Jean; Duplessis; Hill; Seeger; Orbón; Fernández; Martí	Jerry 'Wonda' Duplessis	4:30
3.	"Perfect Gentleman" (Vinyl Remix) (featuring Xzibit & King Yellowman)	Jean; Duplessis; Alvin Joiner	Jerry 'Wonda' Duplessis	4:40
4.	"We Trying to Stay Alive" (Remix) (featuring John Forté and Pras)	Jean; Forté; Michel; B. Gibb; M. Gibb; R. Gibb; Duplessis	Pras Michel	3:31
5.	"It Doesn't Matter" (Remix) (featuring Hope)	Jean; Duplessis; Long; Danoff; Child; Denver; Walters; Rosa; Danoff	Jerry 'Wonda' Duplessis	4:09
6.	"No Woman, No Cry" (Remix) (with Fugees, featuring Steve Marley)	Jean; Ford	Jerry 'Wonda' Duplessis	5:28
7.	"It Doesn't Matter (Ca Ne Me Fait Rien)" (featuring Jacky and Ben-J)	Jean; Duplessis; Fabien Loubayi; Jacky Teixeira; Laurence Tsongo; Onana	Jerry 'Wonda' Duplessis	3:53

Greatest Hits – US edition
No.	Title	Writer(s)	Producer(s)	Length
1.	"Ghetto Religion" (featuring R. Kelly)	Jean; Duplessis; R. Kelly	R. Kelly	3:34
2.	"Hey Girl" (featuring Ayesha and Papa Don)	Jean; Duplessis; Taylor; Patterson	Shea Taylor, Jerry 'Wonda' Duplessis	3:33
3.	"We Trying to Stay Alive" (featuring John Forté and Pras)	Jean; Forté; Michel; B. Gibb; M. Gibb; R. Gibb	Pras Michel	3:11
4.	"It Doesn't Matter" (featuring The Rock and Melky Sedeck)	Jean; Duplessis; Long; Danoff; Child; Denver; Walters; Rosa; Danoff	Jerry 'Wonda' Duplessis	3:57
5.	"Anything Can Happen"	Jean; Duplessis	Jean	4:36
6.	"911" (featuring Mary J. Blige)	Jean; Duplessis	Jerry 'Wonda' Duplessis	4:19
7.	"Two Wrongs" (featuring Claudette Ortiz)	Jean; Duplessis	Jerry 'Wonda' Duplessis	3:51
8.	"Gone 'Till November"	Jean; Duplessis	Jean	3:33
9.	"Knockin' on Heaven's Door"	Jean; Bob Dylan	Jerry 'Wonda' Duplessis	4:04
10.	"Diallo" (featuring Youssou N'Dour & MB²)	Jean; Duplessis	Jerry 'Wonda' Duplessis	7:22
11.	"Something About Mary"	Jean; Duplessis	Jerry 'Wonda' Duplessis	5:20
12.	"Wish You Were Here"	Jean; Duplessis; Waters; Gilmour	Jerry 'Wonda' Duplessis	4:06
13.	"Gone 'Till November" (The Makin' Runs Remix) (featuring Canibus and R. Kelly)	Jean; Duplessis; O'Dowd; Moss; Lennon; McCartney; Craig; Pickett; Hay	Ché Guevara, Jerry 'Wonda' Duplessis	3:33
