= J'ouvert (EP) =

EP by Wyclef Jean
- Released: February 3, 2017
- Recorded: 2016
- Genre: Hip hop
- Length: 33:45
- Labels: Heads Music; E1
- Producers: Wyclef Jean; John "Jube" Altino; Ron "Point 1" Carr; Dj Buttah; Dj Reymo; Nicholas Petricca; Alberto Vaccarino; Branden "Wavie Boi" Washington; Marley Waters

Wyclef Jean chronology
If I Were President: My Haitian Experience (2010)	J'ouvert (2017)	Carnival III: The Fall and Rise of a Refugee (2017)

Singles from J'ouvert
- 1. "Hendrix" Released: June 17, 2016; 2. "If I Was President 2016" Released: October 14, 2016; 3. "I Swear" Released: November 3, 2016; 4. "Life Matters" Released: January 17, 2016; 5. "The Ring" Released: January 27, 2017; 6. "Ne me quitte pas" Released: January 27, 2017; 7. "Holding on the Edge" Released: February 2, 2017; 8. "Little Things" Released: February 8, 2017; 9. "Lady Haiti" Released: June 27, 2017

J'ouvert is an extended play by rapper Wyclef Jean. It was released on February 3, 2017, and features the songs "Hendrix", "If I Was President 2016", "The Ring", and "I Swear".

== Composition ==
Wyclef created the songs for the EP to be a preview for his upcoming album The Carnival Vol. III. Clef also announced that he wanted the EP to be released after Carnival Vol. II: Memoirs of an Immigrant, and reintroduced the character Aya Bungao. He also wanted to release the EP in early 2017, so in the summer he could release The Carnival Vol. III for the 20th anniversary of the album Wyclef Jean Presents The Carnival.

== Singles ==
The first single of the EP is "Hendrix", which was released on June 17, 2016. The song was accompanied by a lyric video, and then a music video. The music video also included another song on the EP, "Life Matters". The second single is "If I Was President 2016", which had a music video released right before the 2016 US election. The third single, "I Swear" featuring Young Thug, had a music video released on December 8, 2016.

"The Ring" Single was released on January 27, 2017, and a music video to accompany it was released on April 11, 2017.

"Ne me quitte pas" was released on January 27, 2017, and a music video to accompany it was released on February 2, 2017.

"Holding Onto the Edge" and "Little Things" are the last two singles of the album. Music videos are yet to be released for them.

On June 27, 2017, a music video for "Lady Haiti" was released.

== Track listing ==
J'ouvert
No.	Title	Writer(s)	Producer(s)	Length
1.	"The Ring"	Wyclef Jeanelle Jean; Madeline Nelson; Branden Washington	Wyclef Jean; Branden "Wavie Boi" Washington	3:38
2.	"I Swear" (featuring Young Thug)	Jean; Nelson; Brendan Waters; Jeffrey Williams; Keithen Foster	DJ Marley Waters	3:39
3.	"Rear View"	Jean; Nelson; Washington	Wyclef Jean; Branden "Wavie Boi" Washington	3:19
4.	"Holding on the Edge" (featuring Walk the Moon)	Jean; Nelson; Nicholas Petricca	Nicholas Petricca	4:11
5.	"Little Things" (featuring T-Baby and Allyson Casado)	Jean; Nelson; Rey Morales; Phillip Fender	Wyclef Jean; DJ Reymo; Alberto Vaccarino (co.)	3:35
6.	"Lady Haiti"	Jean; Nelson	Wyclef Jean; Jube "Papa Jube" Altino (co.); Ron "Point 1" Carr (co.)	3:30
7.	"Party Started" (featuring Farina and Nutron)	Jean; Nelson; Farina Franco; John Altino; Jason Carter	Wyclef Jean; Jube "Papa Jube" Altino; Alberto Vaccarino (co.)	3:42
8.	"Hendrix"	Jean; Nelson	Wyclef Jean; DJ Buttah	3:27
9.	"Life Matters"	Jean; Nelson	Wyclef Jean	2:33
10.	"If I Was President 2016"	Jean; Nelson; Jerry Duplessis	Ron "Point 1" Carr; DJ Matty Kats	2:13

Deluxe edition
No.	Title	Writer(s)	Producer(s)	Length
11.	"Kiss the Sky"	Benjamin Ruttner; James Patterson; Madeline Nelson; Ross Clark; Wyclef Jeanelle Jean	The Knocks; Ryan McMahon	3:23
12.	"I Swear" (acoustic)	Jean; Foster; Nelson; Waters; Williams		2:55
13.	"Hendrix" (acoustic)	Jean; Nelson		3.29
14.	"Ne me quitte pas" (acoustic)			3:48

PledgeMusic deluxe package
No.	Title	Writer(s)	Producer(s)	Length
15.	"Gone Till November" (live)	Jean		6:57
16.	"Divine Sorrow" (featuring Avicii)	Jean; Salem Al Fakir; Tim Bergling; Magnus Lidehäll; Vincent Pontare; Ash Pournouri	Avicii	4:38
17.	"Love, Peace, Happiness" (featuring Lauryn Hill)			5:01
18.	"Killing Me Softly" (acoustic)			4:13
19.	"Ne me quitte pas"			3.50
20.	"Try un Try (Gatta Be)"			4:17

== Charts ==
Chart (2017)	Peak position
Belgian Albums (Ultratop Wallonia)	152
Canadian Albums (Billboard)	50
US Billboard 200	117
US Top R&B/Hip-Hop Albums (Billboard)	48

== See also ==
- J'ouvert
