= Yéle Haiti =

Haiti "charity" founded by Wyclef Jean

Yéle Haiti, also known as Yéle and legally known as the Wyclef Jean Foundation, was a charitable organization established in 2001 by the Haitian musician Wyclef Jean, who was born in Haiti and has kept ties there. The charity was incorporated in the U.S. state of Illinois.

Yéle operated until 2012, when the charity was closed following investigations by the New York Attorney General over financial issues. Yéle had publicized its fundraising to aid victims of the 2010 Haiti earthquake, but by February of that year, The New York Times reported that questions were raised over its finances, and that funds had been used to personally benefit Jean and members of his circle. The charity is subject to suits in Haiti attempting to recover unpaid debts.

== History ==
Yéle Haiti was founded as a charitable organization by Haitian musician and rapper Wyclef Jean. Born in Haiti and immigrating with his family to the United States at age nine, Jean grew up in northern New Jersey and embarked on a successful career in music, first as a member of Fugees and then as a Grammy-winning solo artist. All the while, he has kept family and other ties in Haiti.

In 2004, after Haiti suffered extensive damage in Hurricane Jeanne, Yéle provided scholarships to 3,600 children in Gonaïves, with funding from Comcel telephone service company. Yéle continued to provide scholarships, school funding, meals, and other charitable benefits to citizens of Haiti in the following years.

After the 2010 Haiti earthquake devastated the country and its capital Port-au-Prince, Yéle raised more than $1 million in 24 hours after Jean made a plea on Twitter. The foundation raised additional funds after Jean took part in an MTV donation drive and other publicity efforts to benefit survivors of the earthquake. Together with actor and producer George Clooney, Jean organized the Hope for Haiti Now telethon, which became most watched telethon to date in history. Jean appeared as the last performer on the telethon, singing a medley that ended with Haiti's traditional Rara music. Following the earthquake, Yéle donated funds to orphanages, street cleaning crews, hospitals, and medical clinics. It also organized food service to provide hot meals to refugees and victims.

Not long after Yéle's heavily publicized fundraising efforts, questions were raised beginning in February 2010 about the history and management of the charity. Referring to materials posted during an investigation by the Smoking Gun website, The New York Times reported that Yéle had failed to file required tax returns for 2005, 2006 and 2007 until 2009. It said that by early 2010, returns and records for 2008 had still not been filed with the Internal Revenue Service. The article, which included allegations by the Smoking Gun of mismanagement of funds, also reported criticism of Yéle by its former executive director, Sanjay Rawal. He questioned the foundation's ability to handle large projects and criticized its lack of financial controls. Rawal resigned in 2005.

Between 2005 and 2012, Yéle was managed by Jean (until he resigned after he announced his candidacy in Haiti's 2010 presidential election), co-founder and former chief executive Hugh Locke, and former chief executive Derek Q. Johnson. In August 2012, Johnson resigned and announced the closure of the charity. He said in a statement, "As the foundation's sole remaining employee, my decision implies the closure of the organization as a whole." Johnson's resignation followed an investigation of the charity by New York Attorney General Eric T. Schneiderman, whose office had been conducting settlement talks with Yéle officers over allegations of mismanagement – including improper payments by the charity to Jean, members of his family, and personal acquaintances. A forensic audit conducted by Schneiderman's office disclosed that in 2010, after the earthquake, Yéle had spent more than $9 million, with half of it for travel by Jean and other representatives, as well as salaries and consultants' fees, and expenses related to the charity's offices and warehouse. Yéle, which remains closed, is the subject of lawsuits in Haiti for unpaid debts.
