= New Day (Wyclef Jean song) =

1999 single by Wyclef Jean

Single by Wyclef Jean featuring Bono

from the album The Ecleftic: 2 Sides II a Book and Life soundtrack
- B-side: "Gone 'Till November"
- Released: 14 September 1999
- Genre: Hip hop
- Length: 4:45
- Label: Columbia, Rockland (Life)
- Songwriters: Jerry 'Wonder' Duplessis, Wyclef Jean
- Producers: Jerry 'Wonder' Duplessis, Wyclef Jean, Pras Michel

Wyclef Jean singles chronology
"In the Zone" (1999)	"New Day" (1999)	"It Doesn't Matter" (2000)

"New Day" is a charity single released by Haitian rapper Wyclef Jean and Irish singer-songwriter Bono, in aid of charity NetAid. The song appears on the international version of Jean's second album, The Ecleftic: 2 Sides II a Book. Wyclef and Bono performed the song live at Giants Stadium, New Jersey, at the NetAid launch concert on 9 October 1999.

"New Day" entered the UK Singles Chart at number 23, its highest position, and spent two weeks on the chart. The song also charted in several other countries, finding its highest peak in Italy at number two. The remix of the track features contributions from Bumpy Knuckles, Marie Antoinette, DJ Red Alert, Reptile and Small World. The song was featured on the soundtrack to the 1999 film Life, starring Eddie Murphy and Martin Lawrence, and featured jazz saxophonist Kenny G.

== Track listings ==
UK CD1 (668212 2)

1. "New Day" (Pop Radio Edit) (Feat. Bono) - 4:33
2. "Gone Till November" - 3:29
3. "Cheated" (R&B Remix) (Feat. Queen Pen and The Product) - 4:05

UK CD2 (668212 5)

1. "New Day" (Pop Radio Edit) (Feat. Bono) - 4:33
2. "New Day" (Hip Hop Clean Version) (Feat. The Refugee Camp) - 3:57
3. "New Day" (Reggae Remix) - 3:45

== Charts ==
=== Weekly charts ===
Weekly chart performance for "New Day"
Chart (1999)	Peak position
Belgium (Ultratip Bubbling Under Flanders)	8
Canada (Nielsen SoundScan)	10
Finland (Suomen virallinen lista)	13
Germany (GfK)	72
Iceland (Íslenski Listinn Topp 40)	3
Ireland (IRMA)	12
Italy (Musica e dischi)	2
Netherlands (Dutch Top 40)	23
Netherlands (Single Top 100)	28
Scotland Singles (OCC)	21
Switzerland (Schweizer Hitparade)	48
UK Singles (OCC)	23

=== Year-end charts ===
Year-end chart performance for "New Day"
Chart (1999)	Position
Netherlands (Dutch Top 40)	187

== Release history ==
Release dates for "New Day"
Region	Date	Format(s)	Label(s)	Ref.
United States	14 September 1999	Urban radio	Columbia	
United States	21 September 1999	Rhythmic contemporary radio	Columbia	
United Kingdom	11 October 1999	CD; cassette	Columbia	
Japan	3 November 1999	CD	SME	
