= Life (soundtrack) =

Soundtrack album to Life by various artists
- Released: March 16, 1999
- Genre: R&B; hip-hop
- Length: 1:03:14
- Label: Rock Land; Interscope
- Producer: Jerry Duplessis; R. Kelly; Wyclef Jean

Singles from Life
- 1. "Life" Released: January 26, 1999; 2. "Fortunate" Released: March 3, 1999; 3. "New Day" Released: September 14, 1999; 4. "It's Gonna Rain" Released: 1999

Professional ratings
Review scores
Source	Rating
AllMusic	3/5 stars

Music Inspired by the Motion Pitcure Life is the soundtrack album to the Ted Demme's 1999 film Life. It was released on March 16, 1999, through Rock Land/Interscope Records. Production was handled by R. Kelly, Wyclef Jean and Jerry Duplessis. It features contributions from Brian McKnight, City High, Destiny's Child, DJ Quik, Free Marie, Ja Rule, Juvenile, K-Ci & JoJo, Kelly Price, Khadejia, Maxwell, Mocha, Mýa, Nature, Reptile, R. Kelly, Sparkle, Talent, The Isley Brothers, Trisha Yearwood, Vegas Cats, Wyclef Jean and Xzibit.

The album peaked at number 10 on the Billboard 200 and number 2 on the Top R&B/Hip-Hop Albums charts in the United States. It received a Platinum certification by the Recording Industry Association of America on June 18, 1999 for selling 1,000,000 copies in the US alone.

It spawned the hit single "Fortunate", which peaked at No. 4 on the Billboard Hot 100 and was certified gold by the RIAA on June 2 that same year. "What Would You Do?" would go on to chart in 2001. A version of the classic Harold Melvin & the Blue Notes song "Wake Up Everybody" plays during the film's opening credits.

== Track listing ==
No.	Title	Writer(s)	Producer(s)	Length
1.	"25 to Life" (performed by Xzibit, Juvenile, Nature, Ja Rule and Reptile)	Alvin Joiner; Terius Grey; Jermaine Baxter; Jeffrey Atkins; Holking Brice; Nelust Wyclef Jean; Jerry Duplessis; Albert Johnson; Kejuan Muchita	Wyclef Jean; Jerry "Wonder" Duplessis	4:03
2.	"It's Like Everyday" (performed by DJ Quik and R. Kelly)	David Marvin Blake; Robert Kelly; Johnny Burns	R. Kelly; G-One (co.)	4:26
3.	"Stimulate Me" (performed by Destiny's Child and Mocha)	Aleesha Richards; Kelly	R. Kelly	4:13
4.	"Fortunate" (performed by Maxwell)	Kelly	R. Kelly	4:59
5.	"Lovin' You (The Remix)" (performed by Sparkle)	Minnie Riperton; Richard Rudolph	Wyclef Jean; Jerry "Wonder" Duplessis	3:57
6.	"Every Which Way" (performed by Talent and Vegas Cats)	Kelly; R. Hamilton; S. Sledge	Rodney Jerkins; R. Kelly	4:05
7.	"It's Gonna Rain" (performed by Kelly Price)	Kelly	R. Kelly	4:02
8.	"Discovery" (performed by Brian McKnight)	Kelly	R. Kelly	4:19
9.	"Follow the Wind" (performed by Trisha Yearwood)	Kelly	R. Kelly	4:28
10.	"Why Should I Believe You?" (performed by Mýa)	Kelly	R. Kelly	4:09
11.	"What Would You Do?" (performed by City High)	Robbie Pardlo; Ryan Toby	Wyclef Jean; Jerry "Wonder" Duplessis; Robby (co.); Ryan Toby (co.)	3:32
12.	"What Goes Around" (performed by Khadejia and Marie Antoinette)	Khadejia Bass; Marie Wright; Jean; Duplessis	Wyclef Jean; Jerry "Wonder" Duplessis	4:27
13.	"Speechless" (performed by The Isley Brothers)	Kelly	R. Kelly	4:52
14.	"Life" (performed by K-Ci & JoJo)	Kelly	R. Kelly	3:43
15.	"New Day" (performed by Wyclef Jean)	Jean; Duplessis	Wyclef Jean; Jerry "Wonder" Duplessis	3:59
Total length:				1:03:14

== Charts ==
=== Weekly charts ===
Chart (1999)	Peak position
US Billboard 200	10
US Top R&B/Hip-Hop Albums (Billboard)	2

=== Year-end charts ===
Chart (1999)	Position
US Billboard 200 Albums	107
US Top R&B/Hip-Hop Albums (Billboard)	19

== Certifications ==
Region	Certification	Certified units/sales
United States (RIAA)	Platinum	1,000,000^{^}
^{^} Shipments figures based on certification alone.
