= Two Wrongs =

2002 single by Wyclef Jean

Single by Wyclef Jean featuring Claudette Ortiz

from the album Masquerade
- B-side: "Masquerade"; "Africa"; "PJ's"
- Released: 13 May 2002
- Length: 3:49
- Label: Columbia
- Songwriters: Jerry "Wonder" Duplessis; Wyclef Jean
- Producers: Jerry "Wonder" Duplessis; Wyclef Jean

Wyclef Jean singles chronology
"Wish You Were Here" (2001)	"Two Wrongs" (2002)	"Pussycat" (2002)

"Two Wrongs" is the lead single from Haitian rapper Wyclef Jean's third studio album, Masquerade. The song, released in the United States on 13 May 2002, features Claudette Ortiz of American hip hop group City High. The single reached number one in New Zealand, number five in Australia, and number 14 in the United Kingdom. In the United States, it reached number 28 on the Billboard Hot 100 and number 11 on the Billboard Hot R&B/Hip-Hop Singles & Tracks chart. "Two Wrongs" is certified platinum in Australia and double platinum New Zealand.

== Track listings ==
US CD single

1. "Two Wrongs" (album version) – 3:50
2. "Two Wrongs" (instrumental) – 3:50

US 12-inch single

A1. "Two Wrongs" (album version) – 3:50
A2. "Two Wrongs" (instrumental) – 3:50
A3. "Two Wrongs" (a cappella) – 3:45
B1. "Masquerade" (clean version) – 4:01
B2. "Masquerade" (instrumental) – 4:01

UK CD single

1. "Two Wrongs" (album version) – 3:50
2. "Africa" – 6:46
3. "PJ's" (main) – 3:53
4. "Two Wrongs" (video version)

European CD single

1. "Two Wrongs" (album version) – 3:50
2. "Africa" (album version) – 6:46

European 12-inch single

A1. "Two Wrongs" (album version) – 3:50
A2. "Ghetto Racine" (PJ's Creole mix) – 5:27
B1. "PJ's" (main) – 3:53
B2. "Two Wrongs" (instrumental) – 3:50

European maxi-CD single

1. "Two Wrongs" (album version) – 3:50
2. "Africa" (album version) – 6:46
3. "PJ's" (main) – 3:53
4. "Ghetto Racine" (PJ's Creole mix) – 5:27
5. "Two Wrongs" (video version)

Australian CD single

1. "Two Wrongs" (album version) – 3:50
2. "PJ's" – 3:53
3. "911" (live version) – 4:23
4. "No Woman, No Cry" (by Fugees) – 5:46
5. "Perfect Gentleman" – 4:09

== Charts ==
=== Weekly charts ===
Chart (2002)	Peak position
Australia (ARIA)	5
Australian Urban (ARIA)	1
Austria (Ö3 Austria Top 40)	58
Europe (Eurochart Hot 100)	39
France (SNEP)	88
Germany (GfK)	54
Hungary (Single Top 40)	20
Ireland (IRMA)	29
Netherlands (Dutch Top 40)	38
Netherlands (Single Top 100)	32
New Zealand (Recorded Music NZ)	1
Norway (VG-lista)	13
Romania (Romanian Top 100)	56
Scotland Singles (OCC)	25
Sweden (Sverigetopplistan)	16
Switzerland (Schweizer Hitparade)	30
UK Singles (OCC)	14
UK Hip Hop/R&B (OCC)	4
US Billboard Hot 100	28
US Hot R&B/Hip-Hop Songs (Billboard)	11
US Rhythmic Airplay (Billboard)	25

=== Year-end charts ===
Chart (2002)	Position
Australia (ARIA)	37
Australian Urban (ARIA)	10
New Zealand (RIANZ)	25
Sweden (Hitlistan)	89
US Hot R&B/Hip-Hop Singles & Tracks (Billboard)	58

== Certifications ==
Region	Certification	Certified units/sales
Australia (ARIA)	Platinum	70,000^{^}
New Zealand (RMNZ)	2× Platinum	60,000^{‡}
^{^} Shipments figures based on certification alone.^{‡} Sales+streaming figures based on certification alone.

== Release history ==
Region	Date	Format(s)	Label(s)	Ref.
United States	13 May 2002	Rhythmic contemporary radio	Columbia	
Europe	3 June 2002	12-inch vinyl; CD	Columbia	
United Kingdom	24 June 2002	CD; cassette	Columbia	
Australia	8 July 2002	CD	Columbia	
United States	8 July 2002	Contemporary hit radio	Columbia	
