= It Doesn't Matter (song) =

2000 single by Wyclef Jean featuring the Rock and Melky Sedeck

Single by Wyclef Jean featuring The Rock and Melky Sedeck

from the album The Ecleftic: 2 Sides II a Book
- B-side: "However You Want It"
- Released: 26 June 2000
- Studio: The Hit Factory (New York City)
- Length: 3:57
- Label: Columbia
- Songwriter(s): Wyclef Jean; Jerry Duplessis; Ricky Walters; Andrew Long; Desmond Child; Robi Rosa; Taffy Danoff; William Danoff; John Denver
- Producer(s): Wyclef Jean; Jerry "Wonder" Duplessis

Wyclef Jean singles chronology
"New Day" (1999)	"It Doesn't Matter" (2000)	"911" (2000)

Music video
- "It Doesn't Matter" on YouTube

"It Doesn't Matter" is the first single released from Haitian rapper Wyclef Jean's second studio album, The Ecleftic: 2 Sides II a Book (2000). Written by Jean and Jerry Duplessis, the track features additional vocals from Melky Sedeck and wrestler The Rock, whose famous catchphrase inspired the song title. The song includes samples of "Mona Lisa" by Slick Rick, "This Is Ska" by Longsy D, "Livin' la Vida Loca" by Ricky Martin, and "Take Me Home, Country Roads" by John Denver, so all songwriters are given credits.

Upon its release on 26 June 2000, the song reached number 80 on the US Billboard Hot R&B/Hip-Hop Singles & Tracks chart. In September 2000, the song entered the UK Singles Chart at number three and spent 11 weeks in the top 100. "It Doesn't Matter" was also released in French under the title "Ça ne me fait rien" for Quebec and French radio stations, with Jacky and Ben-J providing additional vocals. Some lyrics were changed for this version.

== Track listings ==
US 12-inch single

A1. "It Doesn't Matter" (LP version featuring The Rock and Melky Sedeck) – 4:02
A2. "It Doesn't Matter" (instrumental) – 3:56
A3. "It Doesn't Matter" (a cappella featuring The Rock and Melky Sedeck) – 3:50
B1. "It Doesn't Matter" (remix featuring Hope) – 4:05
B2. "It Doesn't Matter" (remix instrumental) – 4:05
B3. "It Doesn't Matter" (remix a cappella featuring Hope) – 3:20
B4. "However You Want It" (LP version) – 3:03

UK CD1

1. "It Doesn't Matter" (LP version featuring The Rock and Melky Sedeck) – 3:57
2. "It Doesn't Matter" (remix featuring Hope) – 4:05
3. "Thug Angels" (LP version featuring Small World) – 6:35

UK CD2

1. "It Doesn't Matter" (LP version featuring The Rock and Melky Sedeck) – 3:57
2. "We Trying to Stay Alive" (LP version) – 3:09
3. "Younger Days" – 5:00

UK cassette single and European CD single

1. "It Doesn't Matter" (LP version featuring The Rock and Melky Sedeck) – 3:57
2. "It Doesn't Matter" (remix featuring Hope) – 4:05

European maxi-CD single

1. "It Doesn't Matter" (LP version featuring The Rock and Melky Sedeck) – 4:02
2. "It Doesn't Matter" (remix featuring Hope) – 4:05
3. "It Doesn't Matter" (instrumental) – 3:56
4. "However You Want It" (LP version) – 3:03

French CD single

1. "It Doesn't Matter" (LP version featuring the Rock and Melky Sedeck) – 4:02
2. "It Doesn't Matter" (remix featuring Hope) – 4:05
3. "Ça ne me fait rien" – 3:59

== Credits and personnel ==
Credits and personnel are taken from The Ecleftic: 2 Sides II a Book album booklet.

Studios

- Recorded and mixed at The Hit Factory (New York City)
- Mastered at Sterling Sound (New York City)

Personnel

- Wyclef Jean – writing, vocals, production
- Jerry "Wonder" Duplessis – writing (as Jerry Duplessis), production
- Ricky Walters – writing ("Mona Lisa")
- Andrew Long – writing ("This Is Ska")
- Desmond Child – writing ("Livin' la Vida Loca")
- Robi Rosa – writing ("Livin' la Vida Loca")
- Taffy Danoff – writing ("Take Me Home, Country Roads")
- William Danoff – writing ("Take Me Home, Country Roads")
- John Denver – writing ("Take Me Home, Country Roads")
- The Rock – featured vocals
- Melky Sedeck – featured vocals
  - Blandinna Melky Jean – vocals
  - Farel Sedeck Guerschom Jean – co-production
- Robert Aaron – horns
- Andy Grassi – mixing, recording engineer, mastering
- Glen Marchese – recording engineer
- Chris Gehringer – mastering
- Serge "Sergical" Tsai – mastering

== Charts ==
=== Weekly charts ===
Chart (2000)	Peak position
Canada (Nielsen SoundScan)	8
Europe (Eurochart Hot 100)	13
France (SNEP)	63
Germany (GfK)	47
Ireland (IRMA)	9
Netherlands (Dutch Top 40)	34
Netherlands (Single Top 100)	58
Scotland (OCC)	4
Switzerland (Schweizer Hitparade)	58
UK Singles (OCC)	3
UK Hip Hop/R&B (OCC)	1
US Hot R&B/Hip-Hop Songs (Billboard)	80
US Hot Rap Songs (Billboard)	25

=== Year-end charts ===
Chart (2000)	Position
Ireland (IRMA)	97
UK Singles (OCC)	120

== Release history ==
Region	Date	Format(s)	Label(s)	Ref.
United States	26 June 2000	Urban radio	Columbia	
United States	27 June 2000	Rhythmic contemporary; contemporary hit radio	Columbia	
United Kingdom	4 September 2000	CD; cassette	Columbia	
