= Wish You Were Here (Pink Floyd song) =

1975 song by Pink Floyd

Song by Pink Floyd

from the album Wish You Were Here
- Released: 12 September 1975
- Recorded: January–July 1975
- Studio: Abbey Road, London
- Genre: Progressive rock; folk rock
- Length: 5:35 (album version); 5:21 (Echoes: The Best of Pink Floyd version)
- Label: Harvest (UK); Columbia/CBS (US)
- Songwriters: David Gilmour; Roger Waters
- Producer: Pink Floyd

"Wish You Were Here" is a song by English rock band Pink Floyd, released as the title track of their 1975 album of the same name. Guitarist/vocalist David Gilmour and bassist/vocalist Roger Waters collaborated in writing the music, with Gilmour singing lead vocals.

The song is popular on classic rock radio stations and remains a staple of Pink Floyd's discography. It was voted the 18th best rock song of all time by listeners of New York City’s Q104.3, and ranked No. 302 on Rolling Stone's "500 Greatest Songs of All Time", both in 2021. Billboard and Louder Sound ranked the song number one and number three, respectively, on their lists of the 50 greatest Pink Floyd songs.

== Composition ==
In the original album version, the song segues from "Have a Cigar" as if a radio had been tuned away from one station, through several others (including a radio play and one playing the opening of the finale of Pyotr Ilyich Tchaikovsky's Fourth Symphony), and finally to a new station where "Wish You Were Here" is beginning. The radio was recorded from Gilmour's car radio. He performed the intro on a twelve-string guitar, processed to sound like it was playing through an AM radio, and then overdubbed a fuller-sounding acoustic guitar solo. This passage was mixed to sound as though a guitarist were listening to the radio and playing along. As the acoustic part becomes more complex, the "radio broadcast" fades away and Gilmour's voice enters, while the rest of the band joins in.

The intro riff is repeated several times before Gilmour sings the first verse and is then joined by the full band. A second verse, bridge, and third verse follow, featuring an increasingly expressive vocal from Gilmour and audible backing vocals. At the end of the recorded song, the final solo transitions to a light, high scat singing that crossfades into wind sound effects, and finally segues into the second section of the multi-part suite "Shine On You Crazy Diamond".

Lyrically, the song is often considered to be a direct tribute to Syd Barrett. However, on the documentary The Story of Wish You Were Here, Gilmour and Waters separately describe the original concept that differs from this interpretation. Waters, who mainly wrote the lyrics complementing Gilmour's initial riff idea and subsequent joint composition, describes the lyrics as being directed at himself. Gilmour, on the other hand, recognises that he never performs the song without remembering Syd Barrett. Waters later adds that the song is nevertheless open to interpretation.

Both Gilmour and Waters have praised the song as one of Pink Floyd's finest. Waters has noted that the collaboration between himself and Gilmour on the song was "really good. All bits of it are really, really good. I'm very happy about it." Gilmour has playfully called "Wish You Were Here" "a very simple country song" and stated that "because of its resonance and the emotional weight it carries, it is one of our best songs."

== Recording ==
"Wish You Were Here" was recorded at Abbey Road Studios, as part of the sessions for the entire album.

A noted part of the song was a planned contribution by Stéphane Grappelli. A jazz violinist popular at the time and well known for his collaborations with Yehudi Menuhin, both violinists were recording in a downstairs studio at Abbey Road at the time. Gilmour had suggested that there be a little "country fiddle" at the end of the song and invited them to participate. Grappelli duly obliged (Menuhin declined) on arranging a session fee of £300, equivalent to £2,300 in 2025. Ultimately during mixing it was decided to almost remove his contribution, although it can just be heard around 5:21. According to Waters it was decided that it would be insulting to credit Grappelli in the sleeve notes for something so inaudible, although he did receive the agreed-upon fee.

In the introduction, Gilmour can be heard drinking, coughing, and breathing heavily before the main guitar begins. It is commonly believed that he could not hold the cough due to his smoking habit, and his disappointment with the final recording led him to quit smoking cold turkey. However, the musician later debunked this claim, stating that he never smoked.

As part of the Why Pink Floyd...? campaign, the Experience and Immersion versions of the Wish You Were Here album include an alternative version of the song where Grappelli's part is heard in the instrumental break after the second verse and throughout the third verse before a considerably extended outro. Other less obvious differences are audible, for example, at the section leading into the second verse.

== Live performances ==
In 2005, Waters and Eric Clapton performed the song at the Tsunami Aid concert, and in 2005's Live 8, Waters rejoined his former bandmates in London to perform it, along with four other classic Pink Floyd songs. Waters and Gilmour shared lead vocals.

On 13 December 2014, Gilmour was a guest performer at a concert by the Bombay Bicycle Club at Earls Court Arena, their concert being the final event ever to take place there before its demolition. Band member Jamie MacColl introduced Gilmour, saying, "This man gave me my first guitar and was one of the first people to play this venue and by my count has played here more than 27 times." Gilmour then played with the band on their song "Rinse Me Down" before a performance of "Wish You Were Here".

== Other versions by Pink Floyd ==
"Wish You Were Here" appeared as the fifth track on A Collection of Great Dance Songs in 1981 (with the radio intro following the end of a heavily edited "Shine On You Crazy Diamond") and as the 23rd track on the Echoes compilation in 2001 (with the radio intro following "Arnold Layne", and at the end crossfading with "Jugband Blues").

A live recording included on the 1995 live album Pulse was issued as a single/EP. Its intro replicates the sound of the original, semi-ambient intro. The cover of the EP features a man and a woman whose faces are distorted by fish bowls, referring to the line "We're just two lost souls swimming in a fish bowl, year after year".

The Experience edition of Wish You Were Here from the 2011 Why Pink Floyd...? re-release campaign includes a version of "Wish You Were Here" featuring Stéphane Grappelli on violin much more prominently. The recording of Grappelli, which Mason had thought he might have recorded over in subsequent sessions for "Wish You Were Here", was uncovered in the EMI vaults during re-mastering work for the Why Pink Floyd...? campaign. Mason discussed the alternative version on the BBC Radio 4 Front Row programme, and revealed that Yehudi Menuhin, who was recording with Grappelli in Abbey Road's Studio Two, was also invited to play on "Wish You Were Here" but declined, as he was not as comfortable as Grappelli at improvising.

The 2025 Wish You Were Here 50 box set, released to commemorate the 50th anniversary of the Wish You Were Here album's release, includes a previously unreleased pedal steel instrumental mix of "Wish You Were Here".

== Personnel ==
Pink Floyd

- David Gilmour – lead and harmony vocals, scat singing, six and twelve-string acoustic guitars, pedal steel guitar, tape effects
- Nick Mason – drums, tape effects
- Roger Waters – bass, tape effects
- Richard Wright – Steinway piano, Minimoog

Additional musicians

- Stéphane Grappelli – violin improvisation

== Charts ==
Chart (2007)	Peak position
Norway (VG-lista)	18

Chart (2012)	Peak position
Austria (Ö3 Austria Top 40)	48
France (SNEP)	192
Germany (Media Control AG)	67
UK Singles (Official Charts)	68

== Certifications ==
Region	Certification	Certified units/sales
Denmark (IFPI Danmark)	Platinum	90,000^{‡}
Italy (FIMI)	2× Platinum	100,000^{‡}
New Zealand (RMNZ)	6× Platinum	180,000^{‡}
Spain (Promusicae)	Platinum	60,000^{‡}
United Kingdom (BPI)	2× Platinum	1,200,000^{‡}
^{‡} Sales+streaming figures based on certification alone.

== "Wish You Were Here" (live) ==
"Wish You Were Here (live)"

Single by Pink Floyd

from the album Pulse
- B-side: "Coming Back to Life" (live); "Keep Talking" (live)
- Released: 20 July 1995
- Recorded: 20 September 1994
- Venue: Cinecittà, Rome
- Genre: Progressive rock; folk rock
- Label: Columbia (US); EMI (UK)
- Producers: James Guthrie; David Gilmour

Pink Floyd singles chronology
"High Hopes" / "Keep Talking" (1994)	"Wish You Were Here (live)" (1995)	"Proper Education" (2007)

Pink Floyd recorded a live version of "Wish You Were Here" for their third live album, Pulse. It was released as a single on 20 July 1995 in the United Kingdom and Europe, notably the last single released by the band until October 2014.

=== Track listings ===
CD
No.	Title	Length
1.	"Wish You Were Here (Live)"	5:40
2.	"Coming Back to Life (Live)"	6:40

CD Maxi
No.	Title	Length
1.	"Wish You Were Here (Live)"	5:40
2.	"Coming Back to Life (Live)"	6:40
3.	"Keep Talking (Live)"	6:54

=== Charts ===
Chart (1995)	Peak position
US Album Rock Tracks (Billboard)	13

=== Release history ===
Region	Date	Format	Label	Catalog no.
Netherlands	20 July 1995	CD-R (Contemporary hit radio); CD; CD (maxi)	EMI	PFSING1 (CD-R); 724388220828 (CD); 7243 8 82207 2 9 (CD maxi)
United Kingdom	20 July 1995	CD; CD maxi	EMI	724388220828 (CD); 7243 8 82207 2 9 (CD maxi)

== Wyclef Jean version ==
"Wish You Were Here"

Single by Wyclef Jean

from the album The Ecleftic: 2 Sides II a Book
- B-side: "No Woman, No Cry"; "911" (live); "Perfect Gentleman"
- Released: 26 November 2001
- Length: 4:06
- Label: Columbia
- Songwriters: David Gilmour; Roger Waters; Jerry 'Wonder' Duplessis; Wyclef Jean
- Producers: Jerry 'Wonder' Duplessis; Wyclef Jean

Wyclef Jean singles chronology
"Perfect Gentleman" (2001)	"Wish You Were Here" (2001)	"Two Wrongs" (2002)

"Wish You Were Here" served as the fourth and final single from Haitian rapper Wyclef Jean's second studio album, The Ecleftic: 2 Sides II a Book (2000). It was released on 26 November 2001, peaking at number 28 on the UK Singles Chart and reaching the top 50 in Germany, Ireland, Norway, and Switzerland.

=== Track listings ===
UK CD single

1. "Wish You Were Here" (radio edit) – 4:04
2. "No Woman, No Cry" (album version) – 4:33
3. "911" (live) – 4:23
4. "Wish You Were Here" (video)

UK cassette single

1. "Wish You Were Here" (LP version) – 4:08
2. "Perfect Gentleman" (remix radio edit) – 3:59

European CD single

1. "Wish You Were Here" (radio edit) – 4:04
2. "911" (live) – 4:23

=== Charts ===
Chart (2001–2002)	Peak position
Austria (Ö3 Austria Top 40)	51
Europe (Eurochart Hot 100)	87
Germany (GfK)	40
Ireland (IRMA)	38
Netherlands (Dutch Top 40 Tipparade)	13
Netherlands (Single Top 100)	100
Norway (VG-lista)	19
Scottish Singles Sales (Official Charts)	25
Switzerland (Schweizer Hitparade)	49
UK Singles (Official Charts)	28
UK Hip Hop/R&B (Official Charts)	14

== Other cover versions ==
- In 2001, American nu metal band Limp Bizkit and John Rzeznik of the American rock band Goo Goo Dolls covered the song at the America: A Tribute to Heroes 9/11 benefit concert.
- In 2010, American indie rock band The Antlers covered the song for the first season of The A.V. Club's A.V. Undercover web series.
- Canadian Inuk artist Elisapie translated the song into Inuktitut and covered it on her 2023 album Inuktitut. The album features a series of interpretations of personally meaningful popular songs, all translated into Inuktitut.
- In 2026, South Korean girl group Fifty Fifty released a video cover of the song, which garnered two million views on YouTube before an audio version was released on streaming platforms.

== See also ==
- Vegetable Man
