= If I Were President: My Haitian Experience =

EP by Wyclef Jean
- Released: December 3, 2010
- Recorded: 2010
- Genre: R&B, hip hop, reggae fusion, political hip hop
- Length: 24:12
- Label: Columbia, Sony Music
- Producer: Wyclef Jean

Wyclef Jean chronology
From the Hut, To the Projects, To the Mansion (2009)	If I Were President: My Haitian Experience (2010)	J'ouvert (2017)

Singles from If I Were President: My Haitian Experience
- 1. "Election Time" Released: November 5, 2010

If I Were President: My Haitian Experience is a 2010 political hip-hop EP released by Haitian rapper and songwriter Wyclef Jean. The EP was released exclusively via iTunes on December 3, 2010.

== Background ==
Following the announcement that Jean was to record new material for a forthcoming album, work on the record began in September 2009, following the release of his seventh album, From the Hut, To the Projects, To the Mansion. Originally billed for release in the first quarter of 2010, the record was put on hold due to Jean's political commitments. It was feared for sometime that the album would be cancelled due to Jean's battle to become president of Haiti, however, after he was forced to back out of the race, he announced via his blog that work on new material was ongoing. In September 2010, it was announced that following treatment for exhaustion, Jean had decided to release a six-track E.P. of his completed work rather than a full studio album. On October 23, Jean unveiled two brand new tracks that were to appear on the E.P. In December 2010, it was announced that the E.P. would receive an exclusive digital release.

== Track listing ==
All tracks written and produced by Wyclef Jean.

No.	Title	Length
1.	"Haitian Experience"	5:42
2.	"Earthquake"	4:17
3.	"Election Time"	4:10
4.	"Death Threats"	4:37
5.	"Prison For The K"	3:50
6.	"Election Time" (Video)	4:39
