= From the Hut, to the Projects, to the Mansion =

Studio album by Wyclef Jean
- Released: November 10, 2009
- Recorded: 2008–2009
- Length: 56:34
- Label: Carnival House
- Producer: Jerry 'Wonda' Duplessis; The Runners; Timbaland

Wyclef Jean chronology
| Carnival Vol. II: Memoirs of an Immigrant (2007) | From the Hut, to the Projects, to the Mansion (2009) | If I Were President: The Haitian Experience (2010) |

Singles from From the Hut, to the Projects, to the Mansion
- 1. "Warrior's Anthem" Released: October 13, 2009; 2. "You Don't Wanna Go Outside" Released: November 3, 2009

Professional ratings
Review scores
| Source | Rating |
|---|---|
| Allmusic | 3.5/5 stars |
| RapReviews | 8.5/10 |

From the Hut, to the Projects, to the Mansion is a concept album released by Haitian rapper Wyclef Jean, released on November 10, 2009. The album, Jean's seventh overall, is a collaboration with disc jockey DJ Drama, which tells the story of the fictional character Toussaint St. Jean, who is based on the 18th century Haitian revolutionary Toussaint L'Ouverture. The album, which was co-produced by Jean and long-term collaborator Jerry 'Wonda' Duplessis, contains guest appearances from Timbaland, Eve, Cyndi Lauper and Lil' Kim, and production from The Runners.

Two singles were released from the album: "Warrior's Anthem", released on October 13, and "You Don't Wanna Go Outside", featuring Maino, released on November 3. "We Made It" and "More Bottles", featuring Timbaland were also released as instant grat downloads following the purchase of the parent album from Wyclef's official store.

== Track listing ==
From the Hut, to the Projects, to the Mansion track listing
| No. | Title | Writer(s) | Producer(s) | Length |
|---|---|---|---|---|
| 1. | "From the Hut, to the Projects, to the Mansion" (Interlude) | Wyclef Jean | Jerry "Wonda" Duplessis | 1:02 |
| 2. | "Warrior's Anthem" | Jean; Jerry Duplessis | Jerry "Wonda" Duplessis | 4:39 |
| 3. | "The Streets Pronounce Me Dead" | Jean; Duplessis; Mack Loggins; Tyree Simmons | Jerry "Wonda" Duplessis | 4:20 |
| 4. | "Slumdog Millionaire" (featuring Luscious Loo Loo) | Jean; Duplessis; Cyndi Lauper | Jerry "Wonda" Duplessis | 3:50 |
| 5. | "Every Now & Then" (Interlude) | Jean | Jerry "Wonda" Duplessis | 0:51 |
| 6. | "Walk Away" | Jean; Duplessis; Simmons; Bunny Sigler; Phil Hurtt; Kazumi Tabata | Jerry "Wonda" Duplessis | 4:07 |
| 7. | "More Bottles" (featuring Timbaland) | Jean; Duplessis; Winston Foster; Henry "Junjo" Lawes; Timothy Mosley | Timbaland | 4:13 |
| 8. | "You Don't Wanna Go Outside" (featuring Maino) | Jean; Duplessis; Jim Jonsin | Jerry "Wonda" Duplessis | 4:20 |
| 9. | "Toussaint vs. Bishop" | Jean; Jerry Duplessis; Keith Duplessis | Jerry "Wonda" Duplessis | 3:08 |
| 10. | "The Struggle" (Interlude) | Jean | Jerry "Wonda" Duplessis | 0:31 |
| 11. | "We Made It" | Jean; Jermaine Jackson; Andrew Harr | The Runners | 4:08 |
| 12. | "Suicide Love" (featuring Eve) | Jean; Duplessis; Eve Jeffers-Cooper | Jerry "Wonda" Duplessis | 4:02 |
| 13. | "Letter from the Penn" | Jean; Duplessis; Loggins; Simmons | Jerry "Wonda" Duplessis | 3:44 |
| 14. | "Robotic Love" | Jean; DeWayne Turrentine, Jr. | Jerry "Wonda" Duplessis | 5:38 |
| 15. | "Gangsta Girl" (featuring Lil' Kim) | Jean; Devon | Jerry "Wonda" Duplessis | 3:51 |
| 16. | "Tell the Kids the Truth" (Interlude) | Jean | Jerry "Wonda" Duplessis | 0:53 |
| 17. | "The Shottas" | Jean; Duplessis | Jerry "Wonda" Duplessis | 3:12 |

== Chart performance ==
Chart performance for From the Hut, to the Projects, to the Mansion
| Chart (2009) | Peak position |
|---|---|
| US Independent Albums (Billboard) | 21 |
| US Top R&B/Hip-Hop Albums (Billboard) | 36 |
