= Tony Matterhorn =

- Born: 13 March 1972 (age 53); Kingston, Jamaica
- Occupations: Musician, songwriter, deejay
- Years active: 1992–present
- Website: https://twitter.com/tonymatterhorn

Tony Matterhorn (born Dufton Lafton Taylor on 13 March 1972) is a dancehall reggae deejay and sound system selector from Kingston, Jamaica.

Matterhorn got his start in the sound system arena in the early 1990s, on Inner City Sound System first, then landing on King Addies in Brooklyn, New York alongside selector Babyface. After leaving Addies in 1998 to form his own sound, he went on to win several international clashes, including World Clash Jamaica and the UK Cup Clash.

Tony Matterhorn eventually crossed over into deejaying, and his Dutty Wine became both a hit single and a controversial dance craze in 2006. Matterhorn continues to record and tour, as both a deejay and soundman.

The nickname "Tony Matterhorn" comes from Matterhorn, a brand of cigarettes sold in Jamaica.
