= Perfect Gentleman (Wyclef Jean song) =

2001 single by Wyclef Jean

Single by Wyclef Jean

from the album The Ecleftic: 2 Sides II a Book
- Released: 30 January 2001
- Studio: The Hit Factory (New York City)
- Genre: Symphonic pop; Miami bass
- Length: 4:09
- Label: Columbia
- Songwriters: Wyclef Jean; Jerry Duplessis; Hope Harris
- Producers: Wyclef Jean; Jerry "Wonder" Duplessis

Wyclef Jean singles chronology
| "911" (2000) | "Perfect Gentleman" (2001) | "Wish You Were Here" (2001) |

"Perfect Gentleman" is the third single released from Haitian rapper Wyclef Jean's second studio album, The Ecleftic: 2 Sides II a Book. It features a guest verse by rapper and co-writer Hope Harris. The song cites Chris Rock's spoken-word piece "No Sex (In the Champagne Room)".

"Perfect Gentleman" was released in the United States on 30 January 2001 and reached number 21 on the Billboard Rhythmic Top 40 chart; it failed to chart on the Billboard Hot 100. Internationally, the song peaked within the top 10 in Denmark, Germany, Ireland, Norway, Sweden, and the United Kingdom. In the UK, the song was certified platinum by the British Phonographic Industry (BPI).

== Commercial performance ==
In the United Kingdom, "Perfect Gentleman" peaked at number four on the UK Singles Chart and spent a total of 20 weeks on the chart. In 2013, the song re-appeared on the chart at number 70. In December 2017, the single was certified platinum by the BPI, denoting sales and streams of 600,000 units in Britain. The song is certified gold in Sweden—where it reached number four as well—and in New Zealand, where it peaked at number 34.

== Music video ==
The music video was shot in Washington, D.C., and features a scene outside The White House. The video shows Wyclef Jean in a large ballroom, performing the song to the crowd. It later features Jean as a college dean, outlining his plans for being the Perfect Gentleman. Harry Tait makes a guest appearance in the video.

== Track listings ==
UK CD single

1. "Perfect Gentleman" (LP version) – 4:09
2. "Perfect Gentleman" (vinyl remix featuring Xzibit and King Yellowman) – 4:38
3. "Perfect Gentleman" (Kelly G House mix) – 8:25
4. "Perfect Gentleman" (CD extra video)

UK 12-inch single

A1. "Perfect Gentleman" (remix—vinyl mix featuring Xzibit and King Yellowman) – 4:38
A2. "Perfect Gentleman" (remix instrumental) – 4:38
B1. "Perfect Gentleman" (Kelly G House Mix) – 8:25
B2. "Perfect Gentleman" (Kelly G House Mix instrumental) – 8:25

UK cassette single

1. "Perfect Gentleman" (LP version) – 4:09
2. "Perfect Gentleman" (vinyl remix featuring Xzibit and King Yellowman) – 4:38

European CD single

1. "Perfect Gentleman" (radio edit) – 3:19
2. "Perfect Gentleman" (remix radio edit) – 3:59

Australian CD single

1. "Perfect Gentleman" (radio edit) – 3:19
2. "Perfect Gentleman" (remix radio edit) – 3:59
3. "Perfect Gentleman" (Kelly G House mix) – 8:25
4. "911" (video version)

== Credits and personnel ==
Credits and personnel are taken from The Ecleftic: 2 Sides II a Book album booklet.

Studios

- Recorded and mixed at The Hit Factory (New York City)
- Mastered at Sterling Sound (New York City)

Personnel

- Wyclef Jean – writing, vocals, production
- Jerry "Wonder" Duplessis – writing (as Jerry Duplessis), production
- Hope Harris – writing, vocals
- Joe Di Marco – additional background vocals
- Farel Sedeck Guerschom Jean – co-production
- Andy Grassi – recording, mixing, mastering
- Chris Gehringer – mastering
- Serge "Sergical" Tsai – mastering

== Charts ==
=== Weekly charts ===
| Chart (2001) | Peak position |
|---|---|
| Australia (ARIA) | 58 |
| Austria (Ö3 Austria Top 40) | 13 |
| Belgium (Ultratip Bubbling Under Flanders) | 7 |
| Belgium (Ultratip Bubbling Under Wallonia) | 2 |
| Denmark (Tracklisten) | 8 |
| Europe (Eurochart Hot 100) | 6 |
| Germany (GfK) | 7 |
| Ireland (IRMA) | 7 |
| Netherlands (Dutch Top 40) | 37 |
| Netherlands (Single Top 100) | 33 |
| New Zealand (Recorded Music NZ) | 34 |
| Norway (VG-lista) | 7 |
| Scotland Singles (Official Charts) | 9 |
| Sweden (Sverigetopplistan) | 4 |
| Switzerland (Schweizer Hitparade) | 17 |
| UK Singles (Official Charts) | 4 |
| UK Dance (Official Charts) | 16 |
| UK Hip Hop/R&B (Official Charts) | 2 |
| US Rhythmic Airplay (Billboard) | 21 |

=== Year-end charts ===
| Chart (2001) | Position |
|---|---|
| Austria (Ö3 Austria Top 40) | 75 |
| Europe (Eurochart Hot 100) | 84 |
| Germany (Media Control) | 52 |
| Ireland (IRMA) | 41 |
| Sweden (Hitlistan) | 32 |
| UK Singles (OCC) | 26 |
| US Rhythmic Top 40 (Billboard) | 80 |

== Certifications ==
| Region | Certification | Certified units/sales |
|---|---|---|
| New Zealand (RMNZ) | Gold | 15,000^{‡} |
| Sweden (GLF) | Gold | 15,000^{^} |
| United Kingdom (BPI) | Platinum | 600,000^{‡} |
^{^} Shipments figures based on certification alone.^{‡} Sales+streaming figures based on certification alone.

== Release history ==
| Region | Date | Format(s) | Label(s) | Ref. |
|---|---|---|---|---|
| United States | 30 January 2001 | Rhythmic contemporary radio | Columbia | |
| United States | 27 March 2001 | Urban radio | Columbia | |
| United Kingdom | 9 July 2001 | 12-inch vinyl; CD; cassette | Columbia | |
| Australia | 29 October 2001 | CD | Columbia | |

== Cover versions ==
"Perfect Gentleman" was covered by the reggae rock band Slightly Stoopid on their 2003 LP Everything You Need. Harry Tait also covered this on his acoustic album named All the Things I Love and More, which debuted at number 99 on the UK Albums Chart.
