= The Ecleftic: 2 Sides II a Book =

Studio album by Wyclef Jean
- Released: 22 August 2000
- Length: 73:51
- Label: Columbia
- Producer: Wyclef Jean; Jerry Wonda; Farel Jean

Wyclef Jean chronology
The Carnival (1997)	The Ecleftic: 2 Sides II a Book (2000)	Masquerade (2002)

Singles from The Ecleftic: 2 Sides II a Book
- 1. "It Doesn't Matter" Released: 26 June 2000; 2. "911" Released: 5 September 2000; 3. "Perfect Gentleman" Released: 30 January 2001; 4. "Wish You Were Here" Released: 26 November 2001

The Ecleftic: 2 Sides II a Book is the second studio album released by Haitian hip hop musician Wyclef Jean. The album was supported by its singles "It Doesn't Matter", "911" and "Perfect Gentleman". At the 43rd Grammy Awards his duet with Mary J. Blige, "911" earned him a nomination for Grammy Award for Best R&B Performance by a Duo or Group with Vocals in 2001. The album debuted at number nine on the US Billboard 200 chart. It was certified platinum by the Recording Industry Association of America (RIAA).

== Music ==
"Kenny Rogers & Pharoahe Monch Dub Plate" features a guest appearance from Kenny Rogers, contributing a variation of the chorus from his 1978 number-one hit "The Gambler." Track 14 "However You Want It" is a response to Canibus for the remarks he made about him on his album 2000 B.C. (Before Can-I-Bus). Track 18, "Bus Search", is a spoken-word mini drama, in which Jean's tour bus is stopped by two Police officers, one of whom threatens to make them empty the bus' contents unless they play him something by Pink Floyd. The following track is a cover of the latter's "Wish You Were Here", overlaid with Jean rapping about the band.

== Critical reception ==
Professional ratings
Aggregate scores
Source	Rating
Metacritic	67/100
Review scores
Source	Rating
AllMusic	3.5/5 stars
Robert Christgau	A−
RapReviews	7/10
Rolling Stone	4/5 stars
The Rolling Stone Album Guide	4.5/5 stars
Yahoo! Music UK	5/10

Nathan Rabin from The A.V. Club wrote that The Ecleftic: 2 Sides II a Book "shows Jean at the top of his game, creating music that equals and often surpasses his groundbreaking work with The Fugees. The past few years have seen brilliant artists stretching the boundaries of what hip-hop can be and do, from Mos Def and Talib Kweli to Dead Prez to Lauryn Hill, but The Ecleftic confirms Jean's nearly unparalleled talent and boundless ambition." Rolling Stone critic Kris Ex found that "with this album, [Jean]'s re-established himself as a musician, producer, writer, arranger and personality who is both of hip-hop and bigger than it. He knows rap fans might doubt his intentions [...] Clef may be a flirt – cavorting with pop music for Grammys and mainstream appeal – but The Ecleftic shows without question where home and his heart are." Michael Paoletta Billboard felt that although not as "cohesive as Jean's Carnival, The Ecleftic spins a compelling tale of a hip-hop superstar who defies convention."

AllMusic editor Diana Potts rated the album three and a half starts out of five. She wrote: "On Ecleftic, Wyclef comes full-fisted with commentary on the police system, urban ills, and stereotypes. Though some are merited, after the first dozen they lose their impact and are swallowed by catchy beats. Overall, another commentary and playfully meticulous production by Wyclef, who has struggled to separate himself from the Fugees. It is clear, with a good retrospective listen, how much Wyclef's production style was a large part of the praised trio. With The Ecleftic: 2 Sides II a Book, Wyclef takes another strong step toward solidifying his own identity." Tom Sinclair from Entertainment Weekly found that on The Ecleftic: 2 Sides II a Book "Wyclef Jean sounds like he’s having too much of a ball refashioning himself as a new jack renaissance man to concern himself with a Fugees reunion. Still, he can’t resist starting a little mischief [...] Right now, though, he’s digging his way out of his own pigeonhole, armed with a guitar and a restless imagination. And it’s a beautiful thing."

== Commercial performance ==
The Ecleftic: 2 Sides II a Book debuted at number nine on the US Billboard 200 selling 95,400 copies in its first week. The album also peaked at number three on the US Top R&B/Hip-Hop Albums chart. On August 31, 2001, the album was certified platinum by the Recording Industry Association of America (RIAA) for sales of over a million copies in the United States.

In the UK, the album peaked at number five on the UK Albums Chart and was certified Silver by the British Phonographic Industry (BPI) for denoting sales of 60,000 copies in the United Kingdom.

== Track listing ==
The Ecleftic: 2 Sides II a Book – Standard edition
No.	Title	Writer(s)	Producer(s)	Length
1.	"Columbia Records" (featuring James Bean, Hiro Tahara, and Varshini Soobiah)	Jean; Duplessis	Jerry 'Wonda' Duplessis	1:54
2.	"Where Fugees At?"	Jean; Salaam Remi	Salaam Remi	3:48
3.	"Kenny Rogers & Pharoahe Monch Dub Plate" (featuring Kenny Rogers and Pharoahe Monch)	Jean; Jerry Duplessis; Tony Jamerson; Don Schlitz	Jerry 'Wonda' Duplessis	3:04
4.	"Thug Angels" (featuring Small World)	Jean; Duplessis	Jerry 'Wonda' Duplessis	6:35
5.	"It Doesn't Matter" (featuring The Rock and Melky Sedeck)	Jean; Duplessis; Andrew Alexander Long; Bill Danoff; Desmond Child; John Denver; Ricky Walters; Robi Rosa; Taffy Danoff	Jerry 'Wonda' Duplessis	3:57
6.	"911" (featuring Mary J. Blige)	Jean; Duplessis	Jerry 'Wonda' Duplessis	4:19
7.	"Pullin' Me In"	Jean; Duplessis	Sedeck	4:38
8.	"Da Cypha" (featuring Marie Antoinette, Supreme C, and Hope)	Jean; Duplessis; George David Weiss; Hope Harris; Luigi Creatore; Hugo Peretti; Marie Antoinette; Carl Harte	Jerry 'Wonda' Duplessis	4:26
9.	"Runaway" (featuring Earth, Wind & Fire and The Product G&B)	Jean; Duplessis; Maurice White	Jerry 'Wonda' Duplessis	4:56
10.	"Red Light District" (featuring Andy Grassi and Varshini Soobiah)	Jean; Duplessis	Jerry 'Wonda' Duplessis	0:40
11.	"Perfect Gentleman" (featuring Hope)	Jean; Duplessis; Harris	Jerry 'Wonda' Duplessis	4:09
12.	"Low Income" (featuring Beast & 718-Crew)	Jean; Duplessis	Jerry 'Wonda' Duplessis	4:20
13.	"Whitney Houston Dub Plate" (featuring Whitney Houston)	Jean; Duplessis	Jerry 'Wonda' Duplessis	1:42
14.	"However You Want It"	Jean; Duplessis	Jerry 'Wonda' Duplessis	3:03
15.	"Hollyhood to Hollywood" (featuring Small World)	Jean; Duplessis; Herbie Hancock; Léo Missir; Patricia Carli; William Maragh	Jerry 'Wonda' Duplessis	4:45
16.	"Diallo" (featuring Youssou N'Dour and MB²)	Jean; Duplessis	Jerry 'Wonda' Duplessis	7:22
17.	"Something About Mary"	Jean; Duplessis	Jerry 'Wonda' Duplessis	5:20
18.	"Bus Search" (featuring Andy Grassi)	Jean; Duplessis	Jerry 'Wonda' Duplessis	0:47
19.	"Wish You Were Here"	David Gilmour; Roger Waters; Jean; Duplessis	Jerry 'Wonda' Duplessis	4:06

The Ecleftic: 2 Sides II a Book – French edition
No.	Title	Writer(s)	Producer(s)	Length
20.	"It Doesn't Matter (Ça Ne Me Fait Rien) (French version)" (featuring Ben-J and Jacky)	Jean; Duplessis; Long; Danoff; Child; Denver; Walters; Rosa; Danoff	Jerry 'Wonda' Duplessis	3:57

The Ecleftic: 2 Sides II a Book – Best Buy edition
No.	Title	Writer(s)	Producer(s)	Length
1.	"Younger Days"	Jean; Duplessis	Jerry 'Wonda' Duplessis	5:01
2.	"Thug Angels" (Live)	Jean; Duplessis	Jerry 'Wonda' Duplessis	4:19
3.	"It Doesn't Matter (Live)" (featuring The Rock and Melky Sedeck)	Jean; Duplessis; Long; Danoff; Child; Denver; Walters; Rosa; Danoff	Jerry 'Wonda' Duplessis	8:26

The Ecleftic: 2 Sides II a Book – Deluxe edition bonus disc
No.	Title	Writer(s)	Producer(s)	Length
1.	"Gone Till November"	Jean; Duplessis	Jerry 'Wonda' Duplessis	3:28
2.	"Gone Till November (The Makin' Runs Remix)" (featuring Canibus)	Jean; Duplessis; Germaine Williams	Jerry 'Wonda' Duplessis	4:05
3.	"We Trying to Stay Alive" (featuring Pras and John Forté)	Jean; Pras Michel; John Forté; Robin Gibb; Barry Gibb; Maurice Gibb	Jerry 'Wonda' Duplessis	3:11
4.	"Guantanamera" (featuring Celia Cruz, Jeni Fujita, and Lauryn Hill)	Jean; Duplessis; Héctor Angulo; José Martí; Pete Seeger	Jerry 'Wonda' Duplessis	4:30
5.	"Perfect Gentleman (Remix Radio Edit)" (featuring Xzibit and King Yellowman)	Jean; Duplessis; Harris; Winston Foster; Alvin Joiner	Jerry 'Wonda' Duplessis	3:58

== Charts ==
=== Weekly charts ===
Weekly chart performance for The Ecleftic: 2 Sides II a Book
Chart (2000–2001)	Peak position
Australian Albums (ARIA)	83
Austrian Albums (Ö3 Austria)	17
Canadian Albums (Billboard)	7
Dutch Albums (Album Top 100)	43
French Albums (SNEP)	25
German Albums (Offizielle Top 100)	20
Irish Albums (IRMA)	9
Norwegian Albums (VG-lista)	6
Scottish Albums (OCC)	18
Swedish Albums (Sverigetopplistan)	4
Swiss Albums (Schweizer Hitparade)	10
UK Albums (OCC)	5
US Billboard 200	9
US Top R&B/Hip-Hop Albums (Billboard)	3

=== Year-end charts ===
2000 year-end chart performance for The Ecleftic: 2 Sides II a Book
Chart (2000)	Position
Canadian Albums (Nielsen SoundScan)	126
US Billboard 200	164
US Top R&B/Hip-Hop Albums (Billboard)	75

2001 year-end chart performance for The Ecleftic: 2 Sides II a Book
Chart (2001)	Position
Canadian R&B Albums (Nielsen SoundScan)	89
Swedish Albums (Sverigetopplistan)	59
UK Albums (OCC)	89

== Certifications ==
Certifications for The Ecleftic: 2 Sides II a Book
Region	Certification	Certified units/sales
Canada (Music Canada)	Gold	50,000^{^}
Germany (BVMI)	Gold	150,000^{^}
Norway (IFPI Norway)	Gold	25,000^{*}
Sweden (GLF)	Gold	40,000^{^}
United Kingdom (BPI)	Gold	100,000^{^}
United States (RIAA)	Platinum	1,000,000^{^}
^{*} Sales figures based on certification alone.^{^} Shipments figures based on certification alone.
