= Carnival Vol. II: Memoirs of an Immigrant =

Studio album by Wyclef Jean
- Released: November 26, 2007
- Length: 62:03
- Label: Columbia
- Producer: Akon; will.i.am; Wyclef Jean; Jerry "Wonda" Duplessis; Aadesh Shrivastava; Lamont "Logic" Coleman

Wyclef Jean chronology
Welcome to Haiti: Creole 101 (2004)	Carnival Vol. II: Memoirs of an Immigrant (2007)	From the Hut, To the Projects, To the Mansion (2009)

Singles from Carnival Vol. II: Memoirs of an Immigrant
- 1. "Sweetest Girl (Dollar Bill)" Released: August 14, 2007; 2. "Fast Car" Released: May 20, 2008; 3. "Let Me Touch Your Button" Released: November 9, 2008

Professional ratings
Aggregate scores
Source	Rating
Metacritic	72/100
Review scores
Source	Rating
AllMusic	4/5 stars
Entertainment Weekly	B−
Okayplayer	4/5 stars
RapReviews	9/10
PopMatters	7/10
Rolling Stone	3.5/5 stars
USA Today	4/4 stars

Carnival Vol. II: Memoirs of an Immigrant is the sixth studio album by Haitian rapper and former Fugees member Wyclef Jean, released in 2007 as the sequel to his first solo album, The Carnival. Speaking to noted urban writer Pete Lewis of the award-winning Blues & Soul in September 2007, Wyclef explained his thinking behind the album: "Titling it The Carnival 2 was down to The Carnival back in '97 being my first multi-cultural CD. It had rhythms from all over the world, and in that way this new record is the sequel. You know, there's a revolution of culture going on around the world today where the United Nations is everywhere! You go into a room, and everybody's from a different country. It's like we're ALL immigrants! Some of these people may be listening to bhangra, some to hip hop, some to rock... And, when you put that fusion together, it unites people through music."

== Commercial performance ==
Carnival Vol. II: Memoirs of an Immigrant debuted and peaked at number 28 on the U.S. Billboard 200 chart and sold about 46,000 units in its debut week.

== Track listing ==
Carnival Vol. II: Memoirs of an Immigrant – Standard edition
No.	Title	Writer(s)	Producer(s)	Length
1.	"Intro"	Wyclef Jean; Jerry Duplessis	Jerry "Wonda" Duplessis	0:26
2.	"Riot" (featuring Serj Tankian and Sizzla)	Jean; Duplessis; Dennis Thomas; Lloyd James; Robbie Lyn; Robbie Shakespeare; Sly Dunbar	Jerry "Wonda" Duplessis	5:15
3.	"Sweetest Girl (Dollar Bill)" (featuring Akon, Lil Wayne and Niia)	Jean; Duplessis; Aliaune Thiam; Clifford Smith; Corey Woods; David Porter; Dennis Coles; Dewayne Carter; Gary Grice; Isaac Hayes; Jason Hunter; Keith Lancaster; Lamont Hawkes; Robert Diggs; Russel Jones	Devon Golder, Lamont "Logic" Coleman, Jerry "Wonda" Duplessis	3:59
4.	"Welcome to the East" (featuring Sizzla)	Jean; Duplessis; Sizzla Kalonji	Jerry "Wonda" Duplessis	4:18
5.	"Slow Down" (featuring T.I.)	Jean; Duplessis; Clifford Harris, Jr.; Sedeck; Devon Golder; Lamont "Logic" Coleman	Devon Golder, Lamont "Logic" Coleman, Jerry "Wonda" Duplessis	5:17
6.	"King & Queen" (featuring Shakira)	Jean; Duplessis; Golder; Coleman; Anthony Leggett	Jerry "Wonda" Duplessis	3:23
7.	"Fast Car" (featuring Paul Simon)	Jean; Duplessis; Golder; Coleman; Paul Simon; Farel Jean; Keith Duplessis	Keith "Lil Wonda" Duplessis, Sedeck, Jerry "Wonda" Duplessis	4:03
8.	"What About the Baby" (featuring Mary J. Blige)	Jean; Duplessis; Mary J. Blige; LaTavia Parker	Keith "Lil Wonda" Duplessis, Jerry "Wonda" Duplessis	3:36
9.	"Hollywood Meets Bollywood (Immigration)" (featuring Chamillionaire and Aadesh Shrivastava)	Jean; Duplessis; Golder; Coleman; Hakeem Seriki	Jerry "Wonda" Duplessis	4:52
10.	"Any Other Day" (featuring Norah Jones)	Jean; Duplessis; Lee Alexander; Norah Jones	Jerry "Wonda" Duplessis	4:11
11.	"Heaven’s In New York"	Jean; Duplessis	Jerry "Wonda" Duplessis	4:47
12.	"Selena" (featuring Melissa Jiménez)	Jean; Duplessis; Pete Astudillo; Selena Quintanilla	Sedeck, Jerry "Wonda" Duplessis	4:04
13.	"Touch Your Button (Carnival Jam)" (featuring will.i.am, Melissa Jiménez, Machel Montano, Daniela Mercury, Black Alex, Shabba and Djakout Mizik)	Jean; Duplessis; Henry Celestin; Robert Martino; William Adams; Machel Montano	will.i.am, Djakout Mizik, Jerry "Wonda" Duplessis	13:29
14.	"Outro"	Jean; Duplessis	Jerry "Wonda" Duplessis	0:23

Carnival Vol. II: Memoirs of an Immigrant – Walmart edition
No.	Title	Writer(s)	Producer(s)	Length
15.	"Slow Down" (Live at Wal-Mart Soundcheck)	Jean; Duplessis; Harris, Jr.; Sedeck; Golder; Coleman	Devon Golder, Lamont "Logic" Coleman, Jerry "Wonda" Duplessis
16.	"Selena" (Live at Wal-Mart Soundcheck)	Jean; Duplessis; Astudillo; Quintanilla	Sedeck, Jerry "Wonda" Duplessis

Carnival Vol. II: Memoirs of an Immigrant – Deluxe edition
No.	Title	Writer(s)	Producer(s)	Length
15.	"Sweetest Girl (Dollar Bill)" (Rhapsody Originals Version)	Jean; Duplessis; Thiam; Smith; Woods; Porter; Coles; Carter; Grice; Hayes; Hunter; Lancaster; Hawkes; Diggs; Jones	Devon Golder, Lamont "Logic" Coleman, Jerry "Wonda" Duplessis
16.	"Slow Down" (Rhapsody Originals Version)	Jean; Duplessis; Harris, Jr.; Sedeck; Golder; Coleman	Devon Golder, Lamont "Logic" Coleman, Jerry "Wonda" Duplessis
17.	"President" (Rhapsody Originals Version)	Jean; Duplessis	Jerry "Wonda" Duplessis

Carnival Vol. II: Memoirs of an Immigrant – Deluxe edition bonus disc
No.	Title	Writer(s)	Producer(s)	Length
1.	"Million Voices" (featuring the African Children's Choir)			4:22
2.	"Emmanuelle"			3:38
3.	"Sweetest Girl (Dollar Bill) (Remix)" (featuring Akon, Lil Wayne, Raekwon & Niia)	Jean; Duplessis; Thiam; Smith; Woods; Porter; Coles; Carter; Grice; Hayes; Hunter; Lancaster; Hawkes; Diggs; Jones	Devon Golder, Lamont "Logic" Coleman, Jerry "Wonda" Duplessis	3:52
4.	"China Wine" (featuring Sun, Elephant Man and Tony Matterhorn)	Jean; Duplessis; Tony Matterhorn; Oneal Bryan	Jerry "Wonda" Duplessis	3:16
5.	"On Tour" (featuring Lucina)	Jean; Duplessis	Guy Manoukian, Jerry "Wonda" Duplessis	3:43

Carnival Vol. II: Memoirs of an Immigrant – European edition
No.	Title	Writer(s)	Producer(s)	Length
15.	"On Tour" (featuring Lucina)	Jean; Duplessis	Guy Manoukian, Jerry "Wonda" Duplessis	3:43
16.	"China Wine" (featuring Sun, Elephant Man and Tony Matterhorn)	Jean; Duplessis; Matterhorn; Bryan	Jerry "Wonda" Duplessis	3:16
17.	"Paris on Fire" (featuring Passi)			4:05

== Charts ==
=== Weekly charts ===
Chart (2007)	Peak position
Australian Urban Albums (ARIA)	14
French Albums (SNEP)	111
Swiss Albums (Schweizer Hitparade)	33
US Billboard 200	28
US Top R&B/Hip-Hop Albums (Billboard)	9

=== Year-end charts ===
Chart (2008)	Position
US Top R&B/Hip-Hop Albums (Billboard)	80
