= 911 (Wyclef Jean song) =

2000 single by Wyclef Jean featuring Mary J. Blige

Single by Wyclef Jean featuring Mary J. Blige

from the album The Ecleftic: 2 Sides II a Book
- B-side: "Younger Days"
- Released: 5 September 2000
- Studio: The Hit Factory (New York City)
- Length: 4:19
- Label: Columbia
- Songwriters: Wyclef Jean; Jerry Duplessis; Katia Cadet; Mary Brown
- Producers: Wyclef Jean; Jerry "Wonder" Duplessis

Wyclef Jean singles chronology
"It Doesn't Matter" (2000)	"911" (2000)	"Perfect Gentleman" (2001)

Mary J. Blige singles chronology
"Your Child" (2000)	"911" (2000)	"Family Affair" (2001)

"911" is a duet between Haitian rapper Wyclef Jean and American soul music singer Mary J. Blige. It was released on 5 September 2000 as the third single from Jean's second studio album, The Ecleftic: 2 Sides II a Book (2000), and was later included on Blige's compilation Reflections (A Retrospective) (2006). The song peaked at number 38 on the US Billboard Hot 100 chart and achieved international success, reaching number one in Norway and Sweden. It was nominated for Best R&B Performance by a Duo or Group at the 43rd Annual Grammy Awards in 2001.

== Music and video ==
The song depicts two star-crossed lovers in a web of drama with the male narrator running from police while the female narrator worries forlornly over him. The relationship is apparently under external pressures, as Jean sings "messing around with you is gonna get (the man) life", and later reflecting "it's worth the sacrifice". The song's music video was directed by Marcus Raboy.

== Chart performances and awards ==
"911" reached number 38 on the US Billboard Hot 100. The song was successful in Norway and Sweden, where it reached number one for six and five weeks, respectively. The single earned a platinum disc in Norway. It was also a top-10 hit in Denmark, Finland, Ireland, the Netherlands, Switzerland, and the United Kingdom. At the 43rd Annual Grammy Awards in 2001, "911" was nominated for Best R&B Performance by a Duo or Group.

== Track listings ==
US 12-inch single

A1. "911" (Ghetto Love remix) – 4:01
A2. "911" (Ghetto Love remix instrumental) – 4:01
A3. "911" (Ghetto Love remix a cappella) – 4:01
B1. "911" (Emergency remix) – 4:23
B2. "911" (Emergency remix instrumental) – 4:23
B3. "911" (LP version) – 4:01

Australian CD single 1

1. "911" (radio edit) – 4:06
2. "911" (Ghetto Love remix) – 4:01
3. "Younger Days" – 5:00
4. "It Doesn't Matter" (remix featuring Hope) – 4:05

Australian CD single 2

1. "911" (Emergency remix) – 4:23
2. "911" (radio edit) – 4:06
3. "911" (Ghetto Love remix) – 4:01
4. "Younger Days" – 5:00
5. "It Doesn't Matter" (remix featuring Hope) – 4:05

UK CD single

1. "911" (LP version) – 4:21
2. "Gone till November" – 3:29
3. "It Doesn't Matter" – 4:05

UK cassette single

1. "911" (LP version) – 4:21
2. "911" (Ghetto Love remix) – 4:01

European CD single

1. "911" (LP version) – 4:21
2. "911" (Ghetto Love remix) – 4:01
3. "911" (Emergency remix) – 4:23

French CD single

1. "911" (radio edit) – 4:06
2. "911" (Ghetto Love remix) – 4:01

== Credits and personnel ==
Credits are taken from The Ecleftic: 2 Sides II a Book album booklet.

Studios

- Recorded and mixed at The Hit Factory (New York City)
- Mastered at Sterling Sound (New York City)

Personnel

- Wyclef Jean – writing, vocals, production
- Jerry "Wonder" Duplessis – writing, production
- Katia Cadet – writing
- Mary Brown – writing, background arrangements
- Mary J. Blige – featured vocals
- MB² – backing vocals
- Sedeck – co-production
- Andy Grassi – mixing, recording engineer, mastering
- Michael McCoy – recording engineer
- Chris Gehringer – mastering
- Serge "Sergical" Tsai – mastering

== Charts ==
=== Weekly charts ===
Chart (2000–2001)	Peak position
Austria (Ö3 Austria Top 40)	21
Belgium (Ultratop 50 Flanders)	16
Belgium (Ultratop 50 Wallonia)	11
Canada (Nielsen SoundScan)	27
Denmark (Tracklisten)	9
Europe (Eurochart Hot 100)	6
Finland (Suomen virallinen lista)	4
France (SNEP)	11
Germany (GfK)	12
Ireland (IRMA)	10
Italy (FIMI)	34
Norway (VG-lista)	1
Netherlands (Dutch Top 40)	5
Netherlands (Single Top 100)	8
Portugal (AFP)	10
Scotland Singles (OCC)	12
Sweden (Sverigetopplistan)	1
Switzerland (Schweizer Hitparade)	9
UK Singles (OCC)	9
UK Hip Hop/R&B (OCC)	3
US Billboard Hot 100	38
US Hot R&B/Hip-Hop Songs (Billboard)	6
US Hot Rap Songs (Billboard)	8

=== Year-end charts ===
Chart (2000)	Position
Sweden (Hitlistan)	4
UK Singles (OCC)	138
US Hot R&B/Hip-Hop Singles & Tracks (Billboard)	73

Chart (2001)	Position
Belgium (Ultratop 50 Flanders)	99
Belgium (Ultratop 50 Wallonia)	57
Canada (Nielsen SoundScan)	152
Europe (Eurochart Hot 100)	28
France (SNEP)	54
Germany (Media Control)	72
Netherlands (Dutch Top 40)	99
Netherlands (Single Top 100)	86
Switzerland (Schweizer Hitparade)	62
US Hot R&B/Hip-Hop Singles & Tracks (Billboard)	81

== Certifications ==
Region	Certification	Certified units/sales
France (SNEP)	Gold	250,000^{*}
Norway (IFPI Norway)	Platinum	
Sweden (GLF)	Gold	15,000^{^}
United Kingdom (BPI)	Silver	200,000^{‡}
^{*} Sales figures based on certification alone.^{^} Shipments figures based on certification alone.^{‡} Sales+streaming figures based on certification alone.

== Release history ==
Region	Date	Format(s)	Label(s)	Ref(s).
United States	5 September 2000	Rhythmic contemporary; urban radio	Columbia	
United Kingdom	4 December 2000	CD; cassette	Columbia	
Australia	26 March 2001	CD	Columbia	
