= We Trying to Stay Alive =

Single by Wyclef Jean featuring John Forté and Pras

from the album The Carnival
- B-side: "Anything Can Happen"
- Released: 27 May 1997
- Recorded: 1996–1997
- Genre: Hip hop
- Length: 3:11
- Label: Ruffhouse; Columbia
- Songwriters: Nelust Jean; John Forté; Prakazrel Michel; Robin Gibb; Barry Gibb; Maurice Gibb
- Producers: Jerry 'Wonder' Duplessis; Wyclef Jean; Pras Michel

Wyclef Jean singles chronology
"We Trying to Stay Alive" (1997)	"Guantanamera" (1997)

Music video
- "Wyclef Jean - We Trying To Stay Alive (Official Video) ft. John Forté, Pras" on YouTube

"We Trying to Stay Alive" is the debut single by Haitian rapper Wyclef Jean, is the lead single from his 1997 debut solo album, The Carnival. The song features verses by John Forté and Pras (of the Fugees) and samples the 1977 Bee Gees hit "Stayin' Alive" and Audio Two's "Top Billin'" (1987). The video version also contains an interpolation of the main melody of "Trans-Europe Express" by "Kraftwerk". In the US, it reached number 45 on the Billboard Hot 100 chart. Additionally, it reached number three on the Hot Rap Songs chart and number 14 on the Hot R&B Singles chart. The track reached number 87 on VH1's "100 Greatest Hip-Hop Songs of All Time".

== Reception ==
While the sampling of the Bee Gees hit "Stayin' Alive" was greenlit by the Bee Gee's management, the final song was not warmly received by the Bee Gees themselves. "I have to say I do not like anyone sampling our voices." Barry Gibb told MTV News in regards to the song. "Don't like it. Don't approve of it. Don't like it."

== Chart performance ==
We Trying to Stay Alive peaked at number 45 on the US Billboard Hot 100 chart and spent a total of 12 weeks on the chart. It also peaked at number four on the Hot R&B Singles chart and number three on the Hot Rap Songs chart. In the UK, the song peaked at number 13 on the UK Singles Chart and spent a total of five weeks on the chart.

== Music video ==
The official music video for the song was directed by Roman Coppola.

== Track listings ==
UK CD1 (664681 2)

1. "We Trying to Stay Alive" (LP Version)
2. "We Trying to Stay Alive" (Instrumental)
3. "Anything Can Happen" (LP Version)
4. "Anything Can Happen" (Instrumental)

UK CD2 (664681 5)

1. "We Trying to Stay Alive" (LP Version)
2. "We Trying to Stay Alive" (Salaam Remi Remix)
3. "Imagino" (Creole Version)
4. "Flavor from the Carnival" (LP Snippets)

== Charts ==
=== Weekly charts ===
Chart (1997)	Peak position
Canada (Nielsen SoundScan)	6
Finland (Suomen virallinen lista)	12
Germany (GfK)	72
New Zealand (Recorded Music NZ)	5
Norway (VG-lista)	10
Sweden (Sverigetopplistan)	18
UK Singles (Official Charts)	13
US Billboard Hot 100	45
US Dance Singles Sales (Billboard)	2
US Hot R&B/Hip-Hop Songs (Billboard)	14
US Hot Rap Songs (Billboard)	3

=== Year-end charts ===
Chart (1997)	Position
New Zealand (RIANZ)	50
Sweden (Topplistan)	99
US Hot R&B Singles (Billboard)	79
US Hot Rap Singles (Billboard)	39
US Maxi-Singles Sales (Billboard)	15
