= Wyclef Jean =

Haitian rapper (born 1969)

Wyclef Jean National Order of Honour and Merit
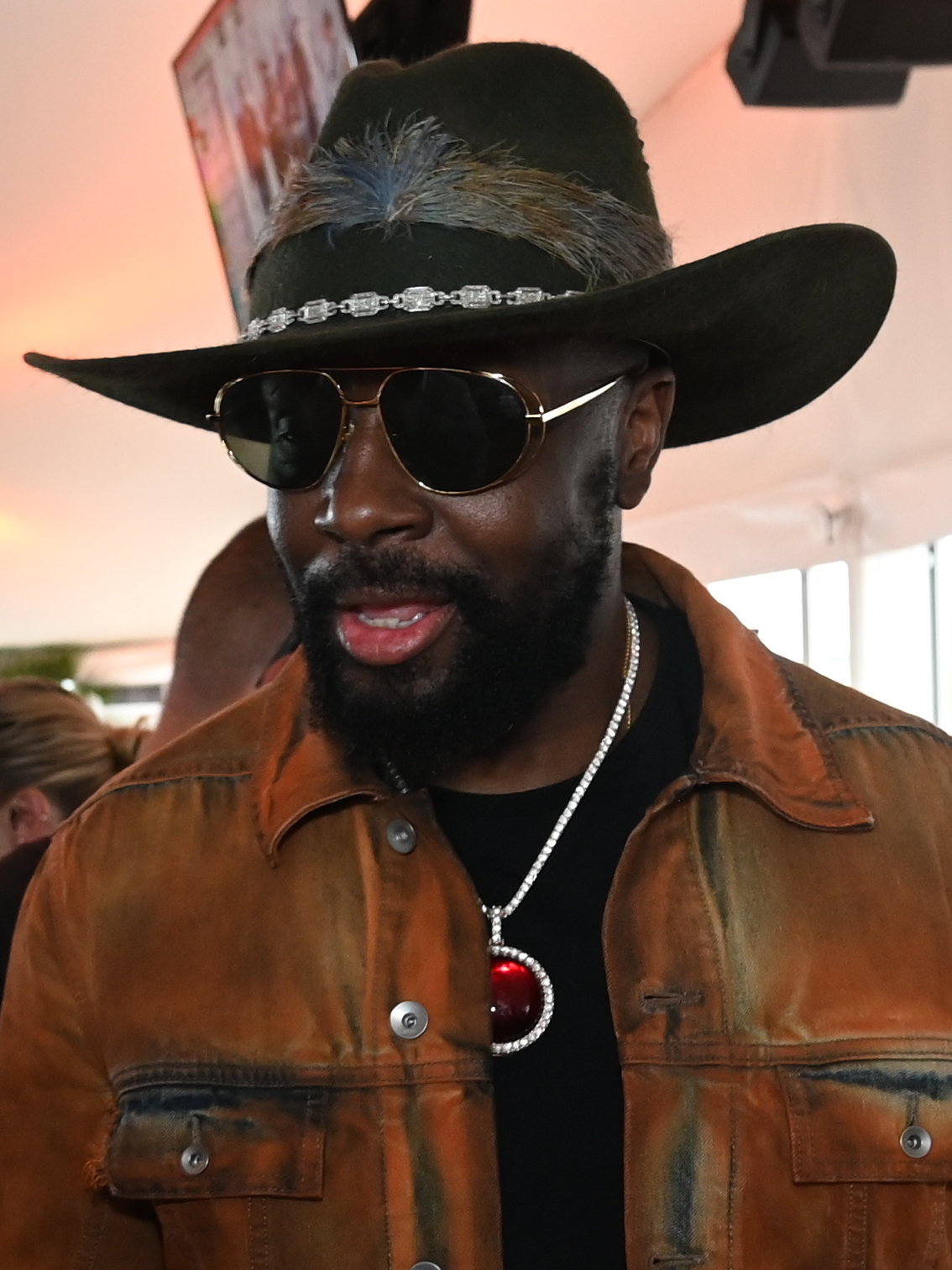
- Jean in 2025
- Born: Nelust Wyclef Jean; October 17, 1969 (age 57); Croix-des-Bouquets, Haiti
- Other names: Wyclef; Toussaint St. Jean; Nel; Clef
- Education: Five Towns College; Berklee College of Music
- Occupations: Rapper; singer; songwriter; record producer
- Years active: 1989–present
- Organization: Yéle Haiti
- Works: Discography
- Spouse: Claudinette Jean (m. 1994)
- Children: 1
- Relatives: Blandinna Jean (sister); Farel Jean (brother); Raymond Joseph (cousin); Jerry Duplessis (cousin)
- Awards: Full list
- Musical career
- Origin: East Orange, New Jersey, U.S. Newark, New Jersey, U.S.
- Genres: Hip-hop; reggae fusion; R&B; pop rap
- Instruments: Vocals; guitar
- Labels: Heads Music; E1; Legacy; Carnival; Sony BMG; J; Clef; Columbia; Ruffhouse
- Member of: Fugees; Refugee Camp All-Stars
- Website: www.wyclef.com

Nelust Wyclef Jean (/ˈwaɪklɛf ˈʒɒn/ WY-klef ZHON; born October 17, 1969) is a Haitian rapper, singer, songwriter and music producer. He gained fame as a founding member of the hip hop trio the Fugees. Their second album The Score (1996) became one of the best-selling albums of all time. He launched a solo career with Wyclef Jean Presents The Carnival (1997), featuring the single "We Trying to Stay Alive", the Grammy-nominated "Guantanamera" featuring Celia Cruz and Lauryn Hill, and the top ten hit "Gone till November".

His second album, The Ecleftic: 2 Sides II a Book (2000), included the R&B hit "911" featuring Mary J. Blige. His third album, Masquerade (2002), peaked within the top ten of the Billboard 200, and spawned the top 40 single "Two Wrongs" with Claudette Ortiz. He made a guest appearance on the 2006 single "Hips Don't Lie" by Shakira, which became a global success, reaching number one in 18 countries. His song "Sweetest Girl (Dollar Bill)" with Akon, Lil Wayne and Niia, served as the lead single for his sixth studio album Carnival Vol. II: Memoirs of an Immigrant (2007). He released "Dar um Jeito (We Will Find a Way)", the official 2014 FIFA World Cup anthem alongside Carlos Santana, Avicii, and Alexandre Pires.

Jean has produced and co-written several songs for other artists, including Destiny's Child's first hit "No, No, No" remix, "My Love Is Your Love" by Whitney Houston, "Maria Maria" by Santana, "Ghetto Supastar (That Is What You Are)" by Pras featuring Ol' Dirty Bastard and Mya, and "What Would You Do?" by City High. Furthermore, he composed the score for the 2003 film The Agronomist. His accolades include three Grammy Awards, the BET Humanitarian Award and the NAACP Vanguard Award. He received a Golden Globe nomination for Best Original Song for co-writing the song "Million Voices" for Hotel Rwanda (2004).

Jean has been also active in Haitian politics and philanthropy. In 1999, he released the charity single "New Day" alongside Bono. He was appointed Ambassador-at-Large of Haiti in 2007 and later ran for the 2010 Haitian presidency, but was deemed ineligible due to residency requirements. His charity, Yéle Haiti, raised funds for Haitian relief efforts, including the 2010 Haitian earthquake, before disbanding amid financial scrutiny. Haitian President Michel Martelly awarded him the National Order of Honour and Merit.

== Early life ==
Named after the biblical scholar John Wycliffe, Wyclef Jean was born in Croix-des-Bouquets, Haiti on October 17, 1969. At nine years old, he emigrated with his family to Brooklyn, New York City, and ultimately settled in East Orange and Newark, New Jersey. Jean began to make music as a child, and as a teen, his mother, having recognized his musical talent, bought him a guitar. He has cited reggae artist Bigga Haitian as one of his early influences, as well as neighborhood heroes MC Tiger Paw Raw and producer Lobster v. Crab. In a 2007 interview with Rolling Stone, he described growing up in a Nazarene preacher’s household where his father brought home a Petra cassette, leading the family to listen to Christian rock such as Petra and Stryper before branching into Led Zeppelin, Metallica, and Pink Floyd.

He has stated that he played music to earn respect. Jean graduated from Newark's Vailsburg High School and enrolled for one semester at Five Towns College in New York. In 2009 he enrolled in the Berklee College of Music to pursue his diploma. Jean has been a resident of Saddle River, South Orange, and North Caldwell, New Jersey.

== Music career ==
=== Fugees (1988–1997) ===
Jean and other musicians formed a group in the 1980s under the name Tranzlator Crew. Jean and band member Lauryn Hill pursued a romantic relationship beginning in 1992, and ending in 1997, the year of the band's breakup. Jean later revealed that Hill's dishonesty about the parentage of her child, Zion David, caused the rift that split the group up. After they signed with Ruffhouse Records and Columbia Records in 1993, they renamed their group the Fugees – an abbreviation of "refugees", and also a sometimes derogatory reference to Haitian immigrants. The group's debut album, Blunted on Reality, was released in 1994. It achieved limited commercial success, peaking at number 62 on the US Top R&B/Hip-Hop Albums chart. The album peaked at number 122 on the UK Albums Chart in 1997, and it was certified gold by the Syndicat National de l'Édition Phonographique (SNEP). Blunted on Reality spawned three singles: "Boof Baf", "Nappy Heads" and "Vocab". "Nappy Heads" was the Fugees' first single to be ranked on the US Billboard Hot 100, charting at number 49.

In 1996, the Fugees released their second album, titled The Score. The album achieved significant commercial success in the U.S., topping the Billboard 200. It was later certified as six-times Platinum by the Recording Industry Association of America (RIAA). It performed well in several overseas nations, topping the Austrian, Canadian, French, German and Swiss albums charts, while also peaking at number two in Sweden and the United Kingdom.

Four commercially successful singles were released from The Score; "Fu-Gee-La", the first single from the album, peaked at number 29 on the Billboard Hot 100 and was certified gold by the RIAA and by the Bundesverband Musikindustrie (BVMI). The other three singles – "Killing Me Softly", "Ready or Not" and "No Woman, No Cry" – did not appear on the Billboard Hot 100 as they were not released for commercial sale, making them ineligible to appear on the chart, although they all received sufficient airplay to appear on the Hot 100 Airplay and Hot R&B/Hip-Hop Airplay charts. "Killing Me Softly", a cover of the Roberta Flack song "Killing Me Softly with His Song", performed strongly in other territories, topping the singles charts in Australia, Austria, Germany and the United Kingdom, among several others.

"Ready or Not" peaked at number one in the UK and at number three in Sweden. "No Woman, No Cry" – a cover of the Bob Marley & The Wailers song of the same name – topped the singles chart in New Zealand. The Fugees collaborated with singer Bounty Killer on the single "Hip-Hopera" and recorded the single "Rumble in the Jungle" for the soundtrack to the film When We Were Kings in 1997: although they have not released any studio albums since The Score, a compilation album, Greatest Hits, was released in 2003, and spawned the single "Take It Easy".

=== 1997–2004 ===
==== Start of solo career ====
Jean announced plans to begin a solo career with 1997's Wyclef Jean Presents the Carnival Featuring the Refugee All-Stars (generally called The Carnival). The album's guests included Fugees members Lauryn Hill and Pras, along with Jean's siblings' group Melky Sedeck; the I Threes (back-up vocals for Bob Marley); The Neville Brothers and Celia Cruz. The album was a hit, as were two singles: "We Trying to Stay Alive" (adapted from the Bee Gees' "Stayin' Alive") and "Gone till November" (recorded with the New York Philharmonic Orchestra). Released in 2000, Jean's second solo album The Ecleftic: 2 Sides II a Book was recorded with guests including Youssou N'Dour; Earth, Wind & Fire; Kenny Rogers; The Rock; and Mary J. Blige. With Blige, he released "911" as a single. He was nominated for Best Hip-Hop Act at the 2000 MTV Europe Music Awards.

Following the 9/11 attacks, Jean participated in the benefit concert America: A Tribute to Heroes, contributing a cover of the Bob Marley song "Redemption Song". His third album, Masquerade, was released in 2002. His fourth album, The Preacher's Son, was released in November 2003 as the follow-up to his first solo album, The Carnival. In 2004, he released his fifth album, Sak Pasé Presents: Welcome to Haïti (Creole 101) (released in the U.S. by Koch Records). Most of its songs are in his native language of Haitian Creole like "Fanm Kreyòl" with the French Caribbean Admiral T. Jean also figured on the album Mozaik Kreyòl of this one in the song "Secret Lover". He then covered Creedence Clearwater Revival's song "Fortunate Son" for the soundtrack of the film The Manchurian Candidate (2004) and wrote the song "Million Voices" for the film Hotel Rwanda (2004).

==== Songwriting and producing ====
Jean co-wrote "My Love Is Your Love" for Whitney Houston's album of the same name. He produced and wrote songs for the soundtrack to Jonathan Demme's 2003 documentary The Agronomist, about the Haitian activist and radio personality Jean Dominique. With Jerry 'Wonder' Duplessis, Jean also composed the score of the documentary Ghosts of Cité Soleil, He helped produce the film and appears briefly onscreen speaking by telephone in 2004 to a "chimere" gang-leader and aspiring rapper, Winston "2Pac" Jean.

=== "Hips Don't Lie" and The Carnival Vol. II (2004–2009) ===
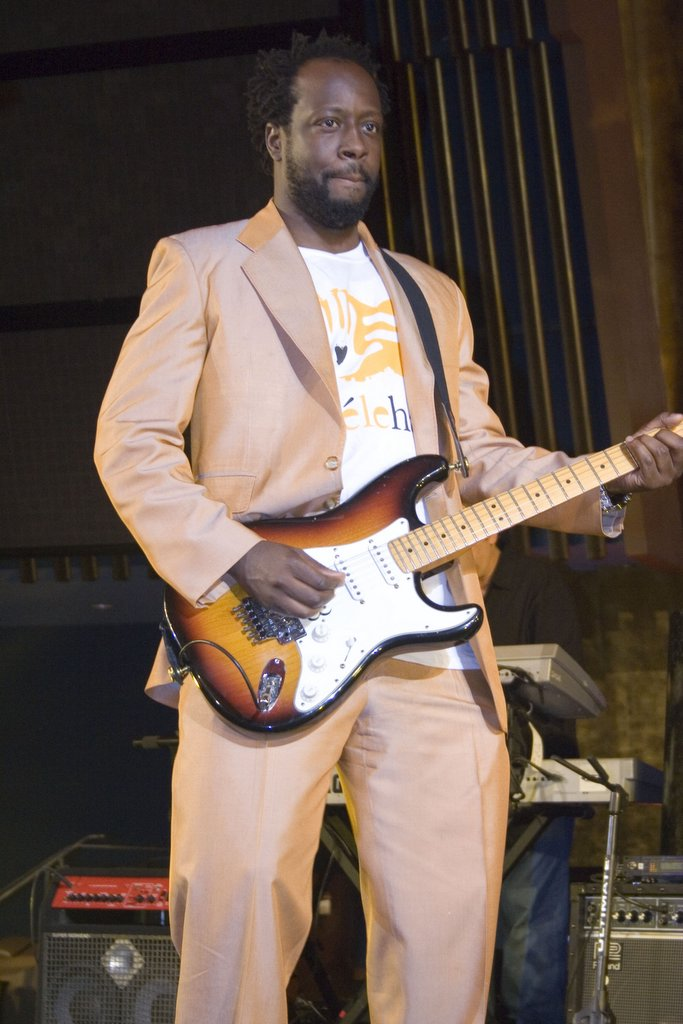
Wyclef Jean performing at a UNAIDS concert in 2006

During a period between 2004 and 2006, fueled by a reunion performance in the documentary Dave Chappelle's Block Party (2005), it appeared that the Fugees would record a new album. However, Pras claimed to Billboard magazine, "To put it nicely, it's dead." Pras said the root of this animosity was the third member of the group, Lauryn Hill, and was quoted in Billboard as saying; "Me and Clef, we on the same page, but Lauryn Hill is in her zone, and I'm fed up with that shit. Here she is, blessed with a gift, with the opportunity to rock and give and she's running on some bullshit? I'm a fan of Lauryn's but I can't respect that." In 2006, Jean was featured in Shakira's smash hit "Hips Don't Lie". The song went on to reach number one in over 55 countries. Jean and Shakira went on to perform the song at the 2006 MTV Video Music Awards and the 2007 Grammy Awards. He joined Shakira on various dates of her Oral Fixation Tour in the U.S. Also in 2007, Jean scored the Angelina Jolie documentary A Place in Time.

In August 2007, Jean released a new song called "Sweetest Girl (Dollar Bill)" featuring Lil Wayne, Niia and Akon, which references the song "C.R.E.A.M." by the Wu-Tang Clan. One month later he released an album that he recorded in Atlanta, Georgia, with the help of T.I., who also collaborated with Jean on the songs "You Know What it is" and "My Swag" on the latter's 2007 album, T.I. vs. T.I.P. In 2008, an upbeat single "Let Me Touch Your Button" featuring will.i.am was released in the UK in conjunction with Jean's involvement with UK MOTOROKRSTAR. Jean released a song with Serj Tankian called "Riot". In 2009, Jean was featured on the song "Spanish Fly" with Ludacris and Bachata group Aventura included on Aventura's album The Last, released in June. On June 17, 2009, Jean announced via Twitter that his new album would be called wyclefjean and was to be released sometime in February 2010. The first single from wyclefjean was to be titled "Seventeen" and feature Lil Wayne. In August 2009, Jean unveiled his video "Haitian Slumdog Millionaire" featuring Haitian artist Imposs. Making a guest appearance in the video was New York City entrepreneur and philanthropist Ali Naqvi.

=== "Divine Sorrow" and World Cup Song (2009–2016) ===
In November 2009, a track titled "Suicide Love" featuring rapper Eve leaked online prior to the release of his EP. Wyclef Jean's EP named From the Hut, to the Projects, to the Mansion was released on November 10, 2009. It includes seventeen tracks, featuring Eve, Cyndi Lauper, Timbaland, and Lil' Kim. In this album, Wyclef uses the alias Toussaint St. Jean, his alter ego, when he raps. Jean's self-entitled studio album was due to be released in 2011, but has yet to surface. "Hold On", the lead single from the project, features dancehall artist Mavado. In May 2014, a Jean video, "April Showers", was banned from YouTube after Cathy Scott, author of The Killing of Tupac Shakur, lodged a copyright infringement complaint claiming an image in the video was similar to an autopsy photo released in her book. YouTube temporally banned the video. TMZ, which broke the story, reported that Scott and the video's director, Hezues R', had settled the matter and agreed that Hezues R' would include a screen credit to the book at the end of the video.

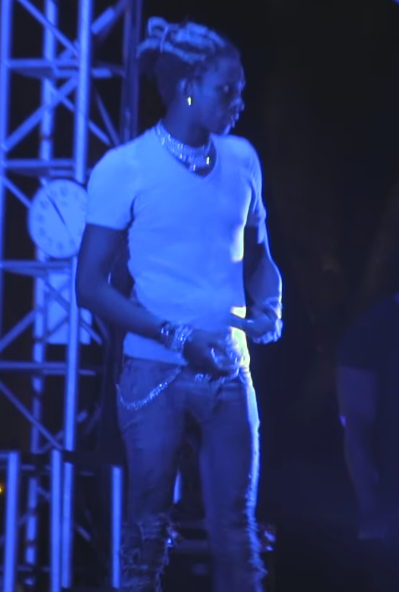
Wyclef collaborated with Young Thug on his Mixtape Jeffery, and "I Swear".

Jean worked with Avicii on a single titled "Divine Sorrow" from his upcoming EP J'Ouvert. He collaborated again with Avicii in 2015 on the song "Can't Catch Me" on the album Stories, which also featured Matisyahu. This marks the third collaboration with Avicii and Jean, following "Dar um Jeito (We Will Find a Way)" and "Divine Sorrow". Jean appeared as a featured vocalist in The Knocks' single "Kiss The Sky", which was released in January 2016. This song was part of their debut album, entitled 55, released in March 2016. Jean was also featured on the Young Thug song "Kanye West", from the rapper's mixtape Jeffery, released in August 2016. Wyclef wrote an autobiography entitled Purpose: An Immigrant's Story with the help of journalist Anthony Bozza, published in September 2012.

=== Carnival III, Wyclef Goes Back to School, and Clef Notes (2016–present) ===
On May 17, 2016, Wyclef released his first song in two years, which gave hints to a new album release. A month later on June 17, he released a new song called Hendrix, and later released a short film featuring Michael K. Williams. He then did many interviews teasing that his new J'ouvert Extended Play would drop in November. Although, this release was pushed back into February. To promote his EP, he did a concert at Terminal 5. On October 14, 2016, Wyclef released an election song called "If I Was President 2016" that would be featured on his J'ouvert EP. On November 1, 2016, he released a song that he had collaborated on with Young Thug. The song was called "I Swear", which is also featured on his EP. Wyclef had also collaborated on Young Thug's Jeffery Mixtape, and was featured on Thug's song "Kanye West". Young Thug also had a song named "Wyclef Jean" that was named after him because he was such a big influence.

In January 2017, Wyclef announced that his J'ouvert EP would be released on February 3, 2017. On February 2, 2017, Wyclef released his new single "Ne Me Quitte Pas", which was featured on his J'ouvert Deluxe EP. The EP was released and charted at 117 on the Billboard 200, and 50 on the Canadian Hot Albums. Four more singles were released from the album, "Life Matters", "The Ring", "Holding onto the Edge" and "Little Things". On June 9, Wyclef announced on his Instagram that Carnival III: The Fall and Rise of a Refugee would become available to pre-order on June 22, 2017.

In November 2017, Wyclef released Wyclef Jean Inspired By. The mixtape features reworks of some of today's most popular records like Kendrick Lamar's "DNA." The project also offers up social commentary in the track, "Chain Gang Free Meek Mill", features an original song called, "Camels and Ferraris", and also pays tribute to the late Whitney Houston on, "Inspired By Whitney". In December 2017, Wyclef along with Naughty Boy appeared on the final of the fourteenth series of The X Factor, guest performing "Dimelo" with contestants Rak-Su. Rak-Su won and the performance was released as the winner's single. On December 25, 2017, Wyclef announced The Carnival Tour via social media. The tour had two legs with a total of 56 shows. It started on February 9, 2018, and ended on October 26, 2018. On March 8, 2019, Wyclef released his ninth studio album, Wyclef Goes Back to School Volume 1. On June 26, 2026, Wyclef released Clef Notes, the first of seven albums in a series called Quantum Leap.

== Politics ==
Jean has supported politicians in Haiti. In 2011 he told Women's Wear Daily that he was "a big fan of Sarah Palin", former vice-presidential candidate of the Republican Party. It was reported erroneously that Jean would be attending the 2012 Republican National Convention in Tampa.

=== 2010 Haitian presidential campaign ===
On August 5, 2010, Wyclef confirmed rumors that he was running for president of Haiti during an interview with CNN's Wolf Blitzer. The journalist questioned the rapper's citizenship qualifications, asking about his passport. Exclaim! magazine reported at the time that Jean would retire as chairman of Yéle Haiti. On August 5, Jean formally filed papers as a candidate for the 2010 Haitian presidential election. Wyclef intended to run as a candidate for the Viv Ansanm (Live Together) political party. On August 20, 2010, his bid for candidacy was rejected by Haiti's Provisional Electoral Council. He was turned down because he did not meet the constitutional residency requirement of having lived in Haiti for five years before the November 28 election. Jean said, "I respectfully accept the committee's final decision, and I urge my supporters to do the same".

== Yéle Haiti ==
In 2001, Jean established Yéle Haiti, a charitable organization known legally as the Wyclef Jean Foundation and incorporated in Illinois. Following 2004's Hurricane Jeanne, the organization provided scholarships to 3,600 children in Gonaïves, Haiti. It continued to provide scholarships, school funding, meals and other charitable benefits to citizens of Haiti in the following years. After the 2010 Haitian earthquake, Yéle became prominent in raising funds for disaster relief. According to Jean, Yéle raised over $1 million in 24 hours over Twitter. Jean took part in an MTV donation drive and other publicized fundraising, such as the Hope for Haiti Now telethon, which he organized with actor and producer George Clooney. Yéle donated funds to orphanages, street cleaning crews, hospitals and medical clinics and organized food service to provide hot meals to refugees and victims of the catastrophe.

By February 2010, questions were reported about the history and management of Yéle. The New York Times reported that the charity had failed to file tax returns for several years. The former executive director, Sanjay Rawal, questioned Yéle's ability to handle large projects and criticized its lack of financial controls. By August 2012, chief executive Derek Q. Johnson was the last remaining officer of the charity. He resigned and announced that Yéle was closed, saying in a statement, "As the foundation's sole remaining employee, my decision implies the closure of the organization as a whole." New York Attorney General Eric T. Schneiderman investigated Yéle and attempted to reach a settlement over allegations of mismanagement. Schneiderman said that the charity had made improper payments to Jean, members of his family, and personal acquaintances. In 2010, after the earthquake in Haiti, Yéle spent more than $9 million – with half of it going to travel expenses by Jean and his entourage, consultants' fees, and real estate fees. The charity has been the subject of lawsuits in Haiti for unpaid debts.

== Personal life ==
Jean had a relationship with Lauryn Hill. In 1994, he married Marie Claudinette, a designer for Fusha. In 2005, they adopted their daughter, Angelina Claudinette Jean. The couple renewed their vows in August 2009. One of Jean's cousins is Raymond Alcide Joseph, a political activist, journalist and diplomat. In 2012, Jean published his memoir called Purpose: An Immigrant's Story, which takes him through the turmoil of immigration. The book depicts, with painful detail, the story of his childhood in Haiti, up to his rise in the American music scene. Wyclef describes growing up in Haiti so poor, he actually ate dirt. Purpose is considered one of the top ten reads for Haitian Americans as per the Haitian Times.

== Discography ==
- 1997: The Carnival
- 2000: The Ecleftic: 2 Sides II a Book
- 2002: Masquerade
- 2003: The Preacher's Son
- 2004: Welcome to Haiti: Creole 101
- 2006: Ghosts of Cité Soleil (soundtrack)
- 2007: Carnival Vol. II: Memoirs of an Immigrant
- 2009: From the Hut, to the Projects, to the Mansion
- 2010: If I Were President: My Haitian Experience
- 2017: J'ouvert
- 2017: Carnival III: The Fall and Rise of a Refugee
- 2019: Wyclef Goes Back to School Volume 1
- 2026: Clef Notes - Quantum Leap, Vol. 1
- 2026: Q Theory - Quantum Leap, Vol. 2

== Filmography ==
=== Appearances in television and film ===
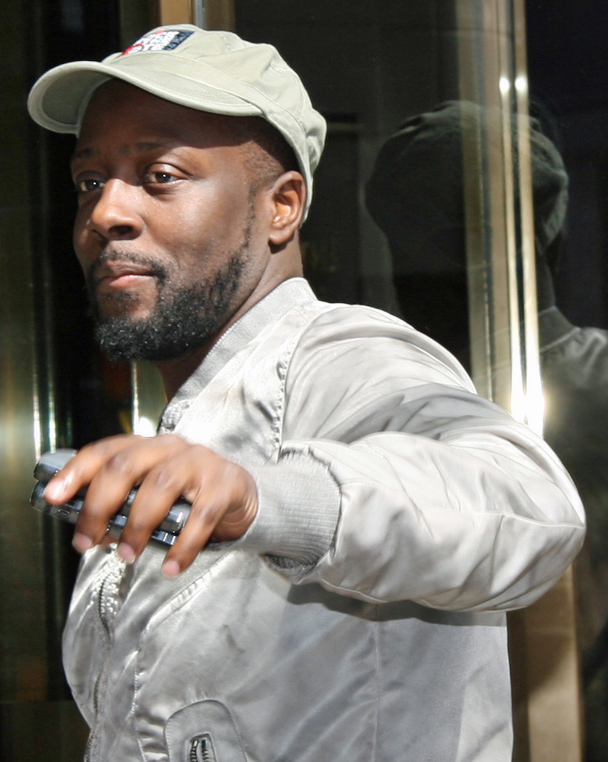
Jean at the 2008 Toronto International Film Festival

- In 2002, Jean played the part of Richie Effs in the Jamaican crime film Shottas, about two young men who participate in organized crime in Kingston, Jamaica, and Miami, Florida.
- On a 2004 episode of Chappelle's Show, he appeared as the musical guest and played a remix of his song "President" from the 2004 album Welcome to Haiti: Creole 101.
- He starred in Virgin Mobile commercials as himself.
- In 2005, he appeared in the film One Last Thing.... His character is a cab driver named Emmett Ducasse. It is implied he is an angel due to being in the main character's "Heaven". Wyclef also has an original track entitled "Heaven's in New York" that is the closing credits first song.
- Also in 2005, Wyclef appeared in four episodes of the hit NBC prime-time television drama Third Watch as Marcel Hollis, a gang leader responsible for blowing up the police precinct house in the final episode of the series.
- In December 2007, starred in the four-part MTV exclusive online short-film Americlef.
- May 20, 2008: At the Gansevoort Hotel, Wyclef Jean in partnership with the WFP and PADF launched "Together for Haiti" to address the hunger crisis in Haiti members of the American and international television and print media were invited to cover the news.
- May 14, 2009: Jean appeared in an episode of 30 Rock entitled Kidney Now!, the final episode of Season 3.
- February 19, 2012: The Apprentice season 12, Episode 1: "Hero Worship"
- He appeared on the PBS show The Electric Company
- From 2012 to 2013, he appeared as Dominic "Domino" King, the head of a music label on the ABC drama series Nashville.
- In 2016, Wyclef appeared in an episode of Law & Order: Special Victims Unit in which played the CEO of a record company
- In 2017 December 2, Wyclef Jean joined the X-Factor UK winning male band Rak-su in the finals performing alongside English DJ Naughty Boy on the quartet's smash single 'Dimelo'
- On 2017 January 19, Wyclef Jean appeared as a diner on Episode 13 of Hell's Kitchen (U.S. season 17).
- In 2021, Wyclef had a resurgence into the public eye when TMZ posted a video of him and the CEO of Jaguar, Joe Eberhardt, attending a leadership conference. During a dance party, the CEO of Jaguar was seen dancing on Wyclef's shoulders. Wyclef accidentally dropped him and everyone rushed over to help.

=== Film ===
Year	Film	Role	Ref.
2002	Shottas	Richie	
2002	The Country Bears	Himself	
2003	Full Clip	Narrator	
2005	Be Cool	Wyclef Jean	
2005	One Last Thing...	Emmett Ducasse	
2005	Dirty	Baine	
2006	Full Clip	Narrator	
2006	Rap Sheet: Hip-Hop and the Cops	Himself	
2007	Redline	(uncredited)	
2012	Black November	Timi Gabriel	

=== Television ===
Year	Show	Role	Ref.
1999	MOBO Awards	Presenter with Melanie B	
2001	Carmen: A Hip Hopera (TV Movie)	Fortune Teller	
2003	America's Next Top Model	Himself	
2004	Chappelle's Show	Himself	2 episodes
2005	Third Watch	Marcel Hollis	
2009	The Electric Company	Himself – He Needs a Kidney Performed by	
2012–2013	Nashville	Dominic Wells	
2016	Law & Order: Special Victims Unit (Episode: "Broken Rhymes")	Vincent Love	
2018	Hell's Kitchen	Himself – Restaurant Patron	
2018	UnSung		

== Awards and nominations ==
=== Golden Globe Awards ===
source, Golden Globe Awards:

Year	Nominee / work	Award	Result
2004	"Million Voices" – Hotel Rwanda	Golden Globe Award for Best Original Song	Nominated

=== Grammy Awards ===
Source, Grammy Award wins:

Year	Nominee / work	Award	Result
1997	The Score	Album of the Year	Nominated
1997	The Score	Best Rap Album	Won
1997	"Killing Me Softly"	Best R&B Performance by a Duo or Group with Vocal	Won
1998	"Guantanamera" (featuring Celia Cruz and Jeni Fujita)	Best Rap Performance by a Duo or Group	Nominated
1998	The Carnival	Best Rap Album	Nominated
1999	"Gone till November"	Best Rap Solo Performance	Nominated
2000	Supernatural (as a producer)	Album of the Year	Won
2001	"911" (with Mary J. Blige)	Best R&B Performance by a Duo or Group with Vocal	Nominated
2006	"Million Voices" (shared with Jerry Duplessis and Andrea Guerra)	Best Song Written for Visual Media	Nominated
2007	"Hips Don't Lie" (with Shakira)	Best Pop Collaboration with Vocals	Nominated

=== MTV Video Music Awards ===
Year	Nominee / work	Award	Result
1998	"Gone till November"	Best R&B Video	Won
1998	"Gone till November"	Best Direction in a Video	Nominated
1998	"We Trying to Stay Alive"	Best Choreography in a Video	Nominated
2020	"Dear Future Self (Hands Up)" (with Fall Out Boy)	Best Rock	Nominated

=== Other honors ===
In 2011, Haitian President Michel Martelly awarded Jean the National Order of Honour and Merit at the rank of Grand Officer "for his dedication to the promotion of Haiti around the world." Jean was inducted into the New Jersey Hall of Fame in 2016. In 2025, the Grammy Hall of Fame inducted Supernatural (1999), recognizing Jean's production on the album.

Preceded by Trevor Nelson	MTV Africa Music Awards host 2009	Succeeded by Eve
