= Fugees discography =

- Studio albums: 2
- Compilation albums: 3
- Singles: 10
- Music videos: 10
- Remix albums: 1

The discography of the Fugees, an American hip hop trio consisting of rapper/singer Lauryn Hill and rappers Pras Michel and Wyclef Jean, consists of two studio albums, three compilation albums, one remix album and nine singles (including one as featured artists) and nine music videos. After the group formed in the 1980s under the name Tranzlator Crew, they signed to Ruffhouse Records and Columbia Records in 1993; they then changed their name to Fugees – an abbreviation of "refugees", also a reference to Haitian immigrants.

The group's debut album, Blunted on Reality, was recorded in 1992 but not released until 1994. The album achieved limited commercial success, only peaking at number 62 on the US Top R&B/Hip-Hop Albums chart: however, it peaked at number 122 on the UK Albums Chart in 1997, and was certified gold by the Syndicat National de l'Édition Phonographique (SNEP). Blunted on Reality spawned three singles: "Boof Baf", "Nappy Heads" and "Vocab". "Nappy Heads" became their first single to appear on the US Billboard Hot 100, charting at number 49. In 1996, the Fugees released their second album, titled The Score. The album achieved significant commercial success in the United States, topping the US Billboard 200, and was later certified seven-times platinum by the Recording Industry Association of America (RIAA). And sold 22 million copies worldwide. It also performed well in several overseas territories, topping the Austrian, Canadian, French, German and Swiss albums charts, whilst also peaking at number two in Sweden and the United Kingdom.

Four commercially successful singles were released from The Score; "Fu-Gee-La", the first single from the album, peaked at number 29 on the Billboard Hot 100 and was certified gold by the RIAA and by the Bundesverband Musikindustrie (BVMI). The other three singles – "Killing Me Softly", "Ready or Not" and "No Woman, No Cry" – did not appear on the Billboard Hot 100 as they were not released for commercial sale, making them ineligible to appear on the chart, although they all received sufficient airplay to appear on the Hot 100 Airplay and Hot R&B/Hip-Hop Airplay charts. "Killing Me Softly", a cover of the Roberta Flack song "Killing Me Softly with His Song", performed strongly in other territories, topping the singles charts in Australia, Austria, Germany and the United Kingdom, among several others. "Ready or Not" also peaked at number one in the United Kingdom and number three in Sweden, and "No Woman, No Cry" – a cover of the Bob Marley & The Wailers song of the same name – topped the singles chart in New Zealand. Fugees collaborated with singer Bounty Killer on the single "Hip-Hopera" and recorded the single "Rumble in the Jungle" for the soundtrack to the film When We Were Kings in 1997. This song samples ABBA's "The Name of the Game" and thought to be the first time ABBA approved a sample of one of their songs.

Although they have not released any studio albums since The Score, a compilation album, Greatest Hits, was released in 2003, and spawned the single "Take It Easy".

== Albums ==
=== Studio albums ===
List of studio albums, with selected chart positions, sales figures and certifications
| Title | Album details | Peak chart positions | | | | | | | | | | Sales | Certifications |
| Title | Album details | US | US R&B | AUS | AUT | CAN | FRA | GER | SWE | SWI | UK | Sales | Certifications |
|---|---|---|---|---|---|---|---|---|---|---|---|---|---|
| Blunted on Reality | Released: January 25, 1994; Label: Ruffhouse, Columbia; Format: CD, LP, cassette, digital download | — | 62 | — | — | — | — | — | — | — | 122 | US: 130,000 | BPI: Silver; SNEP: Gold |
| The Score | Released: February 13, 1996; Label: Ruffhouse, Columbia; Format: CD, LP, cassette, MD, digital download | 1 | 1 | 5 | 1 | 1 | 1 | 1 | 2 | 1 | 2 | | RIAA: 7× Platinum; ARIA: Platinum; BPI: 5× Platinum; BVMI: 3× Gold; IFPI AUT: Platinum; IFPI SWE: Platinum; IFPI SWI: 2× Platinum; MC: 5× Platinum; SNEP: Diamond |
"—" denotes a recording that did not chart or was not released in that territory.

=== Compilation albums ===
List of compilation albums, with selected chart positions
| Title | Album details | Peak chart positions | | Certifications |
| Title | Album details | NZ | SWI | Certifications |
|---|---|---|---|---|
| Greatest Hits | Released: March 25, 2003; Label: Columbia; Format: CD, LP, cassette, digital download | 38 | 44 | BPI: Gold |
| This is the Fugees: The Greatest Hits | Released: September 7, 2010; Label: Sony; Format: CD, digital download | — | — | |
| Playlist: The Very Best of Fugees | Released: May 29, 2012; Label: Sony; Format: CD, digital download | — | — | |
"—" denotes a recording that did not chart or was not released in that territory.

=== Remix albums ===
List of remix albums, with selected chart positions
| Title | Album details | Peak chart positions | | | Certifications |
| Title | Album details | US | US R&B | UK | Certifications |
|---|---|---|---|---|---|
| Bootleg Versions | Released: November 26, 1996 (US); Label: Ruffhouse, Columbia; Format: CD, LP, cassette, digital download | 127 | 50 | 55 | BPI: Silver |

== Singles ==
=== As lead artist ===
List of singles as lead artist, with selected chart positions and certifications, showing year released and album name
| Title | Year | Peak chart positions | | | | | | | | | | | Certifications | Album |
| Title | Year | US | US R&B | US Rap | AUS | AUT | FRA | GER | NZ | SWE | SWI | UK | Certifications | Album |
|---|---|---|---|---|---|---|---|---|---|---|---|---|---|---|
| "Boof Baf" | 1993 | — | — | — | — | — | — | — | — | — | — | — | | Blunted on Reality |
| "Nappy Heads (Remix)" | 1994 | 49 | 52 | 12 | — | — | — | — | — | — | — | 172 | | Blunted on Reality |
| "Vocab" | 1994 | — (Note: "Vocab" did not enter the Billboard Hot 100, but peaked at number eight on the Bubbling Under Hot 100 Singles chart, which acts as an extension to the Hot 100.) | 91 | 22 | — | — | — | — | — | — | — | — | | Blunted on Reality |
| "Fu-Gee-La" | 1995 | 29 | 13 | 2 | 43 | 14 | 22 | 6 | 11 | 10 | 9 | 21 | RIAA: Platinum; BPI: Silver; BVMI: Gold | The Score |
| "Killing Me Softly" | 1996 | — (Note: "Killing Me Softly" did not enter the Billboard Hot 100, as they were not released for commercial sale, but peaked at number 2 on the Hot 100 Airplay chart.) | — (Note: "Killing Me Softly" did not enter the Hot R&B/Hip-Hop Songs chart, but peaked at number 1 on the Hot R&B/Hip-Hop Airplay chart.) | — | 1 | 1 | 1 | 1 | 1 | 1 | 1 | 1 | RIAA: 3× Platinum; ARIA: 3× Platinum; BPI: 3× Platinum; BVMI: 2× Platinum; IFPI AUT: Platinum; IFPI SWE: Platinum; IFPI SWI: Gold; SNEP: Platinum | The Score |
| "Ready or Not" | 1996 | — (Note: "Ready or Not" did not enter the Billboard Hot 100, as they were not released for commercial sale, but peaked at number 69 on the Hot 100 Airplay chart.) | — (Note: "Ready or Not" did not enter the Hot R&B/Hip-Hop Songs chart, but peaked at number 22 on the Hot R&B/Hip-Hop Airplay chart.) | — | 24 | 17 | 128 | 8 | 8 | 3 | 23 | 1 | RIAA: Platinum; BPI: 2× Platinum; BVMI: Gold | The Score |
| "No Woman, No Cry" | 1996 | — (Note: "No Woman, No Cry" did not enter the Billboard Hot 100, as they were not released for commercial sale, but peaked at number 38 on the Hot 100 Airplay chart.) | — (Note: "No Woman, No Cry" did not enter the Hot R&B/Hip-Hop Songs chart, but peaked at number 58 on the Hot R&B/Hip-Hop Airplay chart.) | — | 20 | 40 | 12 | 33 | 1 | 14 | 23 | 2 | BPI: Silver; SNEP: Gold | The Score |
| "Rumble in the Jungle" (featuring A Tribe Called Quest, Busta Rhymes and John Forté) | 1997 | — | — (Note: "Rumble in the Jungle" did not enter the Hot R&B/Hip-Hop Songs chart, but peaked at number 71 on the Hot R&B/Hip-Hop Airplay chart.) | — | 94 | — | — | 85 | 13 | 36 | — | 3 | | When We Were Kings (soundtrack) |
| "Take It Easy" | 2005 | — (Note: "Take It Easy" did not enter the Billboard Hot 100, but peaked at number 19 on the Bubbling Under Hot 100 Singles chart, which acts as an extension to the Hot 100.) | 40 | — | — | — | — | — | — | — | — | — | | —N/a |
"—" denotes a recording that did not chart or was not released in that territory.

=== As featured artist ===
List of singles as featured artist, with selected chart positions, showing year released and album name
| Title | Year | Peak chart positions | | | Album |
| Title | Year | US | US R&B | US Rap | Album |
|---|---|---|---|---|---|
| "Hip-Hopera" (Bounty Killer featuring Fugees) | 1996 | 81 | 54 | 14 | My Xperience |

== Guest appearances ==
List of non-single guest appearances, with other performing artists, showing year released and album name
| Title | Year | Other performer(s) | Album |
|---|---|---|---|
| "Freestyle" | 1995 | Funkmaster Flex | The Mix Tape, Vol. 1 |
| "Recognition" | 1995 | —N/a | Pump Ya Fist: Music Inspired by the Black Panthers |
| "Look What You've Done" (Refugee Camp Remix) | 1995 | Asante | 12" |
| "Boom Biddy Bye Bye" (Fugees Remix) | 1996 | Cypress Hill | Unreleased and Revamped |
| "Allies" | 1996 | Poor Righteous Teachers | The New World Order |
| "Just Happy to Be Me" | 1998 | none | Elmopalooza! soundtrack |

== Music videos ==
=== As lead artist ===
List of music videos as lead artist, with directors, showing year released
| Title | Year | Director(s) |
|---|---|---|
| "Boof Baf" | 1993 | Rich Murray |
| "Nappy Heads (Remix)" | 1994 | Max Malkin |
| "Vocab" | 1994 | Max Malkin |
| "Fu-Gee-La" | 1995 | Guy Guillet |
| "Killing Me Softly" | 1996 | Aswad Ayinde |
| "Ready or Not" | 1996 | Marcus Nispel |
| "Cowboys" (featuring Outsidaz) | 1996 | ? |
| "No Woman, No Cry" | 1996 | Wyclef Jean |
| "Rumble in the Jungle" (with A Tribe Called Quest, Busta Rhymes and John Forté) | 1997 | Marc Smerling, Mark Woollen |
| "Just Happy to Be Me" | 1998 | ? |

=== As featured artist ===
List of music videos as featured artist, with directors, showing year released
| Title | Year | Director(s) |
|---|---|---|
| "Hip-Hopera" (Bounty Killer featuring Fugees) | 1996 | Michael Lucero |
| "Boom Biddy Bye Bye (Fugees Remix) (Cypress Hill featuring Fugees) | 1996 | ? |
