= Greatest Hits (Fugees album) =

Greatest hits album by Fugees
- Released: March 25, 2003
- Recorded: 1993–2003
- Genres: Hip-hop; hip-hop soul; reggae; R&B
- Length: 43:37
- Label: Columbia
- Producer: Wyclef Jean

Fugees chronology
Bootleg Versions (1996)	Greatest Hits (2003)

Professional ratings
Review scores
Source	Rating
Allmusic	3/5 stars

Greatest Hits is a compilation released by American hip-hop trio, the Fugees. The album was released on March 25, 2003, by the group's former record label, Columbia Records. The band had long since split at the time of the album's release, although renewed interest sparked them to record and release a single, "Take it Easy", in 2005, the first official release from the trio since 1997.

The album features the majority of the group's singles discography (omitting only "Boof Baf" and "Rumble in the Jungle") and fan favourites, as well as Refugee Camp All-Stars and Lauryn Hill's "The Sweetest Thing" from the soundtrack for Love Jones (1997). The European edition re-arranges the tracklisting, and includes three additional tracks, including a BBC Radio 1 live lounge session and a live version of "Killing Me Softly".

== Track listing ==
US/Canadian tracklisting
No.	Title	Writer(s)	Producer(s)	Length
1.	"Vocab" (Refugees Hip Hop remix)	Jean; Michel; Hill		4:02
2.	"Nappy Heads" (remix radio edit)	Jean; Michel; Hill		4:38
3.	"Fu-Gee-La"	Jean; Michel; Hill; Salaam Remi; Mary Brockert; Allen McGrier	Salaam Remi	4:20
4.	"How Many Mics"	Jean; Michel; Hill	Wyclef; Shawn King; Hill; Prakazrel "Pras"^{[a]}; Jerry "Te Bass" Duplessis^{[a]}	4:28
5.	"Killing Me Softly"	Charles Fox; Norman Gimbel	Wyclef; Hill; Pras^{[a]}; Te Bass^{[a]}	4:58
6.	"No Woman, No Cry"	Vincent Ford	Wyclef; Hill; Pras^{[a]}; Te Bass^{[a]}	4:33
7.	"Cowboys" (featuring the Outsidaz)	Jean; Michel; Hill; Jerome Hinds; Dewayne Battle; Rashia Fisher; Forté	Wyclef; Hill; Forté; Pras^{[a]}; Te Bass^{[a]}	5:23
8.	"The Score" (featuring Diamond D)	Jean; Michel; Hill; Joseph Kirkland	Diamond D; Wyclef^{[a]}; Hill^{[a]}; Pras^{[a]}; Te Bass^{[a]}	5:02
9.	"The Sweetest Thing" (Mahogany mix) (Lauryn Hill featuring Refugee Camp All-Stars)	Jean; Hill; DeVorzon		4:24
10.	"Ready or Not" (Salaam's Ready for the Show remix)	Jean; Michel; Hill; Thom Bell; William Hart; Enya; Nicholas Ryan; Roma Ryan	Salaam Remi	4:22

Japan bonus tracks
No.	Title	Writer(s)	Producer(s)	Length
11.	"Fu-Gee-La" (North Side mix)	Jean; Michel; Hill; Salaam Remi; Mary Brockert; Allen McGrier	Northside	4:17
12.	"Killing Me Softly" (Sound Barrier mix)	Charles Fox; Norman Gimbel	Wyclef; Hill; Pras^{[a]}; Te Bass^{[a]}	4:20
13.	"Ready or Not" (Clark Kent/Django remix)	Jean; Michel; Thom Bell; William Hart; Hill; Enya; Nicholas Ryan; Roma Ryan	Clark Kent	5:18
14.	"The Sweetest Thing" (Lauryn Hill featuring Refugee Camp All-Stars)	Jean; Hill; DeVorzon		4:51

European tracklisting
No.	Title	Writer(s)	Producer(s)	Length
1.	"Fu-Gee-La"	Jean; Michel; Hill; Salaam Remi; Mary Brockert; Allen McGrier	Salaam Remi	4:20
2.	"No Woman, No Cry"	Vincent Ford	Wyclef; Hill; Pras^{[a]}; Te Bass^{[a]}	4:33
3.	"Ready or Not"	Jean; Michel; Thom Bell; William Hart; Hill; Enya; Nicholas Ryan; Roma Ryan	Wyclef; Hill; Pras^{[a]}; Te Bass^{[a]}	3:47
4.	"Killing Me Softly"	Charles Fox; Norman Gimbel	Wyclef; Hill; Pras^{[a]}; Te Bass^{[a]}	4:58
5.	"The Score" (featuring Diamond D)	Jean; Michel; Hill; Joseph Kirkland	Diamond D; Wyclef^{[a]}; Hill^{[a]}; Pras^{[a]}; Te Bass^{[a]}	5:02
6.	"How Many Mics"	Jean; Michel; Hill	Wyclef; Shawn King; Hill; Prakazrel "Pras"^{[a]}; Jerry "Te Bass" Duplessis^{[a]}	4:28
7.	"Cowboys" (featuring the Outsidaz)	Jean; Michel; Hill; Jerome Hinds; Dewayne Battle; Rashia Fisher; Forté	Wyclef; Hill; Forté; Pras^{[a]}; Te Bass^{[a]}	5:23
8.	"Nappy Heads" (remix radio edit)	Jean; Michel; Hill		4:38
9.	"Vocab" (Refugees Hip Hop remix)	Jean; Michel; Hill		4:02
10.	"The Sweetest Thing" (Mahogany mix) (Lauryn Hill featuring Refugee Camp All-Stars)	Jean; Hill; DeVorzon		4:24
11.	"A Change Is Gonna Come" (BBC Radio 1 live lounge)	Sam Cooke		2:47
12.	"Killing Me Softly" (Live from MCM)	Charles Fox; Norman Gimbel	Wyclef; Hill; Pras^{[a]}; Te Bass^{[a]}	4:35
13.	"Freestyle" (BBC Radio 1 live lounge)	Jean; Michel; Hill		4:59

European deluxe bonus disc
No.	Title	Writer(s)	Producer(s)	Length
1.	"Ready or Not" (Clark Kent remix)	Jean; Michel; Thom Bell; William Hart; Hill; Enya; Nicholas Ryan; Roma Ryan	Clark Kent	4:02
2.	"Ready or Not" (Salaam's Ready for the Show remix)	Jean; Michel; Thom Bell; William Hart; Hill; Enya; Nicholas Ryan; Roma Ryan	Salaam Remi	4:22
3.	"Fu-Gee-La" (Refugee Camp remix)	Jean; Michel; Hill; Salaam Remi; Mary Brockert; Allen McGrier	Remi	4:17
4.	"Fu-Gee-La" (Sly & Robbie remix)	Jean; Michel; Hill; Salaam Remi; Mary Brockert; Allen McGrier	Sly & Robbie	5:35
5.	"Killing Me Softly" (Sound Barrier mix)	Charles Fox; Norman Gimbel	Wyclef; Hill; Pras^{[a]}; Te Bass^{[a]}	4:20
6.	"No Woman, No Cry" (Remix featuring Steve Marley)	Vincent Ford	Wyclef; Hill; Pras^{[a]}; Te Bass^{[a]}	4:39

== Charts ==
Chart (2003)	Peak position
Japanese Albums (Oricon)	30
New Zealand Albums (RMNZ)	38
Swiss Albums (Schweizer Hitparade)	44

== Certifications ==
Certifications for Greatest Hits
Region	Certification	Certified units/sales
United Kingdom (BPI)	Gold	100,000^{‡}
^{‡} Sales+streaming figures based on certification alone.
