= Bootleg Versions =

Remix album by The Fugees
- Released: November 26, 1996
- Recorded: 1993–1996
- Genre: Hip-hop; reggae
- Length: 38:29
- Label: Ruffhouse/Columbia
- Producer: Clark Kent, Prakazrel, Salaam Remi, Lauryn Hill, Steve Marley, Te-Bass Productions, Phil Nicolo, Wyclef Jean

The Fugees chronology
The Score (1996)	Bootleg Versions (1996)	Greatest Hits (2003)

Professional ratings
Review scores
Source	Rating
Allmusic	3/5 stars

Bootleg Versions is a remix album released by R&B and Reggae Fusion group The Fugees. The album was released on November 26, 1996. The album features only eight tracks, including seven remixes, and one new recording. The album along with their previous album, The Score, was later re-issued in 2001, as a double album, "The Complete Score" and in 2011, the two albums along with their first, Blunted on Reality was released as a 3-CD box set, "Original Album Classics". The album peaked at #127 on the Billboard 200 in the United States.

== Track listing ==
1. "Ready or Not" (Clark Kent/Django Remix) (Hill, Jean, Michel, Lewis) – 5:17
2. "Nappy Heads" (Mad Spider Mix) (Hill, Jean, Michel) – 4:27
3. "Don't Cry Dry Your Eyes" (Hill, Jean, Michel) – 4:15
4. "Vocab" (Salaam's Remix) (Hill, Jean, Michel) – 7:00
5. "Ready or Not" (Salaam's Ready For The Show Remix) (Hill, Jean, Michel) – 4:42
6. "Killing Me Softly" (Live At The Brixton Academy) (Fox, Gimbel) – 2:41
7. "No Woman, No Cry" (Stephen Marley Remix) (Ford, Marley) – 5:27
8. "Vocab" (Refugees Hip Hop Remix) (Hill, Jean, Michel) – 4:38

== Charts ==
Chart (1996)	Peak position
UK Albums (OCC)	55
UK R&B Albums (OCC)	9
US Billboard 200	127
US Top R&B/Hip-Hop Albums (Billboard)	50

== Certifications ==
Region	Certification	Certified units/sales
United Kingdom (BPI)	Silver	60,000^{‡}
^{‡} Sales+streaming figures based on certification alone.
