= Rumble in the Jungle (song) =

1997 single by Fugees

Single by Fugees featuring A Tribe Called Quest, Busta Rhymes and John Forté

from the album When We Were Kings soundtrack
- Released: January 7, 1997
- Recorded: 1996
- Length: 5:09
- Label: Mercury
- Songwriters: Wyclef Jean; Prakazrel Michel; Lauryn Hill; Benny Andersson; Björn Ulvaeus; Stig Anderson; Chip Taylor; Kamaal Fareed; Malik Taylor; Trevor Smith; John Forté
- Producers: Wyclef Jean; Lauryn Hill

Fugees singles chronology
"No Woman, No Cry" (1996)	"Rumble in the Jungle" (1997)	"Take It Easy" (2005)

A Tribe Called Quest singles chronology
"Stressed Out" (1996)	"Rumble in the Jungle" (1997)	"Jam" (1997)

Busta Rhymes singles chronology
"Hit 'Em High (The Monstars' Anthem)" (1996)	"Rumble in the Jungle" (1997)	"Do My Thing" (1997)

Music video
- "Rumble in the Jungle" on YouTube

"Rumble in the Jungle" is a song recorded for the 1996 documentary film When We Were Kings, depicting the 1974 boxing match between Muhammad Ali and George Foreman. The track was written and performed by Fugees alongside A Tribe Called Quest, Busta Rhymes, and John Forté. The song samples the bassline from ABBA's "The Name of the Game" and interpolates "Angel of the Morning" written by Chip Taylor.

"Rumble in the Jungle" was released on January 7, 1997, as the first single from the soundtrack and became a chart hit in several countries. In the United Kingdom, it peaked at number three on the UK Singles Chart, becoming the Fugees' fourth consecutive top-three hit. It also reached the top 40 in Finland, Iceland, Ireland, New Zealand, and Sweden. In the United States, it peaked at number 71 on the US Billboard Hot R&B Airplay chart.

== Background and writing ==
"Rumble in the Jungle" was written for the 1996 documentary film When We Were Kings, which focuses on American boxer Muhammad Ali and the buildup to the 1974 Rumble in the Jungle boxing match with George Foreman, which took place in Kinshasa, Zaire. The song was written by Fugees members Wyclef Jean, Pras, and Lauryn Hill along with guest vocalists Busta Rhymes, John Forté, and A Tribe Called Quest members Q-Tip and Phife Dawg; Jean and Hill additionally produced the song.

The song's bassline is taken from "The Name of the Game" (1977) by Swedish pop group ABBA, so Benny Andersson, Björn Ulvaeus, and Stig Anderson are given writing credits; this was the first time ABBA had granted permission to officially sample one of their recordings, a decision Andersson later attributed to the group's admiration for Hill. One of Hill's verses is also based on "Angel of the Morning", penned by Chip Taylor in 1967. "Rumble in the Jungle" is about Ali's background and his fight with Foreman, containing descriptions of inner-city life, and plays during the biopic's closing credits.

== Release and promotion ==
The song was serviced to American rhythmic contemporary radio on January 7, 1997. On January 25, 1997, it debuted and peaked at number 71 on the Billboard Hot R&B Airplay chart. In the United Kingdom, a re-issue of "Fu-Gee-La" was originally scheduled for release, but once the film and song were released in America, import copies began to permeate the British music market, eventually selling enough units to appear at number 81 on the UK Singles Chart. This threatened the potential sales of "Fu-Gee-La", so its release was suspended to allow for the proper release of "Rumble in the Jungle" on March 3, 1997. The song subsequently reappeared on the UK Singles Chart, entering at number three to become the Fugees' fourth consecutive top-three hit. Elsewhere in Europe, the song peaked at number 10 in Ireland, number 12 in Iceland, number 13 in Finland, and number 36 in Sweden. In Oceania, the song reached the top 20 in New Zealand, peaking at number 13 on June 1, 1997.

== Music video ==
A music video directed by Marc Smerling and Mark Woollen was made for the song. It features snippets from the film interspersed with clips of the seven vocalists rapping the song in a boxing ring. The video premiered on MTV worldwide on January 14, 1997. It was subsequently added to MTV2's playlists on the week ending January 19 and to The Box's playlists the following week.

== Track listings ==
UK and Australian CD single

1. "Rumble in the Jungle" (edit) – 4:16
2. "Rumble in the Jungle" (full length) – 5:09
3. "I'm So Mean I Make Medicine Sick" (Muhammad Ali snippet) – 0:25
4. "Rumble in the Jungle" (a cappella) – 4:48

European CD and cassette single

1. "Rumble in the Jungle" (edit) – 4:16
2. "Rumble in the Jungle" (full length) – 5:09

== Personnel ==
Personnel are lifted from the US promo CD liner notes.

- Wyclef Jean – writing, production
- Lauryn Hill – writing, production
- Prakazrel Michel – writing
- Kamaal Fareed – writing
- Malik Taylor – writing
- Trevor Smith – writing
- John Forté – writing
- Benny Andersson – writing ("The Name of the Game")
- Björn Ulvaeus – writing ("The Name of the Game")
- Stig Anderson – writing ("The Name of the Game")
- Chip Taylor – writing ("Angel of the Morning")
- Warren Riker – engineering, mixing

== Charts ==
=== Weekly charts ===
Chart (1997)	Peak position
Australia (ARIA)	94
Belgium (Ultratip Bubbling Under Flanders)	7
Europe (Eurochart Hot 100)	22
Finland (Suomen virallinen lista)	13
Germany (GfK)	85
Iceland (Íslenski Listinn Topp 40)	12
Ireland (IRMA)	10
Netherlands (Dutch Top 40 Tipparade)	17
New Zealand (Recorded Music NZ)	13
Scotland Singles (OCC)	8
Sweden (Sverigetopplistan)	36
UK Singles (OCC)	3
UK Dance (OCC)	2
UK Hip Hop/R&B (OCC)	1
US R&B/Hip-Hop Airplay (Billboard)	71
US Hip Hop Top 20 (Radio & Records)	12

=== Year-end charts ===
Chart (1997)	Position
UK Singles (OCC)	76

== Release history ==
Region	Date	Format(s)	Label(s)	Ref.
United States	January 7, 1997	Rhythmic contemporary radio	Mercury	
United Kingdom	March 3, 1997	12-inch vinyl; CD; cassette	Mercury	
