= The Score (album) =

Studio album by Fugees
- Released: February 13, 1996
- Recorded: June–November 1995
- Studios: Booga Basement (East Orange); The Crib (New York)
- Genres: East Coast hip-hop; alternative hip-hop; progressive rap
- Length: 60:52
- Labels: Ruffhouse; Columbia
- Producers: Wyclef Jean; Lauryn Hill; Pras; Jerry "Te Bass" Duplessis; Diamond D; John Forté; Shawn King; Warren Riker; Salaam Remi

Fugees chronology
Blunted on Reality (1994)	The Score (1996)	Bootleg Versions (1996)

Singles from The Score
- 1. "Fu-Gee-La" Released: December 13, 1995; 2. "Killing Me Softly" Released: May 27, 1996; 3. "Ready or Not" Released: September 1, 1996; 4. "No Woman, No Cry" Released: November 18, 1996

The Score is the second and final studio album by American hip-hop group Fugees, released worldwide on February 13, 1996, by Columbia Records. The album features a wide range of samples and instrumentation, with many aspects of alternative hip-hop that would come to dominate the hip-hop music scene in the mid- to late-1990s. Primarily, The Score's production was handled by the Fugees themselves, Jerry Duplessis and Warren Riker, with additional production from Salaam Remi, John Forté, Diamond D, and Shawn King. The album's guest verses are from Outsidaz members Rah Digga, Young Zee, and Pacewon, as well as John Forté, and Diamond D. Most versions of the album feature four bonus tracks, including three remixes of "Fu-Gee-La", and a short acoustic Wyclef Jean solo track entitled "Mista Mista".

Upon its release, The Score was a commercial success, peaking atop the U.S. Billboard 200. It also topped the Top R&B/Hip Hop Albums chart for eight weeks, becoming the longest running number one for a hip-hop group, and topped the 1996 year-end chart. The singles "Killing Me Softly", "Fu-Gee-La", and "Ready or Not" also achieved notable chart success, leading the album to become the third best selling album of 1996 in the United States, and helping the group achieve worldwide recognition.

The album received critical acclaim. It received a nomination for Album of the Year at the 39th Grammy Awards, becoming the second rap album after MC Hammer's Please Hammer Don't Hurt 'Em to receive a nomination in the category, and the first from a hip-hop group; and won the Grammy Award for Best Rap Album, along with Best R&B Performance by a Duo or Group with Vocal for "Killing Me Softly". In retrospect, The Score has garnered a considerable amount of acclaim over the years, with many music critics and publications noting it as one of the greatest albums of the 1990s, as well as one of the greatest hip-hop albums of all time. The Score was included on the list of 200 Definitive Albums in the Rock and Roll Hall of Fame, and was ranked number 134 on Rolling Stone's revised list of "The 500 Greatest Albums of All Time" (2020).

As of February 2021, The Score has been certified seven times platinum by the Recording Industry Association of America (RIAA). It is the best-selling album by an American hip-hop act in France, where the album has been certified Diamond. With an estimated 22 million copies sold worldwide, the album has become one of the best-selling albums of all time, at the time of its release it briefly became the best-selling hip-hop album of all time, and remains the best-selling album by a hip-hop group. As of June 2021, the album is the fifth-most streamed 1990s hip-hop album on Spotify.

== Background ==
Although the Fugees' previous album, Blunted on Reality proved to be critically and commercially unsuccessful, Chris Schwartz, the head of Ruffhouse Records, decided to give the group another chance. In early 1995, he gave them a $135,000 advance and granted them complete artistic control for a follow-up album. The group used the money for recording equipment and set up a studio in Wyclef Jean's uncle's basement, which they referred to as the Booga Basement.

Recording for the album began in June 1995, and extended into November 1995 at what Jean described as a "relaxed pace ... It was done calmly, almost unconsciously. There wasn't any pressure—it was like 'let's make some music', and it just started forming into something amazing. It sounded like a feel-good hip-hop record to us, and it was different than what anyone was doing at the time. It was three kids from an urban background expressing themselves."

In regard to The Score's unified themes and production, Lauryn Hill commented: "It's an audio film. It's like how radio was back in the 1940s. It tells a story, and there are cuts and breaks in the music. It's almost like a hip-hop version of Tommy, like what The Who did for rock music."

== Music ==
The Score was produced by a variety of producers including each member of the Fugees, as well as Diamond D, Salaam Remi, and Jerry Duplessis. Although most tracks are built on sampled melodies, live instrumentation and DJing are incorporated into multiple tracks. Wyclef Jean plays the guitar on "Family Business", while DJ Skribble scratches on "Manifest/Outro". Nevertheless, samples are the predominant production tool on The Score. "Fu-Gee-La" incorporates a sample of Teena Marie's "Ooo La La La", and is interpolated in the song's chorus. "Ready or Not" also contains a sample that is interpolated; "Ready or Not (Here I Come)" by the Delfonics. "Manifest/Outro" contains a sample from "Rock Dis Funky Joint" by Poor Righteous Teachers, while the title track, "The Score" contains vocal samples from every track on the entire album.

Three official singles were released in promotion of The Score, the first of which was "Fu-Gee-La", which was released to radio in December 1995, reached the Top 40, peaking at No. 29 on the Billboard Hot 100. Additionally, the song reached No. 13 on the Hot R&B/Hip-Hop Songs, and No. 2 on the Hot Rap Songs chart. "Fu-Gee-La" was produced by Salaam Remi and includes elements of "Ooo La La La" as performed by Teena Marie.

The second single, "Killing Me Softly", with lead vocals by Lauryn Hill, was released on May 27, 1996. "Killing Me Softly" proved to be the most successful single from the album. The song went No. 1 in 20 countries, including the United Kingdom, where it peaked atop the UK Singles Chart, and became one of the region's best-selling singles ever. In the US, the song was not available for purchase, which made it ineligible to chart on the Billboard Hot 100 chart due to their previous rules; however, it still managed to peak at No. 1 on the US Mainstream Top 40 and Rhythmic airplay charts. Initially, the song was to be titled "Killing Them Softly", and though alluding to Charles Fox and Norman Gimbel's "Killing Me Softly with His Song", it was originally not intended to be a cover; however, the original writers refused permission for the rewrite of their song, but did allow the Fugees to do a cover version. In 1997, "Killing Me Softly" won the Fugees a Grammy Award for Best R&B Performance by Duo or group.

The third single released from the album was "Ready or Not", which was released on September 1, 1996. In the US the song peaked at No. 34 on the Rhythmic Top 40 chart. The song became their second No. 1 on the UK Singles Chart, staying at the top for two weeks. The track interpolates "Ready or Not, Here I Come (Can't Hide from Love)" as performed by the Delfonics, and also samples Enya's "Boadicea". Initially, this sample was uncredited, and Enya was prepared to sue for copyright infringement, but decided not to when she discovered that the Fugees were not gangsta rappers.

The accompanying music video was directed by film director Marcus Nispel, and was reported to have cost approximately 1.3 million dollars at the time, making it one of the most expensive music videos ever. In a later interview, Fugees member Pras described the recording of "Ready or Not", stating, "The three of us was each going through some pain. Lauryn was crying when she did her vocals. It was unbelievable. To see her singing with tears coming out of her eyes, it made me want to cry too."

The fourth and final single from the album, a cover of Bob Marley's "No Woman, No Cry", with lead vocals by Wyclef Jean, was released on November 18, 1996. It was produced by Wyclef Jean and Lauryn Hill, with additional production from Pras and Jerry 'Wonder' Duplessis. It features uncredited backing vocals from by Marley's children Stephen and Sharon Marley, as well as reggae singer Pam Hall. An official remix of the track, featuring Stephen Marley, was included on the group's third release, Bootleg Versions. The song peaked at No. 38 on the US Hot 100 Airplay chart. It was more successful worldwide, peaking atop the New Zealand Singles Chart for two weeks, and No. 2 in the UK.

== Critical reception ==
Professional ratings
Review scores
Source	Rating
AllMusic	5/5 stars
Chicago Tribune	3.5/4 stars
Christgau's Consumer Guide	A
Entertainment Weekly	A
Los Angeles Times	3.5/4 stars
Pitchfork	9.3/10
Q	4/5 stars
Rolling Stone	3/5 stars
The Rolling Stone Album Guide	4.5/5 stars
Spin	9/10

Upon its release, The Score received critical acclaim. Entertainment Weekly writer James Bernard commented, "What a shock: a smooth, well-produced rap album that doesn't have Dr. Dre's fingerprints on it [...] The Score showcases their acrobatic lyrical techniques and restless intelligence, and unlike much East Coast rap, The Score feels warm and intimate — partly because the instruments are live but also because the Fugees sound so relaxed and casual." Robert Christgau from The Village Voice called The Score "so beautiful and funny its courage could make you weep", and said the Fugees possess "black humanism" and "the gender-equality formula in which one girl learning equals two guys calling the shots". Steve Huey from AllMusic wrote that, "Even when they're not relying on easily recognizable tunes, their original material is powered by a raft of indelible hooks [...] The Score balances intelligence and accessibility with an easy assurance, and ranks as one of the most distinctive hip-hop albums of its era." Cheo Hodari Coker from the Los Angeles Times wrote that, "The Score succeeds on all counts", while the Fugees are as fluid a rap group since A Tribe Called Quest: "Their specialty is matching a gymnastic rhyme flow and rock-solid beats with expert crooning." Selwyn Seyfu Hinds of Spin commented, "A sense of organic interaction is the hallmark of this album [....] the album's most important factor is its beats; chest-shaking, obscure-texture-having, freestyle-friendly beats." Q described the album as "An impressively panoramic soundscape."

However, in a mixed review, Rolling Stone writer Ann Powers commented, "The Fugees' roots in reggae gives them a solid base in song and a basic philosophy that's richer than the money-or-nothing ethic that dulls much of rap these days. Without being sanctimonious, The Score paints the ghetto as a mythical landscape, one that can inspire pride as well as sorrow. Like Wu-Tang Clan, the Fugees view the world as their movie, complete with stunts and special effects." Jon Pareles of The New York Times found the group's "vision of ghetto life" both eccentric and realistic, although he felt "Killing Me Softly" sounds "out of place amid the hard-nosed surrealism".

=== Awards ===
Awards and nominations for The Score
Year	Organization	Award	Result
1997	Soul Train Music Awards	Album of the Year	Nominated
1997	Grammy Awards	Album of the Year	Nominated
1997	Grammy Awards	Best Rap Album	Won

=== Accolades ===
- (*) Signifies unordered lists

Accolades for The Score
Publication	Country	Accolade	Year	Rank
About.com	United States	100 Greatest Rap Albums	2008	18
About.com	United States	Best Rap Albums of 1996	2008	5
Alternative Press	United States	20 Albums That Paved The Way For Alternative As We Know It	2022	*
BigO	Singapore	Albums of the Year	1996	34
Blender	United States	500 CDs You Must Own Before You Die	2003	*
Ego Trip	United States	Hip Hop's 25 Greatest Albums by Year 1980–98	1999	5
Elvis Costello	United Kingdom	500 Albums You Need	2013	*
Expressen	Sweden	The 100 Best Records Ever	1999	100
Eye Weekly	Canada	Albums of the Year	1996	15
Face	United Kingdom	Albums of the Year	1996	1
Helsingin Sanomat	Finland	50th Anniversary of Rock	2004	*
Hip Hop Connection	United Kingdom	The 100 Greatest Rap Albums 1995–2005	2005	15
Juice	Australia	The 100 (+34) Greatest Albums of the 90s	1999	64
Mixmag	United Kingdom	Albums of the Year	1996	2
Mojo	United Kingdom	Albums of the Year	1996	15
Mojo	United Kingdom	The Mojo Collection (4th Edition)	03/07	*
Muzik	United Kingdom	Albums of the Year	1996	3
The New Nation	United Kingdom	Top 100 Albums by Black Artists	2005	34
NME	United States	1996 Crits Poll	1996	22
NME	United Kingdom	Best Albums and Tracks of 1996	2016	22
Nude as the News	United States	The 100 Most Compelling Albums of the 90s	1999	97
OOR	Netherlands	Albums of the Year	1996	38
Pause & Play	United States	The 90s Top 100 Essential Albums	1999	11
Plásticos y Decibelios	Spain	The 80 Best Albums of All Time	2000	68
Pop	Sweden	Albums of the Year	1996	1
Pure Pop	Mexico	Albums of the Year	1996	10
Q	United Kingdom	Albums of the Year	1996	*
Q	United Kingdom	90 best Albums of the 90s	1999	*
Record Collector	United Kingdom	10 Classic Albums from 21 Genres for the 21st Century	2000	*
Robert Dimery	United States	1001 Albums You Must Hear Before You Die	2005	*
Rock Sound	France	Albums of the Year	1996	24
Rolling Stone	United States	Albums of the Year	1996	10
Rolling Stone	United States	The Essential Recordings of the 90s	1999	*
Rolling Stone	United States	100 Best Albums of the Nineties	2011	44
Rolling Stone	United States	The 500 Greatest Albums of All Time	2003	477
Rolling Stone	United States	The 500 Greatest Albums of All Time	2012	469
Rolling Stone	United States	The 500 Greatest Albums of All Time	2020	134
The Source	United States	100 Best Rap Albums	1998	*
The Source	United States	The Critics Top 100 Black Music Albums of All Time	2006	34
Spex	Germany	Albums of the Year	1996	41
Spin	United States	20 Best Albums of '96	2	
Spin	United States	The 90 Greatest Albums of the '90s	1999	17
Tom Moon	United States	1,000 Recordings to Hear Before You Die	2008	*
Various Writers	United States	Albums: 50 Years of Great Recordings	2005	*
Vibe	United States	100 Essential Albums of the 20th Century	1999	*
The Village Voice	United States	Albums of the Year	1996	2
Vox	United Kingdom	Albums of the Year	1996	15
VPRO	Netherlands	299 Nominations of the Best Album of All Time	2006	*
Yardbarker	United States	The 25 most important hip hop albums from the '90s	2022	*
Yediot Ahonot	Israel	Top 99 Albums of All Time	1999	74

== Track listing ==
The Score track listing
No.	Title	Writer(s)	Producer(s)	Length
1.	"Red Intro"		Wyclef; Te Bass; Pras^{[a]}	1:51
2.	"How Many Mics"	Lauryn Hill; Nelust Jean; Prakazrel Michel	Wyclef Jean; Shawn King; Hill; Pras^{[a]}; Jerry "Te Bass" Duplessis^{[a]}	4:28
3.	"Ready or Not"	Hill; Jean; Michel; William Hart; Eithne Bhraonáin; Thomas Bell; Nicholas Ryan; Roma Ryan	Wyclef; Hill; Pras^{[a]}; Te Bass^{[a]}	3:47
4.	"Zealots"	Hill; Jean; Michel	Wyclef; Hill; Pras^{[a]}; Te Bass^{[a]}	4:20
5.	"The Beast"	Hill; Jean; Michel	Wyclef; Hill; Pras^{[a]}; Te Bass^{[a]}	5:37
6.	"Fu-Gee-La"	Hill; Jean; Michel; Salaam Gibbs; Mary Brockert; Allen McGrier	Salaam Remi	4:20
7.	"Family Business" (featuring John Forté and Omega)	Hill; Jean; Michel; John Forté; Omega	Wyclef; Hill; Forté; Pras^{[a]}; Te Bass^{[a]}	5:43
8.	"Killing Me Softly"	Charles Fox; Norman Gimbel	Wyclef; Hill; Pras^{[a]}; Te Bass^{[a]}	4:58
9.	"The Score" (featuring Diamond D)	Hill; Jean; Michel; Joseph Kirkland	Diamond D; Wyclef^{[a]}; Hill^{[a]}; Pras^{[a]}; Te Bass^{[a]}	5:02
10.	"The Mask"	Hill; Jean; Michel	Wyclef; Hill; Pras^{[a]}; Te Bass^{[a]}	4:50
11.	"Cowboys" (featuring the Outsidaz)	Hill; Jean; Michel; Dewayne Battle; Rashia Fisher; Jerome Hinds; Forté	Wyclef; Hill; Forté; Pras^{[a]}; Te Bass^{[a]}	5:23
12.	"No Woman, No Cry"	Vincent Ford	Wyclef; Hill; Pras^{[a]}; Te Bass^{[a]}	4:33
13.	"Manifest"/"Outro"	Hill; Jean; Michel	Wyclef; Hill; Pras^{[a]}; Te Bass^{[a]}	5:59
Total length:				60:52

Bonus tracks (CD only)
No.	Title	Writer(s)	Producer(s)	Length
14.	"Fu-Gee-La" (Refugee Camp Remix featuring John Forté)	Hill; Jean; Michel; McGrier; Marie	Wyclef; Hill; Pras^{[a]}; Te Bass^{[a]}	4:22
15.	"Fu-Gee-La" (Sly & Robbie mix)	Hill; Jean; Michel; McGrier; Marie	Handel Tucker	5:27
16.	"Mista Mista"	Jean	Wyclef; Te Bass; Hill^{[a]}	2:42
17.	"Fu-Gee-La" (Refugee Camp global mix featuring John Forté)	Hill; Jean; Michel; McGrier; Marie	Wyclef; Hill; Pras^{[a]}; Te Bass^{[a]}	4:20
Total length:				77:52

Notes

- ^{^[a]} signifies a co-producer.
- Interludes performed by Talent, Wil Shannon Briggs and Ras Baraka.
- Intro performed by Red Alert and Ras Baraka.
- Outro performed by Red Alert.
- "Fu-Gee-La (Sly & Robbie mix)" features uncredited vocals by Akon.

Sample credits

- "Ready or Not" contains samples of "Boadicea" by Enya, "God Made Me Funky" by The Headhunters, and an interpolation of "Ready or Not, Here I Come (Can't Hide from Love)" by The Delfonics.
- "Zealots" contains a sample of "I Only Have Eyes for You" by The Flamingos.
- "The Beast" contains a sample of "God Made Me Funky" by The Headhunters.
- "Fu-Gee-La" contains a sample of "(If Loving You Is Wrong) I Don't Want to Be Right" by Ramsey Lewis, and an interpolation of "Ooo La La La" by Teena Marie.
- "Family Business" contains a sample of "Recuerdos de la Alhambra" by Francisco Tarrega, and "Gypsy Woman" by Joe Bataan (on the outro interlude).
- "Killing Me Softly" covers "Killing Me Softly with His Song" by Roberta Flack, and contains samples of "Bonita Applebum" by A Tribe Called Quest, "Memory Band" by Rotary Connection, "Fool Yourself" by Little Feat, and "The Day Begins" by The Moody Blues (on the outro interlude).
- "The Score" contains samples of "Dove" by Cymande, "My Melody" by Eric B. & Rakim, "Planet Rock" by Afrika Bambaataa, and "Scorpio" by Dennis Coffey and the Detroit Guitar Band (on the outro interlude).
- "Cowboys" contains a sample of "Something 'Bout Love" by The Main Ingredient.
- "No Woman, No Cry" covers "No Woman, No Cry" by Bob Marley & The Wailers.
- "Manifest" contains a sample of "Rock Dis Funky Joint" by Poor Righteous Teachers.

== Personnel ==
Fugees

- Wyclef Jean – vocals, guitar, producer
- Lauryn Hill – vocals, producer, arranger
- Pras Michel – vocals, producer

Additional personnel

- John Forté – vocals, producer, drum programming
- Diamond D – vocals, producer
- DJ Red Alert – vocals
- Omega – vocals
- Pacewon – vocals
- Rah Digga – vocals
- Young Zee – vocals
- Akon - vocals
- Sly Dunbar – drums, drum programming
- Ras Baraka – vocals
- Robbie Shakespeare – bass
- Backspin – DJ scratches
- DJ Scribble – DJ scratches
- Jerry Duplessis – producer
- Salaam Remi – producer
- Shawn King – producer
- Handel Tucker – producer, keyboards
- Warren Riker – recorder, engineer
- Bob Brockmann – engineer
- Gary Noble – engineer
- Eddie Hudson – engineer, mixing
- Delroy Pottinger – engineer
- Courtney Small – engineer

== Charts ==
=== Weekly charts ===
Weekly chart performance for The Score
Chart (1996)	Peak position
Australian Albums (ARIA)	5
Austrian Albums (Ö3 Austria)	1
Belgian Albums (Ultratop Flanders)	1
Belgian Albums (Ultratop Wallonia)	1
Canada Top Albums/CDs (RPM)	1
Danish Albums (Hitlisten)	3
Dutch Albums (Album Top 100)	1
European Albums (Music & Media)	1
Finnish Albums (Suomen virallinen lista)	3
French Albums (SNEP)	1
German Albums (Offizielle Top 100)	1
Hungarian Albums (MAHASZ)	1
Icelandic Albums (Tónlist)	1
Irish Albums (IRMA)	2
Italian Albums (FIMI)	2
New Zealand Albums (RMNZ)	4
Norwegian Albums (VG-lista)	1
Portuguese Albums (AFP)	8
Spanish Albums (AFYVE)	14
Scottish Albums (Official Charts)	5
Swedish Albums (Sverigetopplistan)	2
Swiss Albums (Schweizer Hitparade)	1
UK Albums (Official Charts)	2
UK R&B Albums (Official Charts)	1
US Billboard 200	1
US Top R&B/Hip-Hop Albums (Billboard)	1

=== Year-end charts ===
1996 year-end chart performance for The Score
Chart (1996)	Position
Australian Albums (ARIA)	38
Austrian Albums (Ö3 Austria)	5
Canada Top Albums/CDs (RPM)	3
Dutch Albums (Album Top 100)	9
European Albums (Top 100)	4
French Albums (SNEP)	1
German Albums (Offizielle Top 100)	1
Italian Albums (Hit Parade)	6
New Zealand Albums (RMNZ)	10
Norwegian Albums (VG-lista)	7
Spanish Albums (AFYVE)	31
Swedish Albums (Sverigetopplistan)	11
Swiss Albums (Schweizer Hitparade)	6
UK Albums (OCC)	7
US Billboard 200	5
US Top R&B/Hip-Hop Albums (Billboard)	1

1997 year-end chart performance for The Score
Chart (1997)	Position
UK Albums (OCC)	53

2002 year-end chart performance for The Score
Chart (2002)	Position
Canadian R&B Albums (Nielsen SoundScan)	186
Canadian Rap Albums (Nielsen SoundScan)	92

=== Decade-end charts ===
Decade-end chart performance for The Score
Chart (1990–1999)	Position
US Billboard 200	58

== Certifications ==
Certifications and sales for The Score
Region	Certification	Certified units/sales
Australia (ARIA)	Platinum	70,000^{^}
Austria (IFPI Austria)	Platinum	50,000^{*}
Belgium (BRMA)	Platinum	50,000^{*}
Canada (Music Canada)	5× Platinum	500,000^{^}
Denmark (IFPI Danmark)	4× Platinum	80,000^{‡}
Finland	—	26,267
France (SNEP)	Diamond	1,000,000^{*}
Germany (BVMI)	3× Gold	750,000^{^}
Iceland	—	6,000
Italy (FIMI) sales since 2009	Gold	25,000^{‡}
Japan (RIAJ)	Gold	100,000^{^}
Netherlands (NVPI)	Platinum	100,000^{^}
New Zealand (RMNZ)	Platinum	15,000^{^}
Norway (IFPI Norway)	Gold	25,000^{*}
Poland (ZPAV)	Platinum	100,000^{*}
Spain (Promusicae)	Platinum	100,000^{^}
Sweden (GLF)	Platinum	100,000^{^}
Switzerland (IFPI Switzerland)	2× Platinum	100,000^{^}
United Kingdom (BPI)	5× Platinum	1,500,000^{^}
United States (RIAA)	7× Platinum	7,000,000^{‡}
Summaries
Europe (IFPI)	6× Platinum	6,000,000^{*}
Worldwide	—	22,000,000
^{*} Sales figures based on certification alone.^{^} Shipments figures based on certification alone.^{‡} Sales+streaming figures based on certification alone.

== See also ==
- Album era
- List of Billboard 200 number-one albums of 1996
- List of Billboard number-one R&B albums of 1996
- Billboard Year-End
