= List of 200 Definitive Albums in the Rock and Roll Hall of Fame =

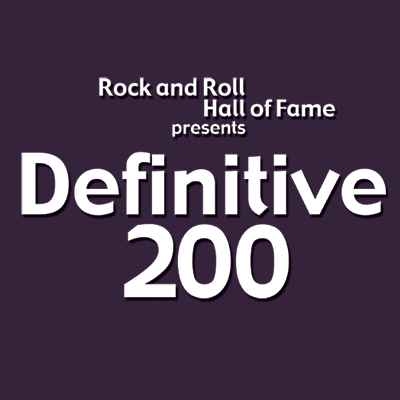
Definitive 200 Albums of Rock Hall of Fame project logo

The 200 definitive albums in the Rock and Roll Hall of Fame is a 2007 list of the best albums ever produced by artists or bands throughout the history of world music according to the criteria of Rock and Roll Hall of Fame and the National Association of Recording Merchandisers (NARM). Good sales performance and continuity of potential with lasting popularity are adopted as criteria by both.

== Table of 200 definitive albums ==
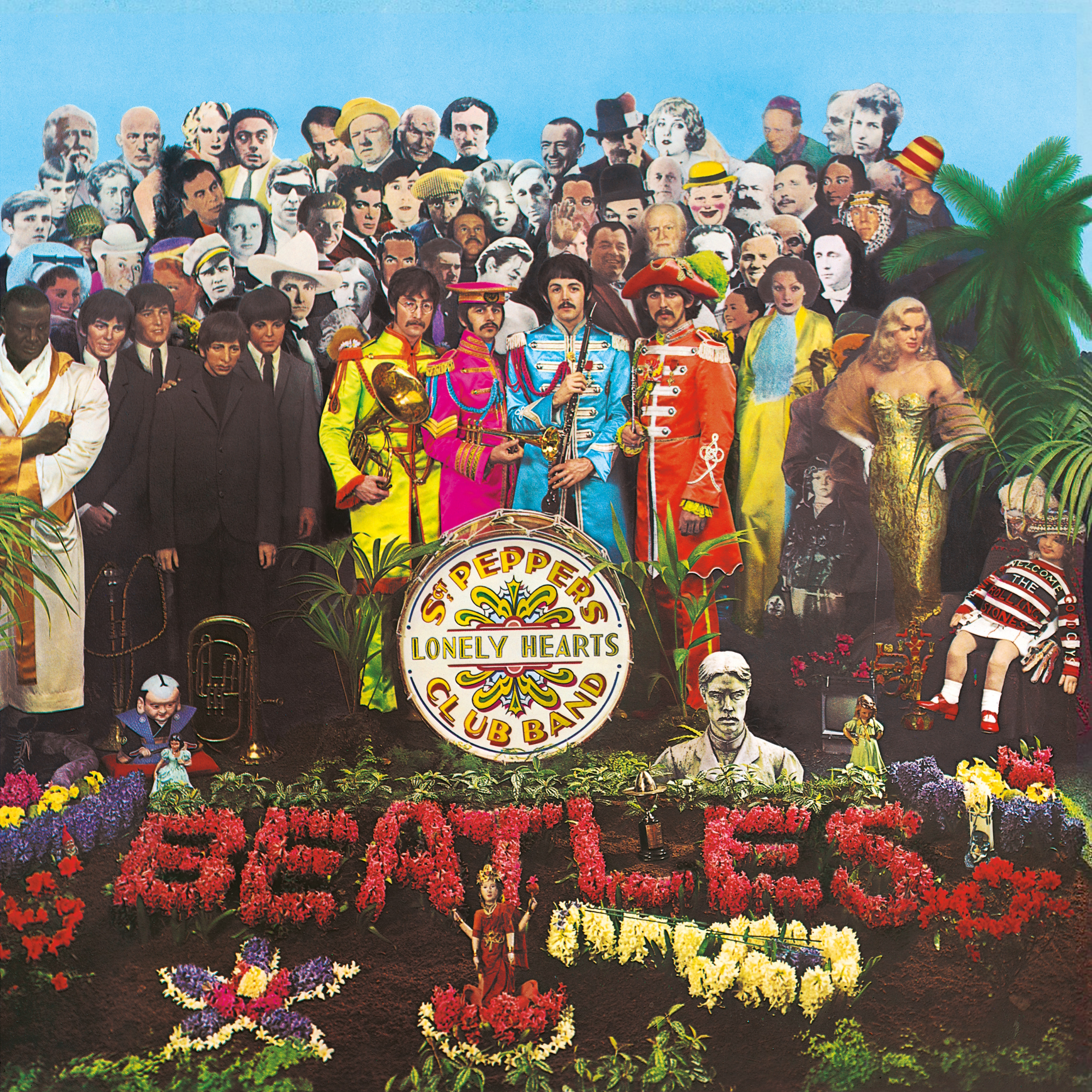
Sgt. Pepper's Lonely Hearts Club Band by the Beatles is #1 on the 200 list, in addition to the band being the most featured in the rankings.

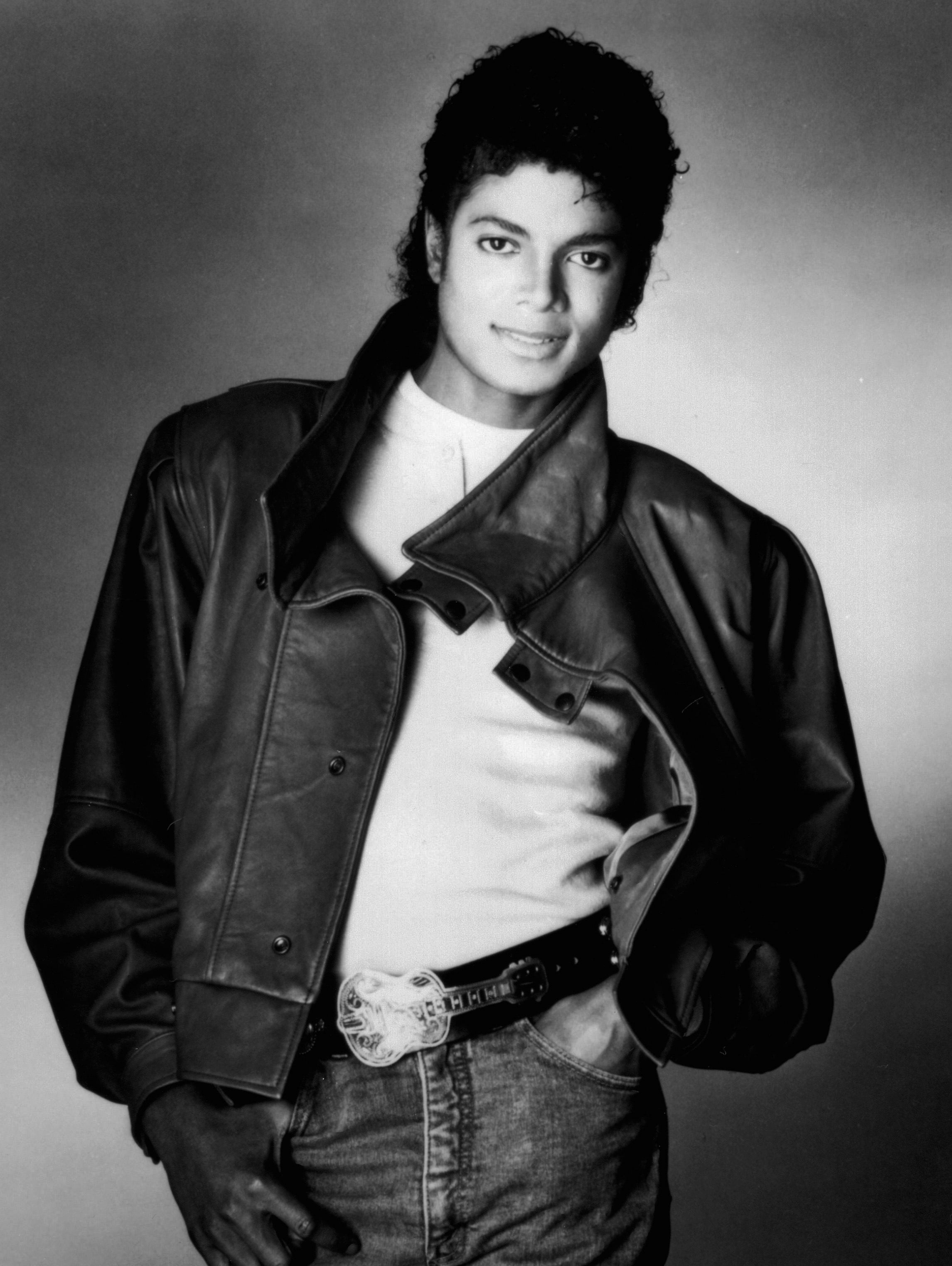
Michael Jackson is number 3 with the album Thriller

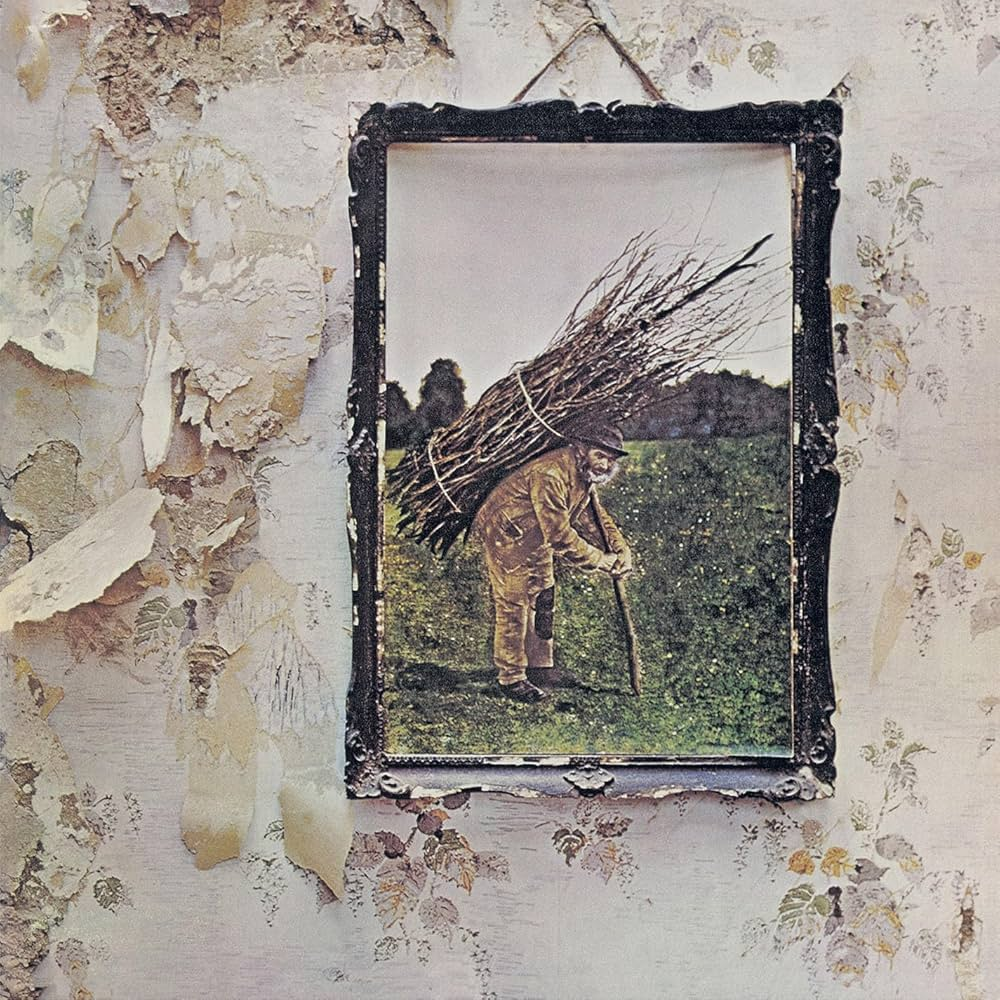
Led Zeppelin is number 4 with the album Led Zeppelin IV

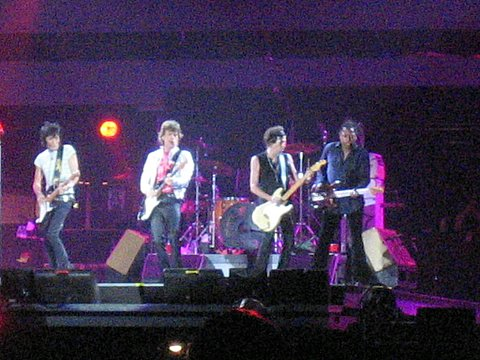
The Rolling Stones is 6th with Exile on Main St.

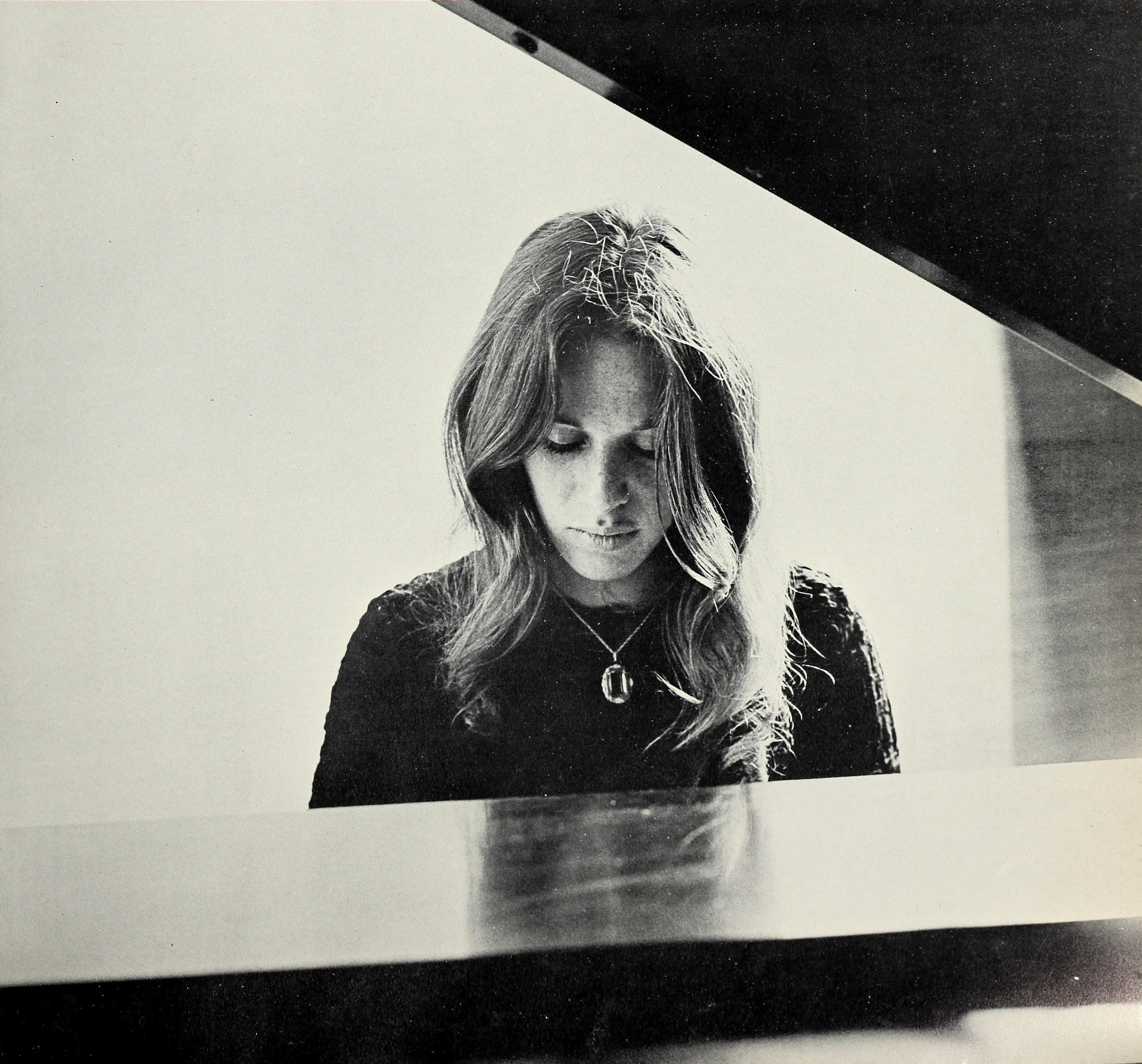
Carole King is the highest ranked woman on the list, at #7 with Tapestry

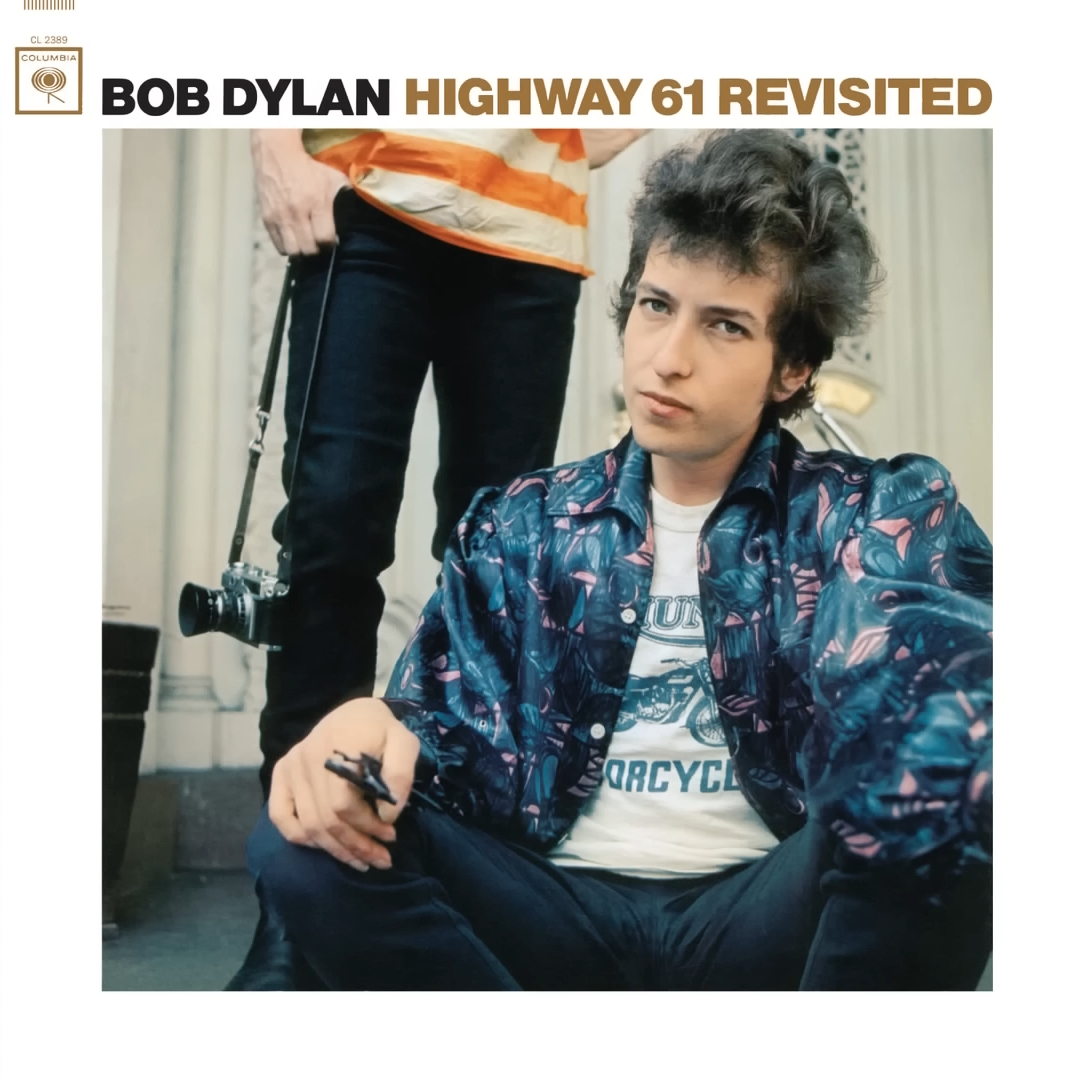
Bob Dylan is in 8th place with Highway 61 Revisited

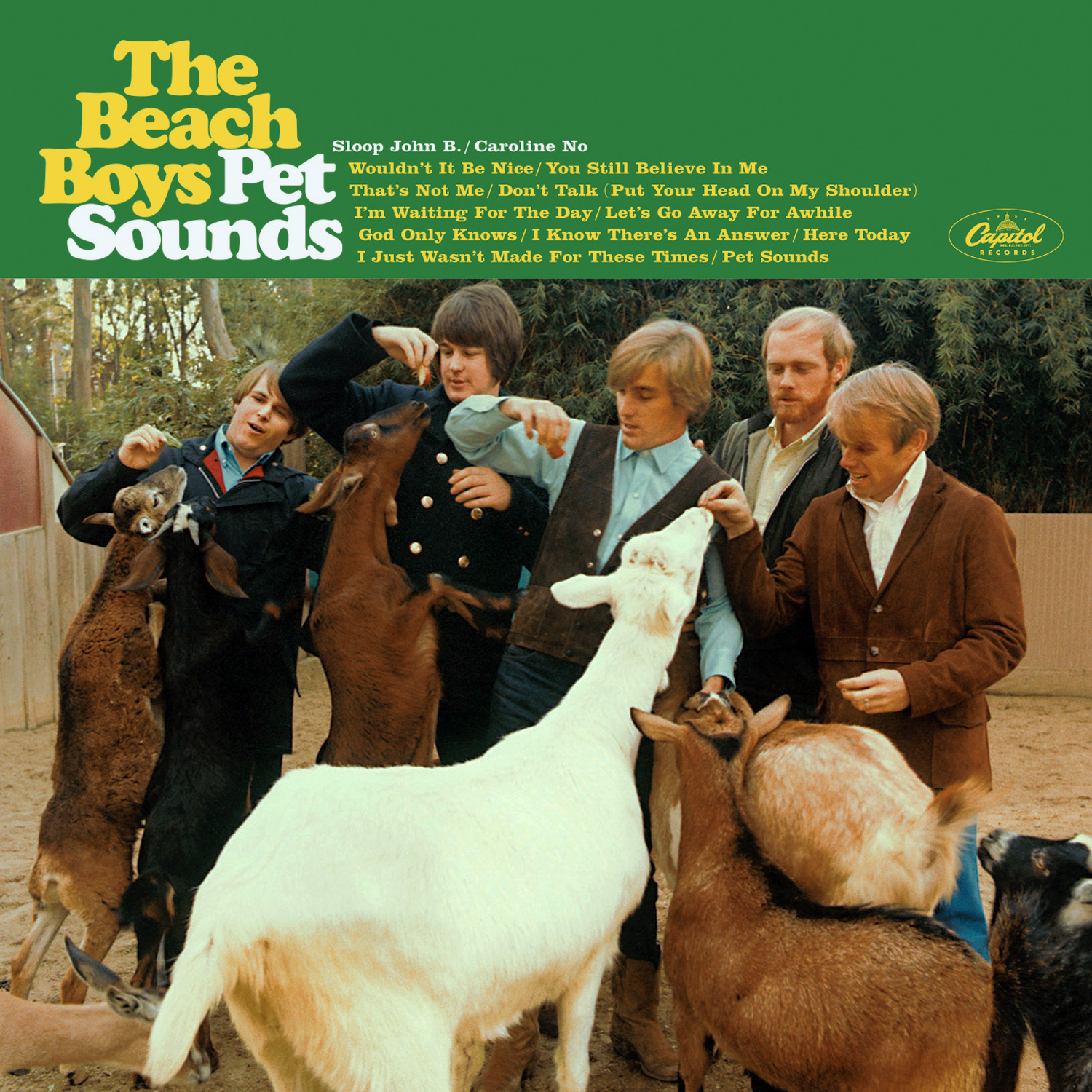
The Beach Boys in 9th place with Pet Sounds

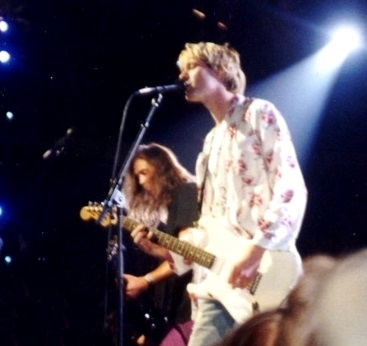
Nirvana is in 10th place with Nevermind; Pearl Jam is at 11th with Ten

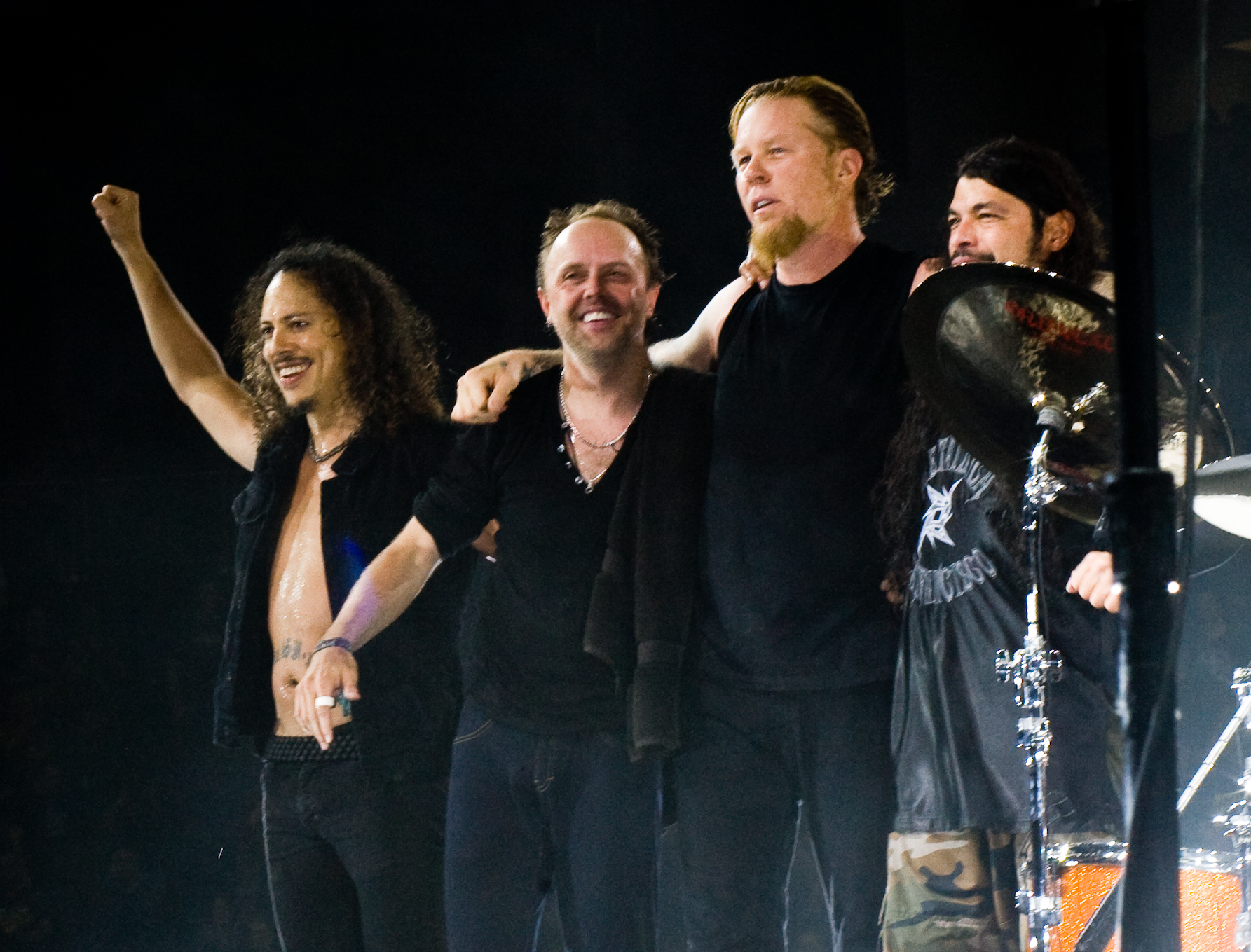
Metallica appears at 14th with their self-titled album. They are the only metal band to have four albums on the list, ranking second overall.

Position	Album	Artist	Release date
1	Sgt. Pepper's Lonely Hearts Club Band	The Beatles	May 26, 1967
2	The Dark Side of the Moon	Pink Floyd	March 1, 1973
3	Thriller	Michael Jackson	November 30, 1982
4	Led Zeppelin IV	Led Zeppelin	November 8, 1971
5	The Joshua Tree	U2	March 9, 1987
6	Exile on Main St.	The Rolling Stones	May 12, 1972
7	Tapestry	Carole King	February 10, 1971
8	Highway 61 Revisited	Bob Dylan	August 30, 1965
9	Pet Sounds	Beach Boys	May 16, 1966
10	Nevermind	Nirvana	September 24, 1991
11	Ten	Pearl Jam	August 27, 1991
12	Abbey Road	The Beatles	September 26, 1969
13	Supernatural	Santana	June 15, 1999
14	Metallica	Metallica	August 12, 1991
15	Born to Run	Bruce Springsteen	August 25, 1975
16	Purple Rain	Prince	June 25, 1984
17	Back in Black	AC/DC	July 25, 1980
18	Let It Bleed	The Rolling Stones	November 28, 1969
19	The Doors	The Doors	January 4, 1967
20	American Beauty	Grateful Dead	November 1, 1970
21	Come on Over	Shania Twain	November 4, 1997
22	Who's Next	The Who	August 2, 1971
23	Songs in the Key of Life	Stevie Wonder	September 28, 1976
24	Rumours	Fleetwood Mac	February 4, 1977
25	The Wall	Pink Floyd	November 30, 1979
26	Jagged Little Pill	Alanis Morissette	June 13, 1995
27	Come Away with Me	Norah Jones	February 26, 2002
28	The Marshall Mathers LP	Eminem	March 23, 2000
29	Speakerboxxx/The Love Below	OutKast	September 23, 2003
30	The Chronic	Dr. Dre	December 15, 1992
31	Licensed to Ill	Beastie Boys	November 15, 1986
32	Appetite for Destruction	Guns N' Roses	July 21, 1987
33	Wide Open Spaces	Dixie Chicks	January 27, 1998
34	Kind of Blue	Miles Davis	August 17, 1959
35	Hotel California	Eagles	December 8, 1976
36	Hysteria	Def Leppard	August 3, 1987
37	Grease	Various artists	April 14, 1978
38	What's Going On	Marvin Gaye	May 21, 1971
39	The Beatles	The Beatles	November 22, 1968
40	Saturday Night Fever: The Original Movie Sound Track	Various artists	November 15, 1977
41	Are You Experienced	Jimi Hendrix	May 12, 1967
42	Revolver	The Beatles	August 5, 1966
43	Boston	Boston	August 25, 1976
44	Slippery When Wet	Bon Jovi	August 18, 1986
45	Achtung Baby	U2	November 19, 1991
46	Whitney Houston	Whitney Houston	February 14, 1985
47	Led Zeppelin II	Led Zeppelin	October 22, 1969
48	Crash	Dave Matthews Band	April 30, 1996
49	Sticky Fingers	The Rolling Stones	April 23, 1971
50	Dookie	Green Day	February 1, 1994
51	Houses of the Holy	Led Zeppelin	March 28, 1973
52	Blue	Joni Mitchell	June 22, 1971
53	Elvis at Sun	Elvis Presley	June 22, 2004
54	Toys in the Attic	Aerosmith	April 8, 1975
55	The Miseducation of Lauryn Hill	Lauryn Hill	August 25, 1998
56	Born in the U.S.A.	Bruce Springsteen	June 4, 1984
57	Get Rich or Die Tryin'	50 Cent	February 4, 2003
58	Highway to Hell	AC/DC	July 27, 1979
59	Life After Death	The Notorious B.I.G.	March 25, 1997
60	Van Halen	Van Halen	February 10, 1978
61	American Idiot	Green Day	September 21, 2004
62	Paranoid	Black Sabbath	September 18, 1970
63	The Eminem Show	Eminem	May 26, 2002
64	Pieces of You	Jewel	February 28, 1995
65	A Rush of Blood to the Head	Coldplay	August 26, 2002
66	Bat Out of Hell	Meat Loaf	October 21, 1977
67	Confessions	Usher	March 23, 2004
68	Devil Without a Cause	Kid Rock	August 18, 1998
69	All Things Must Pass	George Harrison	November 27, 1970
70	The Stranger	Billy Joel	September 29, 1977
71	Hell Freezes Over	Eagles	November 8, 1994
72	Moondance	Van Morrison	February 27, 1970
73	Automatic for the People	R.E.M.	October 5, 1992
74	No Jacket Required	Phil Collins	January 25, 1985
75	Master of Puppets	Metallica	March 3, 1986
76	Breathe	Faith Hill	November 9, 1999
77	At Folsom Prison	Johnny Cash	October 19, 1999
78	A Love Supreme	John Coltrane	January 1965
79	Wish You Were Here	Pink Floyd	September 15, 1975
80	Off the Wall	Michael Jackson	August 10, 1979
81	Let's Get It On	Marvin Gaye	August 28, 1973
82	Night Moves	Bob Seger and the Silver Bullet Band	October 22, 1976
83	Graceland	Paul Simon	August 12, 1986
84	Hybrid Theory	Linkin Park	October 24, 2000
85	1999	Prince	October 27, 1982
86	Pyromania	Def Leppard	January 20, 1983
87	Control	Janet Jackson	February 6, 1986
88	Blood Sugar Sex Magik	Red Hot Chili Peppers	September 23, 1991
89	Brothers in Arms	Dire Straits	May 1, 1985
90	All Eyez on Me	2Pac	February 13, 1996
91	Yourself or Someone Like You	Matchbox Twenty	October 1, 1996
92	Californication	Red Hot Chili Peppers	June 8, 1999
93	Physical Graffiti	Led Zeppelin	February 24, 1975
94	Country Grammar	Nelly	June 27, 2000
95	Human Clay	Creed	September 28, 1999
96	London Calling	The Clash	December 14, 1979
97	Falling into You	Celine Dion	March 12, 1996
98	Harvest	Neil Young	February 1, 1972
99	Dirty Dancing	Various artists	August 21, 1987
100	Home	Dixie Chicks	August 27, 2002
101	Full Moon Fever	Tom Petty	April 24, 1989
102	1984	Van Halen	January 9, 1984
103	Titanic	Various artists	December 18, 1997
104	Déjà Vu	Crosby, Stills, Nash & Young	March 11, 1970
105	CrazySexyCool	TLC	November 15, 1994
106	Odelay	Beck Hansen	June 18, 1996
107	Breathless	Kenny G	October 20, 1992
108	Straight Outta Compton	N.W.A	August 8, 1988
109	Never Mind the Bollocks, Here's the Sex Pistols	Sex Pistols	October 28, 1977
110	Rubber Soul	The Beatles	December 3, 1965
111	OK Computer	Radiohead	June 16, 1997
112	Bridge over Troubled Water	Simon and Garfunkel	January 26, 1970
113	Fly	Dixie Chicks	August 31, 1999
114	...And Justice for All	Metallica	September 6, 1988
115	Dangerous	Michael Jackson	November 26, 1991
116	Daydream	Mariah Carey	October 3, 1995
117	Top Gun	Various artists	May 13, 1986
118	Goodbye Yellow Brick Road	Elton John	October 5, 1973
119	Synchronicity	The Police	June 1, 1983
120	Tragic Kingdom	No Doubt	October 10, 1995
121	Beggars Banquet	The Rolling Stones	December 6, 1968
122	R.	R. Kelly	September 29, 1998
123	Lateralus	Tool	May 15, 2001
124	(What's the Story) Morning Glory?	Oasis	October 2, 1995
125	Exodus	Bob Marley and the Wailers	June 3, 1977
126	Escape	Journey	July 31, 1981
127	Christina Aguilera	Christina Aguilera	August 24, 1999
128	The Blueprint	Jay-Z	September 11, 2001
129	The Diary of Alicia Keys	Alicia Keys	December 1, 2003
130	O Brother, Where Art Thou?	Various artists	December 5, 2000
131	The Cars	The Cars	June 6, 1978
132	A Day Without Rain	Enya	November 21, 2000
133	Unforgettable... with Love	Natalie Cole	June 11, 1991
134	Footloose	Various artists	January 31, 1984
135	Can't Slow Down	Lionel Richie	October 11, 1983
136	Surfacing	Sarah McLachlan	July 15, 1997
137	Nick of Time	Bonnie Raitt	March 21, 1989
138	Ride the Lightning	Metallica	July 27, 1984
139	Tuesday Night Music Club	Sheryl Crow	August 3, 1993
140	In the Wee Small Hours	Frank Sinatra	April 25, 1955
141	Gratitude	Earth, Wind & Fire	November 11, 1975
142	Eliminator	ZZ Top	March 23, 1983
143	Red Headed Stranger	Willie Nelson	May 1975
144	Imagine	John Lennon	September 9, 1971
145	Toni Braxton	Toni Braxton	July 13, 1993
146	At Last!	Etta James	November 15, 1960
147	Elvis Presley	Elvis Presley	March 23, 1956
148	Tea for the Tillerman	Cat Stevens	November 23, 1970
149	Mellon Collie and the Infinite Sadness	The Smashing Pumpkins	October 24, 1995
150	Time Out	The Dave Brubeck Quartet	December 14, 1959
151	Janet.	Janet Jackson	May 18, 1993
152	A Night at the Opera	Queen	November 21, 1975
153	Blizzard of Ozz	Ozzy Osbourne	September 20, 1980
154	Big Willie Style	Will Smith	November 25, 1997
155	Sign o' the Times	Prince	March 31, 1987
156	It Takes a Nation of Millions to Hold Us Back	Public Enemy	April 17, 1988
157	Blood on the Tracks	Bob Dylan	January 17, 1975
158	Faith	George Michael	October 30, 1987
159	Cooleyhighharmony	Boyz II Men	April 30, 1991
160	The Writing's on the Wall	Destiny's Child	July 27, 1999
161	The Black Album	Jay-Z	November 14, 2003
162	Let Go	Avril Lavigne	June 4, 2002
163	The Score	Fugees	February 13, 1996
164	Like a Virgin	Madonna	November 12, 1984
165	Led Zeppelin	Led Zeppelin	January 12, 1969
166	Texas Flood	Stevie Ray Vaughan	June 15, 1983
167	Core	Stone Temple Pilots	September 29, 1992
168	The Phantom of the Opera	Andrew Lloyd Webber	October 9, 1986
169	Aqualung	Jethro Tull	March 19, 1971
170	Me Against the World	2Pac	March 14, 1995
171	The Rise and Fall of Ziggy Stardust and the Spiders from Mars	David Bowie	June 6, 1972
172	Laundry Service	Shakira	November 13, 2001
173	Forrest Gump	Various artists	June 28, 1994
174	Call Me	Al Green	July 18, 1973
175	Super Fly	Curtis Mayfield	July 11, 1972
176	Throwing Copper	Live	April 26, 1994
177	Breezin'	George Benson	March 19, 1976
178	White Blood Cells	The White Stripes	July 3, 2001
179	Pronounced Leh-Nerd Skin-Nerd	Lynyrd Skynyrd	August 13, 1973
180	Diamond Life	Sade	July 28, 1984
181	Fleetwood Mac	Fleetwood Mac	July 11, 1975
182	Band on the Run	Wings	December 7, 1973
183	Dangerously in Love	Beyoncé	June 24, 2003
184	Rapture	Anita Baker	March 20, 1986
185	Illmatic	Nas	April 15, 1994
186	A Star Is Born	Paul Williams	November 1976
187	That's the Way of the World	Earth, Wind & Fire	March 15, 1975
188	Rhythm of Love	Anita Baker	September 13, 1994
189	In My Lifetime, Vol. 1	Jay-Z	November 4, 1997
190	Mama Said Knock You Out	LL Cool J	August 27, 1990
191	Aja	Steely Dan	September 23, 1977
192	Stardust	Willie Nelson	April 1978
193	Sparkle	Aretha Franklin	May 27, 1976
194	Andrea	Andrea Bocelli	November 9, 2004
195	Bringing It All Back Home	Bob Dylan	March 22, 1965
196	Never Too Much	Luther Vandross	August 12, 1981
197	All That You Can't Leave Behind	U2	October 30, 2000
198	2112	Rush	April 1, 1976
199	Aquemini	Outkast	September 29, 1998
200	We're an American Band	Grand Funk Railroad	July 15, 1973

=== Artists or bands that appear the most in the ranking ===
Number of albums	Artists or bands
5	The Beatles
5	Led Zeppelin
4	Metallica
4	The Rolling Stones
3	Bob Dylan
3	Dixie Chicks
3	Jay-Z
3	Michael Jackson
3	Pink Floyd
3	Prince
3	U2
2	AC/DC
2	Anita Baker
2	Bruce Springsteen
2	Def Leppard
2	Eagles
2	Earth, Wind, & Fire
2	Elvis Presley
2	Eminem
2	Fleetwood Mac
2	Green Day
2	Janet Jackson
2	Outkast
2	Red Hot Chili Peppers
2	Van Halen
2	Willie Nelson

=== Definitive albums ranked by decade ===
Decade	Number
1950s	4
1960s	17
1970s	58
1980s	40
1990s	56
2000s	25

== See also ==
- Rock and Roll Hall of Fame inductees
