= Elmopalooza! (soundtrack) =

Sesame Street children's album from 1998

Studio album and soundtrack by characters from Sesame Street
- Released: March 3, 1998
- Recorded: 1997
- Genre: Children's
- Label: Sony

original release

Elmopalooza! is a 1998 children's album featuring songs performed by characters from Sesame Street with special musical guests. First released on CD and cassette in 1998, this album is the soundtrack to the Elmopalooza television special which commemorated Sesame Street's 30th anniversary. This album won the 1999 Grammy Award for Best Musical Album for Children.

The album was re-issued in 2008 by Koch Records with the same tracks, but with new cover art and including a booklet containing the lyrics.

== Track listing ==
All of the songs from the special are included, with two songs, "Happy to Meet You" and Steven Tyler's rendition of "I Love Trash" being exclusive to the soundtrack.

1. "Mambo I, I, I" - Gloria Estefan
2. "I Want a Monster to Be My Friend" - En Vogue
3. "The Zig Zag Dance" - Mighty Mighty Bosstones and Count von Count
4. "Nearly Missed" - Rosie O'Donnell and Elmo
5. "Just Happy to Be Me" - The Fugees
6. "I Don't Want to Live on the Moon" - Shawn Colvin and Ernie
7. "I Love Trash" - Steven Tyler
8. "Caribbean Amphibian" - Jimmy Buffett, Kermit the Frog & The All-Amphibian Band
9. "Happy to Meet You" - Celine Dion, Big Bird, Elmo & Herry Monster
10. "One Small Voice" - Kenny Loggins and the Kids
11. "Songs" - Elmo and the Kids
