= No Woman, No Cry =

1974 song by Bob Marley and the Wailers

Song by Bob Marley and the Wailers

from the album Natty Dread
- Language: English; Jamaican Patois
- Released: 25 October 1974
- Recorded: 1974
- Studio: Harry J Studio (Kingston, Jamaica)
- Genre: Reggae
- Length: 3:46
- Label: Island; Tuff Gong
- Songwriters: Bob Marley; Vincent Ford
- Producers: Bob Marley and the Wailers; Chris Blackwell; Steve Smith

"No Woman, No Cry (Live '75)"

Single by Bob Marley and the Wailers

from the album Live!
- Language: English; Jamaican Patois
- B-side: "Kinky Reggae"
- Released: 29 August 1975
- Recorded: 17 July 1975
- Venue: Lyceum Theatre, London
- Genre: Reggae
- Length: 7:07
- Label: Island
- Songwriter: Bob Marley

Bob Marley and the Wailers singles chronology
"So Jah Seh" (1974)	"No Woman, No Cry (Live '75)" (1975)	"Rat Race" (1975)

"No Woman, No Cry" is a reggae song performed by Jamaican band Bob Marley and the Wailers. The song was recorded in 1974 and released on their seventh studio album, Natty Dread (1974).

The live recording of this song from the 1975 album Live! was released as a single and is the best-known version; it was later included on several compilation albums, including the greatest-hits compilation Legend. It was recorded at the Lyceum Theatre in London on 17 July 1975 as part of his Natty Dread Tour. Contemporary reggae artist Jimmy Cliff included a cover of the song on his 1975 album, Follow My Mind.

The live version of the song ranked No. 37 on Rolling Stone's 500 Greatest Songs of All Time.

In 2005, the live version of the song was inducted into the Grammy Hall of Fame.

== Writing and composition ==
Although Bob Marley is widely believed to have written the song, or at least the melody, songwriting credit was given to Vincent Ford, a friend of Marley's who ran a soup kitchen in Trenchtown, the ghetto of Kingston, Jamaica, where Marley grew up (he specifically mentions the Government Yards of Trenchtown, a public housing project). The royalty payments received by Ford ensured his efforts would continue.

The original studio version of the song used a drum machine. Jean Roussel provided the arrangement and Hammond organ parts for this recording. The title and main refrain, "No Woman, No Cry" is Jamaican Patois and means "Woman, don't cry", although it has sometimes mistakenly been understood to mean "if there is no woman, there is no reason to cry".

== Charts ==
Chart (1975)	Peak position
Australia (Kent Music Report)	97
Netherlands (Dutch Top 40)	23
UK Singles (OCC)	22

Chart (1981)	Peak position
New Zealand (Recorded Music NZ)	30
UK Singles (OCC)	8

== Certifications ==
Region	Certification	Certified units/sales
Brazil (Pro-Música Brasil)	Gold	30,000^{*}
Italy (FIMI)	Gold	15,000^{‡}
New Zealand (RMNZ)	2× Platinum	60,000^{‡}
Spain (Promusicae)	Gold	30,000^{‡}
United Kingdom (BPI)	Platinum	600,000^{‡}
^{*} Sales figures based on certification alone.^{‡} Sales+streaming figures based on certification alone.

== Fugees version ==
"No Woman, No Cry"

Single by Fugees

from the album The Score
- Released: 18 November 1996
- Genre: Reggae
- Length: 4:33
- Label: Ruffhouse
- Songwriter: Vincent Ford
- Producers: Wyclef Jean; Lauryn Hill; Pras; Jerry Duplessis

Fugees singles chronology
"Ready or Not" (1996)	"No Woman, No Cry" (1996)	"Rumble in the Jungle" (1997)

Music video
- "No Woman, No Cry" on YouTube

"No Woman, No Cry" was covered by American hip-hop group Fugees. It was released in November 1996, by Ruffhouse Records, as the fourth single from their second studio album, The Score (1996). The song was produced by Wyclef Jean and Lauryn Hill. Fugees' version of the track features Jean on lead vocals and changes the lyric "in a government yard in Trenchtown" to "in a government yard in Brooklyn." An official remix of the track, featuring Stephen Marley, was included on the group's third release, Bootleg Versions. Jean later recorded a solo version of the track for his 2003 anthology Greatest Hits.

Fugees' version was successful worldwide, peaking atop the New Zealand Singles Chart for two weeks, reaching number-two in the United Kingdom and becoming a top 40 hit in 13 additional countries. It did not chart on the US Billboard Hot 100 due to not receiving a physical release in the US, which at the time was a requirement for songs to appear on the Hot 100. It instead charted on the Billboard Hot 100 Airplay chart, peaking at number 38.

=== Critical reception ===
Larry Flick from Billboard magazine wrote, "Fugees continue to offer the hip-hop masses a thorough musical history—this time targeting Bob Marley's classic reggae hit 'No Woman, No Cry'. Steve Marley's heartwarming vocal similarity to his dad and Wyclef's present-day Brooklyn, N.Y.- project-sensitive lyrics successfully bind new jacks to dancehall's reggae origins. The music video for the single continues the legacy: Lauryn Hill gets her unique vocal swerve on with the Melody Makers in scenes reminiscent of Rita, Judy, and Marcia's I-Three days, and early Wailers footage interspersed with the collaborators' studio time supplies an overall tear-jerking, historic experience."

=== Track listings ===
- UK CD1
1. "No Woman, No Cry" (LP version) – 4:03
2. "No Woman, No Cry" (Remix) – 3:55
3. "No Woman, No Cry" (Remix instrumental) – 3:55
4. "Killing Me Softly" (Live) – 4:25
- UK CD2
1. "Don't Cry, Dry Your Eyes" – 5:03
2. "Don't Cry, Dry Your Eyes" (Instrumental) – 5:03
3. "No Woman, No Cry" (LP version) – 4:03
4. "A Change Is Gonna Come" (Live) – 6:04

=== Charts ===
==== Weekly charts ====
Weekly chart performance for the cover by the Fugees
Chart (1996–1997)	Peak position
Australia (ARIA)	20
Austria (Ö3 Austria Top 40)	40
Belgium (Ultratop 50 Flanders)	31
Belgium (Ultratop 50 Wallonia)	11
Denmark (IFPI)	7
Europe (Eurochart Hot 100)	14
Europe (European Dance Radio)	4
Europe (European Hit Radio) (Note: The Fugees' version remained at number five on the first week of a chart that replaced the EHR Top 50, the European Radio Top 50, January 25, 1997.)	5
Finland (Suomen virallinen lista)	6
France (SNEP)	12
Germany (GfK)	33
Iceland (Íslenski Listinn Topp 40)	2
Ireland (IRMA)	5
Israel (Israeli Singles Chart)	4
Italy (Musica e dischi)	15
Netherlands (Dutch Top 40)	21
Netherlands (Single Top 100)	22
New Zealand (Recorded Music NZ)	1
Scottish Singles Sales (Official Charts)	7
Sweden (Sverigetopplistan)	14
Switzerland (Schweizer Hitparade)	23
UK Singles (Official Charts)	2
UK Hip Hop/R&B (Official Charts)	1
UK Pop Tip Club Chart (Music Week)	26
US Radio Songs (Billboard)	38

==== Year-end charts ====
Year-end chart performance for the cover by the Fugees
Chart (1996)	Position
Iceland (Íslenski Listinn Topp 40)	15
UK Singles (OCC)	74

=== Certifications ===
Certifications and sales for "No Woman, No Cry"
Region	Certification	Certified units/sales
New Zealand (RMNZ)	Gold	5,000^{*}
United Kingdom (BPI)	Silver	200,000^{^}
^{*} Sales figures based on certification alone.^{^} Shipments figures based on certification alone.

== Wizkid version ==
In 2014, at Koga Studios for BBC 1Xtra Destination Africa live in Lagos, Nigeria, Wizkid took a creativity challenge that produced a mash-up of "Joy" and "No Woman, No Cry" The acoustic-backed cover was highly praised for its emotional depth and smooth Afrobeats blend. The infectious performance chronicled Wizkid's humble beginning and the role of a mother in guiding a child towards their dreams. It received critical acclaim by fans and critics who saw it as another extension of Wizkid's artistry.

== Tems version ==
"No Woman, No Cry"

Single by Tems and Marvel

from the EP Black Panther: Wakanda Forever Prologue
- Released: 25 July 2022
- Genre: Reggae; R&B
- Length: 3:34
- Label: Hollywood; Marvel Music
- Songwriter: Vincent Ford
- Producer: Ludwig Göransson

Tems singles chronology
"Wait for U" (2022)	"No Woman, No Cry" (2022)	"Free Mind" (2022)

"No Woman, No Cry" was covered by Nigerian singer Tems and Marvel Music for the soundtrack of the Marvel Cinematic Universe (MCU) film Black Panther: Wakanda Forever. It was produced by Ludwig Göransson and released on 25 July 2022 as the lead single off the EP. It received generally positive reception from fans who viewed the teaser trailer and it debuted at number one on the Billboard World Digital Song Sales chart.

=== Accolades ===
The song received several accolades, including the NAACP Image Award for Outstanding International Song and the All Africa Music Award for Best Soundtrack Movie Song.

=== Charts ===
Weekly chart performance for "No Woman, No Cry"
Chart (2022)	Peak position
US Afrobeats Songs (Billboard)	7
US Digital Song Sales (Billboard)	50
US World Digital Song Sales (Billboard)	1
