= When We Were Kings =

1996 American documentary film by Leon Gast

- Directed by: Leon Gast
- Produced by: Leon Gast; David Sonenberg; Taylor Hackford
- Starring: Muhammad Ali; George Foreman; James Brown; B.B. King; Norman Mailer; George Plimpton; Spike Lee; The Crusaders; The Spinners
- Cinematography: Maryse Alberti; Paul Goldsmith; Kevin Keating; Albert Maysles; Roderick Young
- Edited by: Leon Gast; Taylor Hackford; Jeffrey Levy-Hinte; Keith Robinson
- Production company: PolyGram Filmed Entertainment
- Distributed by: Gramercy Pictures
- Release dates: January 1996 (Sundance); October 25, 1996 (U.S.)
- Running time: 89 minutes
- Country: United States
- Language: English
- Box office: $2,789,985

When We Were Kings is a 1996 American documentary film directed by Leon Gast about the "Rumble in the Jungle" heavyweight championship boxing match that was held on October 30, 1974, in Zaire (now the Democratic Republic of the Congo) between world heavyweight champion George Foreman and Muhammad Ali. It features archival footage of celebrities, including James Brown, B.B. King, and promoter Don King, in the lead-up to the fight and accompanying Zaire 74 music festival, alongside interview footage of Norman Mailer, George Plimpton, Spike Lee, Malick Bowens and Thomas Hauser from the 1990s.

The film took Gast 22 years to edit and finance, but it was finally released to strong reviews and won the Academy Award for Best Documentary Feature of 1996.

== Subject matter ==
Norman Mailer, George Plimpton, Spike Lee, Malick Bowens, and Thomas Hauser were interviewed for the film in the 1990s. These interviews describe the historical importance of the fight, the questionable ethics of locating the fight in Zaire and accepting funding from the brutal dictator Mobutu Sese Seko, the fight itself, and, particularly, the interviewee's impressions of Ali. The interviews are accompanied by many news clips and photos to summarize Ali and Foreman's careers leading up to the Rumble.

During the buildup to the fight, Ali is shown trash-talking Foreman and talking about his beliefs regarding Africans and African-Americans in more private settings. He speaks of the inherent dignity of the native Africans and his hopes for African-Americans in the future. His relationship of mutual love with the people of Zaire is contrasted with Foreman's awkward and unsuccessful efforts to build his own popularity. Promoter Don King is seen working on his first big promotion.

Performers such as James Brown, B.B. King, and The Spinners are seen performing at Zaire 74, the "black Woodstock" soul music festival that was supposed to accompany the fight, but ended up preceding it by a month because Foreman was injured in training and the fight was delayed (the festival is more fully documented in the 2008 film Soul Power).

The film culminates with footage of much of the fight itself, interspersed with analysis of Ali's repeated use of the "right-hand lead" in the early rounds (a rarely used punch in professional boxing because it opens the boxer up for easy counterattacks, which Ali surmised would make it the punch for which Foreman was the least prepared) and his famous "rope-a-dope" strategy. This technique entailed Ali taking heavy blows from Foreman over several rounds while using his quick reflexes and the ropes to lessen their impact, which wore out Foreman. Ali knocked out Foreman in the eighth round, regaining the championship taken from him seven years earlier for his refusal to be drafted into the United States Army during the Vietnam War.

A soundtrack album for the film was released in 1997. It features live festival performances, in addition to new music by Zelma Davis, the duet "When We Were Kings" performed by Brian McKnight and Diana King, and "Rumble in the Jungle", the final recording done by The Fugees, in a collaboration with A Tribe Called Quest, Busta Rhymes, and John Forté.

== Awards and recognition ==
When We Were Kings is regarded as one of the best boxing documentaries ever made. It maintains a 98% positive rating at Rotten Tomatoes, with the website's critics consensus calling it "an engrossing documentary that's as much about a time and a place as it is about a fight" and received strong reviews from critics such as Roger Ebert and Edward Guthmann. It was nominated for the NAACP Image Award for Outstanding News, Talk or Information - Special in 1998, but lost to Dinner with Oprah: A Lifetime Exclusive - Toni Morrison.

The film won the 1996 Academy Award for Best Documentary Feature. At the presentation, both Ali and Foreman came up to join the filmmakers to make it clear they had long since made peace after the fight, with Foreman even helping Ali up the stairs. It was also nominated for the Grand Prix of the Belgian Syndicate of Cinema Critics.

== See also ==
- List of boxing films
- The television show Documentary Now! parodied this fight documentary in S4E4.
