= Vincent Ford =

Jamaican songwriter (1940–2008)

Vincent Ford (10 November 1940 – 28 December 2008), known as "Tata" or "Tartar", was a Jamaican songwriter who received a writing credit for "No Woman, No Cry", performed by Bob Marley & the Wailers, as well as three other Bob Marley songs. However, a dispute arose as to whether the compositions had actually been written by Marley himself, and credited to Ford to allow Marley to avoid contractual obligations.

== Biography ==
Vincent Ford was born on 10 November 1940. He used a wheelchair, having lost his legs due to diabetes. Despite his disability, he was still able to save another youth from drowning when he was a teenager. He ran a soup kitchen in Trenchtown.

Ford died at age 68 on 28 December 2008 in Kingston.

== Songwriting ==
Marley had signed a songwriting contract with producer Danny Sims at Cayman Music, and in 1972, Marley and the Wailers were signed by Chris Blackwell to Island Records.

Ford was given writing credit for "No Woman, No Cry" on the 1974 album Natty Dread, as well the songs "Crazy Baldhead" (with Marley's wife Rita), "Positive Vibration" and "Roots Rock Reggae" from the 1976 album Rastaman Vibration, along with "Inna de Red" and "Jah Bless" with Marley's son, Stephen.

Marley had not wanted his new songs to be associated with Cayman and it had been speculated, including in his obituary in The Independent, that he had put them in the names of his close friends and family members as a means of avoiding the contractual restrictions and as a way to "provide lasting help to family and close friends".

Marley's widow was sued by his former manager Danny Sims in a claim for royalty and ownership rights to these songs. Sims claimed that Marley had actually written the songs but had assigned the credit to Ford to avoid meeting obligations under Marley's contract with Sims. A 1987 court decision sided with the Marley estate, which assumed full control of the songs.

Marley historian Roger Steffens recounted that Marley had acknowledged in a 1975 Jamaica Broadcasting Corporation interview that he had written "No Woman, No Cry" while tuning a guitar in Tata's yard.

While in Trenchtown in the late 1970s, Marley biographer Vivien Goldman asked Ford point-blank "Was it you?" who wrote the songs. Ford never responded to the question directly, answering "Well, what do you think?" Goldman described Ford as "an unbroken link to a generation, many of whom are now gone", reminiscing that "The last time I saw him he was going into a Marley family gig in Kingston, and he was just borne along on a wave of youth, all admiring him and understanding what he’d come to represent." Given the collaborative nature of reggae, Goldman described how "That song may very well have been a conversation that they had sitting around one night. That's the way Bob's creativity worked. In the end it didn't matter. The point is Bob wanted him to have the money."
