= Fugees =

American hip-hop trio from New Jersey

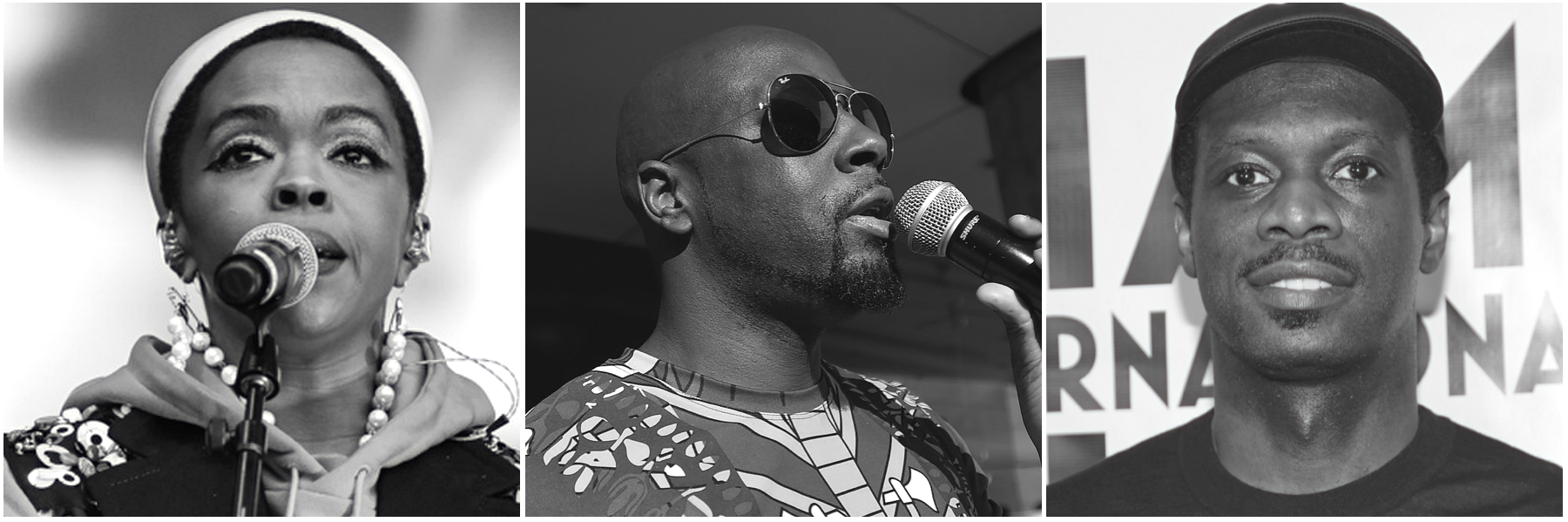
- Left to right: Lauryn Hill, Wyclef Jean, and Pras Michel

Background information
- Also known as: Tranzlator Crew; Refugee Camp
- Origin: South Orange, New Jersey, U.S.
- Genres: East Coast hip-hop; alternative hip-hop; progressive rap
- Works: Discography
- Years active: 1990–1998; 2004–2006; 2021–present
- Labels: Ruffhouse; Columbia
- Spinoffs: Refugee Camp All-Stars
- Members: Lauryn Hill; Wyclef Jean
- Past members: Pras Michel
- Website: thefugees.com

The Fugees (/ˈfuːdʒiːz/ FOO-jeez) are an American hip-hop group formed in South Orange, New Jersey, in 1990. The trio of Lauryn Hill, Wyclef Jean, and Pras Michel became known for their fusion of hip-hop and R&B with elements of reggae, soul and other musical styles across the African diaspora. Derived from "refugees", their name references Jean's immigrant background, his and Michel's Haitian heritage, and recurring themes of resilience. The group's socially conscious lyrics, eclectic sound, and use of live instrumentation stood apart during the gangsta rap-dominated era, establishing them as one of the most significant acts in alternative hip-hop.

Beginning their careers under the name Tranzlator Crew, the group signed with Ruffhouse Records, an imprint of Columbia. After working with Kool & the Gang's Ronald "Khalis" Bell, they adopted the name Fugees and released their debut album Blunted on Reality (1994). The album featured the singles "Nappy Heads" and "Vocab", with the former entering the Billboard Hot 100.

Their second album, The Score (1996), spawned the hit singles "Fu-Gee-La", "Killing Me Softly", and "Ready or Not". The New York Times described the Fugees as being "at the forefront of pop music" that same year. The Score peaked atop the Billboard 200 and was later certified 7× Platinum by the RIAA. It became the second rap album to receive a Grammy Award nomination for Album of the Year, and for a time held the title of the best-selling hip-hop album of all time.

Fugees collaborated with artists such as Simply Red on "Angel" and Busta Rhymes, A Tribe Called Quest, and John Forté on "Rumble in the Jungle", both of which reached the top five on the UK Singles Chart. They also formed the Refugee Camp All-Stars collective and subsequently staged the largest concert in Haitian history. The group disbanded shortly afterwards to pursue solo careers, with Jean's The Carnival (1997) featuring extensive contributions from all three members. They have periodically reunited for live performances, including Dave Chappelle's Block Party (2005).

Together they have received two Grammy Awards and a Brit Award, along with the Medal of Honor from Haitian President René Préval. Their music has appeared on Rolling Stone's 500 Greatest Albums and Songs lists, as well as the Rock and Roll Hall of Fame's Songs That Shaped Rock and Roll. Ranked among the greatest rap groups by publications such as Billboard and MTV, VH1 placed Fugees alongside Lauryn Hill at number 17 on its list of the 50 Greatest Hip-Hop Artists.

== History ==
=== 1990–1994: Formation and Blunted on Reality ===
Lauryn Hill and Pras first met at Columbia High School, in Maplewood, New Jersey. Pras, Lauryn, and a mutual friend Marcy Harriell formed a musical trio called Tyme; Wyclef Jean joined the line-up and Marcy left soon afterward, in 1990. The moniker Tranzlator Crew refers to the name of their band at the time, which included Johnny Wise on drums, Ti Bass (Jerry Duplessis) on bass guitar, and original DJ Hard Hittin Harry (Harry D'Janite). DJ Leon (Leon Higgins) joined the group in 1994 after Harry left to pursue a career as a publicist. In 1993, after some gigs and recorded demos, the trio signed to Ruffhouse, distributed through Columbia Records. The members then changed the group's name to Fugees, which was purposely taken from a word often used derogatorily to refer to Haitian-Americans (refugee). Refugee Camp, while a name sometimes credited to the trio, also refers to a number of artists affiliated with the members, and particularly Jean.

The trio soon changed musical direction, and released its first hip-hop LP, Blunted on Reality, under the guidance of Kool and the Gang's producer Ronald Bell. The group wrote and recorded the album in 1992 at the House of Music Studios in West Orange, New Jersey. However, due to a dispute with its record label, the album was not released until February 1, 1994. Fugees' members have subsequently said they allowed the producers too much control over the album's content and form. Although the album did not contain as many lyrics with overtly political messages as songs from their next and better-known album The Score, there were still political intentions. Though Blunted on Reality spawned the three singles "Boof Baf", "Vocab", and "Nappy Heads", they struggled to gain mainstream attention despite earning plaudits for its artistic quality and innovative use of samples. The album's most successful single was a remixed version of the song "Nappy Heads" produced by Salaam Remi. The remix peaked at number 49 on the Billboard Hot 100.

=== 1996–1998: The Score and breakup ===
The musical qualities of the first Fugees record were revisited with their sophomore effort The Score, which was released in February 1996, and became one of the biggest hits of 1996 and one of the best-selling hip-hop albums of all time. The Fugees first gained attention for its cover versions of old favorites, with the group's reinterpretations of "No Woman, No Cry" by Bob Marley & the Wailers and "Killing Me Softly with His Song" (first recorded by Lori Lieberman in 1971, remade by Roberta Flack in 1973), the latter being their biggest hit.

The album also included a re-interpretation of The Delfonics' "Ready or Not Here I Come (Can't Hide From Love)" in their hit single, "Ready or Not", which featured a prominent sample of Enya's "Boadicea" without the singer's permission. This prompted a lawsuit resulting in a settlement where Enya was given credit and royalties for her sample. The group members have continuously thanked and praised Enya for her deep understanding of the situation, for example in the liner notes of The Score. The Fugees won two 1997 Grammy Awards with The Score (Best Rap Album) and "Killing Me Softly" (Best R&B Vocal Performance by a Duo or Group).

In 1997, Fugees were featured on the song "Hip-Hopera" by Bounty Killer, which spent five weeks on the Billboard Hot 100 chart, peaking at number 81. The group also recorded the song "Rumble in the Jungle" featuring Busta Rhymes, A Tribe Called Quest & John Forté, for the 1996 documentary When We Were Kings. They produced remixes of Michael Jackson's "Blood on the Dance Floor" and "2 Bad".

Later that year, Fugees each began solo projects: Hill began writing and producing for a number of artists (including Whitney Houston, Aretha Franklin and Mary J. Blige) and started work on her critically acclaimed The Miseducation of Lauryn Hill; Jean also began producing for a number of artists (including Canibus, Destiny's Child and Carlos Santana) and released his debut album Wyclef Jean Presents The Carnival; Pras, with Mýa and Ol' Dirty Bastard, recorded the single "Ghetto Supastar (That Is What You Are)" for the soundtrack to the film Bulworth. In 1998 they reunited to shoot a music video for the song "Just Happy to Be Me" which appeared in the Sesame Street special Elmopalooza, and also on the Grammy Award-winning soundtrack album.

=== 2006–present: Later years ===
The three Fugees reunited and performed on September 18, 2004, at the concert in Bedford-Stuyvesant, Brooklyn featured in the film Dave Chappelle's Block Party (2004), headlining a star-studded bill that included Kanye West, Mos Def, Jill Scott, Erykah Badu, The Roots, Talib Kweli, Common, Big Daddy Kane, Dead Prez, Cody ChesnuTT and John Legend. Their performance received several positive reviews, many of which praised Hill's near a cappella rendition of "Killing Me Softly".

Fugees made their first televised appearance in almost 10 years at BET's 2005 Music Awards on June 28, opening the show with a 12-minute set. With a new album announced to be in the works, their final track, "Take It Easy", was leaked online and eventually released as an Internet single on September 27, 2005. It peaked at number 40 on the Billboard R&B Chart.

In November 2005, the Fugees embarked on a European tour – the members' first together since 1997 – from 30 November to 20 December, playing in Finland, Austria, Norway, Germany, Italy, France, the United Kingdom, Belgium, Denmark, Sweden, Switzerland and Slovakia. The group had been scheduled to play at the Hammersmith Apollo on November 25, 2005; however, it was forced to move the gig to December due to production issues. The tour received mixed reviews. On February 6, 2006, the group reunited for a free show in Hollywood, with tickets given away to about 8,000 fans by local radio stations. Later that month, a new track called "Foxy" was leaked, a song dubbed the "real return of the Fugees" by several online music blogs.

However, following the reunion tour, the album that was said to be in the works did not materialize and was postponed indefinitely, as relationships between band members apparently deteriorated. During the recording of the album, the group was plagued with creative differences. They recorded a song titled "Lips Don't Lie", but Hill did not like the song and, after some disagreements over it, the group disbanded again. The song was ultimately given to singer Shakira with featured vocals by Jean and, after the title was changed to "Hips Don't Lie", the song was released as a single and became a global hit. In August 2007, a year after the group's second disbandment, Pras stated, "Before I work with Lauryn Hill again, you will have a better chance of seeing Osama bin Laden and [George W.] Bush in Starbucks having a latte, discussing foreign policies, before there will be a Fugees reunion". Meanwhile, in September 2007, an equally outspoken Wyclef told Blues & Soul: "I feel the first issue that needs to be addressed is that Lauryn needs help... In my personal opinion, those Fugees reunion shows shouldn't have been done, because we wasn't ready. I really felt we shoulda first all gone into a room with Lauryn and a psychiatrist... But, you know, I do believe Lauryn can get help. And, once she does work things out, hopefully a proper and enduring Fugees reunion will happen." On July 15, 2017, an old song by the Fugees was leaked on Hot 97 radio; this led to reports that the group was reforming, which were later denied by group members on Twitter.

After the group split, Wyclef Jean co-founded and headed the Yele Haiti Foundation, a non-profit organization "focusing on emergency relief, employment, youth development and education, and tree planting and agriculture" in Haiti. Pras starred in a documentary about homelessness in Los Angeles and remained outspoken about Haitian politics. Lauryn Hill continued recording and performing socially conscious music and went on to advocate for female empowerment especially within the music industry. The Fugees also turned their recording studio, the Booga Basement, into a transitional house for young Haitian refugees immigrating to the United States.

In September 2021, the Fugees announced a reunion tour to celebrate 25 years of their album, The Score. On Friday, October 29, 2021, the Fugees announced that their reunion tour dates were postponed to early 2022. However, on January 21, 2022, the Fugees released a statement saying they would not be going on tour due to the COVID-19 pandemic. The tour was rescheduled and set to begin in August 2024 but was quietly canceled three days before the first show, with no reason given to customers receiving refunds. The UK leg of the tour did go ahead as planned. On November 20, 2025, member Pras was sentenced to 14 years in prison after being found guilty of 10 criminal counts related to involvement in the 1Malaysia Development Berhad scandal in the U.S. District Court for the District of Columbia. On February 1, 2026, Hill and Jean reunited to perform a tribute to D'Angelo and Roberta Flack at the 68th Annual Grammy Awards. On September 4, 2026, Hill and Jean made a guest appearance during JAY-Z's JAY-Z30 concert in London.

== Legacy ==
The Fugees have often been referred to as one of the most influential and significant groups of the 1990s, with Billboard stating "their influence on modern hip-hop and R&B music is undeniable". They are often considered to be one of the definitive alternative hip-hop acts, being one of the first alternative hip-hop acts to break into the mainstream. According to Forbes, their success helped establish Ruffhouse Records as a major record label. Consequence noted the Fugees for putting Haiti on the hip-hop map. Alternative Press argued that the group paved the way for modern alternative music and stated "If you listen to modern hip-hop today, so many of the new faces went to the Fugees' School of Songwriting."

Matthew Ismael Ruiz of Pitchfork noted the group had removed negative connotations of Haitian immigration and the word 'Refugee', stating that "The Fugees managed to diversify the voice of the ghetto, one often depicted in a single dimension. They reclaimed pride for Haitians worldwide, a heritage maligned for its postcolonial poverty and strife but still remembered as the setting for the new world's first successful revolt of enslaved people against their oppressors. Their sound was multifaceted because they were, too, their music diverse, just like the Black experience." The Ringer noted that the Fugees delivered political messages and brought hip-hop to the mainstream in their music by blending elements of pop, soul, dancehall and Caribbean music, making it more palpable for a wider audience without making the message dense, stating "the Fugees disguised resistance as art, the same way that enslaved Africans once hid martial arts from their colonial masters by pretending that they were a dance."

Writing for The Recording Academy, music journalist Kathy Iandoli wrote about the impact of the group on the hip-hop genre stating:

"As hip-hop's East and West Coasts continued their tussle, their lighter-hearted approach to socially conscious rap curtailed any overarching assumptions that hip-hop was going down a "bad road". Plus, they had Lauryn Hill, who doubled as a songbird and lyrical spitfire. Together, by juxtaposing live instrumentation, soulful melodies and abstract bars, The Fugees gave hip-hop a renewed spirit and propelled it to a different kind of mainstream".

The group has sold over twenty-two million records worldwide, and are one of the biggest-selling hip-hop groups of all time. Multiple recording artists have cited the Fugees as an influence, including Bono, Drake, Kanye West, Akon, Black Eyed Peas, Young Thug, Bridgit Mendler, Sean Kingston, Ava Max, Doja Cat, Bastille, The Kid Laroi, Post Malone, DJ Khaled, and Diplo.

The impact of the Fugees has been compared to that of the Beatles, with U2's Bono calling them hip-hop's version of the Beatles. Daryl McIntosh of Albumism compared the public response from the group's sophomore album, The Score to that of Beatlemania, referring to it as "Fugee-mania". Former United States President Barack Obama, named the Fugees single "Ready or Not" his favorite song ever. Their album The Score was placed on the list of 200 Definitive Albums in the Rock and Roll Hall of Fame (2007) by National association of recording merchandisers (NARM). "Ready or Not" was named among the Songs that Shaped Rock and Roll (2018) by the Rock and Roll Hall of Fame. The following year, they were inducted into the N.J. Pop & Rock Hall.

A photograph of the group taken in 1994 has been stored and collected by the Smithsonian National Museum of African American History and Culture. In 2020, The Score ranked 134th on the revised version of Rolling Stone's 500 Greatest Albums of All Time. The following year, their version of "Killing Me Softly" was placed on the revised version of Rolling Stone's 500 Greatest Songs of All Time. MTV ranked it the ninth-greatest hip-hop group of all time (2007). BET placed the group on its list of 'Hip Hop's Greatest Trios' (2012).

== Discography ==
- Blunted on Reality (1994)
- The Score (1996)
