= Mark Woollen =

American director

- Occupations: Movie trailer director; editor
- Years active: 1993–present
- Known for: Founder of Mark Woollen & Associates
- Website: mwatrailers.com

Mark Woollen is an American director and editor of movie trailers. He is the founder of Mark Woollen & Associates, an agency that specializes in the creation of movie trailers. Through the agency, Woollen has created trailers for films and television series like Schindler's List, The Social Network, The Tree of Life, Big Little Lies, Ozark, Severance, and numerous others.

== Early life and education ==
Woollen grew up largely in the San Fernando Valley in Los Angeles County. He attended El Camino Real High School in Woodland Hills, Los Angeles, where he took four years of film and television production classes.

== Career ==
Woollen started his career as an editor with Craig Murray Productions. He worked on several Disney films, including Beauty and the Beast. He later moved on to Universal, where he began cutting together trailers. At age 22 in 1993, Woollen's trailer cut for Schindler's List was chosen by director Steven Spielberg. After Schindler's List, Woollen became a freelance creator of movie trailers, ultimately forming the agency, Mark Woollen & Associates. He operated the firm out of his home in Los Angeles before moving to an office space in Santa Monica in 2002.

Through his agency, he created trailers for films like Lost in Translation, Eternal Sunshine of the Spotless Mind, Garden State, and Little Children (2006). In 2006, Woollen directed the feature documentary film, Jam, which follows the lives of aging roller derby players and won the Grand Jury Prize at SXSW.

Woollen's 2011 trailer for The Social Network used a cover of Radiohead's "Creep" by Scala & Kolacny Brothers, a Belgian women's choir. He is often credited with starting a trend of cover songs being used as the backdrop for trailers. The Social Network trailer won "Best in Show" at the 2011 Golden Trailer Awards, and Woollen received five other awards at the event. In the ensuing years, Woollen would continue work on trailers for films, including 12 Years a Slave (2013), Birdman (2014), Gone Girl (2014), Moonlight (2016), Nomadland, and others. He also began working on teasers and trailers for television series, Ozark, and Severance.

== Filmography ==
List of feature films
Year	Title	Role	Notes
2006	Jam	Director	Documentary
2017	Big Little Lies	Creative director	TV Series
2018	Sharp Objects	Creative director	TV Mini Series
2019	The Dark Crystal: Age of Resistance	Creative director	TV Series

== Awards ==
Woollen has won multiple industry awards, including Best in Show awards for campaigns for Schindler’s List, The Social Network, and A Star Is Born.
