= Blunted on Reality =

Studio album by Fugees
- Released: January 25, 1994
- Recorded: June 1992 – June 1993
- Genre: Hip-hop
- Length: 70:50
- Label: Ruffhouse
- Producers: Pras; Wyclef Jean; Khalis Bayyan; Salaam Remi; Brand X; Stephen Walker; Rashad Muhammad

Fugees chronology
Blunted on Reality (1994)	The Score (1996)

Singles from Blunted on Reality
- 1. "Boof Baf" Released: October 19, 1993; 2. "Nappy Heads" Released: February 1, 1994; 3. "Vocab" Released: October 18, 1994

Blunted on Reality is the debut studio album released by the American hip-hop group Fugees. The album was released in January 1994 through the Ruffhouse Records label. Three singles were released from the album, including ”Boof Baf”, ”Nappy Heads” and ”Vocab”.

Blunted on Reality received generally favorable reviews from music critics. In the United Kingdom the album has been certified silver by the British Phonographic Industry. It was followed up with the critically acclaimed second and final album The Score in 1996.

== Background ==
Blunted on Reality was written and subsequently recorded by the Fugees in 1992-1993. However, following a long dispute with their record label, the album was not released until January 25, 1994.

Most versions of the album contain eighteen tracks, with the addition of a remix of "Nappy Heads" by Salaam Remi. Prior to the release of the album, "Boof Baf" was released as the album's lead single. Commercially, the single was unsuccessful. The album's highest charting single is "Nappy Heads", which peaked at number 49 on the Billboard Hot 100. "Vocab" was released as the album's third and final single. However, the song was not successful on the Billboard Hot 100 chart.

The album was recorded at the House of Music Studios in West Orange, New Jersey. The Fugees have subsequently said that they allowed the producers to have too much control over the album's content and form.

== Themes ==
While Blunted on Reality does not contain nearly as many overtly political lyrics as The Score, the album is still political. Wyclef Jean described the meaning of the title of the album in a 1994 interview on the topical talk show program, Lorna's Corner: “When the cop is messing around with somebody for something that the person didn’t do and they try to set ‘em up, that makes me blunted on reality. When the government is taking money on arms…and that money could be going back to the community it makes me blunted on reality. It’s just awareness of what’s going on…that’s what blunted on reality means…It don’t mean that I smoke weed…cause I’m too paranoid as it is.”

== Reception ==
Professional ratings
Initial reviews (in 1994/1995)
Review scores
Source	Rating
Christgau's Consumer Guide	(1-star Honorable Mention)
Melody Maker	(favorable)
The New York Times	(favorable)
Q	4/5 stars
Rhapsody	(favorable)
Select	3/5 medals
The Source	3/5 stars
Vibe	(favorable)

Professional ratings
Retrospective reviews (after 1994/1995)
Review scores
Source	Rating
AllMusic	2.5/5 stars
Pitchfork	7.6/10
Rolling Stone	3/5 stars
Yahoo! Music	(favorable)

Before the release of their critically acclaimed second album, The Score in 1996, the album had sold an estimated 12,000 copies. Since then, the album has sold roughly 130,000 copies in the United States.

== Track listing ==
#	Title	Producer(s)	Performer(s)
1	"Introduction"		Lauryn Hill, Wyclef Jean & Pras Michel
2	"Nappy Heads"	Brand X, Pras, Rashad Muhammad & Wyclef Jean	Lauryn Hill, Wyclef Jean & Pras Michel
3	"Blunted" (Interlude)/"Blunted On Reality" (unlisted)	Pras & Wyclef Jean; Co-Producer: Khalis Bayyan	Lauryn Hill, Wyclef Jean & Pras Michel
4	"Recharge"	Khalis Bayyan, Pras & Wyclef Jean	Lauryn Hill, Wyclef Jean & Pras Michel
5	"Freestyle" (Interlude)		Wyclef Jean & Pras Michel
6	"Vocab"	Pras & Wyclef Jean	Lauryn Hill, Wyclef Jean & Pras Michel
7	"Special News Bulletin" (Interlude)	Khalis Bayyan, Wyclef Jean & Pras Michel	Lauryn Hill, Wyclef Jean & Pras Michel
8	"Boof Baf"	Khalis Bayyan, Pras & Wyclef Jean	Lauryn Hill, Wyclef Jean, Pras Michel & Mad Spida
9	"Temple"	Pras & Wyclef Jean; Co-Producer: Khalis Bayyan	Lauryn Hill, Wyclef Jean & Pras Michel
10	"How Hard Is It?"	Khalis Bayyan, Pras & Wyclef Jean	Wyclef Jean, Pras Michel & Lauryn Hill
11	"Harlem Chit Chat" (Interlude)		Rashad Muhammad
12	"Some Seek Stardom"	Rashad Muhammad & Stephen Walker	Lauryn Hill
13	"Giggles"	Pras & Wyclef Jean; Co-Producers: Khalis Bayyan & Rashad Muhammad	Pras Michel; chorus: Lauryn Hill
14	"Da Kid from Haiti" (Interlude)		Lauryn Hill, Wyclef Jean & Pras Michel
15	"Refugees on the Mic"	Pras & Wyclef Jean; Co-Producer: Khalis Bayyan	Lauryn Hill, Wyclef Jean & Pras Michel
16	"Living Like There Ain't No Tomorrow"	Pras & Wyclef Jean	Wyclef Jean
17	"Shout Outs from the Block"		Wyclef Jean, Lauryn Hill, Pras Michel & uncredited guests
18	"Nappy Heads" (Remix)	Salaam Remi	Lauryn Hill, Wyclef Jean & Pras Michel

== Charts ==
=== Weekly charts ===
Chart (1994)	Peak position
UK Album Charts	122
US Top R&B/Hip-Hop Albums (Billboard)	62

=== Singles ===
List of chart performances of all singles from album
Title	Year	Peak chart positions		
Title	Year	US	US R&B	UK
"Boof Baf"	1993	—	—	—
"Nappy Heads"	1994	49	52	172
"Vocab"^{[A]}	1994	108	91	—

== Certifications ==
Region	Certification	Certified units/sales
France (SNEP)	Gold	100,000^{*}
United Kingdom (BPI)	Silver	60,000^{^}
^{*} Sales figures based on certification alone.^{^} Shipments figures based on certification alone.

== Notes ==
- A "Vocab" did not enter the Billboard Hot 100, but peaked at number 8 on the Bubbling Under Hot 100 Singles chart, which acts as an extension to the Hot 100.
