= Fu-Gee-La =

1995 single by Fugees

Single by Fugees

from the album The Score
- Released: December 13, 1995
- Length: 4:20
- Label: Ruffhouse; Columbia
- Songwriters: Nel Jean; Prakazrel Michel; Lauryn Hill; Allen McGrier; Mary Brockert; Salaam Gibbs; Homer Banks; Carl Hampton; Raymond Jackson
- Producer: Salaam Remi

Fugees singles chronology
"Refugees on the Mic" (1994)	"Fu-Gee-La" (1995)	"Killing Me Softly" (1996)

Music video
- "Fu-Gee-La" on YouTube

"Fu-Gee-La" is a song by American hip-hop trio, Fugees, released on December 13, 1995, by Ruffhouse and Columbia Records as the lead single from their second and final album, The Score (1996). Produced by Salaam Remi, it contains a sample of "If Loving You Is Wrong (I Don't Want to Be Right)" by Ramsey Lewis, while its chorus contains an interpolation of "Ooo La La La" by Teena Marie.

Several remixes of the song, including the "Refugee Camp Remix" and the "Sly & Robbie Remix", which features a young Akon, also appear on The Score. "Fu-Gee-La" became a Top 40 success, climbing to numbers 19 and 29 on the US Cash Box Top 100 and Billboard Hot 100 charts, while peaking at number two on the Hot Rap Songs and topping the Dance Singles Sales chart. It was later certified platinum by the Recording Industry Association of America (RIAA). Internationally, the song reached the top ten in several countries, including Germany, Belgium, the Netherlands and Sweden.

The music video was filmed in Jamaica and was inspired by Jimmy Cliff's 1972 film The Harder They Come.

== Background ==
Producer Salaam Remi discussed the song's conception: "We actually were working on a song for Spike Lee's Clockers movie that actually, that song never came out. So we had a song that we did for Clockers, and then during that session, Wyclef was like, 'Yo, play that beat you did for Fat Joe!' And Lauryn was like, 'Yo, play the Fat Joe beat' and then when I played it, Clef jumped up and spit the first verse to 'Fu-Gee-La.' He had the verse, but it just fell all together and then we worked on it. That song was actually done prior to The Score, so a lot of The Score’s vibe was based around what that song was."

== Critical reception ==
Larry Flick from Billboard magazine stated that "Fu-Gee-La" "delivers the dope and then some: The Fugees' trademark tight, creative lyrics find a perfect home in the recycled hook from Teena Marie's 1988 No. 1 R&B hit, 'Ooo La La La'." He added that it "should be a no-brainer for urban programmers". Michael Hill from Cash Box named it one of the "memorable tracks" of The Score album. Neil Kulkarni from Melody Maker named it Single of the Week, writing that the trio "return with a wicked track, Wyclef & Prakazrel's rapping as incisive as ever and Lauryn's vocals the same fluid mix of swoonsome melody and lyrical sharpness." In December 1996, Melody Maker ranked "Fu-Gee-La" number 45 in their list of "Singles of the Year", adding, "A typically cool and tuneful offering from the year's rap phenomenon, featuring that slinky backbeat and Lauryn's crystal vocals." David Fricke from Rolling Stone also complimented "the sweet heat" of Hill's alto.

== Music video ==
The accompanying music video for "Fu-Gee-La" was filmed in Jamaica. The Fugees wanted to recreate Jimmy Cliff's film The Harder They Come (1972). It follows a robbery-related concept, with each band member taking on a particular role.

== Track listing ==
- UK CD1
1. "Fu-Gee-La" (Album Version) – 4:15
2. "Fu-Gee-La" (North Side Mix) – 4:15
3. "Fu-Gee-La" (Refugee Camp Remix) – 4:24
4. "Fu-Gee-La" (Sly & Robbie Mix) – 5:33
5. "Fu-Gee-La" (Wyclef's Global Acoustic Mix) – 4:18
6. "Fu-Gee-La" (Fugi Acapella) – 4:08
- UK CD2
1. "Fu-Gee-La" (Album Version) – 4:15
2. "Fu-Gee-La" (Album Instrumental) – 4:15
3. "Fu-Gee-La" (Refugee Camp Remix) – 4:24
4. "Fu-Gee-La" (Refugee Camp Instrumental) – 4:22
5. "Fu-Gee-La" (North Side Mix) – 4:15
6. "Fu-Gee-La" (Sly & Robbie Mix) – 5:33
7. "How Many Mics" – 4:22

== Charts ==
=== Weekly charts ===
Chart (1996)	Peak position
Australia (ARIA)	43
Austria (Ö3 Austria Top 40)	14
Belgium (Ultratop 50 Flanders)	14
Belgium (Ultratop 50 Wallonia)	8
Europe (Eurochart Hot 100)	26
Europe (European Dance Radio)	12
Finland (Suomen virallinen lista)	16
France (SNEP)	22
Germany (GfK)	6
Israel (Israeli Singles Chart)	27
Netherlands (Dutch Top 40)	7
Netherlands (Single Top 100)	5
New Zealand (Recorded Music NZ)	11
Scottish Singles Sales (Official Charts)	38
Sweden (Sverigetopplistan)	10
Switzerland (Schweizer Hitparade)	9
UK Singles (Official Charts)	21
UK Dance (Official Charts)	10
UK Hip Hop/R&B (Official Charts)	4
UK Club Chart (Music Week)	56
US Billboard Hot 100	29
US Dance Singles Sales (Billboard)	1
US Hot R&B/Hip-Hop Songs (Billboard)	13
US Hot Rap Songs (Billboard)	2
US Cash Box Top 100	19

=== Year-end charts ===
Chart (1996)	Position
Belgium (Ultratop 50 Flanders)	92
Belgium (Ultratop 50 Wallonia)	53
Germany (Media Control)	41
Netherlands (Dutch Top 40)	63
Netherlands (Single Top 100)	56
Sweden (Topplistan)	57
US Hot R&B Singles (Billboard)	75
US Hot Rap Singles (Billboard)	15
US Maxi-Singles Sales (Billboard)	10

== Release history ==
Region	Date	Format(s)	Label(s)	Ref.
United States	December 13, 1995	—N/a	Ruffhouse; Columbia	
United States	January 16, 1996	Rhythmic contemporary radio	Ruffhouse; Columbia	
United Kingdom	March 25, 1996	12-inch vinyl; CD; cassette	Ruffhouse; Columbia	

== Certifications ==
Region	Certification	Certified units/sales
Germany (BVMI)	Gold	250,000^{^}
United Kingdom (BPI)	Silver	200,000^{‡}
United States (RIAA)	Platinum	1,000,000^{‡}
^{^} Shipments figures based on certification alone.^{‡} Sales+streaming figures based on certification alone.
