= Nappy Heads =

Single by Fugees

from the album Blunted on Reality
- B-side: "Some Seek Stardom"
- Released: February 1, 1994
- Recorded: 1992
- Genre: Hip-hop
- Length: 5:43 (album version); 4:38 (single edit)
- Label: Ruffhouse
- Songwriters: Lauryn Hill; Pras Michel; Wyclef Jean
- Producers: Brand X; Rashad Muhammad; Pras Michel; Wyclef Jean; Salaam Remi

Fugees singles chronology
"Boof Baf" (1993)	"Nappy Heads" (1994)	"Vocab" (1994)

Music video
- "Nappy Heads" on YouTube

"Nappy Heads" is a song written and performed by American hip-hop group Fugees, released in February 1994 by Ruffhouse Records as the second single from the group's debut album Blunted on Reality (1994). The original version of the song was co-produced by group members Pras and Wyclef Jean and written by singer Lauryn Hill. "Nappy Heads" was recorded at House of Music Studios in West Orange, New Jersey. However, the more-well known, definitive remix version (titled "Nappy Heads – Remix") was produced by Salaam Remi. The song became the group's first entry on the US Billboard Hot 100, peaking at number 49. It also reached number one on the Billboard Hot Dance Music/Maxi-Singles Sales chart.

== Music video ==
The official music video for "Nappy Heads" was directed by Max Malkin. It was nominated for New Artist Clip of the Year in the category for Rap at the 1994 Billboard Music Video Awards. Segments of the video were filmed on the campus of Columbia University in front of Low Library.

== Charts ==
=== Weekly charts ===
Weekly chart performance for "Nappy Heads"
Chart (1994)	Peak position
UK Club Chart (Music Week)	68
US Billboard Hot 100	49
US Hot Dance Music/Maxi-Singles Sales (Billboard)	1
US Hot R&B/Hip-Hop Singles & Tracks (Billboard)	52
US Hot Rap Singles (Billboard)	12
US Radio Songs (Billboard)	68

=== Year-end charts ===
Year-end chart performance for "Nappy Heads"
Chart (1994)	Position
US Maxi-Singles Sales (Billboard)	5
