= Vocab (song) =

Single by Fugees

from the album Blunted on Reality
- B-side: "Refugees on the Mic"
- Released: October 18, 1994
- Recorded: 1992
- Genre: Hip-hop
- Length: 5:02 (album version); 4:16 (single edit)
- Label: Ruffhouse
- Songwriter: Fugees
- Producers: Pras Michel; Wyclef Jean, Salaam Remi

Fugees singles chronology
"Nappy Heads" (1994)	"Vocab" (1994)	"Refugees on the Mic" (1994)

Music video
- "Vocab" (album version) on YouTube, "Vocab" (single edit) on YouTube

"Vocab" is a song written and performed by American hip-hop group Fugees. It was issued in October 1994 by Ruffhouse Records as the third single from the group's debut album, Blunted on Reality (1994). The song was co-produced by Pras and Wyclef Jean. Similar to the group's previous single, Nappy Heads, "Vocab" is best-known for its remixes, which were both co-produced by Salaam Remi and the Fugees. The song peaked at number 22 on the Billboard Hot Rap Singles chart in 1995.

== Critical reception ==
Larry Flick from Billboard magazine wrote, "For those who seek intelligent, intriguing rap, this is as good as it gets. The weird sounds and grooves will appeal to nappy heads and Deadheads alike. A freaky funk beat is interrupted midway by a jilted rendition of the Police song 'Roxanne'. Then, the beat resumes and the stream-of-conscious oddness continues. Expand your soul."

== Music video ==
The official music video for "Vocab" was directed by Max Malkin. The video was partially filmed in East Harlem in 1994.

== Charts ==
Chart (1994)	Peak position
US Hot Dance Music/Maxi-Singles Sales (Billboard)	21

Chart (1995)	Peak position
US Hot R&B/Hip-Hop Singles & Tracks (Billboard)	91
US Hot Rap Singles (Billboard)	22
