= Jerry Wonda discography =

Jerry "Wonda" Duplessis discography
- Studio albums: 6
- Extended plays: 1
- Compilation albums: 1
- Singles: 25

This is the discography of Haitian–American producer, musician and songwriter Jerry "Wonda" Duplessis. Releases by The Fugees are listed on their article page.

== Albums ==
=== Studio albums ===
Year	Album	Chart positions				Certifications
Year	Album	US	U.S. R&B	CAN	UK	Certifications
1997	The Carnival: Released: June 24, 1997	16	4	—	40	US: 2× Platinum; CAN: Platinum
2000	The Ecleftic: 2 Sides II a Book: Released: July 25, 2000	9	3	7	5	US: Platinum; CAN: Gold; UK: Silver
2002	Masquerade: Released: July 18, 2002	6	2	—	30	
2003	The Preacher's Son: Released: October 7, 2003	22	5	—	—	
2004	Welcome to Haiti: Creole 101: Released: October 5, 2004	—	—	—	—	
2007	Carnival Vol. II: Memoirs of an Immigrant: Released: December 4, 2007	28	9	—	—	
2010	Wyclef Jean: Released: — (Due 2010)	—	—	—	—	

=== Compilation albums ===
Year	Album	Chart positions			
Year	Album	US	U.S. R&B	CAN	UK
2003	Greatest Hits: Released: October 7, 2003	—	—	—	—

=== EPs ===
Year	Album	Chart positions			
Year	Album	US	U.S. R&B	CAN	UK
2009	From the Hut, To the Projects, To the Mansion: Released: November 10, 2009	171	36	—	—
