= Gone till November =

1997 single by Wyclef Jean

Single by Wyclef Jean

from the album The Carnival
- B-side: "No Airplay"
- Released: 25 November 1997
- Length: 3:28
- Label: Columbia, Ruffhouse
- Songwriters: Wyclef Jean, Jerry Duplessis
- Producers: Wyclef Jean, Jerry "Wonda" Duplessis

Wyclef Jean singles chronology
"No, No, No" (1997)	"Gone till November" (1997)	"Cheated (To All the Girls)" (1998)

"Gone till November" a song by Haitian rapper Wyclef Jean, released as the third single from his debut solo album The Carnival (1997). The song was released on 25 November 1997 by Columbia and Ruffhouse, and peaked at number three on the UK Singles Chart, becoming Jean's highest-charting solo hit in the UK alongside 2000's "It Doesn't Matter". In the United States, the song peaked at number seven on the Billboard Hot 100 chart. It reached number four in both Canada and New Zealand.

The album version differs from the more-familiar pop version found on the single and used in the video. The album version has a different bass line and more, different, voiceover. The pop version is more recognizable due to radio play but is not found on the actual album. Both album and pop versions differ from the "remix" version.

== Composition ==
The orchestral accompaniment, which was arranged and conducted by Sonny Kompanek, was performed by the New York Philharmonic Orchestra.

== Chart performance ==
"Gone till November" peaked at number seven on the US Billboard Hot 100 and spent a total of 20 weeks on the chart. It also peaked at number nine on the US Hot R&B/Hip-Hop Songs chart. In the UK, the song debuted at number three on the UK Singles Chart and spent a total of nine weeks on the chart. This became Wyclef's highest-charting single on the chart. The single was eventually certified platinum by the Recording Industry Association of America (RIAA) for sales of over a million copies in the United States.

== Critical reception ==
British magazine Music Week wrote, "This laidback ode to a footloose lifestyle by the Fugees rapper is desperately catchy and features pleasing arrangements, but somehow seems a bit lifeless."

== Remix ==
The remix of "Gone till November" features R. Kelly and Canibus, with backing vocals by Destiny's Child, and contains interpolations of the songs "Michelle" by the Beatles and "Karma Chameleon" by Culture Club. A separate music video was also made for the remix version.

== Music video ==
The music video for "Gone till November", directed by Francis Lawrence, was filmed at Los Angeles International Airport (LAX) on 20 November 1997, and released in December 1997. It features a cameo appearance by Bob Dylan when Wyclef sings, "knockin' on heaven's door like I'm Bob Dylan." Canibus and Destiny's Child also make appearances respectively, but R. Kelly does not.

== Track listings ==
- US CD and cassette single; UK cassette single
1. "Gone till November" (pop version) – 3:27
2. "Gone till November" (The Makin' Runs remix) – 4:05
- US maxi-CD single
1. "Gone till November" (The Makin' Runs remix) – 4:05
2. "No Airplay" – 4:42
3. "Gone till November" (The Makin' Runs remix instrumental) – 3:42
4. "No Airplay" (instrumental) – 4:38
5. "Gone till November" (pop version) – 3:27
- US 12-inch single

A1. "Gone till November" (The Makin' Runs remix) – 4:05
A2. "No Airplay" – 4:42
A3. "Gone till November" (LP version) – 3:27
B1. "Gone till November" (The Makin' Runs remix instrumental) – 3:42
B2. "No Airplay" (instrumental) – 4:38
B3. "Gone till November" (The Makin' Runs remix a cappella) – 4:58

- European CD single
1. "Gone till November" (radio edit) – 3:16
2. "Gone till November" (The Makin' Runs remix) – 4:05
- UK CD1
1. "Gone till November" (album version) – 3:28
2. "Gone till November" (pop version) – 3:27
3. "No Airplay" – 4:42
4. "Bubblegoose" (Bakin' Cake version) – 3:30
- UK CD2
1. "Gone till November" (The Makin' Runs remix) – 4:05
2. "Gone till November" (The Makin' Runs remix instrumental) – 3:42
3. "Guantanamera" (Roxanne, Roxanne / Oye Como Va remix) – 4:17
4. "No Airplay – Men in Blue" (featuring Youssou N'Dour) – 4:46
- Australian CD single
1. "Gone till November" (radio edit) – 3:16
2. "Gone till November" (The Makin' Runs remix) – 4:05
3. "No Airplay" – 3:42
4. "Gone till November" (The Makin' Runs remix instrumental) – 3:42

== Charts ==
=== Weekly charts ===
Chart (1997–1998)	Peak position
Australia (ARIA)	88
Canada (Nielsen SoundScan)	4
Canada Dance (RPM)	18
Canada Urban (RPM)	2
Europe (Eurochart Hot 100)	15
Germany (GfK)	31
Ireland (IRMA)	5
Netherlands (Dutch Top 40)	17
Netherlands (Single Top 100)	15
New Zealand (Recorded Music NZ)	4
Scottish Singles Sales (Official Charts)	8
Sweden (Sverigetopplistan)	47
Switzerland (Schweizer Hitparade)	22
UK Singles (Official Charts)	3
UK Hip Hop/R&B (Official Charts)	1
US Billboard Hot 100	7
US Dance Singles Sales (Billboard)	1
US Hot R&B/Hip-Hop Songs (Billboard)	9
US Hot Rap Songs (Billboard)	2
US Rhythmic Airplay (Billboard)	19

=== Year-end charts ===
Chart (1998)	Position
Canada Urban (RPM)	26
New Zealand (RIANZ)	48
UK Singles (OCC)	81
US Billboard Hot 100	33
US Hot R&B Singles (Billboard)	25
US Hot Rap Singles (Billboard)	2
US Maxi-Singles Sales (Billboard)	48
US Rhythmic Top 40 (Billboard)	58

== Certifications ==
Region	Certification	Certified units/sales
New Zealand (RMNZ)	Gold	5,000^{*}
United Kingdom (BPI)	Silver	200,000^{^}
United States (RIAA)	Platinum	1,200,000
^{*} Sales figures based on certification alone.^{^} Shipments figures based on certification alone.

== Release history ==
Region	Date	Format(s)	Label(s)	Ref.
United States	25 November 1997	Contemporary hit; rhythmic contemporary; urban radio	Columbia; Ruffhouse	
United States	20 January 1998	CD; cassette	Columbia; Ruffhouse	
United Kingdom	4 May 1998	CD; cassette	Columbia; Ruffhouse	
