= To All the Girls =

To All the Girls may refer to:

== Albums ==
- To All the Girls... (album), 2013 album by Willie Nelson
- To All the Girls (Verse Simmonds album)

== Songs ==
- "To All the Girls" (Beastie Boys song), 1989 song by the Beastie Boys off the album Paul's Boutique
- "Cheated (To All the Girls)" (Wyclef Jean song), a 1998 single by Wyclef Jean off the album The Carnival
- "To All the Girls" (Aaron Carter song), a 2002 song by Aaron Carter off the album Another Earthquake!

== See also ==
- "To All the Girls I've Loved Before" (song)
- "To All the Girls I've Loved Before" (episode), 1988 TV episode of the U.S. sitcom Cheers; see List of Cheers episodes
