= Gunpowder (song) =

Single by Wyclef Jean featuring Lauryn Hill

from the album Wyclef Jean Presents The Carnival
- Released: September 28, 1998
- Recorded: 1997
- Genre: Reggae fusion; soul
- Length: 3:35
- Label: Ruffhouse; Columbia
- Songwriter: Nelust Jean
- Producers: Jerry 'Wonder' Duplessis; Wyclef Jean

Wyclef Jean singles chronology
"Cheated (To All The Girls)" (1998)	"Gunpowder" (1998)	"Another One Bites the Dust" (1998)

"Gunpowder" is the fifth and final single released from Wyclef Jean's debut solo album, The Carnival. It featured Lauryn Hill and background vocals from The I Threes (Rita Marley, Judy Mowatt and Marcia Griffiths).

The song was commercially successful in the United States, where it reached number 75 on the Billboard Hot 100 chart. Additionally, it reached number 12 in the Hot Rap Songs chart and number 56 in the Hot R&B/Hip-Hop Songs. The single was backed with a remix of album track "No Airplay".

== Track listing ==
German CD1

1. "Gunpowder"
2. "No Airplay - Men In Blue"

German CD2

1. "Gunpowder"
2. "No Airplay - Men In Blue"
3. "No Airplay - Men In Blue" (Instrumental)
4. "Bubblegoose" (Bakin' Cake Mix)

== Chart performance ==
Gunpowder peaked at number 75 on the US Billboard Hot 100 chart. It also peaked at number 56 on the Hot R&B/Hip-Hop Songs and number 12 on the Hot Rap Songs charts. The single was the second of Jean's singles not to be released in the UK.

== Charts ==
=== Weekly charts ===
Chart (1998)	Peak position
US Billboard Hot 100	75
US Hot R&B/Hip-Hop Songs (Billboard)	56
US Hot Rap Songs	12
