= Héctor Angulo =

Cuban composer

Héctor Angulo (Santa Clara, Cuba, 1932 – 2018) was a Cuban composer who combined in his works the result of deep studies about Afro-Cuban folklore and the most modern techniques of musical composition.

== Academic background ==
Héctor Angulo began his musical studies in Santa Clara and concluded in Havana, where he was instructed by professors Zenaida Romeu, Serafín Pró and Julián Orbón. Angulo studied Architecture during four years at the University of Havana. In 1959 he attended a summer course in Tanglewood, United States, and at a later time, during that same year, he received a grant to study at the Manhattan School of Music in New York, where he stayed for the next three years. Angulo returned to Cuba in 1964, where he continued his music composition studies with Leo Brouwer. While studying in the United States, Hector Angulo informed the famous American folk-singer Pete Seeger about a famous Cuban song called Guajira Guantanamera; referring to a version composed by his previous professor Julián Orbón, which utilized the poem of José Martí as its lyrics. That way, Angulo played an important role in the worldwide diffusion of that popular song. About this subject the Cuban double-bassist and musicographer Antonio Gómez Sotolongo says: "In 1961, the improvised verses ("décimas") on the "Guajira Guantanamera" were not still in fashion; but the young Cuban musician Héctor Angulo (Santa Clara, September 3, 1932), who was studying in the United States and was a music professor, used to sing the poems of José Martí as he had heard from his professor Julián Orbón. According to the American folklorist Pete Seeger, he knew about that song from the students that were also Angulo's disciples, and was from Héctor himself that he learned to sing it."

== Professional activities ==
Héctor Angulo began to compose during the mid-forties decade of the 20th Century, and his first pieces were premiered during the fifties decade. Upon his return to Cuba after studying in the United States, Angulo became immersed in the activity of the musical avant-garde of the sixties, and his Works "Trío" for flute, violin and piano from 1965, and his "Sonata for eleven instruments" from 1967 represented a contribution to the Cuban modern music at that time, due to the utilization of "series" and "aleatoric" techniques. In his work it is possible to notice a constant search for a "Cuban style" and an important influence of the works of Roldán and Caturla; about which he himself commented: " I am a follower of the aesthetics of Alejandro García Caturla considering the fact that his work is based on the presence of Cuban elements in the aspects of timbre, rhythm, melody and form […]" We can find a sign of his prominent interest for the Cuban folklore, and especially the Afr-Cuban folklore in his "Tríptico de Cantos Afrocubanos", based on the transcription of 250 melodies by the folklorist Rogelio Martínez Furé; as well as in other compositions, such as his "CInco poemas africanos, and his "Cantos Yorubá de Cuba", for solo guitar. In this same fashion we can mention the chamber opera Ibeyi Añá, based on the story called "Se cierran y se abren los caminos de Cuba", gathered by Lydia Cabrera in her "Cuban black stories". Héctor Angulo also worked as adviser at the Cuban "National Puppet Theater".

== Works ==
Orchestra

- Variaciones, 1967, cuerdas
- Mirandolina, 1975, pequeña orquesta
- A los estudiantes del 71, 1976, guitarra y orquesta
- Tres cantos, 1981, textos: Miguel Barnet, Héctor Angulo y Gerardo Fulleda, voz grave y orquesta
- La llama, 1984, texto: Manuel Navarro Luna, voz media, orquesta de cuerdas, piano y percusión
- El himno unánime, 1992, textos: José Martí y Nicolás Guillén, cantata, para soprano, coro masculino y orquesta
- Somos la misma tierra, 1993, barítono y orquesta de cuerdas
- Ecos, 1996, orquesta de cuerdas.
- Música de cámara
- Cuarteto, 1964, para arcos
- Sobre un canto a Changó, para dos pianos, Sexteto, para metales, y Trío, flauta, violín y piano, 1965
- Preludio y rumba, 1966, para clarinete y piano
- Sonata, 1967, para dos flautas, oboe, trompeta, piano, tímpani, dos violines, viola, cello y contrabajo
- Poema, 1970, para flauta, fagot, violín, cello y piano
- Climas, 1972, para violín, cello y piano
- Del Gran zoo, 1974, texto: Nicolás Guillén, para flauta y guitarra, con recitante opcional
- Cuarteto núm. 2, 1976, para guitarra, violín, viola y cello
- Punto y tonada, 1978, para flauta y piano
- Toque (homenaje a Amadeo Roldán), 1980, para piano y diez percusionistas
- Bucólica, 1984, para saxofón soprano y banda magnetofónica
- Música para un títere, para violín, cello y piano
- Fantasía sobre un cuento ruso, para flautín, violín, cello y piano
- Evocación de Villa-Lobos, para cello y arpa, 1986
- Preludio para una flor, 1988, para guitarra y piano
- Ramo, para guitarra y piano
- Tema final para Ernesto (TV), 1989
- Versión de contradanzas de Saumell, para violín y piano
- Sonera, para violín y piano, 1993
- Canto a la amistad, 1993-1994, para piano y quinteto de viento
- Canciones infantiles, 1994, para cello y piano
- Transcripciones de cuatro sones de París de Carlo Borbolla, 1995, violín y piano.

Choir

- Despedida, texto: Federico García Lorca, para coro mixto a capella
- Cortaron tres árboles, texto: Federico García Lorca, para coro mixto a capella, 1963
- Tres canciones sin texto, 1964, para coro infantil y piano
- Sin un beso no puede ser, texto: Nicolás Guillén, para coro mixto a capella,
- Esta es tu tierra, texto: Pablo Armando Fernández, para coro mixto a capella, 1980
- Mistrales, 1981, texto: Gabriela Mistral, para coro femenino y arpa
- En los álamos del monte, 1986, texto: José Martí, para coro mixto a capella
- La lágrima de amor, 1987, texto: José Jacinto Milanés, para coro mixto a capella
- Poemas de Milanés, 1989, texto: José Jacinto Milanés, para coro femenino y piano
- Vino usted de tan lejos, 1992, texto: Nicolás Guillén, para coro mixto a capella
- Palma sola, 1992, texto: Nicolás Guillén, para coro mixto a capella.

Piano

- Piezas sencillas, 1954
- Sonatina, 1957
- Contradanza, 1959
- Estudio para una épica, 1977
- Evocaciones, 1978
- Estudios, I y II, 1983
- Zapateo cubano, 1984
- Estudios, III y IV, 1988.

Guitar

- Punteado, 1956
- Son y décima, 1964
- Cantos Yorubá de Cuba
- Elogio a Calvert Casey, 1970
- Cantos para ir juntos, 1972
- Sonera (homenaje al bongó), 1976, parados guitarras
- Puntos cubanos, 1984
- Para Roberto y Clara, 1990, para dos guitarras
- Titiritera, 1996.

Accompanied voice

- Un son para niños antillanos, texto: Nicolás Guillén, para voz aguda y piano, y Palma sola, texto: Nicolás Guillén 1962
- A Cucalambé, 1963, texto: Juan Cristóbal Nápoles Fajardo
- Ibeyi Añá, 1968, texto: Camejo-Rogelio Martínez Furé, para tenor y conjunto de cámara con folklore (coro); Poemas africanos, texto: Anónimo africano, para voz aguda y piano, y Cantos afrocubanos, sobre cantos folklóricos en lengua yorubá, para voz media y piano, 1969
- La batalla del mundo, texto: José Martí, para voz grave, flauta, violín, cello y piano, Y te busqué, texto: José Martí, para voz aguda y piano, y Sé de un pintor, texto: José Martí, para voz aguda y piano, 1973
- Homenaje a Salvador Allende, 1976, texto: Pablo Neruda, para recitante y piano que toca percusión
- Poema con niños, texto: Nicolás Guillén, recitante, para flauta, oboe, clarinete, fagot, corno y piano, y Las tierras heridas, texto: Agostinho Neto, para recitante y piano,1977
- La estrella y la paloma, 1978, texto: José Martí, para recitante, flauta, guitarra, cello y percusión
- Sinfín, 1980, texto: Mirta Aguirre, para voz aguda y piano
- Tres cantos, textos: Miguel Barnet, Héctor Angulo y Gerardo Fulleda, para voz grave y piano, Así se hace la historia, texto: Pablo Armando Fernández, para barítono, flauta, trompeta, cello, piano y arpa, y Jesús, ópera en un acto, voces solistas y coro con piano (provisionalmente), 1981
- Mistrales, para voz aguda y piano, y La llama, texto: Manuel Navarro Luna, voz media y piano, 1984
- Que todos estén, 1985, texto: David Chericián, para voz media y piano
- Los álamos del monte, 1986, texto: José Martí, para voz media y piano
- La lágrima de amor, 1987, texto: José Jacinto Milanés, voz media y piano
- Veintidós pregones para el filme Papobo, 1987-1988, texto: Hugo Alea, para voces a capella
- Pregón, 1989, texto: Excilia Saldaña, para voz y piano
- Como la tierra del llano a la montaña, 1995, texto: José Martí, para barítono, quinteto de viento y de cuerdas
- Floripondito o Los títeres son personas, 1996, ópera de cámara, texto: Nicolás Guillén, para voz y piano
- Tirry 81, texto: Carilda Oliver Labra, para voz aguda y piano, y Sonetos, texto: Rafaela Chacón Nardi, para voz aguda y piano, 1997
- Aquellos, 1998, texto: Bertolt Brecht, para voz aguda y piano
- La Aurora, 1999, texto: Federico García Lorca, para flauta, violín y piano, con recitante.

Theatre

- Larga noche de Medea, 1959
- Variaciones para muertos en percusión, 1966
- Las Máscaras, La soga en el cuello, El Sótano, y Pedro y el lobo, Teatro Infantil, 1967
- Otra vez Jehová con el cuento de Sodoma, La Rueda, e Ibeyi Añá, Guiñol Nacional, 1968
- Mutatis mutandi, 1969, El Sótano
- Vladimiro Maiakovski y Una niña busca una canción, 1970
- Programa Yeats, 1971
- Guiso de conejo, Parque Lenin, y El ratón poeta, Guiñol Nacional, 1972
- Viajemos al mundo de los cuentos, 1973
- Los animalitos del bosque y Tingo talango, 1974
- Mirandolina, Rita Montaner, y Coplas americanas, Grupo Teatro Popular Latinoamericano, 1975
- Los profanadores, Rita Montaner, y La lechuza ambiciosa, Guiñol Nacional, 1976
- Caperucita roja, Guiñol Nacional, y Orfeo en carnaval, 1980
- Bebé y el señor don Pomposo y El tigre Pedrín, 1981
- Cucarachita martina, 1982
- Pinocho y Mascarada, 1984
- El caballito jorobadito, 1986
- En tiempos de ña seré, 1987
- Para subir al cielo se necesita, 1988
- El sol es nuestro y Variedades de Guiñol, 1989
- Un sitio bajo el sol, 1990
- El que sigue la consigue, 1991
- Floripondito o Los títeres son personas, 1996
- La lechuza canta de noche, 1996, Guiñol Nacional.

== See also ==
- Music of Cuba
