= Dominic Smith (baseball) =

American baseball player (born 1995)

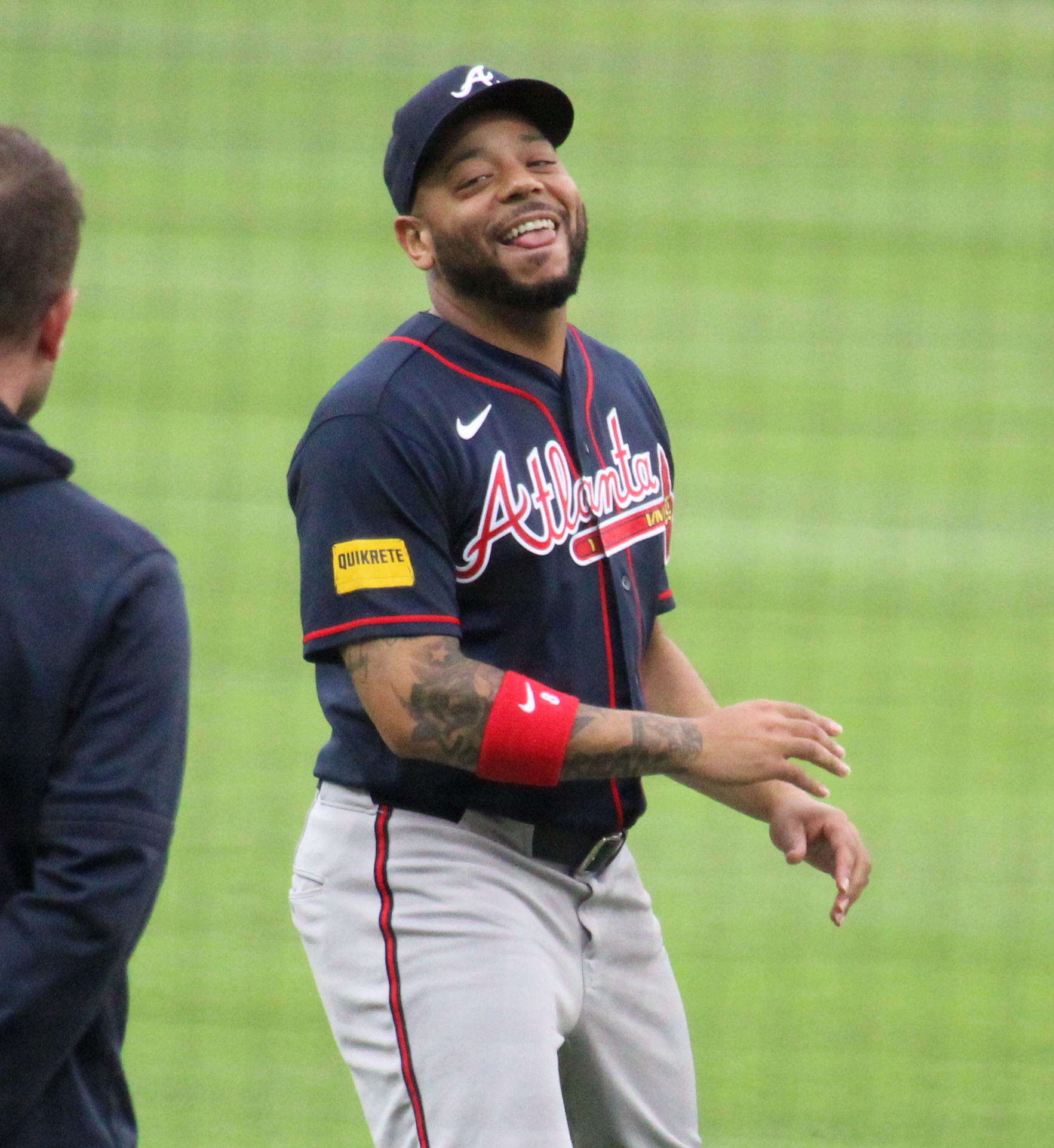
- Smith with the Atlanta Braves in 2026

Free agent
- First baseman / Left fielder
- Born: June 15, 1995 (age 31); Los Angeles, California, U.S.
- Bats: Left Throws: Left

MLB debut
- August 11, 2017, for the New York Mets

MLB statistics (through 2026 season)
- Batting average: .250
- Home runs: 78
- Runs batted in: 338
- Stats at Baseball Reference

Teams
- New York Mets (2017–2022); Washington Nationals (2023); Boston Red Sox (2024); Cincinnati Reds (2024); San Francisco Giants (2025); Atlanta Braves (2026)

Dominic David Rene Smith (born June 15, 1995), is an American professional baseball first baseman and left fielder who is a free agent. He has played in Major League Baseball (MLB) for the New York Mets, Washington Nationals, Boston Red Sox, Cincinnati Reds, San Francisco Giants, and Atlanta Braves. He was selected by the Mets with the 11th overall pick of the 2013 MLB draft, and made his MLB debut in 2017.

== Early life ==
Smith participated in Reviving Baseball in Inner Cities and the Major League Baseball Urban Youth Academy in his youth. He attended Junípero Serra High School in Gardena, California, and played for the school's baseball team as a first baseman, outfielder, and pitcher. He led the Cavaliers to the California Interscholastic Federation Southern Section division championship in 2013.

Smith committed to attend the University of Southern California (USC).

== Professional career ==
=== New York Mets ===
==== Minor leagues ====
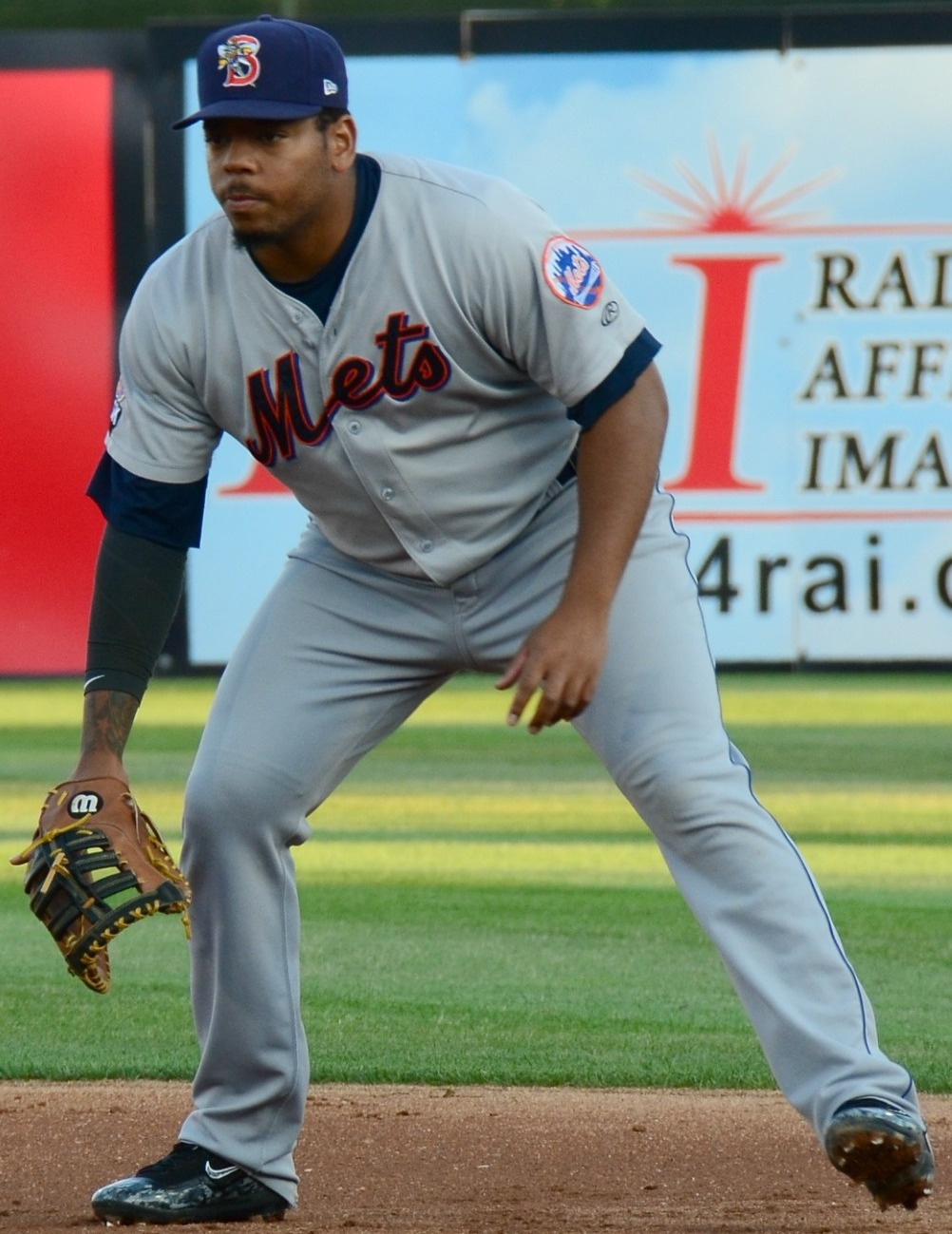
Smith with the Binghamton Mets in 2016

The Mets selected Smith in the first round, with the eleventh overall selection, of the 2013 Major League Baseball draft. Rather than attend USC, he signed with the Mets for a $2.6 million signing bonus. The Mets assigned Smith to the Gulf Coast Mets of the rookie–level Gulf Coast League (GCL), where he batted .287 with three home runs and 22 runs batted in (RBIs) in 48 games. He was subsequently promoted to the Kingsport Mets of the rookie-level Appalachian League, where he recorded four doubles in six at bats. At season's end, Baseball America named Smith as the 4th best prospect in the GCL for 2013. He spent the entire 2014 season with the Savannah Sand Gnats of the Single–A South Atlantic League. With just one home run, 44 RBIs and 77 strikeouts in 461 at bats, Smith fell way short of expectations.

Smith got off to a slow start with the St. Lucie Mets of the High–A Florida State League (FSL) in 2015. He batted .143 with one double in his first sixteen games, and was 0-for-22 to start May. On May 12, Smith got his first extra base hit since Opening Day with a double against the Tampa Yankees. The 3-for-5 performance signaled a turn around for Smith, who compiled a sixteen-game hitting streak to raise his batting average to .260. For the month of June, Smith batted .352 with a FSL-leading 38 hits and 51 total bases. He also had the second most RBIs (20) and fifth most runs scored (15) to earn FSL Player of the Month honors. The hot hitting continued; Smith ended the season with a .305/.354/.417 slashline, and a career high six home runs. He led the league with 79 RBIs and 33 doubles on his way to being named FSL Player of the Year. After the season, he played for the Salt River Rafters of the Arizona Fall League.

In 2016, Smith played for the Binghamton Mets of the Double–A Eastern League, where he posted a .302 batting average with 14 home runs and 91 RBIs. He played in the 2016 All-Star Futures Game. The Mets assigned Smith to the Las Vegas 51s of the Triple–A Pacific Coast League to start the 2017 season.

==== 2017–2019 ====
The Mets promoted Smith to the major leagues on August 11, 2017, after Fernando Salas was designated for assignment. He made his debut that night against the Philadelphia Phillies at Citizens Bank Park, recording a single for his first hit, off of Nick Pivetta. Smith hit his first home run off of Sonny Gray on August 15. He ended the 2017 season with a .198 batting average and nine home runs in 167 at bats for the Mets.

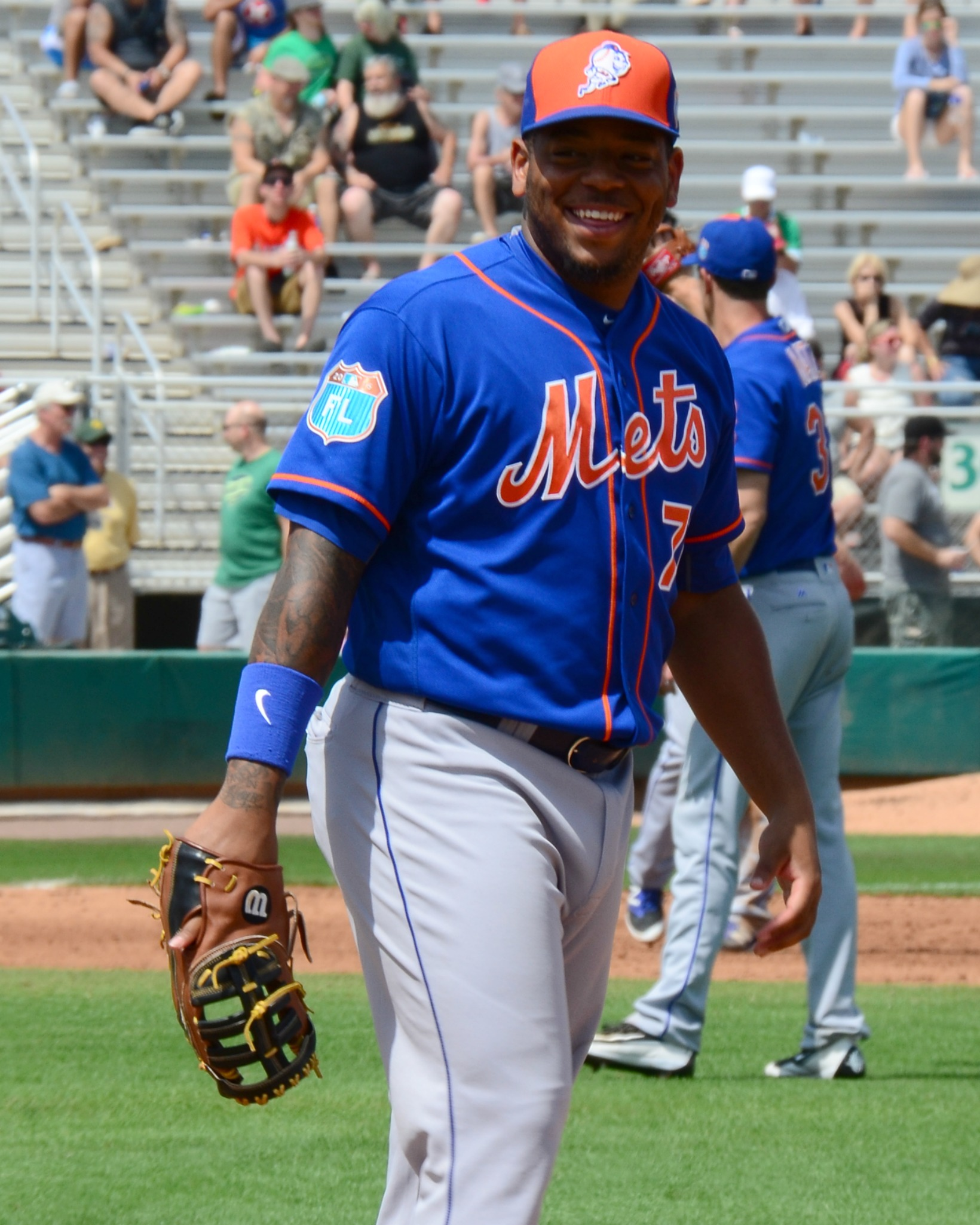
Smith with the New York Mets at spring training in 2016

In spring training in 2018, Smith was set to compete with Adrián González to be the Mets' starting first baseman, but he missed most of spring training due to a quadriceps injury. He began the season in Las Vegas, and was promoted on May 11 when Jay Bruce went on the paternity list, and demoted when Bruce returned on May 14. Smith was promoted again on June 11 when the Mets released Adrián González. Smith was demoted again on July 20 after Yoenis Céspedes was activated from the disabled list. In 2018 with the Mets he batted .224/.255/.420 in 143 at bats.

During spring training in 2019, Smith resumed using a continuous positive airway pressure (CPAP) machine. Smith had been diagnosed with sleep apnea in 2016 when, during a sleep study, he stopped breathing 90 times per hour—a doctor told him that 30 breathing stoppages per hour would have been considered a severe case. He and Mets general manager Brodie Van Wagenen credited the CPAP machine treatment with making him more alert and productive on the field that spring.

Smith made the opening day roster and split time between first base and left field in what was described as a "breakout season." In late July, he was placed on the injured list (IL) with a stress fracture in his left foot. On September 29, Smith returned from the IL in the last game of the Mets regular season. In his first at-bat back, he hit a three-run walk-off home run off Grant Dayton with the Mets down by two runs, leading the team to a 7–6 win in the bottom of the 11th inning over the Atlanta Braves.

==== 2020 ====
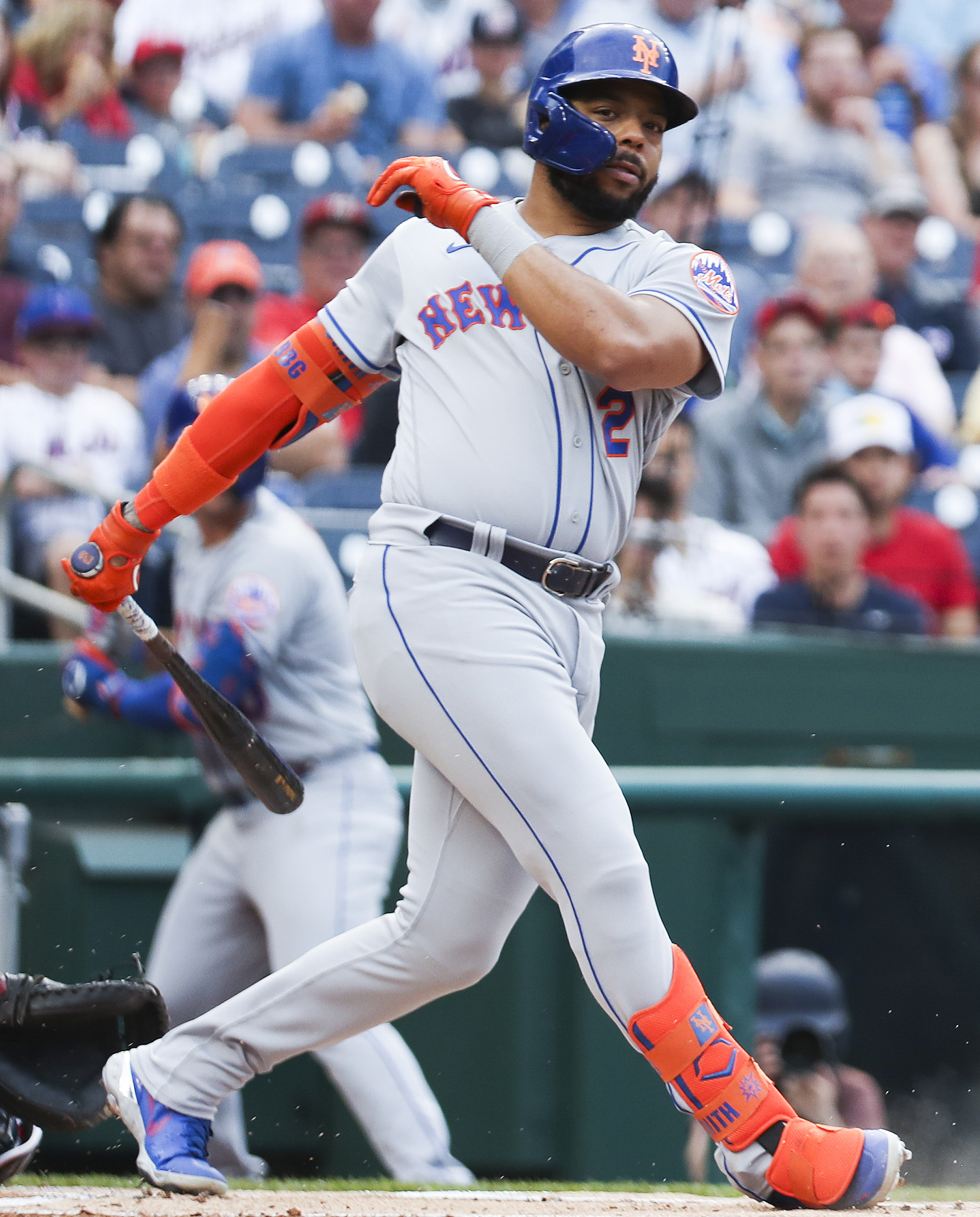
Smith batting for the Mets in 2021

In the 2020 season, Smith received more playing time following Yoenis Cespedes' decision to opt out of the shortened season due to COVID-19-related concerns. For the second year in a row, he enjoyed what was described as a "breakout season." He played in 50 of the team's 60 games batting .316/.377/.616 for the Mets with 21 doubles, 10 home runs and 42 RBIs in only 177 ABs. His .616 slugging percentage set a franchise record, albeit in a shortened season.

Following the 2020 season, Smith was named one of the finalists for the Hank Aaron Award after registering an on-base plus slugging (OPS) of .993, tied for fourth in the National League. Smith finished thirteenth in National League MVP Award voting. Writing for ESPN.com, Sam Miller named Smith the 25th-most entertaining player in baseball, describing him as "one of the most engaging people in the sport."

==== 2021 ====
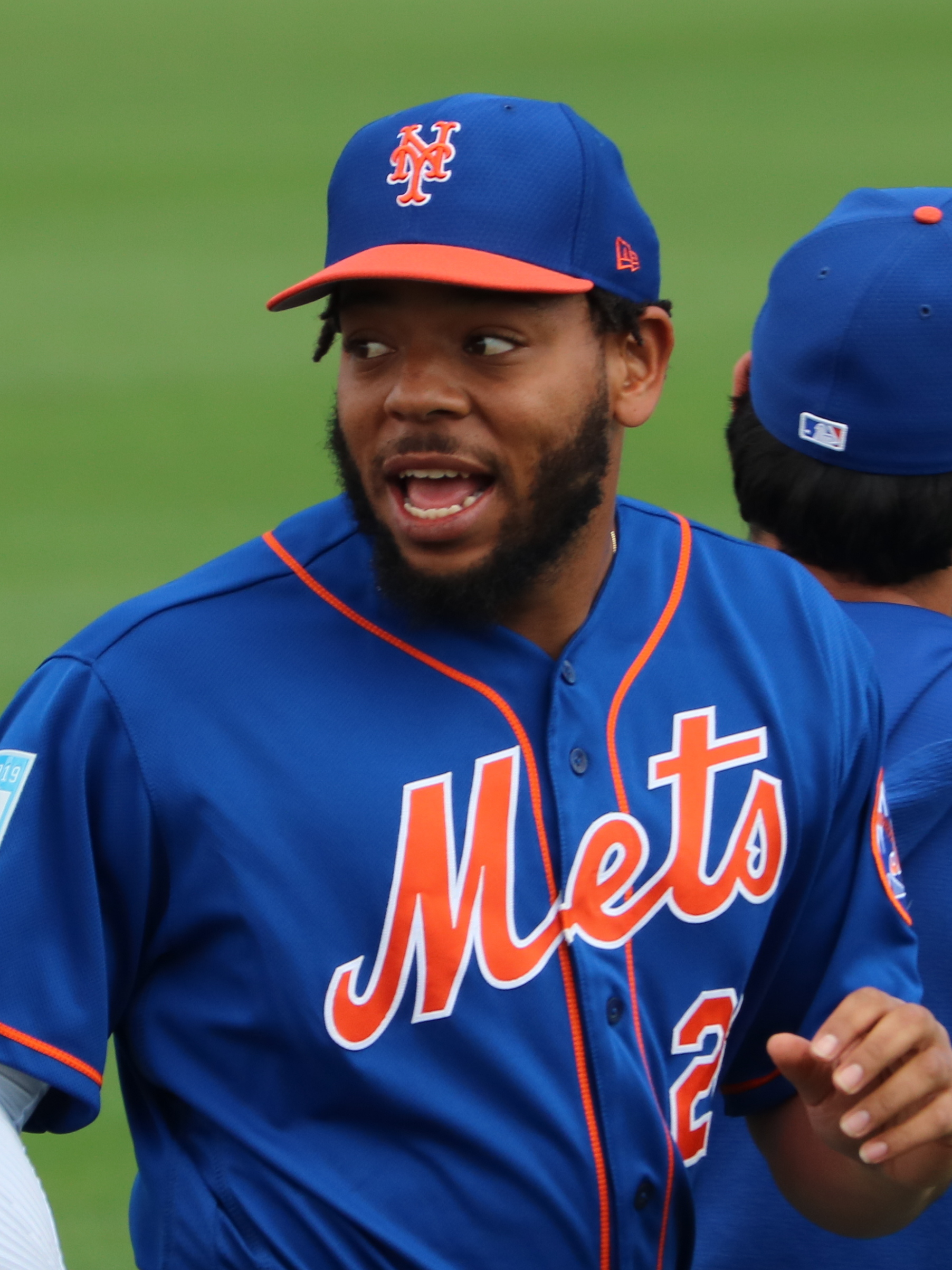
Smith with the Mets in 2019

In 2021, Smith batted .244/.304/.363 with 11 home runs and 48 RBIs in 145 games, while playing primarily left field, and set a season high with 112 strikeouts, against 32 walks.. His 2021 season was universally considered a disappointing setback. A Sports Illustrated article on the season's biggest disappointments called him "the team's least valuable player in 2021." An article on FanSided described him as looking "like a shell of the player" he was in 2020. An ESPN.com article described Smith and teammate Jeff McNeil as "prime under-performers". Greg Joyce wrote in the New York Post that "Smith’s regression in 2021 clouded his future and role" with the Mets.

In March 2022, Smith told reporters that he had suffered a partially torn labrum in late May or early June 2021 but had played through the injury, which affected his swing.

==== 2022 ====
During the 2021–22 offseason, the Mets signed Mark Canha and Starling Marte to play the corner outfield positions and Pete Alonso was again slated to be the everyday first baseman. Smith reportedly was unhappy with his anticipated loss of playing time and the Mets discussed a trade to the San Diego Padres which ultimately fell through before the season began.

Smith was not in the starting lineup on opening day, with the designated hitter role being assigned to J. D. Davis. In the team's first 50 games over the first two months of the season, Smith only started 22.

At the beginning of May when active rosters were reduced in size, Smith was among the candidates for release or demotion, at which point he was batting .167 with a .490 OPS. On May 1, 2022, however, Smith went 4-for-4 with a double and three runs batted in. The following day, the Mets made the decision to designate Robinson Canó for assignment and retain Smith on the active roster.

On May 19, 2022, Smith was batting .203 with a .552 OPS when he told Newsday that he wanted to play every day either for the Mets or for "another team out there." Less than two weeks later, on May 31, the Mets announced that Smith was being demoted to Triple-A Syracuse in favor of reliever Adonis Medina. His batting average had fallen to .186 and his OPS to .543.

Smith returned from his stint in Syracuse in late June in what he felt was a better headspace. However, his performance did not improve. After spraining his ankle in mid-July, he was placed on the injured list. The Mets acquired first baseman Daniel Vogelbach and outfielder Tyler Naquin shortly thereafter with the expectation that they would absorb much of the playing time which otherwise would have gone to Smith. During his time on the injured list, the Mets also traded for Darin Ruf to back up Pete Alonso at first base. On August 11, the Mets reinstated Smith from the injured list but optioned him to Triple-A.

Smith said in August that he did not know whether the Mets would want to bring him back, given how poorly he had been performing in 2022. In 2022 with the Mets, he batted .194/.276/.284 with zero home runs in 134 at bats.

On November 18, 2022, the Mets declined to offer Smith a contract and he became a free agent, ending what was described in Newsday as a "tumultuous stay" and on MLB.com as an "uneven tenure" with the Mets.

=== Washington Nationals ===
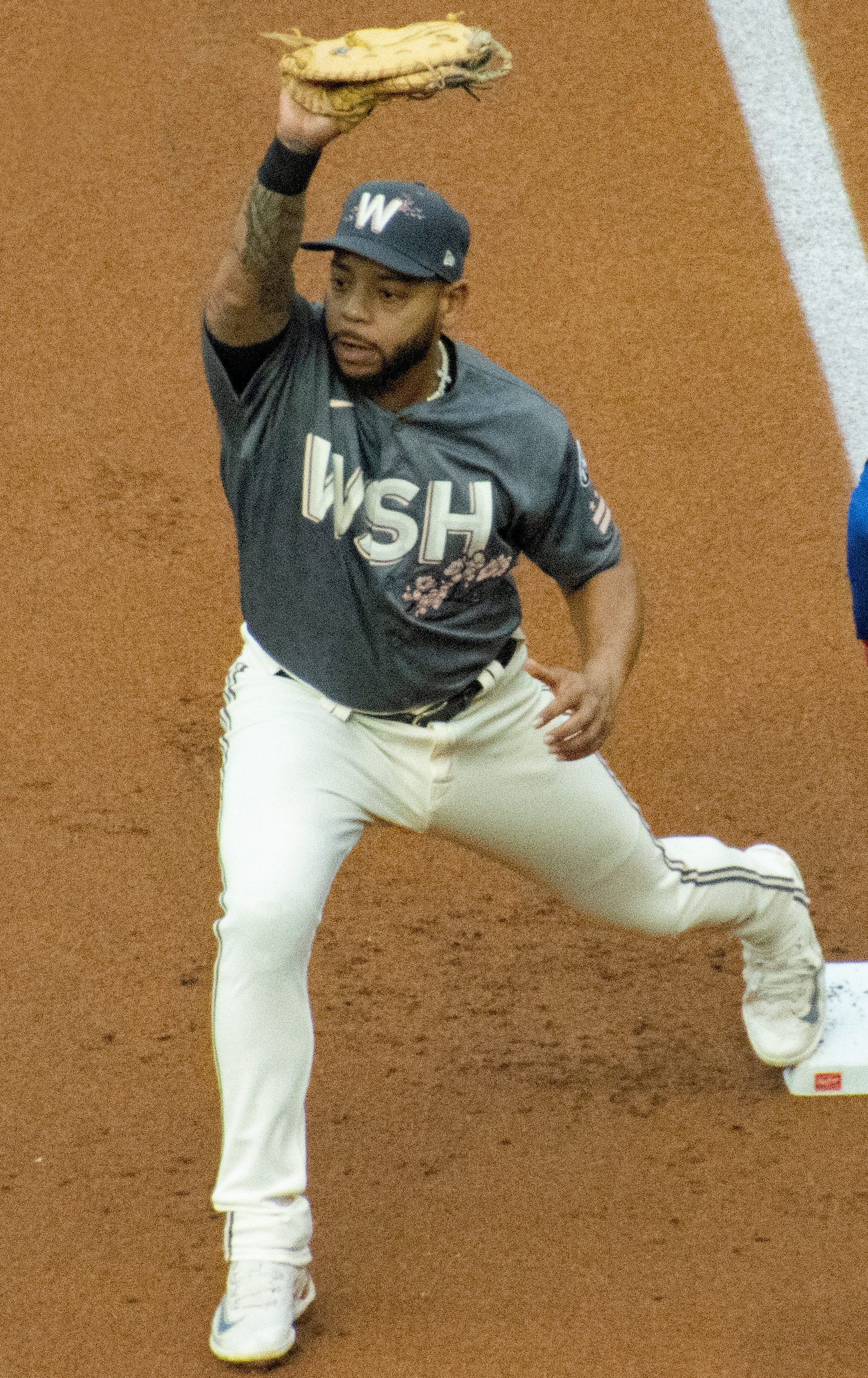
Smith with the Washington Nationals in 2023

On January 4, 2023, Smith signed a one-year, $2 million contract with the Washington Nationals. In a career–high 153 games for Washington, he batted .254/.326/.366 with 12 home runs (a career-high) and 46 RBI. On November 14, Smith was designated for assignment after multiple prospects were added to the 40-man roster. He was non-tendered and became a free agent on November 17.

=== 2024 season ===
On February 19, 2024, Smith signed a minor league contract with the Chicago Cubs. On March 22, Smith was released by the Cubs after triggering the opt–out clause in his contract.

==== Tampa Bay Rays ====
On March 30, 2024, Smith signed a minor league contract with the Tampa Bay Rays. In 21 games for the Triple–A Durham Bulls, he batted .263/.337/.375 with two home runs and 11 RBI. Smith was released by the Rays on May 1 after he triggered the opt–out clause in his contract.

==== Boston Red Sox ====
On May 1, 2024, Smith signed a one–year, major league contract with the Boston Red Sox. In 83 games for Boston, he batted .237/.317/.390 with six home runs and 34 RBI. Smith was designated for assignment by the Red Sox after Triston Casas returned from the injured list on August 16. He was released on August 20.

==== Cincinnati Reds ====
On August 22, 2024, Smith signed a one-year, major league contract with the Cincinnati Reds. In 9 games for Cincinnati, he went 5–for–26 (.192). Smith was designated for assignment by the Reds on September 2. He cleared waivers and was sent outright to the Triple–A Louisville Bats the next day. Smith rejected the assignment in lieu of free agency on September 5.

=== New York Yankees ===
On January 13, 2025, Smith signed a minor league contract with the New York Yankees. On March 21, Smith opted out of his contract after failing to make the Yankees' Opening Day roster. On March 30, he re-signed with the Yankees on a new minor league contract. In 45 appearances for the Triple-A Scranton/Wilkes-Barre RailRiders, Smith batted .255/.333/.448 with eight home runs, 28 RBI, and four stolen bases. On June 1, Smith became a free agent after triggering the opt-out clause in his minor league contract.

=== San Francisco Giants ===
On June 4, 2025, Smith signed a one-year, major league contract with the San Francisco Giants. Smith made 63 appearances for San Francisco, batting .284/.333/.417 with five home runs, 33 RBI, and two stolen bases.

=== Atlanta Braves ===
On February 17, 2026, Smith signed a minor league contract with the Atlanta Braves. On March 21, the Braves signed him to a split major league contract. In his Braves debut on March 28, Smith hit a walk-off grand slam against the Kansas City Royals.

== Personal life ==
Smith's parents, Clay Smith and Yvette LaFleur, have seven children total. They lived separately while raising Dominic. His mother worked in child care and his father is a dog trainer and groomer. Smith grew up a Los Angeles Angels fan. LaFleur died of cancer on March 15, 2026.

In 2017, Smith founded a non-profit, Baseball Generations, which supports player development for financially underprivileged players.
