= Justin Crawford (baseball) =

American baseball player (born 2004)

Philadelphia Phillies – No. 2
- Outfielder
- Born: January 13, 2004 (age 22); Phoenix, Arizona, U.S.
- Bats: Left Throws: Right

MLB debut
- March 26, 2026, for the Philadelphia Phillies

MLB statistics (through 2026 season)
- Batting average: .264
- Home runs: 3
- Runs batted in: 41
- Stats at Baseball Reference

Teams
- Philadelphia Phillies (2026–present)
Medals
Men's baseball
Representing United States
WBSC Premier12
Bronze medal – third place	2024 Tokyo	Team

Justin Carl Crawford (born January 13, 2004) is an American professional baseball outfielder for the Philadelphia Phillies of Major League Baseball (MLB). He made his MLB debut in 2026.

== Amateur career ==
Crawford spent his freshman year of high school at Rolling Hills Preparatory School in Torrance, California before transferring to Bishop Gorman High School in Las Vegas as a sophomore. As a junior, he batted .525. In 2022, as a senior, he batted .503 with five home runs, 52 RBIs, and 20 stolen bases. The Las Vegas Sun named him their Male Athlete of the Year. He was a top prospect for the upcoming Major League Baseball draft. Crawford committed to play college baseball at the University of Arizona in May 2020 but switched his commitment to Louisiana State University.

== Professional career ==
=== Draft and minor leagues (2022–2025) ===
The Philadelphia Phillies selected Crawford in the first round with the 17th overall selection of the 2022 Major League Baseball draft. He signed with the team for $3.89 million on July 25. In August, Crawford played 11 games with the Florida Complex League Phillies before being promoted to the Single-A Clearwater Threshers, where he played five more games. In limited action in his first professional season, Crawford hit .241 with one triple as his only extra-base hit and 10 stolen bases.

To open the 2023 season, Crawford was assigned to Clearwater. He was selected to the 2023 All-Star Futures Game. In mid-August, he was promoted to the High-A Jersey Shore BlueClaws. In 87 games with the two teams, he batted .332 with three home runs, 64 RBI, and 47 stolen bases. He won the Florida State League Most Valuable Player Award and Top MLB Prospect Award for his performance with Clearwater.

Crawford started the 2024 season returning to the BlueClaws. He was promoted to the Double-A Reading Fightin Phils in July. Crawford again was picked to play in the All-Star Futures Game, where he singled and made a highlight diving catch. Over 110 games with the BlueClaws and Fightin Phils, he had a .313/.360/.444 slash line with nine home runs, 61 RBI, and 42 stolen bases. Crawford was assigned to the Triple-A Lehigh Valley IronPigs for the 2025 season. Over 112 games, he batted .334 with seven home runs, 47 RBI, and 46 stolen bases.

=== Philadelphia Phillies (2026–present) ===
Crawford was a non-roster invitee to 2026 spring training and hit .250 with three doubles and a triple across 55 at-bats. On March 25, 2026, the Phillies selected Crawford's contract after he made the team's Opening Day roster. He made his MLB debut on March 26 as Phillies' starting center fielder versus the Texas Rangers at Citizens Bank Park. He recorded his first MLB hit, a single, on the first pitch he saw in his first MLB at-bat, off Rangers starting pitcher Nathan Eovaldi. On April 1, 2026, versus the Washington Nationals at Citizens Bank Park, Crawford recorded his first career extra base hit in the fourth inning with an opposite field double. Then, in the bottom of the 10th inning, he had his first career RBI and his first career walk-off hit to secure the win and the homestand for the Phillies. Crawford hit his first MLB home run, a two-run home run off Colorado Rockies reliever Jimmy Herget, on May 8. In 2026, he played in a total of 149 games for the Phillies and ended the season with a .264/309/.353 slash line with three home runs, 41 RBI, and 17 stolen bases.

== International career ==
Crawford played for the United States national baseball team in the 2024 WBSC Premier12 tournament. Crawford started all nine games in center field, batting .250 with one home run as U.S. took the bronze medal. He said it was his dream to play for his country.

== Personal life ==
Crawford's father, Carl Crawford, played 15 seasons of Major League Baseball. His second cousin, J.P. Crawford, also a Phillies first-round pick, currently plays for the Seattle Mariners.
