= Guantanamera =

Cuban folk song

- First known release by Conjunto Caney in 1938

Song
- Language: Spanish
- Released: 1929
- Genre: Guajira-son
- Composer: Joseíto Fernández

"Guantanamera" (pronounced [ɡwantanaˈmeɾa]; Spanish for 'The woman from Guantánamo') is a Cuban patriotic song with lyrics from a poem by the Cuban poet José Martí. It is an expression of love for Cuba and of solidarity with the poor people of the world.

The official writing credits have been given to Joseíto Fernández, who first popularized the song on radio as early as 1929 (although it is unclear when the first release as a record occurred). In 1966, a version by American vocal group the Sandpipers, based on an arrangement by the Weavers from their May 1963 Carnegie Hall Reunion concert, became an international hit. The song has notably been covered or interpreted by Celia Cruz, Compay Segundo and Wyclef Jean.

== Music ==
The music for the song is sometimes also attributed to Joseíto Fernández, who claimed to have written it at various dates (consensus puts 1929 as its year of origin), and who used it regularly in one of his radio programs. Some claim that the song's structure actually came from Herminio "El Diablo" García Wilson, who could be credited as a co-composer. García's heirs took the matter to court decades later, but lost the case; the People's Supreme Court of Cuba credited Fernández as the sole composer of the music in 1993. Regardless of either claim, Fernández can safely be claimed as being the first to promote the song widely through his radio programs.

== Pete Seeger version ==
Shortly after the Weavers' Carnegie Hall reunion concert recording in May 1963, Pete Seeger included the song on his album We Shall Overcome, which was also performed live at Carnegie Hall. Seeger's recording is described by Stewart Mason at AllMusic as the "definitive version" of the song.

The version of the song created by Martí and Julián Orbón was used by Seeger as the basis of his reworked version, which he based on a performance of the song by Héctor Angulo. Seeger combined Martí's verse with the tune, with the intention that it be used by the peace movement at the time of the Cuban Missile Crisis. He urged that people sing the song as a symbol of unity between the American and Cuban peoples, and called for it to be sung in Spanish to "hasten the day [that] the USA ... is some sort of bilingual country."

== The Sandpipers version ==
"Guantanamera"

Single by the Sandpipers
- B-side: "What Makes You Dream, Pretty Girl?"
- Released: July 1966
- Genre: Pop, easy listening, Latin, folk
- Length: 3:10
- Label: A&M
- Songwriters: Héctor Angulo, José Martí, Pete Seeger
- Producer: Tommy LiPuma

The Sandpipers singles chronology
"Everything in the Garden" (1966)	"Guantanamera" (1966)	"Louie Louie" (1966)

The most commercially successful version of "Guantanamera" in the English-speaking world was recorded by the easy listening vocal group the Sandpipers in 1966. Their recording was based on the Weavers' 1963 Carnegie Hall reunion concert rendition and was arranged by Mort Garson and produced by Tommy LiPuma. In addition to the group's vocals, the version includes Robie Lester on background vocals and narration by producer LiPuma. It reached No. 9 on the Billboard Hot 100 and No. 7 on the UK singles chart.

=== Charts ===
Chart (1966)	Peak position
Canadian RPM Top Tracks	10
Ireland (IRMA)	3
Netherlands (Single Top 100)	3
New Zealand (Listener)	7
South Africa (Springbok Radio)	2
UK Singles (Official Charts)	7
US Billboard Hot 100	9
US Adult Contemporary (Billboard)	3
West Germany (GfK)	22

== Celia Cruz version ==
"Guantanamera" is one of the songs most commonly identified with Cuban singer Celia Cruz (1925–2003). It appears on at least 241 different records or compilations of hers, her earliest commercial recording of it being on the Mexican label Tico Records in 1968. She mentions her special memories of singing "Guantanamera" nine times in her posthumous 2004 autobiography.

=== Charts ===
Chart (2010)	Peak position
US Billboard World Digital Songs Sales	2

== Wyclef Jean version ==
"Guantanamera"

Single by Wyclef Jean featuring Lauryn Hill, Celia Cruz, and Jeni Fujita

from the album Wyclef Jean Presents The Carnival
- Released: October 8, 1997
- Recorded: 1997
- Genre: Latin hip-hop; R&B
- Length: 4:30
- Label: Ruffhouse; Columbia
- Songwriters: Nelust Jean; Lauryn Hill; Jerry Duplessis; Pete Seeger; Julián Orbón; Joseíto Fernández; José Martí
- Producer: Wyclef Jean

Wyclef Jean singles chronology
"Anything Can Happen" (1997)	"Guantanamera" (1997)	"No, No, No" (1997)

Wyclef Jean's version of the song is not a cover of the original, but an incorporation with additional lyrics/music. The album version of the song featured singing by Jeni Fujita alongside Celia Cruz (who re-recorded her vocals for the song), with an additional rap verse by Lauryn Hill.

The song was nominated for a Grammy Award for Best Rap Performance by a Duo or Group. The song peaked at number 29 on the Billboard Rhythmic Airplay chart, and peaked within the top 40 in several countries, including the United Kingdom. Former United States President Barack Obama listed the song on his 2022 summer playlist.

=== Charts ===
Chart (1997)	Peak position
Germany (GfK)	29
Netherlands (Dutch Top 40)	28
Netherlands (Single Top 100)	32
New Zealand (Recorded Music NZ)	15
Scottish Singles Sales (Official Charts)	47
Sweden (Sverigetopplistan)	48
Switzerland (Schweizer Hitparade)	19
UK Singles (Official Charts)	25
UK Hip Hop/R&B (Official Charts)	10
US Rhythmic Airplay (Billboard)	29

== Other recordings ==
The song has been recorded by multiple solo artists, including Bárbara y Dick who took the song to no. 1 in Argentina, Demis Roussos, Willy Chirino, Julio Iglesias, Joan Baez, Albita, Jimmy Buffett, Bobby Darin, Raul Malo, Joe Dassin, Muslim Magomayev, José Feliciano, Tony Mottola, Biser Kirov, Puerto Plata, Trini Lopez, La Lupe, Nana Mouskouri, Tito Puente, Raulín Rodríguez, Andy Russell, Gloria Estefan, Phil Manzanera, Robert Wyatt (under the title "Caimanera"), Zucchero Fornaciari, Julie Felix, Ansuman Roy, Freddie McGregor, and by such groups as The Mavericks, Inti-Illimani, Buena Vista Social Club, Los Lobos, Pozo-Seco Singers, Todos Tus Muertos, The Spinners, and the Gipsy Kings.

== In popular culture ==
- The tune of this song is commonly used in British football chant, such as "There's only one [insert player/manager name]". For example, it was used for Paul Gascoigne ("There's only one Paul Gascoigne"), but modified for Gary Stevens ("There's only two Gary Stevens") since there were two players of the same name active at the same time. Other chants using the same tune include "You only sing when you're winning", and "You're getting sacked in the morning".
- Captain Morgan Original Spiced Rum's 2019 television commercial campaign also features this chant.
- Pakistani pop star Alamgir recorded an adaptation in the 1980s interspersed with unrelated Urdu lyrics, titled Albela Rahi, which has become an informal signature tune and title for the singer (now based in the United States).
