= La'Ci =

American singer

- La'Ci performing in Brooklyn in October 2026

Background information
- Origin: New York City, U.S.
- Genres: Dembow; baile funk; Neoperreo; Hyperpop
- Occupations: Singer; songwriter
- Years active: 2026–present
- Label: Walk On Water Music Group

La'Ci is an American singer and songwriter from New York City. She records dembow, baile funk, and hyperpop music in English and Spanish.

== Career ==
Of Caribbean Latina descent, La'Ci signed with Walk On Water Music Group (WOW), an independent label founded by music executive Mathew "Vine" Burke. She released her debut single, "Major", on April 20, 2026. In The Source, Shawn Grant wrote that the song pairs reggaeton dembow drums with hyperpop and electronic bass.

Her second single, "Dembow Funk", was released on August 1, 2026. Produced by Yannick Beaudouin-Lortie and co-produced by Burke, the track was written by Gabriella De Gracia, Miguel Andrés de León Alvarez, Burke, and Beaudouin-Lortie, combining Dominican dembow rhythms with Brazilian baile funk. In October 2026, she performed in East Williamsburg, Brooklyn while recording an extended play, The Gringa Files, with Burke and producer Jerry Wonda.

== Discography ==
=== Singles ===
- "Major" (2026)
- "Dembow Funk" (2026)
