= Florida State League Most Valuable Player Award =

- Sport: Baseball
- League: Florida State League
- Awarded for: Best regular season player in the Florida State League
- Country: United States
- Presented by: Florida State League

History
- First award: Brandon Sing (2004)
- Most recent: Echedry Vargas (2026)

The Florida State League Most Valuable Player Award (MVP), known as the Player of the Year Award until 2021, is an annual award given to the best player in minor league baseball's Florida State League.

First basemen, with 7 winners, have won the most among infielders, followed by second basemen and shortstops (1). Three catchers has also won the award. Ten outfielders have won the MVP Award.

Three players from the Bradenton Marauders, Daytona Cubs/Tortugas, Jupiter Hammerheads, St. Lucie Mets, and Tampa Yankees have been selected for the MVP Award, more than any other teams in the league, followed by the Clearwater Threshers and Lakeland Flying Tigers (2); and the Charlotte Stone Crabs, Dunedin Blue Jays, and Fort Myers Miracle (1).

Three players from the Miami Marlins, New York Mets, New York Yankees, and Pittsburgh Pirates Major League Baseball (MLB) organizations have won the MVP Award, more than any others, followed by the Cincinnati Reds, Detroit Tigers, and Philadelphia Phillies organizations (2); and the Chicago Cubs, Minnesota Twins, Tampa Bay Rays, and Toronto Blue Jays organizations (1).

== Key ==
Position	Indicates the player's primary position

== Winners ==
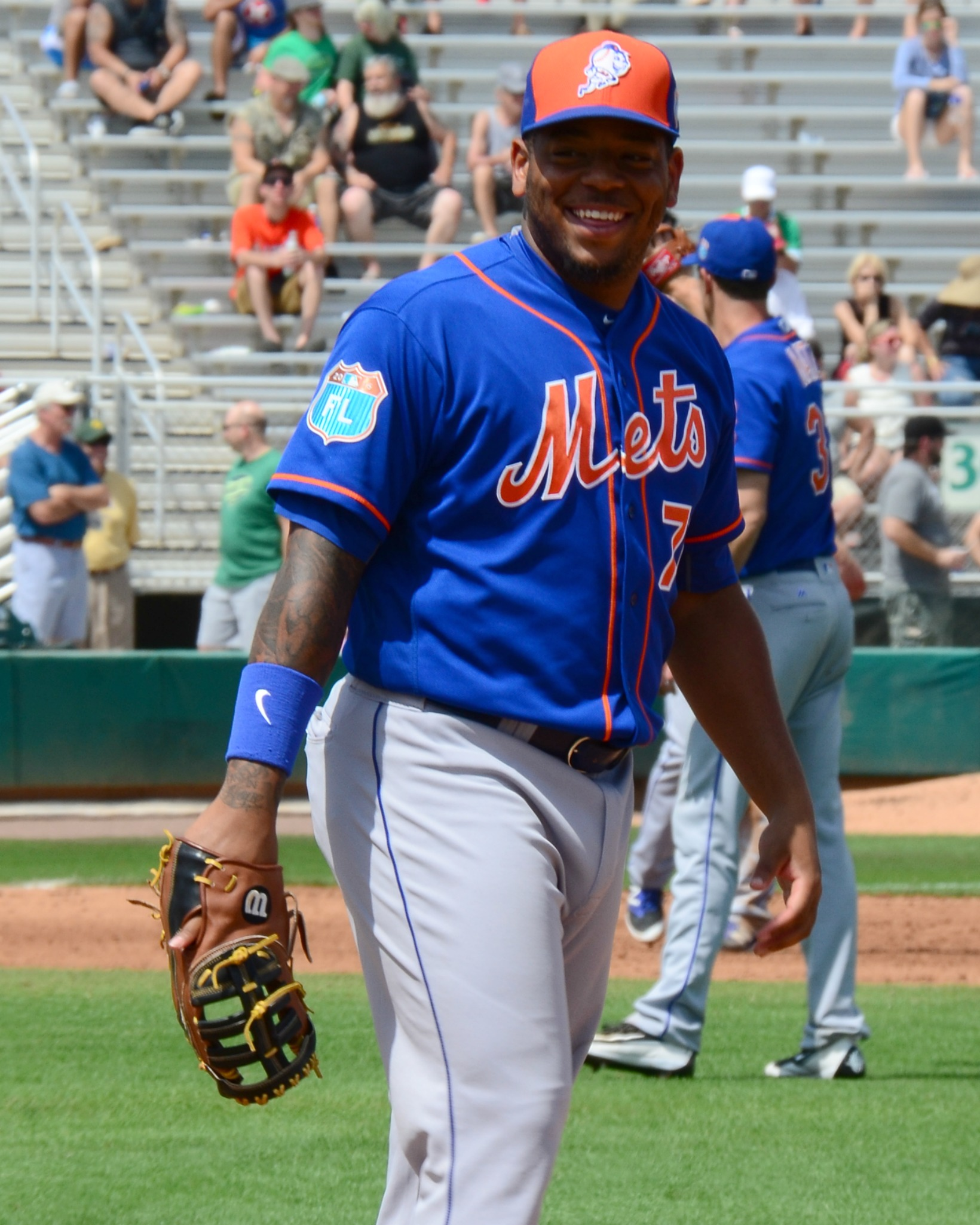
Dominic Smith, 2015 Florida State League Player of the Year

Year	Winner	Team	Organization	Position	Ref(s).
2004	Brandon Sing	Daytona Cubs	Chicago Cubs	First baseman	
2005	Brent Clevlen	Lakeland Tigers	Detroit Tigers	Right fielder	
2006	Cody Ehlers	Tampa Yankees	New York Yankees	First baseman	
2007	Josh Kreuzer	Dunedin Blue Jays	Toronto Blue Jays	First baseman	
2008	Logan Morrison	Jupiter Hammerheads	Florida Marlins	First baseman	
2009	Austin Romine	Tampa Yankees	New York Yankees	Catcher	
2010	Melky Mesa	Tampa Yankees	New York Yankees	Center fielder	
2011	Kyle Jensen	Jupiter Hammerheads	Florida Marlins	Left fielder	
2012	Alex Dickerson	Bradenton Marauders	Pittsburgh Pirates	First baseman	
2013	Dustin Lawley	St. Lucie Mets	New York Mets	Left fielder	
2014	Josh Bell	Bradenton Marauders	Pittsburgh Pirates	Right fielder	
2015	Dominic Smith	St. Lucie Mets	New York Mets	First baseman	
2016	Aristides Aquino	Daytona Tortugas	Cincinnati Reds	Right fielder	
2017	Brandon Lowe	Charlotte Stone Crabs	Tampa Bay Rays	Second baseman	
2018	Jose Pujols	Clearwater Threshers	Philadelphia Phillies	Right fielder	
2019	Trevor Larnach	Fort Myers Miracle	Minnesota Twins	Outfielder	
2020	None selected (season cancelled due to COVID-19 pandemic)				
2021	Endy Rodríguez	Bradenton Marauders	Pittsburgh Pirates	Catcher	
2022	Omar De Los Santos	St. Lucie Mets	New York Mets	Outfielder	
2023	Justin Crawford	Clearwater Threshers	Philadelphia Phillies	Center fielder	
2024	Kevin McGonigle	Lakeland Flying Tigers	Detroit Tigers	Shortstop	
2025	Alfredo Duno	Daytona Tortugas	Cincinnati Reds	Catcher	
2026	Echedry Vargas	Jupiter Hammerheads	Miami Marlins	First baseman	
