= Melky =

Melky is a unisex given name. Notable people with the name include:

- Melky Cabrera (born 1984), Dominican baseball player
- Melky Goeslaw (1947–2006), Indonesian singer and boxing manager
- Melky Mesa (born 1987), Dominican baseball player
- Melky Ndokomandji (born 1997), Central African footballer
- Melky Jean, singer, half of the Haitian-American R&B hip hop duo Melky Sedeck;, sister of Wyclef Jean
