= Welcome to Haiti: Creole 101 =

Studio album by Wyclef Jean
- Released: October 5, 2004
- Recorded: 2003–2004
- Genre: Reggae; kompa; dancehall; bachata; world
- Length: 65:47
- Label: Koch
- Producer: Wyclef Jean, Jerry 'Wonder' Duplessis

Wyclef Jean chronology
The Preacher's Son (2003)	Welcome to Haiti: Creole 101 (2004)	Carnival Vol. II: Memoirs of an Immigrant (2007)

Singles from Welcome to Hati: Creole 101
- 1. "President" Released: October 1, 2004

Professional ratings
Review scores
Source	Rating
AllMusic	3.5/5 stars
RapReviews	7.5/10
Rolling Stone	2/5 stars

Welcome to Haiti: Creole 101 is the fifth studio album by Haitian rapper Wyclef Jean, released on October 5, 2004. The album, which was co-produced by Jean and long time collaborator Jerry 'Wonda' Duplessis, combines elements of reggae, kompa, dancehall, bachata, and world music. The album contains guest appearances from the likes of Sweet Mickey, Foxy Brown, 2Face Idibia and Sound Sultan. The album was inspired by Jean's love for Creole music, and Jean stated that the album was designed to be as "far from Billboard Hot 100-topping music as possible", describing the record as an instant "cult classic".

The album features performances in a number of languages, including English, French, Creole and Spanish. Only one single, "President" was released from the album, although in some territories, "Haitian Mafia" acted as a double A-side. "La Bamba" was released as a promotional vinyl single for radio airplay only. Due to the number of French-language tracks, the album's overall track listing differed between the US and Europe, with the final four tracks differing between the two territories. The album was released independently on Koch Records.

== Track listing ==
Welcome to Haiti: Creole 101 – Standard edition
No.	Title	Writer(s)	Producer(s)	Length
1.	"Jean Dominique" (Intro)	Wyclef Jean; Jerry Duplessis	Jerry "Wonda" Duplessis	1:08
2.	"President"	Jean; Duplessis	Jerry "Wonda" Duplessis	3:36
3.	"24 é Tan Pour Viv"	Jean; Duplessis; Rodrigue Millien	Jerry "Wonda" Duplessis	4:06
4.	"Bicentennial" (featuring Sweet Mickey)	Jean; Duplessis; Ti Anstyo; Michel Martelly; Nicky Chinn; Mike Chapman	Jerry "Wonda" Duplessis	4:02
5.	"Generation X"	Jean; Duplessis	Jerry "Wonda" Duplessis	4:37
6.	"Party By the Sea" (featuring T-Vice and Buju Banton)	Jean; Duplessis; Mark Myrie; Roberto Martinez; Reynaldo Martinez	T-Vice, Jerry "Wonda" Duplessis	3:51
7.	"Haitian Mafia" (featuring Foxy Brown)	Jean; Duplessis; Inga Marchand	Jerry "Wonda" Duplessis	4:07
8.	"Le Ou Marye"	Cyriaque Achille Paris	Fabrice Rouzier, Jerry "Wonda" Duplessis	5:30
9.	"Fistibal Festival" (featuring Melky and Bud)	Jean; Duplessis; Diane Warren; Wayne Ramsey	Jerry "Wonda" Duplessis	4:28
10.	"La Bamba" (featuring Ro-K and Gammy)	Ritchie Valens	Jerry "Wonda" Duplessis	3:59
11.	"Bay Micro'm Volume"	Jean; Duplessis	Jerry "Wonda" Duplessis	5:20
12.	"Proud to Be African" (featuring 2Face, Sound Sultan and Faze)	Jean; Duplessis; Innocent Idibia; Olanrewaju Fasasi; Chibuzor Oji	Jerry "Wonda" Duplessis	4:11
13.	"Douce"	Jean; Duplessis; Jocelyne Labylle	Jerry "Wonda" Duplessis	4:08

Welcome to Haiti: Creole 101 – European edition
No.	Title	Writer(s)	Producer(s)	Length
14.	"La Vie Ghetto" (featuring Passi)			3:57
15.	"Nou Va Rive"	Jean; Duplessis	Jerry "Wonda" Duplessis	4:29
16.	"Pistach"			4:10
17.	"Marasa" (featuring Dadi)			5:13

Welcome to Haiti: Creole 101 – US edition
No.	Title	Writer(s)	Producer(s)	Length
14.	"Lavi New York" (featuring Buggah)	Jean; Duplessis; Buggah Govanah	Jerry "Wonda" Duplessis	4:17
15.	"Fanm Kreyol" (featuring Admiral T)	Jean; Duplessis; Christy Campbell	Jerry "Wonda" Duplessis	3:58
16.	"Nou Va Rive"	Jean; Duplessis	Jerry "Wonda" Duplessis	4:29

Welcome to Haiti: Creole 101 – Vinyl
No.	Title	Length
1.	"Haitian Mafia"	4:16
2.	"24 é Tan Pour Viv"	4:06
3.	"Festival" (featuring Katia)	4:29
4.	"Lavi New York" (featuring Buggah)	4:17
5.	"Haitian Mafia" (featuring Foxy Brown)	4:07
6.	"24 Heures à Vivre (67 Montréal St-Michel)" (featuring Muzion)	4:17
7.	"Festival" (featuring Katia and Passi)	4:35
8.	"Lavi New York" (featuring Passi)	4:13

== Chart performance ==
Chart (2004–05)	Peak position
Canadian Albums (Nielsen SoundScan)	24
Canadian R&B Albums (Nielsen SoundScan)	5
US Independent Albums (Billboard)	35
US Top R&B/Hip-Hop Albums (Billboard)	66
