= Cheated (To All the Girls) =

Single by Wyclef Jean

from the album Wyclef Jean Presents The Carnival
- Released: July 28, 1998
- Recorded: 1997
- Genre: Hip hop; reggae fusion; R&B; soul
- Length: 4:13
- Label: Ruffhouse; Columbia
- Songwriter: Nelust Jean
- Producers: Jerry 'Wonder' Duplessis; Wyclef Jean

Wyclef Jean singles chronology
"Gone till November" (1997)	"Cheated (To All the Girls)" (1998)	"Gunpowder" (1998)

"Cheated (To All the Girls)" is the fourth single released from Wyclef Jean's debut solo album, The Carnival. It is a remixed version of the album track "To All the Girls". The song was mildly successful in the US, where it reached number 61 on the US Billboard Hot 100 chart. Additionally, it reached number six on the Hot Rap Songs chart and number 48 in the Hot R&B/Hip-Hop Songs. The single was backed with a brand new track featuring fellow Fugees member Pras, entitled "What's Clef".

== Track listing ==
American CD Single

1. "Cheated (To All the Girls)" (R'N'B Remix)
2. "What's Clef" (Featuring Pras)
3. "Chickenhead" (Icerider Remix)
4. "Cheated (To All the Girls)" (Rock Remix)
5. "To All the Girls" (LP Version)

German CD Single

1. "Cheated (To All the Girls)" (R'N'B Remix)
2. "What's Clef" (Featuring Pras)
3. "Chickenhead" (Icerider Remix)
4. "Cheated (To All the Girls)" (Rock Remix)

== Chart performance ==
Cheated (To All the Girls) peaked at number 61 on the US Billboard Hot 100 and spent a total of 8 weeks on the chart. The single also charted at number 48 on the US Hot R&B/Hip-Hop Songs and number six on the Hot Rap Songs chart. The single was the first of Jean's singles not to be released in the UK.

== Charts ==
=== Weekly charts ===
Chart (1998)	Peak position
Canadian Singles Chart	19
US Billboard Hot 100	61
US Hot R&B/Hip-Hop Songs	48
US Hot Rap Songs	6
