= Aristides Aquino =

Dominican baseball player (born 1994)

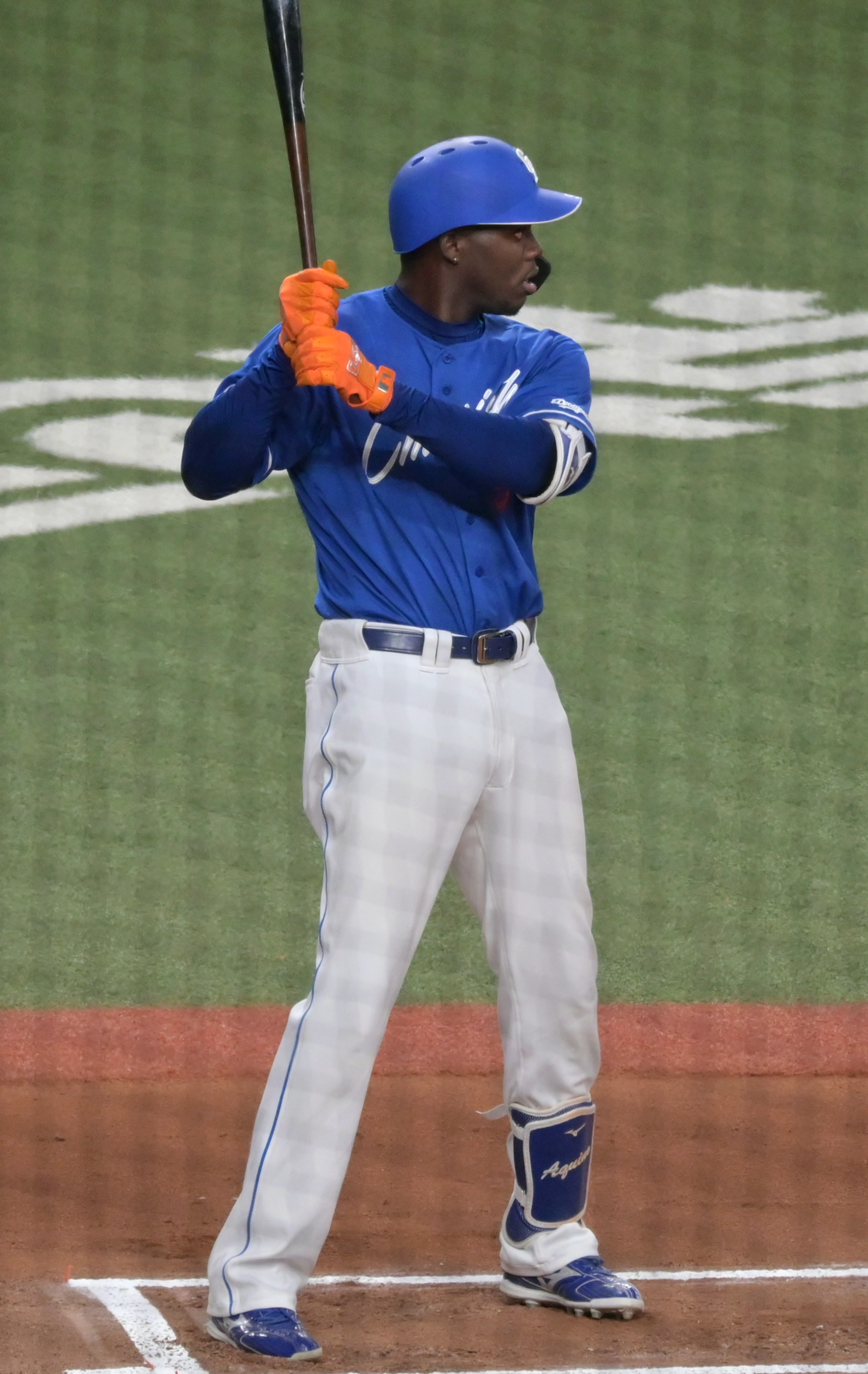
- Aquino with the Chunichi Dragons in 2023

Guerreros de Oaxaca – No. 56
- Outfielder
- Born: April 22, 1994 (age 32); Santo Domingo, Dominican Republic
- Bats: Right Throws: Right

Professional debut
- MLB: August 19, 2018, for the Cincinnati Reds
- NPB: March 31, 2023, for the Chunichi Dragons

MLB statistics (through 2022 season)
- Batting average: .211
- Home runs: 41
- Runs batted in: 108

NPB statistics (through 2023 season)
- Batting average: .154
- Home runs: 1
- Runs batted in: 6
- Stats at Baseball Reference

Teams
- Cincinnati Reds (2018–2022); Chunichi Dragons (2023)

Aristides Aquino Núñez (born April 22, 1994) is a Dominican professional baseball outfielder for the Guerreros de Oaxaca of the Mexican League. He has previously played in Major League Baseball (MLB) for the Cincinnati Reds, and in Nippon Professional Baseball (NPB) for the Chunichi Dragons.

== Career ==
=== Cincinnati Reds ===
Aquino signed with the Cincinnati Reds as an international free agent from the Dominican Prospect League in January 2011. He made his professional debut that year with the Dominican Summer League Reds and also spent 2012 playing with them. He played for the Arizona League Reds and Billings Mustangs in 2013, Billings in 2014 and Billings and Dayton Dragons in 2015. In 2016, he played for the Daytona Tortugas and was named the Florida State League Player of the Year. The Reds added him to their 40-man roster after the season.

Aquino was called up to the majors for the first time on August 17, 2018, to take the place of Joey Votto, who was placed on the 10-day disabled list. On August 19, Aquino made his major league debut as a pinch runner for Scooter Gennett. Aquino stayed in the game to play right field, and later struck out in his first major league at bat facing Ray Black. He was non-tendered and became a free agent on November 30. Aquino re-signed with Cincinnati on a minor league contract on December 3.

He opened the 2019 season with the Louisville Bats. On August 1, the Reds selected Aquino's contract. Aquino hit seven home runs in his first ten major league games, tying the record of Trevor Story. On August 10, 2019, in a game against the Chicago Cubs, Aquino hit three home runs, becoming the first rookie in MLB history to hit a home run in three consecutive innings, and the second rookie after Bobby Estalella to have a three home run game in his first ten career games.

On August 16, 2019, Aquino became the first player in modern MLB history with 10 home runs in his first 16 career games. The next day, he hit his eleventh home run in 17 games. He also holds the record for most home runs in a month for a National League rookie (14), in addition to tying the Reds franchise record for home runs in a month for any player.

Aquino saw limited playing time in 2020 due to the addition of Nick Castellanos, appearing in only 23 games, batting a meager .170/.304/.319 with 2 home runs and 8 RBI.

On April 25, 2021, Aquino was placed on the 60-day injured list as he recovered from hamate bone surgery. He was activated on June 13.

On April 30, 2022, Aquino was designated for assignment by the Cincinnati Reds and was sent outright to Triple-A. On May 20, Aquino was selected back to the active roster. He was removed from the 40-man roster and returned to Triple-A on May 23, but was selected back to the active roster hours later.

On November 15, Aquino was designated for assignment. On November 18, he was non-tendered and became a free agent.

=== Chunichi Dragons ===
On November 27, 2022, Aquino signed with the Chunichi Dragons of Nippon Professional Baseball. In 20 games he slashed .154/.262/.176 with 1 home run and 6 RBI and he became a free agent following the 2023 season.

=== Diablos Rojos del México ===
On February 19, 2024, Aquino signed with the Diablos Rojos del México of the Mexican League. In 59 games, he slashed .296/.390/.491 with nine home runs, 37 RBI and five stolen bases. With the team, Aquino won the Serie del Rey.

Aquino made 70 appearances for México during the 2025 season, batting .277/.353/.515 with 15 home runs, 50 RBI, and 12 stolen bases. With the team, he won his second consecutive Serie del Rey.

=== Guerreros de Oaxaca ===
On January 13, 2026, Aquino was traded to the Guerreros de Oaxaca of the Mexican League.
