= Wyclef Jean Presents The Carnival =

Studio album by Wyclef Jean
- Released: 24 June 1997
- Genre: Hip hop
- Length: 73:51
- Labels: Ruffhouse; Columbia
- Producers: Wyclef Jean; Salaam Remi; Jerry Wonda; Pras

Wyclef Jean chronology
Wyclef Jean Presents The Carnival (1997)	The Ecleftic: 2 Sides II a Book (2000)

Singles from The Carnival
- 1. "We Trying to Stay Alive" Released: 27 May 1997; 2. "Guantanamera" Released: 8 October 1997; 3. "Gone till November" Released: 25 November 1997; 4. "Cheated (To All the Girls)" Released: 28 July 1998; 5. "Gunpowder" Released: 28 September 1998

Wyclef Jean Presents The Carnival, also known simply as The Carnival, is the debut studio album released by Haitian rapper Wyclef Jean. The album was released on 24 June 1997 by Ruffhouse Records through Columbia Records. Wyclef Jean also served as the album's executive producer with Pras and Lauryn Hill. The album features guest appearances from Celia Cruz and The Neville Brothers and multiple appearances from Jean's former Fugees bandmates, Pras and Lauryn Hill.

The album was released to critical acclaim. While commercially it peaked at number sixteen on the US Billboard 200 chart, and at number four on the US Top R&B/Hip-Hop Albums chart, it garnered Jean three Grammy Award nominations, including two nominations at the 40th Annual Grammy Awards, for Best Rap Album and Best Rap Performance by a Duo or Group for "Guantanamera", and Best Rap Solo Performance at the 41st Grammy Awards in 1999, for his top-ten hit "Gone till November".

== Music and lyrics ==
The album encompasses many musical genres, including hip hop, reggae, folk, disco, soul, Son Cubano and Haitian music. The album features guest appearances from Celia Cruz, The Neville Brothers, John Forté, Jeni Fujita, and Jean's bandmates from The Fugees, Lauryn Hill and Pras, among others. It also features skits between many of its songs, most of them set in a fictional trial for Wyclef Jean, in which he is accused of being "a player" and a "bad influence". The final three songs on the album are sung in Haitian Creole.

== Critical reception ==
Professional ratings
Review scores
Source	Rating
AllMusic	4/5 stars
Chicago Tribune	3.5/4 stars
Entertainment Weekly	A
The Guardian	3/5 stars
Los Angeles Times	3/4 stars
NME	8/10
Pitchfork	8.0/10
Rolling Stone	3.5/5 stars
Spin	8/10
The Village Voice	A−

The Carnival was released to critical acclaim. In a contemporary review for The Village Voice, music critic Robert Christgau found the album more R&B than the "diasporan flavors" it uses as "half decoration, half concept", and remarked that Jean uses the sampler for "one-dimensional tunes" that showcase his "well-articulated morality tales and popwise carnivalesque." In his review for Playboy, Christgau asserted that the album is more likely than any other well-meaning hip hop to impact the demographic it aims at and also works as an attempt to prove Jean is equally worthy of the attention given to Lauryn Hill.

Stephen Thompson of The A.V. Club, in a favorable review, called The Carnival "a stunning solo album that's light years beyond The Score". He also wrote "In his universalist embrace of music of all forms, Wyclef Jean makes a more powerful call for peace and unity than a thousand East Coast–West Coast 'Stop the violence, y'all' intros put together." The Carnival was voted the sixteenth best album of the year in The Village Voice's annual Pazz & Jop critics poll for 1997. Christgau, the poll's creator, ranked it twentieth on his own list.

In 2011, Rolling Stone ranked The Carnival the 69th best album of the 1990s.

== Commercial performance ==
The Carnival debuted at number sixteen on the US Billboard 200, selling 52,000 copies in its first week. It also debuted at number four on the US Top R&B/Hip-Hop Albums chart. The album spawned the singles "We Trying to Stay Alive", "Guantanamera", "Gone Till November", "Cheated (To All the Girls)" and "Gunpowder". On 16 December 1998, the album was certified double platinum by the Recording Industry Association of America (RIAA), and sold approximately two million copies worldwide.

== Track listing ==
The Carnival – Standard edition
No.	Title	Writer(s)	Producer(s)	Length
1.	"Court Clef" (Intro)	Nelust Jean	Jean	3:15
2.	"Apocalypse"	Jean	Jean	3:49
3.	"Guantanamera" (featuring Celia Cruz, Jeni Fujita, and Lauryn Hill)	Jean; Lauryn Hill; Jerry Duplessis; Pete Seeger; Julián Orbón; Joseíto Fernández; José Martí	Jean	4:30
4.	"Pablo Diablo (Interlude)" (featuring Crazy Sam and Talent)	Jean	Jean	0:39
5.	"Bubblegoose" (featuring Melky Sedeck)	Jean; Salaam Gibbs	Salaam Remi	3:49
6.	"To All the Girls (Prelude)"	Jean	Jean	0:29
7.	"To All the Girls"	Jean; Albert McKay; Albert Hammond; Ben Liebrand; Guy O'Brien; Harold David; Henry Jackson; Maurice White; Michael Wright; Philip Bailey; Sylvia Robinson	Jean	4:18
8.	"Down Lo Ho (Interlude)" (featuring Talent and Wil Shannon Briggs)	Jean	Jean	1:13
9.	"Anything Can Happen"	Jean; Duplessis	Jean	4:36
10.	"Gone till November"	Jean; Duplessis	Jean	3:27
11.	"Words of Wisdom (Interlude)"	Jean	Jean	0:45
12.	"Year of the Dragon" (featuring Lauryn Hill)	Jean; Hill; Duplessis; Gordon Sumner	Jean	4:07
13.	"Sang Fézi" (featuring Lauryn Hill)	Jean; Alan Price	Jean	4:02
14.	"Fresh Interlude"	Jean	Jean	1:45
15.	"Mona Lisa" (featuring The Neville Brothers)	Jean	Jean	4:30
16.	"Street Jeopardy" (featuring John Forté and R.O.C.)	Jean; John Forté; Duplessis	Jean	3:57
17.	"Killer M.C. (Interlude)" (featuring Pras)	Jean	Jean	0:32
18.	"We Trying to Stay Alive" (featuring John Forté and Pras)	Jean; Forté; Prakazrel Michel; Barry Gibb; Maurice Gibb; Robin Gibb	Pras	3:11
19.	"Gunpowder" (featuring Lauryn Hill)	Jean	Jean	4:24
20.	"Closing Arguments (Interlude)" (featuring Talent and Wil Shannon Briggs)	Jean	Jean	1:35
21.	"Enter the Carnival (Interlude)"	Jean	Jean	0:24
22.	"Jaspora"	Jean	Jean	4:03
23.	"Yelé" (featuring Joel Servilus and Lauryn Hill)	Jean	Jean	5:24
24.	"Carnival" (featuring Jacob Desvarieux, Jocelyne Béroard and Sweet Mickey)	Jean; Duplessis	Jean	5:06
Total length:				73:51

The Carnival – Bonus tracks
No.	Title	Writer(s)	Producer(s)	Length
25.	"Imagino (Creole version)"	Jean	Jean	3:46
26.	"Bubblegoose (Bakin' Cake Mix)"	Jean; Gibbs	Salaam Remi	3:30
27.	"No Airplay (Men in Blue)" (featuring Youssou N'Dour)	Jean	Jean	4:46
28.	"Cheated (To All the Girls) (R&B Remix)" (featuring Queen Pen)	Jean; Gibbs; Hammond; David	Salaam Remi	4:05
29.	"What's Clef?" (featuring Naomi Campbell)	Jean; Gibbs	Salaam Remi	4:17
30.	"Chickenhead (Icerider Remix)" (featuring Spragga Benz)	Jean; Gibbs; Hammond; David	Salaam Remi	4:31
Total length:				98:46

== Personnel ==
- Wyclef Jean – guitar, keyboards
- Rita Marley – background vocals
- Judy Mowatt – background vocals
- Marcia Griffiths – background vocals
- Sonny Kompanek – arranger
- Salaam Remi – producer, engineer, mixing
- Warren Riker – mastering, mixing
- Rudy – assistant engineer
- DJ Skribble – scratching
- Funkmaster Flex – scratching
- Crazy Sam & Da Verbal Assassins – performer
- Manuel Lecuona – mastering
- Rawle Gittens – mixing assistant
- Tony Gonzales – assistant engineer
- Lauryn Hill – arranger, performer, executive producer
- Jerry Duplessis – guitar, bass, producer
- Alex Olsson – mixing assistant
- John Forté – performer
- Jay Nicholas – mixing assistant
- Pras – performer, executive producer
- Melky Sedeck – performer
- New York Philharmonic Orchestra – performer
- Tomas Muscionico – photography
- Mike Roach – mixing assistant
- Storm Jefferson – mixing assistant
- Paul Epworth – assistant engineer
- Brian Dozoretz – engineer, mixing assistant
- Jocelyne Béroard – performer
- Sweet Micky – performer
- The Neville Brothers – performer
- Celia Cruz – performer

== Charts ==
=== Weekly charts ===
Weekly chart performance for Wyclef Jean Presents The Carnival
Chart (1997–1998)	Peak position
Canada Top Albums/CDs (RPM)	42
Dutch Albums (Album Top 100)	48
German Albums (Offizielle Top 100)	81
New Zealand Albums (RMNZ)	31
Norwegian Albums (VG-lista)	24
Swedish Albums (Sverigetopplistan)	16
Swiss Albums (Schweizer Hitparade)	28
UK Albums (Official Charts)	40
US Billboard 200	16
US Top R&B/Hip-Hop Albums (Billboard)	4

=== Year-end charts ===
1998 year-end chart performance for Wyclef Jean Presents The Carnival
Chart (1997)	Position
US Billboard 200	88
US Top R&B/Hip-Hop Albums (Billboard)	38

1998 year-end chart performance for Wyclef Jean Presents The Carnival
Chart (1998)	Position
US Billboard 200	91
US Top R&B/Hip-Hop Albums (Billboard)	81

== Certifications ==
Certifications for Wyclef Jean Presents The Carnival
Region	Certification	Certified units/sales
Canada (Music Canada)	Platinum	100,000^{^}
United Kingdom (BPI)	Silver	60,000^{*}
United States (RIAA)	2× Platinum	2,000,000^{^}
^{*} Sales figures based on certification alone.^{^} Shipments figures based on certification alone.
