= Reggae Gold 2013 =

Compilation album by Various Artists
- Released: July 23, 2013
- Genre: Reggae, dancehall, lovers rock
- Label: VP Records
- Producer: Chris Chin (exec)

Reggae Gold 2013 is a compilation reggae album from VP Records. It was released on July 23, 2013 and Reggae Gold is an annual series from VP Records beginning in 1992. The set begins with rap-star-turned-Rastafarian Snoop Lion's reggae-influenced sound on "Lighter's Up" featuring vocals from Kingston's Mavado and rising star Popcaan and then Major Lazer's "Jah No Partial" with Jamaican vocalist Johnny Osbourne. Reggae Gold 2013 features the talents of Beres Hammond & Shaggy, Gyptian, Konshens, Major Lazer featuring Johnny Osbourne and Snoop Lion featuring Mavado & Popcaan among others.

The first disc featured the recent hits, including Shaggy featuring Beres Hammond’ “Fight This Feeling”, Major Lazer’s “Jah No Partial”, Busy Signal’s “You and Me”, Gyptian’s “Wine Slow”, Sean Paul’s “Body”, Konshens “Bad Girl”, Snoop Lion’s “Lighters Up”, I-Octane’s “Gal Gimmie Bun”, Angela Hunte’s “One Shot” and more.

The second disc is a selection of classic hits from the past years. Disc 2 featured artists are: Ini Kamoze, Half Pint, Yellowman, Shabba Ranks, Red Rat, General Degree, Barrington Levy, Desmond Dekker, Bounty Killer and more. Reggae Gold 2013 landed second place on the Billboard Reggae Album chart

== Track listing ==
=== Disc 1 ===
No.	Title	Writer(s)	Producer(s)	Length
1.	"Lighters Up - Snoop Lion featuring Mavado & Popcaan"	C. Broadus, A. Hershey, T. Pentz, A. Rechtshaid, W. Henry, A. Bain, D. Brooks, A. Sutherland	Dre Skull, Major Lazer	3:47
2.	"Jah No Partial - Major Lazer"	L. James, E. Osbourne, J. Kiekegaard, T. Pentz	Major Lazer	4:12
3.	"Body - Sean Paul"	S. Henriques, R. Love, E. Hood, E. Goudy 11	Rico Love, Earl, E For Division One	4:11
4.	"Fi Di Jockey - Aidonia"	S. Lawrence, S. McGregor	Stephen "Di Genius" McGregor	3:07
5.	"Kotch - RDX"	A. Bedward, C. Williams, E. Mitchell, P. Mitchell, P. Mitchell	Paul "Cashflow" Mitchell	3:13
6.	"Wine Slow - Gyptian"	W. Edwards, T. Johnson, L. Savory	Tarik "Russian" Johnson	2:34
7.	"Gal Gimmie Bun - I-Octane"	B. Muir, S. Reid, S. Maxwell	Troy Hinds, Sean Reid	2:50
8.	"Bad Gal - Konshens"	G. Spence, J. Arison	Justus "Jusbus" Arison	2:55
9.	"One Shot - Angela Hunte"	J. Duplessis, A. Hunte, A. Altino, A. Dunkley, O. Castelli	Jerry "Wonda" Duplessis	3:02
10.	"Fight This Feeling - Shaggy featuring Beres Hammond"	O. Burrell, A. Fennell, H. Hammond, L. Dunbar, R. S. W. Dale, S. Pizzonia, S. Marsden	Sly & Robbie, Sting International, Steven "Lenky" Marsden(CO-PRODUCER)	3:19
11.	"Perfect Love Song - Morgan Heritage"	G. Spence, A. Gray, K. Macarthy	Linton "TJ" White, Morgan Heritage	3:43
12.	"You And Me - Busy Signal"	R. Gordon, G. Cowan	Garfield Cowan	3:56
13.	"Let's Get Silly - Queen Ifrica"	V. Morgan, J. McClure, D. Hayle	Jordan McClure, David Hayle	2:52
14.	"Gimmie Likkle One Drop - Tarrus Riley"	O. Riley, J. McClure, D. Hayle	Jordan McClure, David Hayle	2:52
15.	"Tuesday On The Rocks - Kes The Band"	Push Music, O. Hart, K. Dieffenthaller, K. Gonsalves	Bambino Musik, Justin "Jus Bus" Nation	3:20
16.	"Love Love Love - Etana Featuring Busy Signal"	S. McKenzie, R. Gordon, Push Music, O. Hart, K. Dieffenthaller, K. Gonsalves	Bambino Musik, Justin "Jus Bus" Nation	3:20

=== Disc 2 ===
No.	Title	Writer(s)	Producer(s)	Length
1.	"Israelites - Desmond Dekker"	D. Dacres, L. Kong, B. Atkinson	Leslie Kong	2:34
2.	"World-A-Music - Ini Kamoze"	I. Kamoze, R. Shakespeare, S. Dunbar	Sly & Robbie	5:46
3.	"Greetings - Half Pint"	L. Roberts	George Phang	3:36
4.	"Zungguzungguguzungguzeng - Yellowman"	W. Foster, H. Lawes	Henry "Junjo" Lawes	6:26
5.	"Here I Come - Barrington Levy"	P. Love, B. Levy	Paul "Jah Screw" Love	3:45
6.	"Twice My Age - Shabba Ranks & Krystal"	J. Brel, R. McKuen	Augustus "Gussie" Clarke	6:00
7.	"Everyone Falls In Love - Tanto Metro & Devonte"	M. Wolfe, W. Passley, S. Marsden, A. Kelly	Donovan Germain	3:48
8.	"Maestro - Beenie Man"	S. Marsden, G. Jackson, P. Roberts, M. Davis	Patrick Roberts	3:49
9.	"Dwayne - Red Rat"	W. Wilson, L. Dixon, A. Bradford, H. Browne, O. Preece	Haldane 'Danny' Browne	3:47
10.	"Pianist - General Degree"	Haldane 'Danny' Browne	C. Butt, H. Browne	3:37
11.	"Smoke The Herb - Bounty Killer"	R. Pryce, C. Browne, W. Johnson	King Jammy's	3:06
