= Curtis Fields =

American singer and songwriter

- Genres: R & B
- Label: Epic Records
- Website: http://www.thecurtisfields.com/

Curtis Fields is an American singer and songwriter. He is a former artist with Epic Records and performed at the 2013 BET Awards using an iPhone as a guitar.

== Early life and education ==
Fields was born in Little Rock, Arkansas. He began performing music at an early age when he would sing gospel during his father's national traveling ministry. He began attending Fisk University in 2006 where he trained and traveled with the Fisk Jubilee Singers. He also became a member of Alpha Phi Alpha, the first Greek organization for African Americans. It was during his time at Fisk that he decided to pursue a career in singing.

== Career ==
Fields began singing professional and performed alongside artists such as John Legend. He also was the winner of Nashville's WQQK's Grand Stand Competition, beating out hundreds of other performers. He continued his career by opening for acts such as Eric Roberson. His first single, Black Cherry, peaked at #2 in the Jazz/Funk category on CD Baby's Top 5. Fields's leading single from the Cherish the Day EP was entitled "Smoke & Mirrors", written by singer/songwriter Bertram "Nigel" Thompson and produced by Dwyane Lewis.

Fields caught his break in the music industry in 2012 when he appeared for the New Skool Rules auditions in Atlanta, Georgia. The auditions were held at SAE International in Atlanta in front of New Skool Rules and Epitome Entertainment. Fields was the last of more than 200 artists to audition. Fields had offers from five different record labels but signed a recording deal with Epic Records and a publishing deal with Universal Publishing within five weeks of his audition.

On June 30, 2013, Fields performed the song Opposites Attract at the 2013 BET Awards. His performance included him strumming a guitar on an iPhone and was called one of the 9 Most Memorable Moments of the awards by Yahoo! Music.

After leaving Epic Records due to creative differences, Fields resurfaced as lead singer for indie Soul/Electronic band The Pheels.

== Discography ==
=== Singles ===
- 2013, Opposites Attract
- 2012, Black Cherry
- 2012, Smoke and Mirrors

=== EP ===
- 2012, Cherish The Day
