= Melky Mesa =

Dominican baseball player (born 1987)

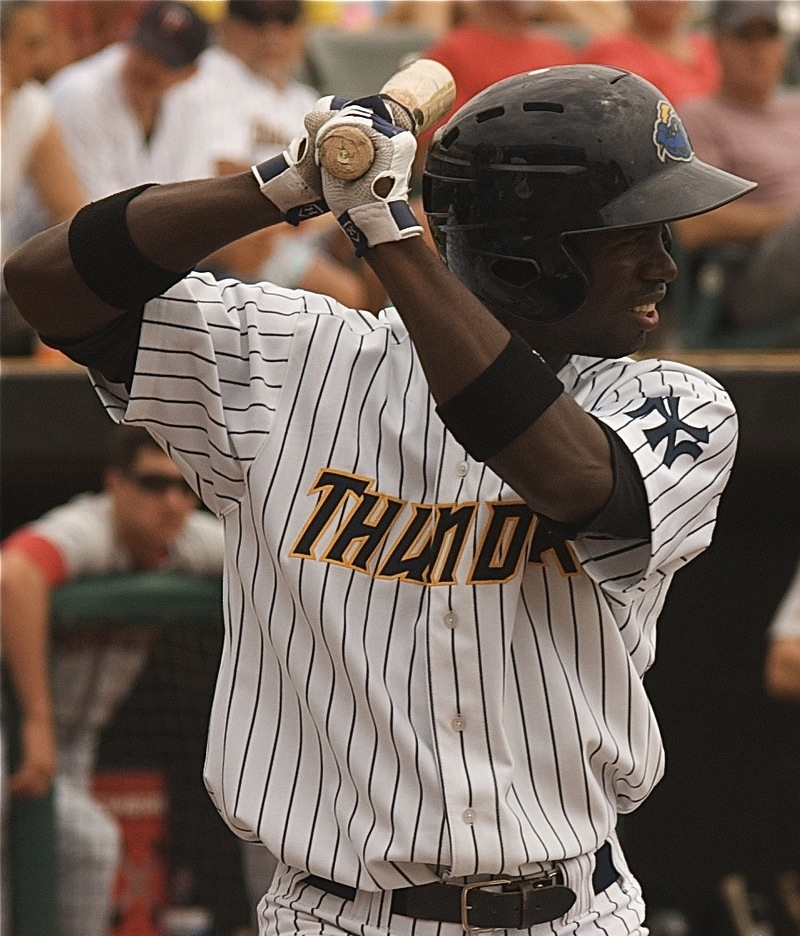
- Mesa batting for the Trenton Thunder in 2012
- Outfielder
- Born: January 31, 1987 (age 39); Bajos de Haina, Dominican Republic
- Batted: Right Threw: Right

MLB debut
- September 22, 2012, for the New York Yankees

Last MLB appearance
- July 31, 2013, for the New York Yankees

MLB statistics
- Batting average: .400
- Home runs: 0
- Runs batted in: 2
- Stats at Baseball Reference

Teams
- New York Yankees (2012–2013)

Melquisedec "Melky" Mesa (born January 31, 1987) is a Dominican former professional baseball outfielder. He played in Major League Baseball (MLB) for the New York Yankees from 2012 to 2013.

== Playing career ==
=== New York Yankees ===
The New York Yankees signed Mesa as an international free agent in 2003. He played in the Rookie-level Gulf Coast League (GCL) for the GCL Yankees in 2007, for the Staten Island Yankees of the Low-A New York–Penn League in 2008, and the Charleston RiverDogs of the Single-A South Atlantic League (SAL) in 2009. He was named to the SAL All-Star Game, and participated in the league's Home Run Derby that year.

In 2010, Mesa played for the Tampa Yankees of the High-A Florida State League and was named the league's Player of the Year. The Yankees added Mesa to their 40-man roster on November 2, 2010, to protect him from the Rule 5 draft.

The Yankees first promoted Mesa to the major leagues on September 10, 2012. Mesa made his major league debut on September 22, 2012, against the Oakland Athletics in the bottom of the 14th inning as a pinch runner with the score tied 9–9. Derek Jeter bunted him to second base, and one batter later, Alex Rodriguez hit a single up the middle which should have brought Mesa home, but Mesa stumbled as he rounded third base and missed the bag. This forced him to backtrack, preventing him from scoring the winning run in his first major league game. He recorded his first major league hit, an RBI single, on October 1 against Boston Red Sox pitcher Andrew Bailey.

Mesa was named the International League Player of the Week for the week ending August 11, 2013.

Mesa was released by the Yankees on September 1, 2013.

=== Kansas City Royals ===
Mesa signed a minor league deal with the Kansas City Royals on December 28, 2013, and played 23 games for the Triple-A Omaha Storm Chasers.

=== Toronto Blue Jays ===
On May 26, 2014, Mesa was traded to the Toronto Blue Jays along with P. J. Walters in exchange for cash considerations. Mesa was assigned to the Double-A New Hampshire Fisher Cats on May 27, then sent to the Triple-A Buffalo Bisons on June 12. He re-signed with the Blue Jays in January 2015. On January 12, 2015, he was assigned to the Double-A New Hampshire Fisher Cats. On April 30, 2015, he was promoted to the Triple-A Buffalo Bisons. On May 30, 2015, he was demoted back to New Hampshire. He elected free agency on November 7, 2015 and re-signed shortly afterwards.

Mesa split the 2016 campaign between New Hampshire and Buffalo, accumulating a .241/.299/.372 batting line with five home runs, 22 RBI, and five stolen bases across 69 games. He elected free agency following the season on November 7, 2016.

=== Saraperos de Saltillo ===
On July 7, 2017, Mesa signed with the Saraperos de Saltillo of the Mexican League. In 2 games for the team, he went 0-for-7. Mesa was released by Saltillo on July 11.

=== York Revolution ===
On February 16, 2018, Mesa signed with the York Revolution of the Atlantic League of Professional Baseball. In 100 appearances for York, he hit .337/.380/.577 with 20 home runs and 89 RBI. Following the season, Mesa was named York's team MVP for the year. He re-signed with team for the 2019 season, playing in 113 games and hitting .298/.326/.500 with 20 home runs and 70 RBI. Mesa became a free agent following the season.

On February 11, 2020, Mesa re-signed with the Revolution, but did not play in a game due to the cancellation of the Atlantic League season because of the COVID-19 pandemic. On March 23, 2021, Mesa re-signed with the Revolution. In 92 games for York, he slashed .330/.388/.574 with 18 home runs and 79 RBI. Mesa became a free agent following the season.

On February 15, 2022, Mesa again re-signed with York for the 2022 season. In 106 appearances for York, he batted .272/.344/.449 with 16 home runs and 77 RBI. Mesa became a free agent following the season.

== Coaching career ==
On February 7, 2025, the Philadelphia Phillies hired Mesa as the hitting development coach for the Dominican Summer League Phillies.
