= Jerry Duplessis =

Haitian record producer

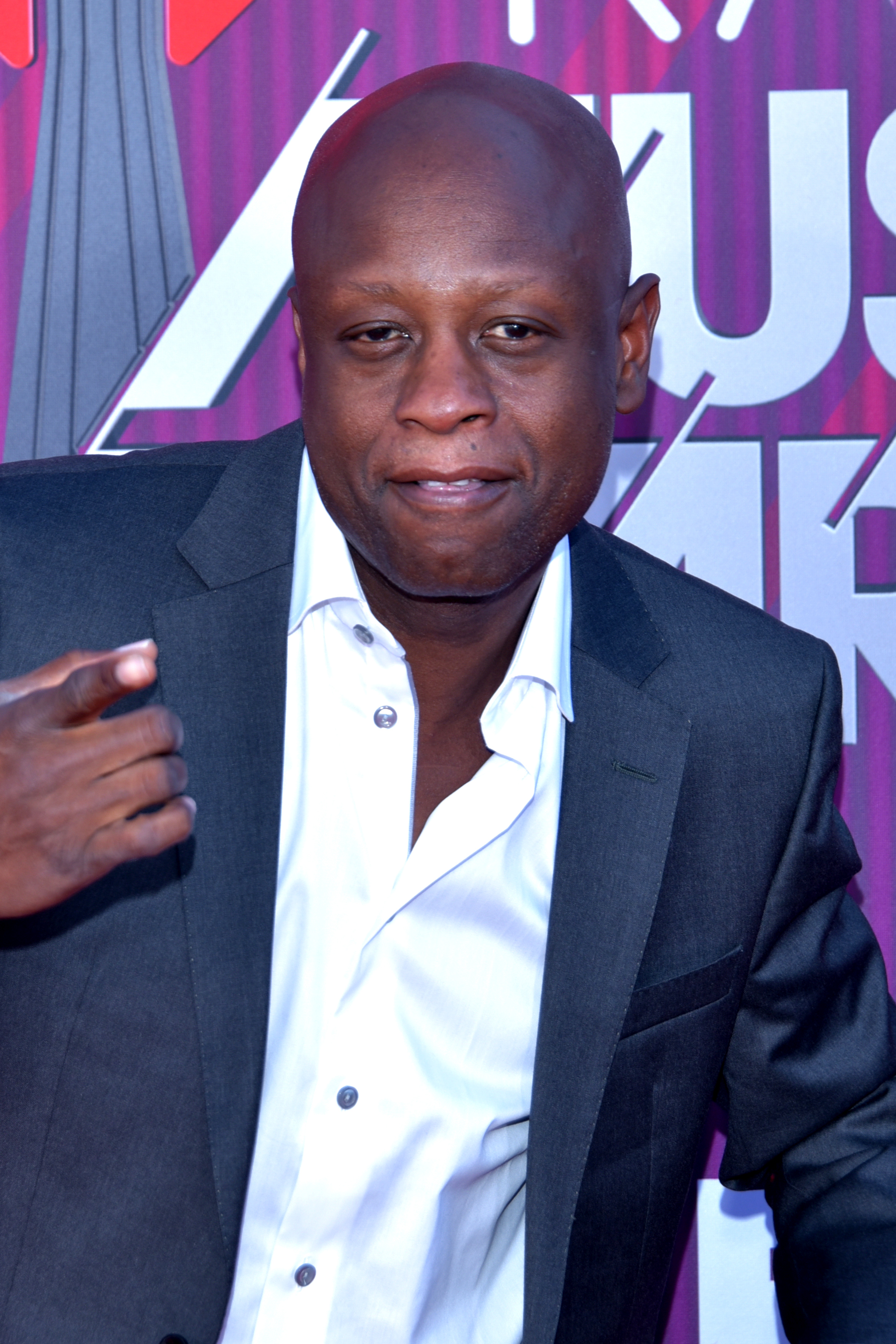
- Duplessis at the 2019 iHeartRadio Music Awards in Los Angeles

Background information
- Also known as: Jerry Wonda; Jerry Wonder; Te Bass
- Born: August 9, 1975 (age 51); Port-au-Prince, Haiti
- Occupations: Record producer; songwriter; musician
- Instruments: Bass guitar; keyboards
- Website: wondamusic.com

Jerry "Wonda" Duplessis (born August 9, 1975) is a Haitian record producer and musician. His first major success came as the producer of the Fugees' 1996 album The Score. He served as the bass guitarist for the group and is the cousin of Wyclef Jean, with whom he has collaborated on multiple projects.

== Early life ==
Jerry "Wonda" Duplessis was born and raised in a suburb of Port-au-Prince, Haiti. At 14, he began playing the bass. Early influences at this time included musicians Aston Barrett, and James Jamerson. At 16, he was sent to the US and was raised by his father and his aunt who was also musician Wyclef's mother. The basement of their family home soon became their home studio.

From church to some time at the Institute of Audio Research, and gigs wherever he could play, their home studio "Booga Basement" was opened serving artists near New Jersey. Wyclef, Samuel Pras Michel, and Lauryn Hill would then unite to create a new Caribbean style group ultimately known as the Fugees. Wonda and Wyclef would align to provide production for the group which would be signed by Ruffhouse/Columbia Records. Label mates at the time would include Cypress Hill and Kris Kross.

== Career ==
=== Jerry Wonda/Wyclef Jean years ===
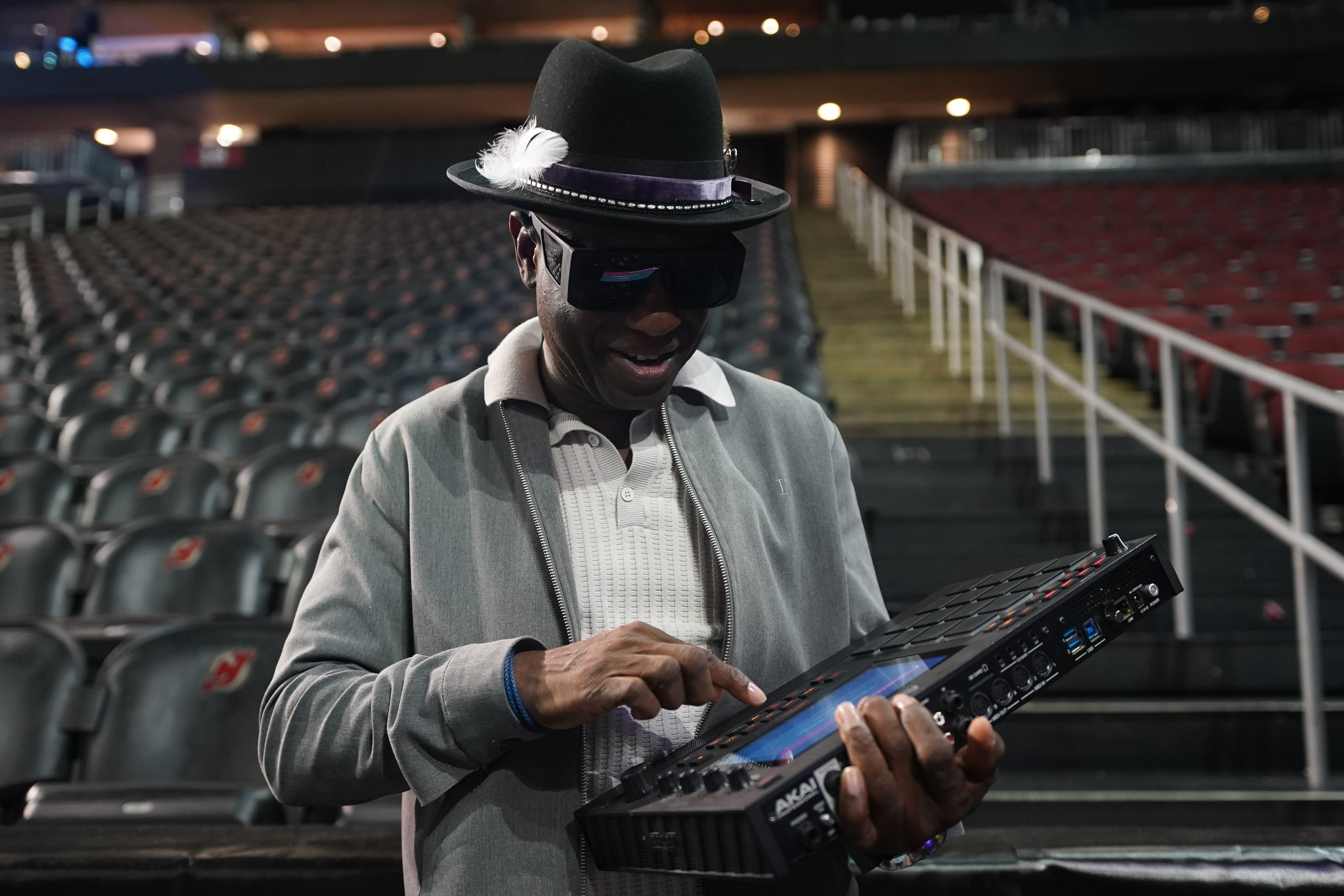
Jerry Wonda on the 2023 Fugees tour

Jerry Wonda and Wyclef Jean's producing took off with the Fugees. Their cover of the Roberta Flack classic "Killing Me Softly" sung by lead vocalist Lauryn Hill reached No. 2 on the Pop charts and No. 1 on the R&B charts. Co-produced by Wonda, their album The Score became one of the best-selling hip hop albums of all time gaining worldwide recognition.

Wonda and Wyclef made history in 2000. Santana's Supernatural single "Maria Maria", which Wonda co-produced, held the No. 1 chart position for 10 weeks. In 2006, the duo produced Shakira's worldwide hit "Hips Don't Lie" from the album Oral Fixation Vol. 2. It became the top-selling song of the 21st century and reached No. 1 in more than 50 countries, leading Shakira to be the 1st female Colombian singer to top Billboard's Hot 100 chart. They also co-wrote "My Love Is Your Love" for Whitney Houston's album of the same name.

=== Film scoring ===
In 1996, Wonda would co-produce the Fugees all-star Ali tribute "Rumble in the Jungle" featuring A Tribe Called Quest and Busta Rhymes for the Muhammad Ali documentary When We Were Kings. The Warren Beatty film Bulworth includes "Ghetto Superstar" performed by Pras Michel, ODB and Mýa and "How Come" by Senegalese singer Youssou N'Dour and rapper Canibus.

Alongside Wyclef and Andrea Guerra, Wonda wrote and produced the theme song "Million Voices" for the film Hotel Rwanda, which was nominated for a Golden Globe in 2005. The same song was later nominated for a Grammy Award in 2006. Other film credits include The Manchurian Candidate, Dave Chappelle's Block Party and 50 First Dates.

In 2001, Wonda built Platinum Sound Recording Studios in Times Square, New York City.

=== Since 2009 ===
In 2009, Wonda began producing music on his own, founding a production company called Wonda Music and placing his first major record with teen sensation, Justin Bieber for "U Smile." He has since followed up several placements to include artists Mary J. Blige, Musiq Soulchild, Keri Hilson, Estelle, Busta Rhymes, Miguel and Lupe Fiasco. Wonda began signing artists, producers, and songwriters to his Wonda Music imprint.

=== Producer and co-producer ===
Song title	Artist	Album	Year
"Gringa Files"	La'Ci	Gringa Files	2027
"Real Woman"	Monique The Star feat. Capella Grey	Soft Girl Era	2024
"League of My Own"	Samantha J feat. Dej Loaf	League of My Own	2015
"Come Over"	Ne-Yo	Nonfiction	2015
"Fool For You"	Curtis Fields	N/A	2015
"Come Around"	Slightly Stoopid	Meanwhile...Back at the Lab	2015
"Party Done"	Machel Montano feat. Angela Hunte	N/A	2015
"Soundboy Kill It"; "All About You"	Raekwon feat. Melanie Fiona; Estelle	Fly International Luxurious Art (F.I.L.A)	2015
"The Hustler"	LL Cool J feat. Mavado	GOAT 2	2014
"Lemonade"	Alex Boye	N/A	2014
"God I Get It"	K. Michelle	Anybody Wanna Buy a Heart?	2014
"I Got U"	Duke Dumont feat. Jax Jones	I Got U	2014
"Do It Again"; "Monster"	Melissa Etheridge	This Is M.E.	2014
"Dance With Me"; "Thanking You"; "I Gotta Have It"; "Missing You"	Tank	Stronger	2014
"Automatic"	Claudette Ortiz	TBD	2014
"Bring Back the Music"; "Say It"	Jennifer Hudson	JHUD	2014
"Ready Aim"	Mali Music	Mali Is...	2014
"No Fun Alone"	Mali Music	Mali Is...	2014
"Beautiful"	Mali Music	Mali Is...	2014
"One"	Mali Music	Mali Is...	2014
"Make It"	Mali Music	Mali Is...	2014
"One Shot"	Angela Hunte	Reggae Gold	2013
"Wonderland"	Keyshia Cole featuring Elijah Blake	Woman to Woman	2012
"Blame"	K'La featuring Nas	TBD	2012
"Fade Away"	Selah Sue	Selah Sue	2012
"Make It Shake"	Machel Montano featuring Busta Rhymes, Olivia, and Fatman Scoop	Wonda Music	2012
"Do You..."	Miguel	Kaleidoscope Dream	2012
"Freedom Ride"	Keri Hilson	Think Like a Man (Soundtrack)	2012
"Soldier Girl"	Olivia feat. Mavado	TBD	2012
"Hurt Somebody"; "Survivor"	Akon ft. French Montana; Mavado	Stadium/Konkrete Jungle	2012
"The Woman You Love"	Ashanti featuring Busta Rhymes	Braveheart	2012
"Back to Love"; "Thank You"; "Wonderful Life"	Estelle	All of Me	2012
"Never Let Go"	Anthony Hamilton	Back to Love	2011
"Feel Inside"; "Someone to Love Me (Naked)"; "Don't Mind"; "Over Love"	Mary J. Blige featuring Nas; Lil Wayne	My Life II... The Journey Continues (Act 1)	2011
"Out of My Head"; "Never Forget You"	Lupe Fiasco featuring Trey Songz; John Legend	Lasers	2011
"Rough Boy"	Wyclef Jean	ZZ Top – A Tribute From Friends	2011
"Anything"; "Say I Do"; "Silver & Gold"; "Back to Where"; "Waiting Still"	Musiq Soulchild	MusiqInTheMagiq	2011
"Southern Hospitality"	Hal Linton	TBD	2010
"All the Boys"	Keri Hilson	No Boys Allowed	2010
"U Smile"	Justin Bieber	My World 2.0	2010
"You've Got a Friend"	Ron Isley featuring Aretha Franklin	Mr. I	2010
"Someone to Love Me"	Diddy Dirty Money	Last Train to Paris	2010
"Grown Man"; "Dollar Sign"	Gucci Mane	The Appeal: Georgia's Most Wanted	2010
"Bedtime Story"	Buju Banton	Rasta Got Soul	2010
"Ballin"	Haitian Fresh	NBA Live 2010	2010
"Ice Cream Girl"	Sean Kingston	Tomorrow	2010
"Spanish Fly"	Aventura	The Last	2009
"Spy"	Shakira	She Wolf	2009
"You Think You Got It Bad"; "Wild Wild Wild"	Lyfe Jennings	Lyfe Change	2008
"Rollout"	Labelle	Back to Now	2008
"No Substitute Love"; "So Much Out the Way"	Estelle	Shine	2008
Various	Wyclef Jean	Carnival Vol. II: Memoirs of an Immigrant	2007
"You Know What It Is"; "My Swag"	T.I.	T.I. vs. T.I.P.	2007
"Coqui"	Omarion	Feel the Noise Soundtrack	2007
"I'm Coming Home"; "I Apologize"	Lionel Richie	Coming Home	2006
"Hips Don't Lie"	Shakira	Oral Fixation Vol. 2	2006
"Dangerous"	Ying Yang Twins	Chemically Imbalanced	2006
"Million Voices"	Hotel Rwanda Choir	Hotel Rwanda Soundtrack	2004
Various	Wyclef Jean	Creole 101	2004
Various	Wyclef Jean	The Preacher's Son	2003
Various	Tom Jones	Mr. Jones	2003
"Since Supernatural"	Santana	Shaman	2002
Various	Wyclef Jean	Masquerade	2002
Various	Jimmy Cozier	Jimmy Cozier	2001
Loving You (Ole Ole Ole)	Brian Harvey	Solo	2001
Various	City High	City High	2001
Various	Wyclef Jean	The Ecleftic: 2 Sides II a Book	2000
"Dancing Lessons"	Sinéad O'Connor	Faith and Courage	2000
"Rap Song"	Black Eyed Peas	Bridging the Gap	2000
"Lie Detector"; "Pussy Cat"	Mya	Fear of Flying	2000
"Maria Maria"	Santana	Supernatural	1999
"Loving Your Best Friend"	Eric Benet	A Day in the Life	1999
"Never Again"	Tevin Campbell	Tevin Campbell	1999
"No No No Part II"	Destiny's Child	The Writing's on the Wall	1999
"My Love is Your Love"	Whitney Houston	My Love is Your Love	1998
Various	Pras	Ghetto Supastar	1998
Various	Canibus	Can-I-Bus	1998
"Fly With Me"	98 Degrees	98 Degrees and Rising	1998
Various	Wyclef Jean	The Carnival	1997
Various	The Fugees	The Score	1996

== See also ==
- Jerry Wonda discography
