= Julián Orbón =

Spanish composer (1925–1991)

Julián Orbón de Soto (August 7, 1925, Avilés, Spain – May 21, 1991, Miami, Florida was a Cuban composer who lived and composed in Spain, Cuba, Mexico, and the United States of America. Aaron Copland referred to Orbón as "Cuba's most gifted composer of the new generation."

Julián Orbón

== Life ==
=== Family and early years ===
Julián Orbón was born on August 7, 1925, in Avilés, Spain, to Benjamín Orbón. Julián Orbón was exposed to music at a very early age because his father, Benjamín, was a composer and pianist. In 1932, Julián Orbón began taking piano lessons and basic music lessons from his father. At the age of ten, Julián Orbón attended the Oviedo Conservatory, where he received his first formal training.

In 1938, the Orbón family moved to Havana, Cuba. Here Orbón continued his musical training in piano under his father and his training in composition under José Ardévol, a Cuban composer and conductor. While teaching at the Havana Conservatory, Ardévol co-founded a Cuban school of composers with Orbón, called Grupo de renovación musical, including many of Ardévol's students. The members of this group included musicians Serafín Pro, Edgardo Martín, Argeliers León, Harold Gramatges, Hilario González, Dolores Torres Barrós, and Juan Antonio Cámara. This group was established to promote new Cuban music. While in Havana, Orbón's father also co-founded the Orbón Conservatory.

=== Musical training and career ===
When his father died in 1944, Julián Orbón took over as director of the Orbón Conservatory. A year later, he won a scholarship to study composition with Aaron Copland at the Berkshire Music Center at Tanglewood in Lenox, Massachusetts. After studying with Copland for about a year, Orbón returned to Havana to continue his position as director at the Orbón Conservatory. He did not stay long, however, because the Cuban Revolution began in 1953. In the wake of this revolution, Orbón permanently left Cuba and moved to Mexico City in 1960.

While in Mexico City, until 1963 Orbón taught composition alongside Carlos Chávez, a famous Mexican composer, conductor, and educator, at the Taller de Composición of the National Conservatory of Music. In 1964 Orbón moved to the United States to teach composition at Lenox College, Washington University in St. Louis, Barnard College, and the Hispanic Institute of Columbia University in New York City. He settled and lived in New York City the rest of his life.

=== Later years ===
Julián Orbón died of cancer at the age of 65 at Mount Sinai Medical Center in Miami, Florida. Orbón's sister, Ana Abril; wife, Mercedes; two sons, Andres and Julían; and two grandchildren are still alive.

== Music and accomplishments ==
=== Musical style ===
Julián Orbón created compositions that combined Spanish and Cuban styles and traits, Gregorian chant qualities, and African music styles. His early style was influenced by composers such as Manuel de Falla, Rodolfo Halffter, and Ernesto Halffter, who used a Spanish neoclassic style in their compositions. Orbón's works such as Suite de Siete Canciones de Juan del Encina and Homenaje a la Tonadilla clearly illustrate this Spanish neoclassic style. Other characteristics of Orbón's works include strong rhythmic activity and intense though straightforward expression. This strong rhythmic activity and intense and straightforward expression is a large part in Orbón's Preludio y danza for solo guitar depicted below.

Preludio y danza

Later Orbón was greatly influenced by Copland, Chávez, and Villa-Lobos because of his close friendships with them. Through these different influences, Orbón began to gradually compose pieces without the influence of the Spanish neoclassic style. His later style became more romantic and expressive, stemming from his sadness caused by having to leave Cuba.

=== Reception ===
Julián Orbón had many fellow musicians and composers who supported him and his music. Eduardo Mata, a Mexican conductor and composer, and Julio Estrada, a Mexican composer and historian, both praised Orbón's compositions, which helped spread positive opinions about Orbón throughout Latin America. Both Mata and Estrada were students of Orbón when he was teaching alongside Chávez in Mexico City. Aaron Copland was also a supporter of Orbón. However, much of Orbón’s music is unknown today, and little is performed in Cuba.

=== Awards ===
Julián Orbón won many awards for his compositions over his lifetime. Orbón won the Juan Landaeta Prize in 1954 at the First Caracas Latinamerican Musical Festival in Venezuela for his Tres versiones sinfónicas. Orbón also received many grants in order to compose. In 1958, he received a grant from the Koussevitzky Foundation, that he used to compose Concerto grosso, one of his best-received compositions. In 1959 and 1969, Orbón received Guggenheim Fellowships, American grants awarded to citizens of the United States, Canada, Latin America, and the Caribbean "who have demonstrated exceptional capacity for productive scholarship or exceptional creative ability in the arts." He also received an award in 1967 from the American Academy of Arts and Letters.

== Works ==
Julián Orbón composed many types of works, including orchestral, vocal, instrumental, and chamber music. Orbón also adapted the words for the piece "Guantanamera" from a poem by José Martí, a poet who is considered to be one of the greatest Latin American intellectuals and who dedicated his life to the independence of Cuba. "Guantanamera" is Cuba's best-known song. José Fernandez Diaz wrote the original melody for this piece.

=== Orchestral ===
- Symphony in C (1945)
- Homenaje a la Tonadilla (1947)
- Tres versiones sinfónicas (1953)
- Danzas sinfónicas (1955)
- Concerto Grosso (1958)
- Partitas No. 3 (1965-1966)
- Partitas No. 4 (1982-1985)

=== Choral ===
- Crucifixus (1953)
- Introito (1967-1968)
- Canciones folklóricas (1970-1972)
- Liturgia de tres días (1975)

=== Solo vocal ===
- Pregón (1943)
- Himnus ad galli cantum (1956)
- 3 cantigas del rey (1960)
- Libro de cantares (1987)

=== Chamber and solo instrument ===
- Homaje a Padre Soler (1942)
- Toccata (1943)
- Clarinet Quintet (1944)
- Preludio y danza (1950-1951)
- String Quartet (1951)
- Partita no. 1 (1963)
- Partita no. 2 (1964)
- Preludio y fantasia tiento (1974)
