= Billboard Year-End Hot 100 singles of 2001 =

Ranking of recorded music

This is a list of Billboard magazine's Top Hot 100 songs of 2001.

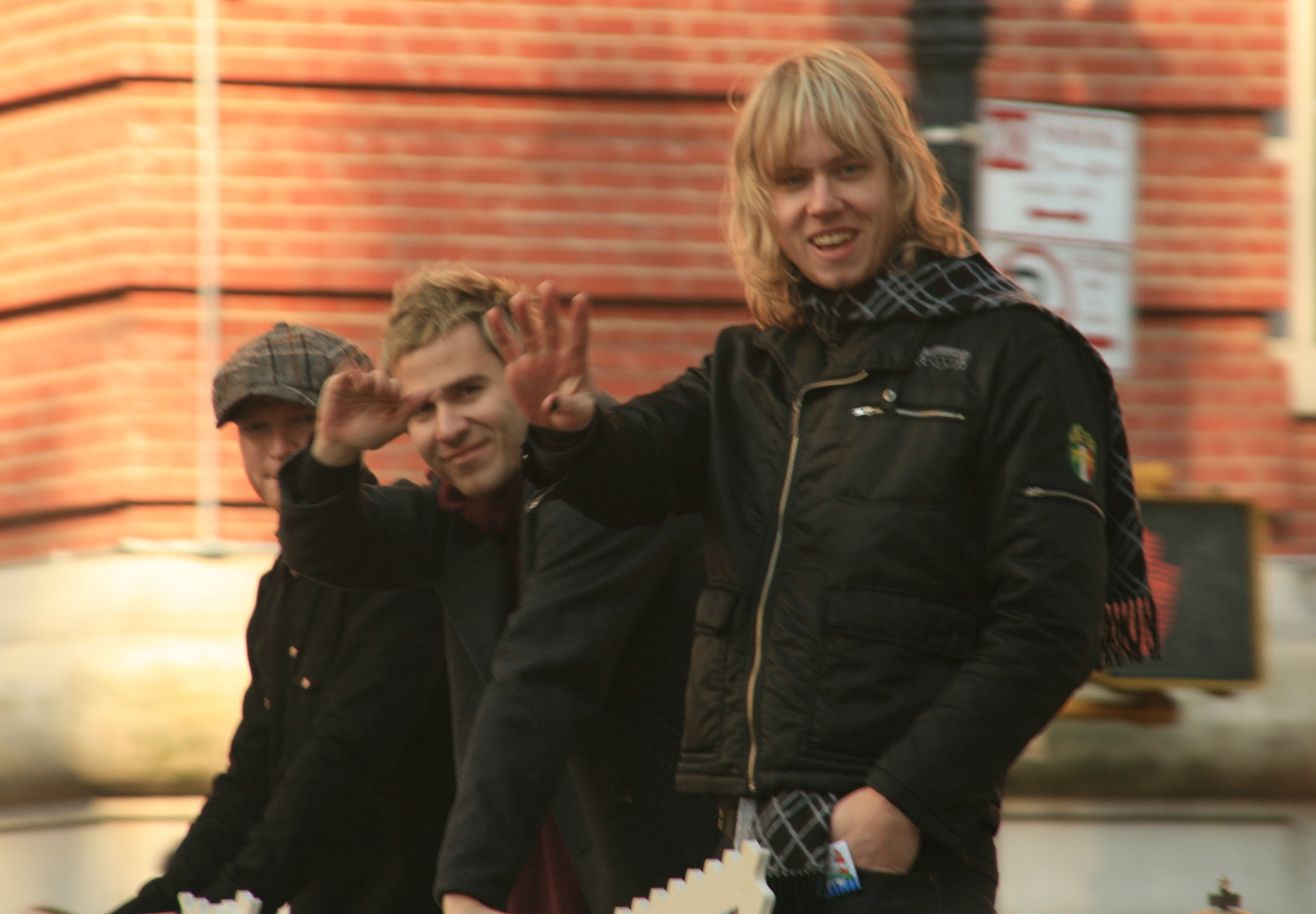
"Hanging by a Moment" by Lifehouse (pictured in 2007) was the best-performing single of 2001.

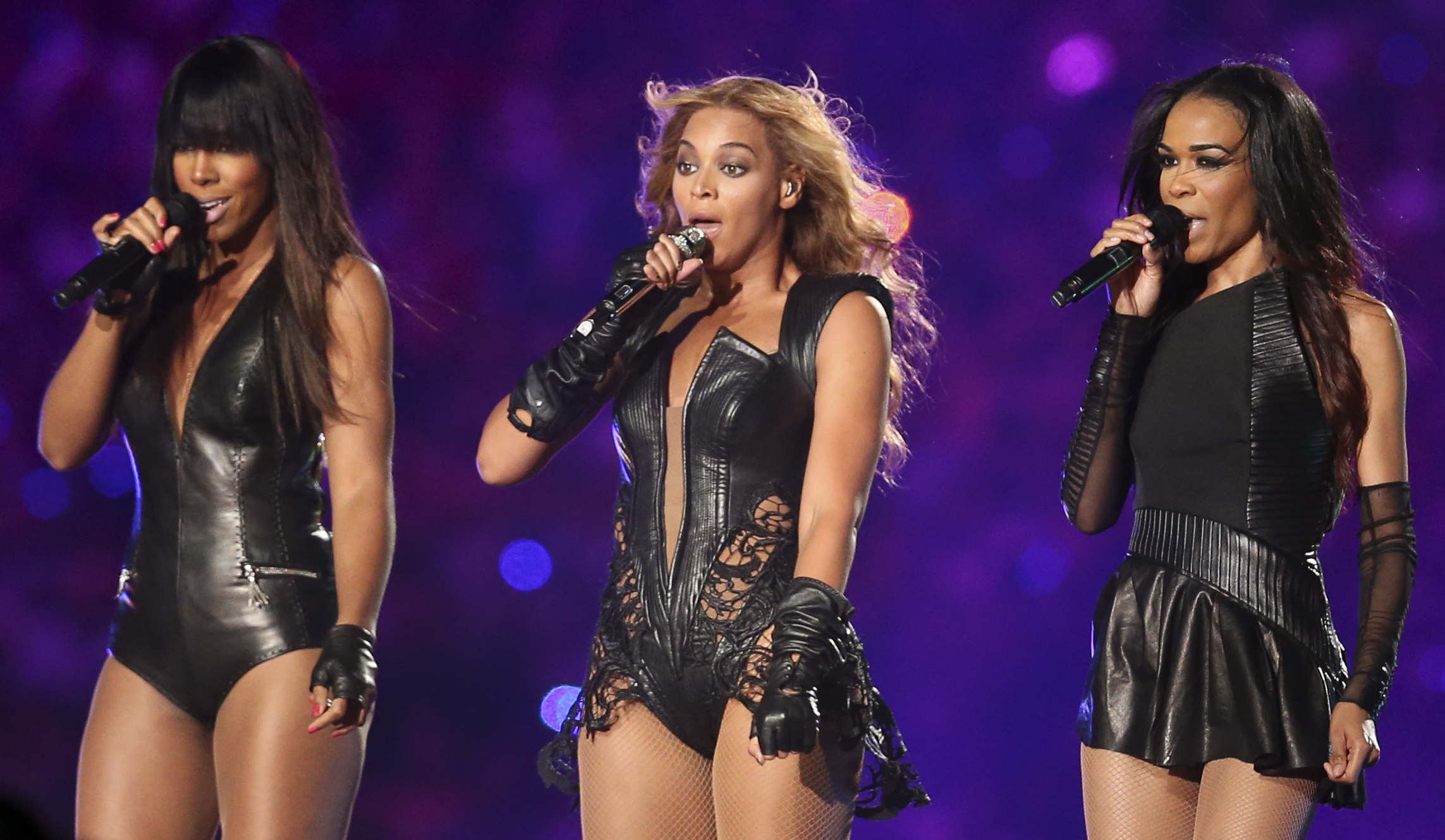
Destiny's Child (pictured in 2013) placed three songs on the list. The highest was their 11-week number-one song "Independent Women Part I", ranking at number 10.

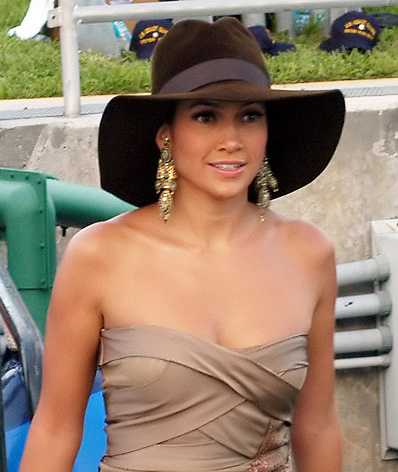
Jennifer Lopez (pictured in 2004) had the number-five song of 2001 with "I'm Real (Murder Remix)" and two other songs—"Love Don't Cost a Thing" at number 26 and "Play" at number 72.

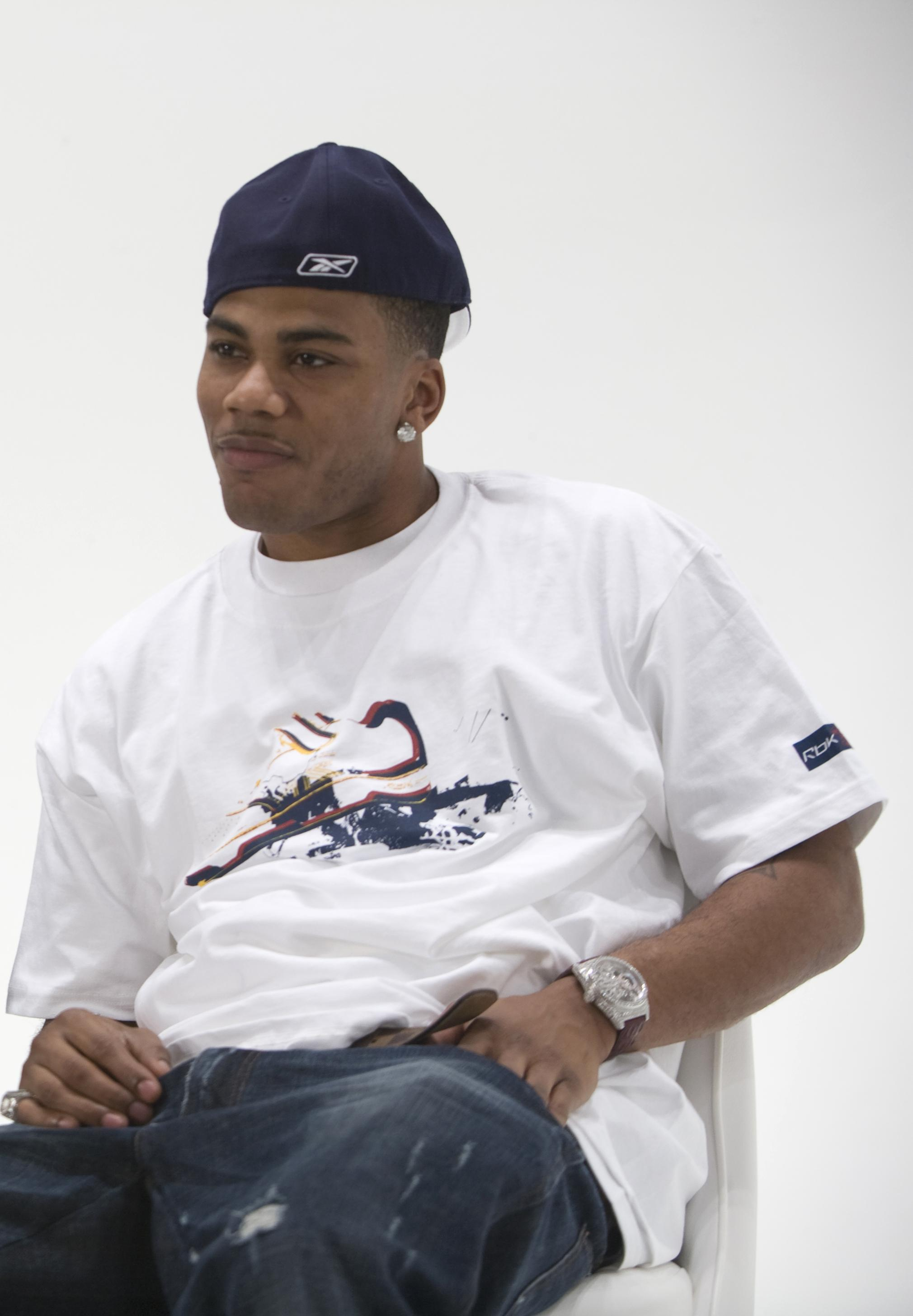
Nelly (pictured in 2007) had three songs on the year-end chart of 2001: "Where the Party At" with Jagged Edge, "Ride wit Me" (featuring City Spud), and his solo song "E.I.".

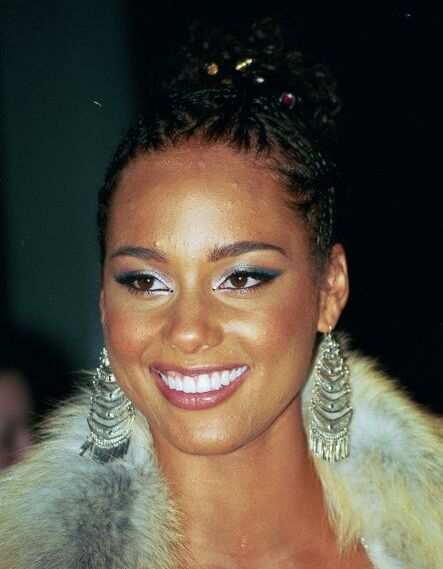
Alicia Keys's song "Fallin'" appeared at number two on the year-end chart for 2001.

No.	Title	Artist(s)
1	"Hanging by a Moment"	Lifehouse
2	"Fallin'"	Alicia Keys
3	"All for You"	Janet
4	"Drops of Jupiter (Tell Me)"	Train
5	"I'm Real (Murder Remix)"	Jennifer Lopez featuring Ja Rule
6	"If You're Gone"	Matchbox Twenty
7	"Let Me Blow Ya Mind"	Eve featuring Gwen Stefani
8	"Thank You"	Dido
9	"Again"	Lenny Kravitz
10	"Independent Women Part I"	Destiny's Child
11	"Hit 'Em Up Style (Oops!)"	Blu Cantrell
12	"It Wasn't Me"	Shaggy featuring Rikrok
13	"Stutter"	Joe featuring Mystikal
14	"It's Been Awhile"	Staind
15	"U Remind Me"	Usher
16	"Where the Party At"	Jagged Edge with Nelly
17	"Angel"	Shaggy featuring Rayvon
18	"Ride wit Me"	Nelly featuring City Spud
19	"Follow Me"	Uncle Kracker
20	"Peaches & Cream"	112
21	"Drive"	Incubus
22	"What Would You Do?"	City High
23	"Survivor"	Destiny's Child
24	"Lady Marmalade"	Christina Aguilera, Lil' Kim, Mýa and Pink
25	"Ms. Jackson"	Outkast
26	"Love Don't Cost a Thing"	Jennifer Lopez
27	"The Way You Love Me"	Faith Hill
28	"He Loves U Not"	Dream
29	"Butterfly"	Crazy Town
30	"Put It on Me"	Ja Rule featuring Lil' Mo and Vita
31	"Family Affair"	Mary J. Blige
32	"I Hope You Dance"	Lee Ann Womack
33	"South Side"	Moby featuring Gwen Stefani
34	"Don't Tell Me"	Madonna
35	"Get Ur Freak On"	Missy Elliott
36	"Crazy"	K-Ci & JoJo
37	"Fill Me In"	Craig David
38	"Someone to Call My Lover"	Janet
39	"With Arms Wide Open"	Creed
40	"Case of the Ex (Whatcha Gonna Do)"	Mýa
41	"All or Nothing"	O-Town
42	"Bootylicious"	Destiny's Child
43	"I'm Like a Bird"	Nelly Furtado
44	"Kryptonite"	3 Doors Down
45	"Fiesta"	R. Kelly featuring Jay-Z
46	"When It's Over"	Sugar Ray
47	"Jaded"	Aerosmith
48	"Promise"	Jagged Edge
49	"Missing You"	Case
50	"Differences"	Ginuwine
51	"This I Promise You"	NSYNC
52	"Izzo (H.O.V.A.)"	Jay-Z
53	"Superwoman Pt. II"	Lil' Mo featuring Fabolous
54	"Crazy for This Girl"	Evan and Jaron
55	"Nobody Wants to Be Lonely"	Ricky Martin and Christina Aguilera
56	"I Just Wanna Love U (Give It 2 Me)"	Jay-Z
57	"One Minute Man"	Missy Elliott featuring Ludacris
58	"Danger (Been So Long)"	Mystikal featuring Nivea
59	"Only Time"	Enya
60	"I Do!!"	Toya
61	"Never Had a Dream Come True"	S Club 7
62	"Stranger in My House"	Tamia
63	"Irresistible"	Jessica Simpson
64	"Heard It All Before"	Sunshine Anderson
65	"The Space Between"	Dave Matthews Band
66	"There You'll Be"	Faith Hill
67	"Love"	Musiq Soulchild
68	"It's Over Now"	112
69	"No More (Baby I'ma Do Right)"	3LW
70	"Turn Off the Light"	Nelly Furtado
71	"Ain't Nothing 'bout You"	Brooks & Dunn
72	"Play"	Jennifer Lopez
73	"I'm Already There"	Lonestar
74	"My Baby"	Lil' Romeo
75	"Beautiful Day"	U2
76	"Austin"	Blake Shelton
77	"Southern Hospitality"	Ludacris
78	"Grown Men Don't Cry"	Tim McGraw
79	"Livin' It Up"	Ja Rule featuring Case
80	"Loverboy"	Mariah Carey featuring Cameo
81	"Contagious"	The Isley Brothers featuring R. Kelly and Chanté Moore
82	"Who I Am"	Jessica Andrews
83	"Music"	Erick Sermon featuring Marvin Gaye
84	"I Wanna Be Bad"	Willa Ford
85	"Don't Happen Twice"	Kenny Chesney
86	"One More Day"	Diamond Rio
87	"I Wish"	R. Kelly
88	"It's a Great Day to Be Alive"	Travis Tritt
89	"I'm a Thug"	Trick Daddy
90	"Here's to the Night"	Eve 6
91	"You Shouldn't Kiss Me Like This"	Toby Keith
92	"Get Over Yourself"	Eden's Crush
93	"Dance with Me"	Debelah Morgan
94	"So Fresh, So Clean"	Outkast
95	"E.I."	Nelly
96	"Be Like That"	3 Doors Down
97	"Most Girls"	Pink
98	"Oochie Wally"	QB Finest featuring Nas and Bravehearts
99	"Hero"	Enrique Iglesias
100	"Hemorrhage (In My Hands)"	Fuel

== See also ==
- 2001 in music
- Billboard Year-End Hot R&B/Hip-Hop Singles & Tracks of 2001
- Billboard Year-End Hot Rap Singles of 2001
- List of Billboard Hot 100 number-one singles of 2001
- List of Billboard Hot 100 top-ten singles in 2001
