= Billboard Year-End Hot Rap Singles of 2001 =

American music chart

This is a list of Billboard magazine's Top Hot Rap Singles of 2001.

After increasing from 30 slots to 50 in 1994, both the main Hot Rap Singles chart and it's year-end chart are reduced to 25 slots in 2001.

No.	Title	Artist(s)
1	"My Baby"	Lil' Romeo
2	"What Would You Do?"	City High
3	"Ms. Jackson"	Outkast
4	"Bow Wow (That's My Name)"	Lil' Bow Wow featuring Snoop Dogg
5	"It Wasn't Me"	Shaggy featuring Rikrok
6	"Raise Up"	Petey Pablo
7	"Cross the Border"	Philly's Most Wanted
8	"My Projects"	Coo Coo Cal
9	"Purple Pills"	D12
10	"Baby If You're Ready"	Doggy's Angels
11	"Dollaz, Drank & Dank"	Mr. Short Khop featuring Kokane
12	"Oochie Wally"	Nas and Bravehearts
13	"Request + Line"	Black Eyed Peas featuring Macy Gray
14	"Shit on You"	D12
15	"Big Acts, Little Acts"	Afu-Ra featuring GZA
16	"Where I Wanna Be"	Shade Sheist featuring Kurupt and Nate Dogg
17	"Who's Gonna Love Ya"	Bigga Figgaz
18	"He Did That"	Silkk the Shocker featuring Master P and Mac
19	"Oh No"	Mos Def and Pharoahe Monch featuring Nate Dogg
20	"All I Wanna Do"	The Young Millionaires
21	"The Wood"	Papa Seville
22	"Souljas"	Master P
23	"Uhhnnh"	The Bad Seed
24	"None Tonight"	Lil Zane
25	"Po' Punch"	Po' White Trash and the Trailer Park Symphony

== See also ==
- 2001 in music
- Billboard Year-End Hot 100 singles of 2001
- Billboard Year-End Hot R&B/Hip-Hop Singles & Tracks of 2001
- List of Billboard number-one rap singles of 2001
