= Billboard Year-End Hot R&B/Hip-Hop Singles & Tracks of 2001 =

American music chart

This is a list of Billboard magazine's Top Hot R&B/Hip-Hop Singles & Tracks of 2001.

No.	Title	Artist(s)
1	"Fiesta" (remix)	R. Kelly featuring Jay-Z and Boo & Gotti
2	"Missing You"	Case
3	"Love"	Musiq Soulchild
4	"Where the Party At"	Jagged Edge featuring Nelly
5	"Stutter"	Joe featuring Mystikal
6	"U Remind Me"	Usher
7	"Peaches & Cream"	112
8	"Promise"	Jagged Edge
9	"Fallin'"	Alicia Keys
10	"Heard It All Before"	Sunshine Anderson
11	"Get Ur Freak On"	Missy Elliott
12	"Put It on Me"	Ja Rule featuring Lil' Mo and Vita
13	"Differences"	Ginuwine
14	"Stranger in My House"	Tamia
15	"It's Over Now"	112
16	"Could It Be"	Jaheim
17	"Family Affair"	Mary J. Blige
18	"Ms. Jackson"	Outkast
19	"I'm Real (Murder Remix)"	Jennifer Lopez featuring Ja Rule
20	"Superwoman Pt. II"	Lil' Mo featuring Fabolous
21	"Danger (Been So Long)"	Mystikal featuring Nivia
22	"All for You"	Janet Jackson
23	"I Just Wanna Love U (Give It 2 Me)"	Jay-Z
24	"Music"	Erick Sermon featuring Marvin Gaye
25	"Southern Hospitality"	Ludacris
26	"A Long Walk"	Jill Scott
27	"Maybe I Deserve"	Tank
28	"Contagious"	The Isley Brothers featuring R. Kelly and Chanté Moore
29	"Let Me Blow Ya Mind"	Eve featuring Gwen Stefani
30	"Izzo (H.O.V.A.)"	Jay-Z
31	"Just Friends (Sunny)"	Musiq Soulchild
32	"So Fresh, So Clean"	Outkast
33	"My First Love"	Avant featuring Keke Wyatt
34	"It Wasn't Me"	Shaggy featuring Ricardo "RikRok" Ducent
35	"Feelin' on Yo Booty"	R. Kelly
36	"She's All I Got"	Jimmy Cozier
37	"After Party"	Koffee Brown
38	"My Baby"	Lil' Romeo
39	"Just In Case"	Jaheim
40	"Take You Out"	Luther Vandross
41	"Rock the Boat"	Aaliyah
42	"One Minute Man"	Missy Elliott featuring Ludacris
43	"Independent Women Part I"	Destiny's Child
44	"Can't Believe"	Faith Evans featuring Carl Thomas
45	"The Way"	Jill Scott
46	"I'm a Thug"	Trick Daddy
47	"Survivor"	Destiny's Child
48	"I Wish"	R. Kelly
49	"One Woman Man"	Dave Hollister
50	"Lifetime"	Maxwell
51	"Livin' It Up"	Ja Rule featuring Case
52	"Wait a Minute"	Ray J featuring Lil' Kim
53	"Emotional"	Carl Thomas
54	"Oochie Wally"	Nas and Bravehearts
55	"Video"	India Arie
56	"Can't Deny It"	Fabolous featuring Nate Dogg
57	"Bootylicious"	Destiny's Child
58	"Loverboy"	Mariah Carey featuring Da Brat and Ludacris
59	"Hit 'Em Up Style (Oops!)"	Blu Cantrell
60	"Area Codes"	Ludacris featuring Nate Dogg
61	"Raise Up"	Petey Pablo
62	"Bow Wow (That's My Name)"	Lil' Bow Wow featuring Snoop Dogg
63	"Bizounce"	Olivia
64	"U Got It Bad"	Usher
65	"Ugly"	Bubba Sparxxx
66	"What Would You Do?"	City High
67	"Love of My Life"	Brian McKnight
68	"We Need a Resolution"	Aaliyah featuring Timbaland
69	"I Cry"	Ja Rule featuring Lil' Mo
70	"Set It Off"	Juvenile
71	"What It Is"	Violator featuring Busta Rhymes
72	"Soul Sista"	Bilal
73	"Is That Your Chick?"	Memphis Bleek featuring Jay-Z and Missy Elliott
74	"Bad Boy for Life"	P. Diddy, Black Rob and Mark Curry
75	"There She Goes"	Babyface
76	"Lay Low"	Snoop Dogg featuring Master P, Nate Dogg, Butch Cassidy and Tha Eastsidaz
77	"Bag Lady"	Erykah Badu
78	"Who's That Girl?"	Eve
79	"There It Is"	Ginuwine
80	"You Rock My World"	Michael Jackson
81	"911"	Wyclef Jean featuring Mary J. Blige
82	"Dance with Me"	112
83	"Project Chick"	Cash Money Millionaires
84	"Don't Talk"	Jon B.
85	"Fill Me In"	Craig David
86	"Until the End of Time"	2Pac
87	"I Like Them Girls"	Tyrese
88	"You Gets No Love"	Faith Evans
89	"Let's Get It"	G. Dep featuring P. Diddy and Black Rob
90	"Didn't Cha Know"	Erykah Badu
91	"Mamacita"	Public Announcement
92	"E.I."	Nelly
93	"What's Your Fantasy"	Ludacris featuring Shawnna
94	"Girls, Girls, Girls"	Jay-Z
95	"Take It to da House"	Trick Daddy featuring Slip-n-Slide Express
96	"What Am I Gonna Do"	Tyrese
97	"Get to Know Ya"	Maxwell
98	"Between Me and You"	Ja Rule featuring Christina Milian
99	"Oh No"	Mos Def and Pharoahe Monch featuring Nate Dogg
100	"Open My Heart"	Yolanda Adams

== See also ==
- 2001 in music
- Billboard Year-End Hot 100 singles of 2001
- Billboard Year-End Hot Rap Singles of 2001
- List of Hot R&B/Hip-Hop Singles & Tracks number ones of 2001
