= List of Billboard Hot 100 top-ten singles in 2001 =

This is a list of singles that charted in the top ten of the Billboard Hot 100 during 2001.

Ja Rule and Destiny's Child each had four top-ten hits in 2001, tying them for the most top-ten hits during the year.

== Top-ten singles ==
Key

- ↑ – indicates single's top 10 entry was also its Hot 100 debut
- † – indicates Best performing song of the year
- (#) – 2001 year-end top 10 single position and rank

List of Billboard Hot 100 top ten singles which peaked in 2001
Top ten entry date	Single	Artist(s)	Peak	Peak date	Weeks in top ten
Singles from 2000
November 18	"The Way You Love Me"	Faith Hill	6	January 13	13
December 2	"It Wasn't Me"	Shaggy featuring Rikrok	1	February 3	16
December 16	"Ms. Jackson"	Outkast	1	February 17	12
December 30	"If You're Gone" (#6)	Matchbox Twenty	5	January 27	10
December 30	"Dance with Me"	Debelah Morgan	8	January 6	3
Singles from 2001
January 6	"Liquid Dreams"	O-Town	10	January 6	1
January 20	"Again" (#9)	Lenny Kravitz	4	February 17	14
January 20	"Love Don't Cost a Thing"	Jennifer Lopez	3	February 24	10
February 3	"Don't Tell Me"	Madonna	4	February 3	8
February 3	"Stutter"	Joe featuring Mystikal	1	February 24	14
February 17	"Angel"	Shaggy featuring Rayvon	1	March 31	14
February 24	"Put It on Me"	Ja Rule featuring Lil' Mo and Vita	8	March 24	7
March 10	"Butterfly"	Crazy Town	1	March 24	8
March 10	"It's Over Now"	112	6	March 17	3
March 10	"Promise"	Jagged Edge	9	March 10	3
March 24	"All for You" (#3)	Janet Jackson	1	April 14	14
March 31	"Thank You" (#8)	Dido	3	April 28	11
March 31	"Survivor"	Destiny's Child	2	April 14	11
March 31	"Get Over Yourself" ↑	Eden's Crush	8	March 31	3
March 31	"Jaded"	Aerosmith	7	April 7	3
April 14	"Missing You"	Case	4	April 28	5
April 14	"Stranger in My House"	Tamia	10	April 14	2
April 21	"Hanging by a Moment" † (#1)	Lifehouse	2	June 16	20
April 28	"Ride wit Me"	Nelly featuring City Spud	3	June 23	12
May 5	"Follow Me"	Uncle Kracker	5	June 9	8
May 5	"Lady Marmalade"	Christina Aguilera, Lil' Kim, Mýa and Pink	1	June 2	12
May 12	"Never Had a Dream Come True"	S Club 7	10	May 12	2
May 19	"What Would You Do?"	City High	8	May 26	4
May 26	"I'm Like a Bird"	Nelly Furtado	9	May 26	1
May 26	"Get Ur Freak On"	Missy Elliott	7	June 30	7
June 2	"Fiesta"	R. Kelly featuring Jay-Z	6	June 23	6
June 9	"My Baby"	Lil' Romeo	3	June 30	5
June 16	"Drops of Jupiter (Tell Me)" (#4)	Train	5	June 23	14
June 16	"Peaches & Cream"	112	4	July 7	8
June 30	"Let Me Blow Ya Mind" (#7)	Eve featuring Gwen Stefani	2	August 18	17
June 30	"There You'll Be"	Faith Hill	10	June 30	1
July 7	"U Remind Me"	Usher	1	July 7	16
July 14	"Hit 'Em Up Style (Oops!)"	Blu Cantrell	2	July 21	16
July 14	"Bootylicious"	Destiny's Child	1	August 4	6
July 14	"Drive"	Incubus	9	July 28	3
July 21	"All or Nothing"	O-Town	3	July 28	6
August 4	"Loverboy"	Mariah Carey featuring Cameo	2	August 4	3
August 4	"Fallin'" (#2)	Alicia Keys	1	August 18	19
August 11	"I'm Real" (#5)	Jennifer Lopez featuring Ja Rule	1	September 8	19
August 11	"Where the Party At"	Jagged Edge featuring Nelly	3	September 15	13
August 25	"It's Been Awhile"	Staind	5	October 20	12
September 1	"Someone to Call My Lover"	Janet Jackson	3	September 1	6
September 22	"Family Affair"	Mary J. Blige	1	November 3	19
September 22	"You Rock My World"	Michael Jackson	10	September 22	1
September 29	"Izzo (H.O.V.A.)"	Jay-Z	8	October 20	5
October 13	"Differences"	Ginuwine	4	October 27	15
October 27	"The Star Spangled Banner"	Whitney Houston	6	October 27	1
October 27	"Hero"	Enrique Iglesias	3	November 17	14
November 3	"Turn Off the Light"	Nelly Furtado	5	November 10	8
November 3	"U Got It Bad"	Usher	1	December 15	20
November 3	"Livin' It Up"	Ja Rule featuring Case	6	December 8	9
November 10	"Only Time"	Enya	10	November 10	3
November 17	"How You Remind Me"	Nickelback	1	December 22	23
December 1	"Emotion"	Destiny's Child	10	December 1	1
December 8	"Get the Party Started"	Pink	4	December 29	12
December 15	"Whenever, Wherever"	Shakira	6	December 29	8

=== 2000 peaks ===
List of Billboard Hot 100 top ten singles in 2001 which peaked in 2000
Top ten entry date	Single	Artist(s)	Peak	Peak date	Weeks in top ten
September 30	"With Arms Wide Open"	Creed	1	November 11	18
November 4	"This I Promise You"	'N Sync	5	December 2	9
November 4	"Independent Women Part I" (#10)	Destiny's Child	1	November 18	17
November 4	"Case of the Ex"	Mýa	2	December 2	13
December 16	"He Loves U Not"	Dream	2	December 30	11

=== 2002 peaks ===
List of Billboard Hot 100 top ten singles in 2001 which peaked in 2002
Top ten entry date	Single	Artist(s)	Peak	Peak date	Weeks in top ten
December 22	"Always on Time"	Ja Rule featuring Ashanti	1	February 23	16
December 29	"My Sacrifice"	Creed	4	February 9	11

== Artists with most top-ten songs ==
List of artists by total songs peaking in the top-ten
Artist	Numbers of songs
Destiny's Child	4
Ja Rule	4
Shaggy	2
Faith Evans	2
112	2
O-Town	2
Jennifer Lopez	2
Jagged Edge	2
Nelly	2
Janet Jackson	2
Jay-Z	2
Nelly Furtado	2
Usher	2
Case	2
Pink	2
Creed	2

== See also ==
- 2001 in music
- List of Billboard Hot 100 number ones of 2001
- Billboard Year-End Hot 100 singles of 2001
