= List of UK R&B Singles Chart number ones of 2001 =

The UK R&B Chart is a weekly chart that ranks the 40 biggest-selling singles and albums that are classified in the R&B genre in the United Kingdom. The chart is compiled by the Official Charts Company, and is based on physical formats. This is a list of the UK's biggest R&B hits of 2001 but erroneously includes tracks from other genres, for example Eminem (Hip hop), Shaggy (Dancehall) and Daniel Bedingfield (UK Garage).

== Number ones ==
Key
†	Best-selling R&B single of the year

Issue date	Single	Artist
7 January	"Stan"	Eminem
14 January ^{[a]}	"Love Don't Cost a Thing"	Jennifer Lopez
21 January	"Love Don't Cost a Thing"	Jennifer Lopez
28 January	"Pop Ya Collar"	Usher
4 February	"Case of the Ex"	Mýa
11 February	"Stutter"	Joe
18 February	"Dance with Me"	Debelah Morgan
25 February	"Ms. Jackson"	Outkast
4 March ^{[a]}	"It Wasn't Me †	Shaggy featuring Rikrok
11 March	"It Wasn't Me †	Shaggy featuring Rikrok
18 March	"It Wasn't Me †	Shaggy featuring Rikrok
25 March	"It Wasn't Me †	Shaggy featuring Rikrok
1 April	"It Wasn't Me †	Shaggy featuring Rikrok
8 April	"It Wasn't Me †	Shaggy featuring Rikrok
15 April	"All for You"	Janet Jackson
22 April	"Survivor"	Destiny's Child
29 April	"Survivor"	Destiny's Child
6 May	"Play"	Jennifer Lopez
13 May	"Ride wit Me"	Nelly featuring City Spud
20 May	"Ride wit Me"	Nelly featuring City Spud
27 May	"No More (Baby I'ma Do Right)"	3LW
3 June ^{[a]}	"Angel"	Shaggy featuring Rayvon
10 June ^{[a]}	"Angel"	Shaggy featuring Rayvon
17 June ^{[a]}	"Angel"	Shaggy featuring Rayvon
24 June ^{[a]}	"Lady Marmalade"	Christina Aguilera, Lil' Kim, Mýa, and Pink
1 July	"Lady Marmalade"	Christina Aguilera, Lil' Kim, Mýa, and Pink
8 July	"Lady Marmalade"	Christina Aguilera, Lil' Kim, Mýa, and Pink
15 July	"Purple Pills"	D12
22 July	"Purple Pills"	D12
29 July	"Bootylicious"	Destiny's Child
5 August	"Bootylicious"	Destiny's Child
12 August	"Ain't It Funny"	Jennifer Lopez
19 August	"Let Me Blow Ya Mind"	Eve featuring Gwen Stefani
26 August	"Let Me Blow Ya Mind"	Eve featuring Gwen Stefani
2 September	"Let Me Blow Ya Mind"	Eve featuring Gwen Stefani
9 September	"Smash Sumthin'"	Redman featuring Adam F
16 September	"Let Me Blow Ya Mind"	Eve featuring Gwen Stefani
23 September	"Area Codes"	Ludacris featuring Nate Dogg
30 September	"What Would You Do?"	City High
7 October	"What Would You Do?"	City High
14 October	"You Rock My World"	Michael Jackson
21 October ^{[a]}	"Because I Got High"	Afroman
28 October ^{[a]}	"Because I Got High"	Afroman
4 November	"Fallin'"	Alicia Keys
11 November	"Fallin'"	Alicia Keys
18 November ^{[a]}	"If You Come Back"	Blue
25 November	"If You Come Back"	Blue
2 December ^{[a]}	"Gotta Get Thru This"	Daniel Bedingfield
9 December ^{[a]}	"Gotta Get Thru This"	Daniel Bedingfield
16 December	"Gotta Get Thru This"	Daniel Bedingfield
23 December	"Gotta Get Thru This"	Daniel Bedingfield
30 December	"Gotta Get Thru This"	Daniel Bedingfield

== Notes ==
- ^{a} - The single was simultaneously number one on the UK Singles Chart.

== See also ==
- List of UK Dance Singles Chart number ones of 2001
- List of UK Independent Singles Chart number ones of 2001
- List of UK Rock & Metal Singles Chart number ones of 2001
- List of UK R&B Albums Chart number ones of 2001
