= Caramel (City High song) =

2001 single by City High

Single by City High featuring Eve

from the album City High
- Released: September 11, 2001
- Studio: Trackhouse, Booga Basement (New Jersey, US); The Hit Factory (New York City)
- Length: 3:32
- Label: Interscope; Booga Basement
- Songwriters: Ryan Toby; Giscard Xavier; Jerry Duplessis; Robbie Pardlo; Tarik Collins; Leonard Hubbard; Scott Storch; Ahmir Thompson
- Producers: Jerry "Wonda" Duplessis; Ryan Toby; Jee Eye Zee

City High singles chronology
"What Would You Do?" (2001)	"Caramel" (2001)	"City High Anthem" (2002)

Eve singles chronology
"Let Me Blow Ya Mind" (2001)	"Caramel" (2001)	"4 My People" (2002)

Music video
- "Caramel" on YouTube

"Caramel" is a song by American hip hop trio City High, released as the second single from their self-titled debut album (2001). The single, released on September 11, 2001, features American rapper Eve. Produced by Jerry "Wonda" Duplessis, "Caramel" is the group's second-highest charting single, peaking at number 18 on the US Billboard Hot 100 and number nine on the Billboard Hot R&B/Hip-Hop Singles & Tracks chart in January 2002. The track interpolates the song "Silent Treatment" by the Roots.

== Music video ==
A music video was produced for "Caramel" that begins with the original version and transitions into the Trackmasters remix version. It begins with a shot of Ryan Toby and Robbie Pardlo on a computer that shows the words "Dream Girl 2001". It then cuts to a shot of Claudette Ortiz singing the first verse, and then the trio is dancing at a party as Ortiz sings. The video continues switching from Ortiz singing on a couch, the trio at the party, and Ortiz boxing Zab Judah. As the third verse, the first not sung by Ortiz, begins, it features the guys in a car. The video switches to Eve on a motorcycle and starting her rap. The video ends with Toby and Pardlo still in front of the computer, watching the video.

== Track listings ==
US 12-inch single

A1. "Caramel" (LP version featuring Eve) – 3:47
A2. "Caramel" (LP version featuring Eve acappella) – 3:22
A3. "Caramel" (LP version instrumental) – 3:55
B1. "Caramel" (Trackmasters Joint) – 3:46
B2. "Caramel" (Trackmasters Joint instrumental) – 3:46
B3. "Caramel" (LP version) – 3:55

UK CD single

1. "Caramel" (video version)
2. "Caramel" (Trackmasters Joint)
3. "Caramel" (LP version)
4. "Caramel" (Saqib remix)
5. "Caramel" (CD-ROM video featuring Eve)

UK 12-inch single

A1. "Caramel" (video version) – 3:33
A2. "Caramel" (Trackmasters Joint) – 3:40
B1. "Caramel" (LP version) – 3:30
B2. "Caramel" (Saqib remix) – 4:31

European CD single

1. "Caramel" (LP version) – 3:34
2. Excerpts from City High – 8:49

Australian CD single

1. "Caramel" (LP version featuring Eve) – 3:34
2. "Caramel" (Trackmasters Joint) – 3:41
3. "Caramel" (Saqib remix) – 4:32
4. Excerpts from City High – 8:49
5. "Caramel" (video)

== Credits and personnel ==
Credits are taken from the City High liner notes and the UK CD single.

Studios

- Recorded at Trackhouse Recording Studios and Booga Basement Studio (New Jersey, US)
- Single version recorded at The Hit Factory (New York City)
- Mixed and mastered at The Hit Factory (New York City)

Personnel

- Ryan Toby – writing, production, vocal arrangement and production
- Giscard Xavier – writing
- Jerry "Wonda" Duplessis – writing (as Jerry Duplessis), production
- Robby Pardlo – writing, production (single version)
- Tarik Collins – writing (single version)
- Leonard Hubbard – writing (single version)
- Scott Storch – writing (single version)
- Ahmir Thompson – writing (single version)
- Eve – featured vocals
- Jee Eye Zee – production
- Andy Grassi – mixing, engineering
- Joe Yannece – mastering

== Charts ==
=== Weekly charts ===
Chart (2001–2002)	Peak position
Australia (ARIA)	47
Australian Urban (ARIA)	10
Belgium (Ultratop 50 Flanders)	47
Europe (Eurochart Hot 100)	50
Germany (GfK)	70
Ireland (IRMA)	21
Netherlands (Dutch Top 40 Tipparade)	5
Netherlands (Single Top 100)	53
Scotland Singles (OCC)	16
Switzerland (Schweizer Hitparade)	72
UK Singles (OCC)	9
UK Hip Hop/R&B (OCC)	1
US Billboard Hot 100	18
US Hot R&B/Hip-Hop Singles & Tracks (Billboard)	9
US Mainstream Top 40 (Billboard)	12
US Rhythmic Top 40 (Billboard)	3

=== Year-end charts ===
Chart (2001)	Position
US Rhythmic Top 40 (Billboard)	77

Chart (2002)	Position
UK Singles (OCC)	134
UK Urban (Music Week)	30
US Billboard Hot 100	72
US Hot R&B/Hip-Hop Singles & Tracks (Billboard)	88
US Mainstream Top 40 (Billboard)	49
US Rhythmic Top 40 (Billboard)	34

== Release history ==
Region	Date	Format(s)	Label(s)	Ref.
United States	September 11, 2001	Rhythmic contemporary; urban radio	Interscope; Booga Basement	
United States	November 13, 2001	Contemporary hit radio	Interscope; Booga Basement	
Australia	February 11, 2002	CD	Interscope; Booga Basement	
United Kingdom	March 4, 2002	12-inch vinyl; CD; cassette	Interscope; Booga Basement	
