= City High (album) =

Studio album by City High
- Released: May 22, 2001
- Genre: R&B
- Length: 55:26
- Label: Interscope
- Producers: Clark Kent; Salaam Remi; Ryan Toby; Wyclef Jean; Jerry Duplessis

Singles from City High
- 1. "What Would You Do?" Released: March 27, 2001; 2. "Caramel" Released: September 11, 2001; 3. "City High Anthem" Released: February 25, 2002

City High is the only studio album by contemporary R&B trio City High. It was released by Interscope Records on May 22, 2001 in the United States.

== Background ==
The group began as Robbie Pardlo signing as a solo artist. However, producers decided the album should feature a two-man group, and Pardlo's high school friend Ryan Toby soon joined. The two-man group began work on an album. In an effort to stand out from similar duo acts, like The Product G&B, producers decided to add a female member. They chose Claudette Ortiz, a schoolmate from Pardlo and Toby's high school.

During production, all three members participated in writing songs for the album, though Toby did most of the writing, and Pardlo did most of the production, given that Ortiz was just 16 years old. The trio focused on lyrics that told a story, Toby noting inspiration from country music. Much of the album's lyrical content is based on the trio's real-life experiences, such as the song "What Would You Do?" and the story it tells.

== Promotion ==
"What Would You Do?," the album's lead single, was featured on the soundtrack to the March 1999 film Life. However, the track was not formally released as a single until March 2001. It became City High's breakthrough hit, peaking at number eight on the US Billboard Hot 100, number one on the Hot Rap Singles chart, number 13 on the Hot R&B/Hip-Hop Singles & Tracks chart, and number three on the UK Singles Chart. It would remain the group's highest-charting and most successful single, and received a Grammy Award nomination for Best R&B Performance by a Duo or Group. Follow-up single "Caramel" also achieved commercial success, reaching number 18 on the Billboard Hot 100 and number nine on the Hot R&B/Hip-Hop Singles & Tracks chart. The album's third and final single, "City High Anthem," failed to chart.

== Critical reception ==
Professional ratings
Review scores
Source	Rating
AllMusic	4/5 stars
MTV Asia	7/10
Q	4/5 stars
Rolling Stone	3.5/5 stars
RTÉ Entertainment	4/5 stars
Vibe	3/5
The Village Voice	A−

The album received generally favorable reviews. Jon Azpiri of AllMusic described City High as "an impressive debut to build on," praising the group's blend of "hip-hop rhythms with butter-smooth R&B vocals." He also highlighted Robby Pardlo's "impressive tenor voice" and wrote that Pardlo's vocals alongside Ryan Toby's rhymes "show just where R&B may be going in the years to come." Rolling Stone's Jon Caramanica wrote that, although "today's bling-tastic R&B usually avoids social commentary", City High's debut "hinges on thick, stomp-worthy funk, luxurious soul grooves and plaintive harmonies about messy modern love." HipHopDX called the album as a "semi-polished, but very promising debut." He praised the group's socially conscious songs such as "Why" and "What Would You Do" while noting that some tracks felt underdeveloped, ultimately concluding that the album showcased both the trio's ballad-driven style and their versatility.

Sheng Yuen of MTV Asia gave City High a rating of 7/10, praising the trio for "successfully infusing their catchy compositions with gutsy reality-based topics" and highlighting the album's empathetic portrayals of disenfranchised youth. Yuen also suggested that the group's evolving identity could become a challenge in an industry that "is inclined towards favoring clearer stereotypes," while concluding that City High appeared poised to serve as "ambassadors for Generation Y." RTE Entertainment's John Raftery called City High a "classy album" that "stands out from the crowd." Q magazine said that "few have managed to capture the original Fugee spirit like City High". In a mixed review, Maurice Bottomley of PopMatters felt that some songs have poor lyrical content, including "City High Anthem"'s "collection of clichés beyond any chance of redemption", and said that "15 Will Get You 20" is "catchy to the point of irritation."

== Commercial performance ==
City High achieved moderate commercial success. In the United States, it peaked at number 34 on the Billboard 200 and number 23 on the Top R&B/Hip-Hop Albums chart. Internationally, the album reached number 11 in New Zealand, number 55 in Canada, number 82 in Germany, and number 89 on the UK Albums Chart, while also peaking at number 14 on the UK R&B Albums Chart. In the United States, City High was certified Gold by the Recording Industry Association of America (RIAA) on September 13, 2001, signifying shipments of over 500,000 copies.

== Track listing ==
City High track listing
No.	Title	Writer(s)	Producer(s)	Length
1.	"Didn't Ya"	Ryan Toby; Salaam Remi	Remi; Toby^{[a]}	3:45
2.	"Three Way"	Toby; Vidal Davis	Davis; Toby^{[a]}	3:30
3.	"Why"	Toby; Robby Pardlo	Wyclef Jean; Jerry Duplessis; Toby^{[a]}	3:32
4.	"Song for You"	Leon Russell	Jean; Duplessis	4:35
5.	"15 Will Get You 20"	Jean; Lethel Brooks; R. Franklin	DJ Clark Kent; Brooks^{[a]}	3:30
6.	"Cats and Dogs"	Roby; Pardlo; Claudette Ortiz; Jean; Duplessis	Jean; Duplessis	3:30
7.	"Caramel"	Toby; Pardlo; Duplessis; Giscard Xavier	Duplessis; Toby; Jee Eye Zee	3:35
8.	"Best Friends"	Toby; Pardlo; Walter Gilmore; Gerard Avant	Toby; Pardlo; Gilmore; Avant	4:50
9.	"Sista"	Toby; Andre Harris	Dre & Vidal; Toby^{[a]}	3:51
10.	"What Would You Do?"	Toby; Pardlo; Brian Bailey; Calvin Broadus; Andre Young	Jean; Duplessis; Toby; Pardlo	2:54
11.	"So Many Things"	Pardlo; Duplessis	Duplessis; Pardlo; Avant	4:08
12.	"The Only One I Trust"	Toby; Pardlo; Jerrell Battle; Avant	Duplessis; Pardlo; Toby; Avant	4:17
13.	"City High Anthem"	Toby; Pardlo; Ortiz	Pardlo; Toby	5:19
14.	"You Don't Know Me"	Pardlo; Tim Dickson; Terill Paul	Jean; Duplessis	4:10

UK bonus track edition
No.	Title	Writer(s)	Producer(s)	Length
15.	"Do the Right Thing"	Toby; Pardlo; Ortiz	Pardlo; Toby	4:46
16.	"It Ain't the Same"	Toby; Dave "X" Haulsey; Christopher Wallace; Kevin Scott; Dominique Owens	Toby; Haulsey	3:37

Bonus track edition
No.	Title	Writer(s)	Producer(s)	Length
15.	"Caramel" (Trackmasters remix featuring Eve)	Toby; Pardlo; Duplessis; Xavier; Eve Jeffers	Duplessis; Toby; Jee Eye Zee; Trackmasters^{[b]}	3:40

Notes

- ^{^[a]} signifies vocal producer(s)
- ^{^[b]} signifies additional producer(s)
- The 2002 reissue features a different tracklist with a different running order and replaces the original version of "Caramel" with the single remix version.

Sample credits

- "Caramel" contains an interpolation from "Silent Treatment" as performed by The Roots.
- "What Would You Do?" contains a sample from "The Next Episode" by Dr. Dre and Snoop Dogg.
- "It Ain't the Same" contains elements from "Things Done Changed" as performed by The Notorious B.I.G..

== Personnel ==
- Kwaku Alston – photography
- Gerard Avant – producer
- Ron Banks – mixing
- Vidal Davis – producer, engineer
- Jerry Duplessis – producer, executive producer, mixing
- Jason Dyer – mixing assistant
- Serban Ghenea – mixing
- Andy Grassi – engineer, mixing
- Andre Harris – producer
- Wyclef Jean – producer, executive producer, mixing
- Carlton Jones – stylist
- Clark Kent – producer, mixing
- Sonny Kompanek – string arrangements
- Alex Ndione – mixing
- Robbie Pardlo – producer, engineer, executive producer, mixing, vocals
- Salaam Remi – producer, engineer, vocal arrangement, mixing, vocal producer
- Ryan Toby – producer, engineer, executive producer, vocal arrangement, mixing, vocal producer, vocals
- Joe Yannece – mastering
- Claudette Ortiz – producer, vocals
- Cus – mixing

== Charts ==
=== Weekly charts ===
Weekly chart performance for City High
Chart (2001–2002)	Peak position
Canadian Albums (Nielsen SoundScan)	55
German Albums (Offizielle Top 100)	82
New Zealand Albums (RMNZ)	11
UK Albums (Official Charts)	89
UK R&B Albums (Official Charts)	14
US Billboard 200	34
US Top R&B/Hip-Hop Albums (Billboard)	23

=== Year-end charts ===
Year-end chart performance for City High
Chart (2001)	Position
Canadian R&B Albums (Nielsen SoundScan)	50
US Billboard 200	136

== Certifications ==
Certifications for City High
Region	Certification	Certified units/sales
United States (RIAA)	Gold	500,000^{^}
^{^} Shipments figures based on certification alone.
