= Ring the Alarm (album) =

Studio album by Philly's Most
- Released: June 15, 2004
- Recorded: 2003–2004
- Genre: Hip hop
- Length: 39:36
- Label: Universal
- Producer: Brian Kidd; C4; Dre & Vidal; Felony Muzik; She'kspere

Philly's Most chronology
Get Down or Lay Down (2001)	Ring the Alarm (2004)

Singles from Ring the Alarm
- 1. "Ring the Alarm" Released: 2004

Professional ratings
Review scores
Source	Rating
AllMusic	2/5 stars
HipHopDX	3.5/5
RapReviews	5.5/10

Ring the Alarm is the second and final studio album by American hip hop duo Philly's Most Wanted (shortened to Philly's Most). It was released on June 15, 2004, via Universal Records. The album was produced by Dre & Vidal, C4, Kevin "She'kspere" Briggs, Felony Muzik, and Brian Kidd, with Kedar Massenburg, Boo-Bonic, and Mr. Man serving as executive producers. It features guest appearances from Black Thought, Marsha Ambrosius, and Ryan Toby.

The album was poorly promoted and only reached number 70 on the US Billboard Top R&B/Hip-Hop Albums chart. Its only single, also titled "Ring the Alarm", reached No. 66 on the Hot R&B/Hip-Hop Singles Sales chart. Philly's Most Wanted disbanded with no further releases.

== Track listing ==
No.	Title	Producer(s)	Length
1.	"Intro (LXG)"	C4	2:45
2.	"Away from Here" (featuring Black Thought)	Dre & Vidal	4:25
3.	"Ring the Alarm"	Kevin "She'kspere" Briggs	3:46
4.	"Most Wanted Shit (Pimp Cup)"	C4	3:57
5.	"Old Head" (Skit)		0:22
6.	"Dust Ya Boots"	Brian Kidd	3:50
7.	"So Much Trouble (Street Money)"	Dre & Vidal; Felony Muzik (co.)	3:30
8.	"Pimp in Distress"	Dre & Vidal	1:53
9.	"My Baby" (featuring Ryan Toby)	Dre & Vidal	3:38
10.	"Memory Lane"	C4	3:38
11.	"Point a Chick Out" (featuring Marsha Ambrosius)	Kevin "She'kspere" Briggs	4:18
12.	"Clutch Shooters"	Felony Muzik	3:34
Total length:			39:36

== Charts ==
Chart (2004)	Peak position
US Top R&B/Hip-Hop Albums (Billboard)	70
