= Still Walkin' =

Studio album by Coo Coo Cal
- Released: May 14, 2002
- Recorded: 2000–2002
- Genre: Midwestern hip hop, gangsta rap
- Label: Infinite
- Producer: Bigg Hank; Dre

Coo Coo Cal chronology
Disturbed (2001)	Still Walkin' (2002)	All or Nothin (2004)

Still Walkin' is the fourth album by Coo Coo Cal, released on May 14, 2002 through Infinite Records. Most of the album was produced by Bigg Hank, though a then-unknown Andre "Dre" Lyon (of the production duo Cool & Dre) contributed production for two of the album's 20 tracks.

Released less than a year after his major-label debut, Disturbed and his breakthrough single "My Projects", Cal had parted ways with Tommy Boy Records and quickly self-released Still Walkin'. The album peak3: at number 30 on the Billboard Top R&B/Hip-Hop Albums and 17 on the Top Independent Albums; it remains his last charting album.

== Track listing ==
1. "Intro" - 1:54
2. "Why They Call Him Crazy" - 4:03
3. "Ghetto 2 Ghetto" - 4:14 (featuring Outlawz and Mr. Do It To Death)
4. "You Got Me Fuck Up" - 4:30
5. "Skit" - 1:28
6. "Stealing Hoes" - 4:13
7. "Eyes of the Smooth One" - 3:36
8. "Skit" - 0:41
9. "Bad to the Bone" - 3:05
10. "Dealing with a Mob" - 3:32
11. "Ride Till We Die" - 4:15 (featuring Twista)
12. "Fuck Your Vest" - 3:39
13. "I Remember" - 3:40
14. "No Mercy" - 4:58
15. "Skit" - 1:15
16. "Game Still Recognize Game" - 5:40
17. "Get Down or Lay Down" - 7:32
18. "Coke Cola Oznola" - 3:40
19. "Bad Ass Bitch" - 1:29
20. Untitled - 1:55

== Chart history ==
Chart (2002)	Peak position
Billboard Top R&B/Hip-Hop Albums	30
Billboard Top Independent Albums	17
