= List of Hot R&B/Hip-Hop Singles & Tracks number ones of 2001 =

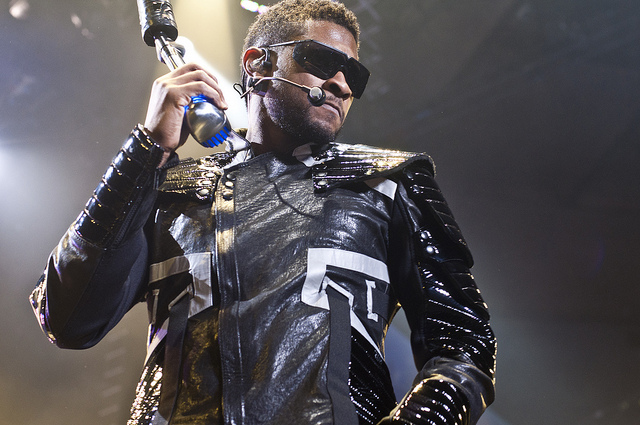
Usher (pictured in 2010) had two number ones in 2001.

These are the Billboard R&B singles chart number-one singles of 2001.

== Chart history ==
Key
†	Indicates best-charting R&B single of 2001

Issue Date	Song	Artist
January 6	"Independent Women Part I"	Destiny's Child
January 13	"I Just Wanna Luv U (Give It 2 Me)"	Jay-Z
January 20	"I Just Wanna Luv U (Give It 2 Me)"	Jay-Z
January 27	"Danger (Been So Long)"	Mystikal featuring Nivea
February 3	"Ms. Jackson"	OutKast
February 10	"Stutter"	Joe featuring Mystikal
February 17	"Stutter"	Joe featuring Mystikal
February 24	"Stutter"	Joe featuring Mystikal
March 3	"Stutter"	Joe featuring Mystikal
March 10	"Stutter"	Joe featuring Mystikal
March 17	"It's Over Now"	112
March 24	"It's Over Now"	112
March 31	"Promise"	Jagged Edge
April 7	"Promise"	Jagged Edge
April 14	"All for You"	Janet Jackson
April 21	"All for You"	Janet Jackson
April 28	"Missing You"	Case
May 5	"Missing You"	Case
May 12	"Missing You"	Case
May 19	"Missing You"	Case
May 26	"My Baby"	Lil' Romeo
June 2	"Fiesta" †	R. Kelly featuring Jay-Z
June 9	"Fiesta" †	R. Kelly featuring Jay-Z
June 16	"Fiesta" †	R. Kelly featuring Jay-Z
June 23	"Fiesta" †	R. Kelly featuring Jay-Z
June 30	"Fiesta" †	R. Kelly featuring Jay-Z
July 7	"U Remind Me"	Usher
July 14	"U Remind Me"	Usher
July 21	"U Remind Me"	Usher
July 28	"U Remind Me"	Usher
August 4	"Loverboy"	Mariah Carey featuring Da Brat and Ludacris
August 11	"Loverboy"	Mariah Carey featuring Da Brat and Ludacris
August 18	"Fallin'"	Alicia Keys
August 25	"Fallin'"	Alicia Keys
September 1	"Fallin'"	Alicia Keys
September 8	"Fallin'"	Alicia Keys
September 15	"Where the Party At"	Jagged Edge with Nelly
September 22	"Where the Party At"	Jagged Edge with Nelly
September 29	"Where the Party At"	Jagged Edge with Nelly
October 6	"Differences"	Ginuwine
October 13	"Differences"	Ginuwine
October 20	"Differences"	Ginuwine
October 27	"Differences"	Ginuwine
November 3	"Family Affair"	Mary J. Blige
November 10	"Family Affair"	Mary J. Blige
November 17	"U Got It Bad"	Usher
November 24	"U Got It Bad"	Usher
December 1	"U Got It Bad"	Usher
December 8	"U Got It Bad"	Usher
December 15	"U Got It Bad"	Usher
December 22	"U Got It Bad"	Usher
December 29	"U Got It Bad"	Usher

== See also ==
- 2001 in music
- Billboard Year-End Hot R&B/Hip-Hop Singles & Tracks of 2001
- List of number-one R&B hits (United States)
