= Cross the Border =

2000 single by Philly's Most Wanted

Single by Philly's Most Wanted

from the album Get Down or Lay Down
- Released: October 10, 2000
- Genre: Hip-hop
- Length: 4:14
- Label: Atlantic
- Songwriters: Al Holly; Joel Witherspoon; Pharrell Williams; Charles Hugo
- Producer: The Neptunes

Philly's Most Wanted singles chronology
"Y'all Can't Never Hurt Us" (2000)	"Cross the Border" (2000)	"Please Don't Mind" (2001)

Music video
- "Cross the Border" on YouTube

"Cross the Border" is a song by American hip-hop duo Philly's Most Wanted. It was released on October 10, 2000 via Atlantic Records as the second single from the duo's debut studio album Get Down or Lay Down. Written by members Boo-Bonic and Mr. Man together with Pharrell Williams and Chad Hugo, it was produced by the latter two.

The song peaked at number 98 on the Billboard Hot 100, number 50 on the Hot R&B/Hip-Hop Songs, number 71 on the R&B/Hip-Hop Airplay, number 3 on the Hot Rap Songs, number 37 on the Rhythmic Airplay and number 7 on the Hot R&B/Hip-Hop Singles Sales in the United States. It was one of Billboard magazine's top rap songs of 2001, taking the seventh spot on Billboard Year-End Hot Rap Singles of 2001

An accompanying music video was directed by Jeremy Rall.

== Track listing ==
No.	Title	Writer(s)	Length
1.	"Cross the Border" (Album Version)	Al Holly; Joel Witherspoon; Pharrell Williams; Chad Hugo
2.	"Cross the Border" (Clean)	Holly; Witherspoon; Williams; Hugo
3.	"Cross the Border" (Instrumental)	Williams; Hugo
4.	"Suckas, Pt. 2 (For da Gangsta's)" (Album Version)	Holly; Witherspoon; Dwight Grant; Williams; Hugo
5.	"Suckas, Pt. 2 (For da Gangsta's)" (Clean)	Holly; Witherspoon; Grant; Williams; Hugo
6.	"Suckas, Pt. 2 (For da Gangsta's)" (Instrumental)	Williams; Hugo

== Charts ==
=== Weekly charts ===
Chart (2000)	Peak position
US Billboard Hot 100	98
US Hot R&B/Hip-Hop Songs (Billboard)	50
US R&B/Hip-Hop Airplay (Billboard)	71
US Hot Rap Songs (Billboard)	3
US Rhythmic Airplay (Billboard)	37

=== Year-end charts ===
Chart (2001)	Position
Billboard Hot 100 Singles Sales	65
Billboard Hot R&B/Hip-Hop Singles Sales	32
Billboard Hot Rap Singles	7
