= Get Down or Lay Down =

Studio album by Philly's Most Wanted
- Released: August 7, 2001
- Recorded: 1999–2001
- Studio: Mastersound Studios (Virginia Beach, VA); Suave Spot (Atlanta, GA); Quad Recording Studios (New York, NY); The Weight Room (New York, NY); Right Track Studios (New York, NY); The Cutting Room (New York, NY); Soundtrack Studios (New York, NY)
- Genre: Hip hop
- Length: 1:07:21
- Label: Atlantic
- Producer: Epitome; Just Blaze; The Neptunes; T-Mix

Philly's Most Wanted chronology
Get Down or Lay Down (2001)	Ring the Alarm (2004)

Singles from Get Down or Lay Down
- 1. "Y'All Can't Never Hurt Us" Released: 2000; 2. "Cross the Border" Released: 2000; 3. "Please Don't Mind" Released: 2001

Professional ratings
Review scores
Source	Rating
AllMusic	3/5 stars
RapReviews	7/10

Get Down or Lay Down is the debut studio album by American hip hop duo Philly's Most Wanted. It was released on August 7, 2001, through Atlantic Records. The recording sessions took place at Mastersound Studios in Virginia Beach, Suave Spot in Atlanta, and Quad Recording Studios, The Weight Room, Right Track Studios, The Cutting Room, and Soundtrack Studios in New York. The album was produced by the Neptunes, Epitome, T-Mix, and Just Blaze. It features guest appearances from the Clipse, Dre Boogie, Fabolous, and Pharrell Williams.

The album debuted at number 69 on the Billboard 200 and number 20 on the Top R&B/Hip-Hop Albums charts in the United States. Its lead single, "Y'all Can't Never Hurt Us", reached number 13 on the Hot Rap Songs chart. The second single off of the album, "Cross the Border", made it to number 98 on the Billboard Hot 100, number 50 on the Hot R&B/Hip-Hop Songs and number 3 on the Hot Rap Songs, becoming the duo's biggest hit. The third and final single, "Please Don't Mind", peaked at number 48 on the Hot R&B/Hip-Hop Songs and number 12 on the Hot Rap Songs.

== Track listing ==
No.	Title	Writer(s)	Producer(s)	Length
1.	"Radikal"	Pharrell Williams; Chad Hugo; Al Holly; Joel Witherspoon	The Neptunes	4:04
2.	"Y'all Can't Never Hurt Us"	Holly; Witherspoon; Tristan Jones	T-Mix	4:03
3.	"Suckas"	Williams; Hugo; Holly; Witherspoon	The Neptunes	3:52
4.	"Pretty Tony"	Witherspoon	The Neptunes	2:16
5.	"Please Don't Mind" (featuring Andre Wilson)	Williams; Hugo; Holly; Witherspoon	The Neptunes	4:00
6.	"Philly Celebrities"	Williams; Hugo; Holly; Witherspoon	The Neptunes	4:07
7.	"Ladies Choice"	Williams; Hugo; Holly; Witherspoon	The Neptunes	4:40
8.	"The Question"	Robert Taylor; Williams; Hugo; Holly; Witherspoon	Epitome	0:50
9.	"Cross the Border"	Williams; Hugo; Holly; Witherspoon	The Neptunes	4:14
10.	"Dream Car (Do You Wanna Ride)" (featuring Pharrell Williams)	Williams; Hugo; Holly; Witherspoon	The Neptunes	3:43
11.	"The Reason"		Epitome	1:24
12.	"What Makes Me"	Taylor; Witherspoon; Holly; Keenan Edwards	Epitome; Nance Nickels (co.)	4:38
13.	"Suckas, Pt. 2 (For da Gangsta's)"	Williams; Hugo; Holly; Witherspoon; Dwight Grant	The Neptunes	4:02
14.	"The Game"	Holly; Witherspoon; Jones	T-Mix	5:28
15.	"Piece of the Pie"		Epitome	2:41
16.	"Street Tax" (featuring the Clipse)	Williams; Hugo; Holly; Witherspoon	The Neptunes	4:12
17.	"This Bitch"	Justin Smith; Holly; Witherspoon; Lionel Evans	Just Blaze	5:32
18.	"Cross the Border (J.B.M. Remix)" (featuring Terrar and Fabolous)	Williams; Hugo; Holly; Witherspoon; John Jackson	The Neptunes	3:35
Total length:				1:07:21

== Charts ==
Chart (2001)	Peak position
US Billboard 200	69
US Top R&B/Hip-Hop Albums (Billboard)	20
