= Disturbed (album) =

Studio album by Coo Coo Cal
- Released: September 18, 2001
- Recorded: 2001
- Studios: Infinite Recording Studios (Milwaukee, WI); Divine Mill Studios (Newark, NJ); Trax 52 Recording Studio (Milwaukee, WI)
- Genre: Hip hop
- Length: 1:04:15
- Label: Tommy Boy
- Producers: Bigg Hank; Bink!; Cipha Sounds; Double 8; Eric "Rated X" Phillips; KayGee

Coo Coo Cal chronology
Walkin' Dead (1999)	Disturbed (2001)	Still Walkin' (2002)

Singles from Disturbed
- 1. "My Projects" Released: May 22, 2001

Professional ratings
Review scores
Source	Rating
AllMusic	2/5 stars
NME	3.5/5 stars

Disturbed is the third album by American rapper Coo Coo Cal. It was released on September 18, 2001, through Tommy Boy Records. Production was mostly handled by Bigg Hank, though Rated X, Bink!, DJ Cipha Sounds, Double 8 and KayGee also contributed production to the album. It features guest appearances from Midwikid, Mr. Do It To Death, Gage, Koffee Brown, Lil' Niq, Mocha, Nothing Typical, Twista, Indo G, Kurupt and Trick Daddy.

The album found mild success in the United States, reaching 45 on the Billboard 200, number 15 on the Top R&B/Hip-Hop Albums and number one on the Independent Albums. Its lead single, "My Projects", made it to number 81 on the Billboard Hot 100, number 22 on the Hot R&B/Hip-Hop Songs and topped the Hot Rap Songs chart in the US.

== Track listing ==
No.	Title	Writer(s)	Producer(s)	Length
1.	"Intro"			1:24
2.	"My Projects"	Calvin Bellamy; Henry Cook	Bigg Hank	3:45
3.	"I Did It Again"	Bellamy; Cook	Bigg Hank	3:52
4.	"How Does It Feel to Ya" (featuring Koffee Brown and Midwikid)	Bellamy; Donald Robinson; Brandon Daniel; Keir Gist; Eric Phillips; Clarence Alexander Scarborough	KayGee; Rated X	4:08
5.	"Sick and Tired"	Bellamy; Cook	Bigg Hank	3:53
6.	"Something Something"	Bellamy; Cook	Bigg Hank	3:59
7.	"Dedication" (featuring Mr. Do It To Death)	Bellamy; Radontae Ashford; Cook	Bigg Hank	4:28
8.	"Freak Nasty"	Bellamy; Crystal Johnson; Roosevelt Harrell	Bink!	4:11
9.	"Still Ride Till We Die" (featuring Twista)	Bellamy; Carl Mitchell; Phillips; Luis Diaz	Rated X; Cipha Sounds	5:24
10.	"Ghetto Dreaming"	Bellamy; Cook	Bigg Hank	4:07
11.	"Wanna Be a G" (featuring Midwikid)	Bellamy; Robinson; Daniel; Cook	Bigg Hank	4:11
12.	"My Mind Is Gone"	Bellamy; Cook	Bigg Hank	3:16
13.	"Disturbed" (featuring Nothing Typical)	Bellamy; D. Burks; J. Collins; F. Sensaborough V; B. Smith; Cook	Bigg Hank	3:57
14.	"Do You Wanna Ride" (featuring Mocha and Mr. Do It To Death)	Bellamy; Aleesha Richards; Ashford; Cook	Bigg Hank	4:39
15.	"Still in the Game" (featuring Gage and Lil' Niq)	Bellamy; Thomas Kinlow; Justin Jackson; Latare Nixon	Double 8	4:09
16.	"My Projects (Remix)" (featuring Trick Daddy, Kurupt and Indo G)	Bellamy; Maurice Young; Ricardo Brown; Tobian Tools; Cook; Phillips; Diaz	Bigg Hank	4:52
Total length:				1:04:15

== Chart history ==
Chart (2001)	Peak position
US Billboard 200	45
US Top R&B/Hip-Hop Albums (Billboard)	15
US Independent Albums (Billboard)	1
