= Coo Coo Cal =

American rapper

- Born: Calvin Bellamy; Milwaukee, Wisconsin, U.S.
- Genre: Milwaukee hip-hop
- Occupation: Rapper
- Years active: 1996–present
- Labels: Tommy Boy; F.U.P. MOB; Suave House; Infinite; Tone Struck Entertainment
- Website: Official website

Calvin Bellamy, known professionally as Coo Coo Cal, is an American rapper from Milwaukee, Wisconsin. He is best known for his 2001 single "My Projects", which peaked atop the Billboard Hot Rap Songs chart and entered the Billboard Hot 100.

Coo Coo Cal's debut album, Game (1996), was self-released by In The Trunk Records. Cal's sophomore album, Walkin' Dead (1999), was released by Infinite Recordings. His third album, Disturbed (2001), was released by Tommy Boy Entertainment and spawned the single "My Projects".

After leaving Tommy Boy in 2002, Cal released a follow-up to Walkin' Dead entitled Still Walkin'. A fifth album, All or Nothin', followed in 2004. In 2018, Coo Coo Cal returned to release a new single, "Home", on Tone Struck Entertainment and a tell-all documentary.

== Discography ==
=== Albums ===
Year	Album	Peak chart positions	
Year	Album	U.S.	U.S. R&B
1996	Game: Released: 1996; Label: In The Trunk	–	–
1999	Walkin' Dead: Released: November 9, 1999; Label: Infinite	–	–
2001	Disturbed: Released: September 18, 2001; Label: Tommy Boy	45	15
2002	Still Walkin': Released: May 14, 2002; Label: Infinite	–	30
2004	All or Nothin': Released: April 6, 2004; Label: 33rd Street	–	–

=== Singles ===
Year	Song	Chart positions		
Year	Song	Billboard Hot 100	Hot R&B/Hip-Hop Singles & Tracks	Hot Rap Singles
2001	"My Projects"	#81	#22	#1
