= Philly's Most Wanted =

American hip hop group

- Also known as: Philly's Most
- Origin: Philadelphia, Pennsylvania, United States
- Genres: Hip-Hop
- Years active: 1999–2004
- Labels: Atlantic, Universal
- Members: Boo-Bonic aka Bonic; Mr. Man

Philly's Most Wanted was an American hip hop duo composed of Al Baseer "Boo-Bonic" Holly and Joel "Mr. Man" Witherspoon. The duo broke into the music business with a huge street buzz. That was early in the mid 1990’s coming out of Southwest Philadelphia, Pennsylvania. The duo would then begin Ghost writing and featuring on albums like the Fugees member Pra’s album titled “Ghetto Superstars” also the movie “Slam” soundtrack. A few years earlier the duo would meet Rapper “Jay-Z” which he offered them a deal a few months after his first album release titled “Reasonable Doubt” to sign with Roc-A-fella records. At the time the Group was offered multiple record deals, but made the choice at the time to sign with Atlantic Records. Even though choosing Atlantic Records the duo maintained a great relationship with Roc-A-Fella records. So that’s how Beanie Sigel was introduced to the world as we now know. The duo then became affiliates of production duo, The Neptunes. who then introduced Pharrell Williams to Jay-Z one day at Sony studios in Manhattan, New York, NY.

The duo signed with Atlantic Records in 1999 and issued their first two singles, "Y'all Can't Never Hurt Us" “Suckas” and then “Cross the Border" soon after. The latter song peaked on the Billboard Hot 100 and 3 on the Billboard Hot Rap Singles. Their debut album, Get Down or Lay Down, however, was delayed for over a year, finally being released on August 7, 2001. With the production from The Neptunes, Just Blaze and Epitome. Their final single “Please Don’t Mind” also peaked on the Billboard charts at the album was received well by fans. only reaching the Billboard 200 even with BET refusing to support their video for Cross the Border.

After the album’s release and lack of support from the label the group made a decision to part ways with Atlantic Records, the duo shortened their name to Philly's Most due to copyright concerns and released a second album entitled Ring the Alarm in 2004 before disbanding shortly after. Today Boo Bonic (Boo) makes artwork, while Mr.Man Appears in interviews

== Discography ==
=== Albums ===
Year	Album	Peak chart positions	
Year	Album	U.S.	U.S. R&B
2001	Get Down or Lay Down: Released: August 7, 2001; Label: Atlantic	69	20
2004	Ring the Alarm: Released: June 15, 2004; Label: Universal	–	70

=== Singles ===
Year	Single	Chart positions			Album
Year	Single	U.S. Hot 100	U.S. R&B	U.S. Rap	Album
2000	"Cross the Border"	98	50	3	Get Down or Lay Down
2000	"Y'all Can't Never Hurt Us"	–	–	13	Get Down or Lay Down
2001	"Please Don't Mind"	–	48	10	Get Down or Lay Down
