= My Projects =

Single by Coo Coo Cal

from the album Disturbed
- Released: 2001
- Studio: Infinite Recordings Studio (Milwaukee, WI)
- Genre: Hip-hop
- Length: 3:45
- Label: Tommy Boy
- Songwriters: Calvin Bellamy; Henry Cook
- Producer: Bigg Hank

Music video
- "My Projects" (Clean) on YouTube

"My Projects" a hip-hop song written and performed by American rapper Coo Coo Cal. It was released in 2001 via Tommy Boy Records as the lead single from the artist's third studio album, Disturbed. Recording sessions took place at Infinite Recordings Studio in Milwaukee. Production was handled by Bigg Hank, who also shares songwriting credits on the song.

In the United States, the single peaked at number 81 on Billboard Hot 100, number 22 on the Hot R&B/Hip-Hop Songs and atop the Hot Rap Songs charts. Official remix versions features contributions from Kurupt, Trick Daddy and Indo G.

For the year 2001, "My Projects" was one of the biggest rap singles of the year, reaching number-eight on the Billboard Year-End Hot Rap Singles of 2001.

== Track listing ==
| No. | Title | Length |
|---|---|---|
| 1. | "My Projects" (Main Mix) |
| 2. | "My Projects" (Clean) |
| 3. | "Dedication" |
| 4. | "My Projects" (Instrumental) |

| No. | Title | Length |
|---|---|---|
| 1. | "My Projects (Clean Radio Remix)" (featuring Trick Daddy, Kurupt and Indo G.) |
| 2. | "My Projects (Clean Radio Remix)" (featuring Trick Daddy) |
| 3. | "My Projects (Clean Radio Remix)" (featuring Kurupt) |
| 4. | "My Projects (Remix)" (featuring Trick Daddy, Kurupt and Indo G.) |
| 5. | "My Projects (Remix Instrumental)" |
| 6. | "My Projects (Album Version)" |

== Charts ==
=== Weekly charts ===
| Chart (2001) | Peak position |
|---|---|
| US Billboard Hot 100 | 81 |
| US Hot R&B/Hip-Hop Songs (Billboard) | 22 |
| US Hot Rap Songs (Billboard) | 1 |

=== Year-end charts ===
| Chart (2001) | Position |
|---|---|
| Billboard Hot Rap Singles | 8 |

== See also ==
- List of Billboard number-one rap singles of the 2000s
