= Claudette Ortiz =

American contemporary R&B singer

- Born: July 21, 1981 (age 45); Willingboro Township, New Jersey, U.S.
- Genres: Hip hop, R&B
- Occupations: Singer, model, television personality
- Instruments: Guitar, vocals
- Years active: 1999–present
- Formerly of: City High
- Website: www.myclaudette.com

Claudette Ortiz (born July 21, 1981) is an American singer, model and television personality, best known as a member of the R&B trio City High. Ortiz also was a castmate in TV One's reality series R&B Divas: Los Angeles.

== Early life ==
Born on July 21, 1981, Ortiz is of Puerto Rican descent and was raised in Willingboro Township, New Jersey, where she attended Willingboro High School, as did the other members of City High.

== Career ==
=== 2001–2003: City High ===
City High began with Robbie Pardlo signing on as a solo artist. However, the producers decided that it should be a two-man group featured on the album. Soon after the two-man group began to work on their album, the group became successful. In order to stand out, the producers decided to add a female member. They chose Ortiz, a singer who had also attended Willingboro High School.

During production, all three members did writing on the songs. The trio focused on trying to create lyrics that told a story, with Toby noting that he drew inspiration for this from country music. A large number of the songs, such as "What Would You Do?", are based on the trio's real-life experiences.

In 1999, the group recorded "What Would You Do?", formally released in 2001, two years prior to the release of their self-titled debut album, as it was featured in the comedy drama film Life. The group disbanded in 2003, failing to release another album despite their debut's success.

In November 2002, Ortiz appeared as Amber, in the episode titled "Jr's Dating Dilemma", on ABC's My Wife and Kids.

=== 2004–present: Solo career and reality television ===
In 2006, Ortiz released her first solo single "Can't Get Enough" featuring Mase. She also appeared on Wyclef Jean's track "Dance Like This" which was featured on the Dirty Dancing: Havana Nights soundtrack. Other artists she has worked with include rappers Nas and Ja Rule.

Ortiz worked with producers will.i.am, Pharrell, So Klassik, Noize Trip, and Jerry Wonda for her postponed debut album around 2014. In an interview, she stated: "I've been working in between my kids. I was on Interscope but they didn't like the material; after I had Bella they released me. I'd just been waiting for her to get a little bigger & stronger. She'll be 2 in April. So I'm back working... Anton Marchand is managing me and I'm in talks with an independent label... I'm about to go hard and I'm excited! I feel good, I'm happy, I'm single... I've been in a relationship most of my adult life... I'm not dating. I'm just enjoying delving into myself. Learning more about me and focusing on my kids."

In 2013, Ortiz was a castmate in TV One's reality show R&B Divas: Los Angeles, which also featured Chanté Moore, Michel'le, Lil' Mo, Dawn Robinson, and Kelly Price. In 2015, Ortiz starred as October in Tyler Perry's stage play Madea on the Run. She had a recurring role as Claudia on Tyler Perry's If Loving You Is Wrong.

== Personal life ==
Prior to forming City High, Ortiz and Robbie Pardlo dated during high school. After their break-up, Ortiz began a romantic relationship with group member Ryan Toby, whom she divorced in 2007 after three years of marriage. Together, they have two sons.

In an interview Ortiz spoke about her daughter, stating that she did not know the guy reported by the media to be her daughter's father. "So hold on… you don’t know that guy that is being reported as your daughter’s father?" Claudette Ortiz: "No, I don’t know who that is. I saw a rumor on Wikipedia a while back saying I was dating him and had a child by him… I was in the studio with Bryan Michael Cox and we were laughing about it… I wasn’t even pregnant with my daughter yet… I don’t know that guy and never met him. My daughter's father is just a normal hard working business man. He's not even in the industry."

In 2013, Ortiz was contemplating joining the U.S. Air Force Reserves, when she was contacted by TV One's producer Phil Thornton to do R&B Divas. She relocated her family from New Jersey to partake in the series.

== Singles ==
Title	Year	Peak chart positions				Album
Title	Year	U.S.	U.S. R&B	U.S Rap	UK	Album
"Can't Get Enough" (featuring Mase)	2006	89	37	42	96	Non-album releases
"Simply Amazin'"	2010	—	—	—	—	Non-album releases

=== As featured performer ===
List of singles, with selected chart positions
Title	Year	Peak chart positions					Certifications	Album
Title	Year	AUS	U.S.	U.S. R&B	UK	NZ	Certifications	Album
"Two Wrongs" (Wyclef Jean featuring Claudette Ortiz)	2002	5	28	11	14	1	AUS: Platinum; NZ: Platinum	Masquerade

== See also ==
- List of Afro-Latinos
- List of Puerto Ricans
