= Ryan Toby =

American contemporary R&B singer

- Born: Maurice Ryan Toby; November 26, 1976 (age 49); Willingboro, New Jersey, U.S.
- Occupations: Singer; songwriter; record producer; actor
- Years active: 1993–present
- Label: Interscope Records
- Member of: City High

Maurice Ryan Toby (born November 26, 1976) is an American singer-songwriter, record producer and actor. He first gained popularity for his appearance in the film Sister Act 2: Back in the Habit (1993). He is best known as a member of the Grammy Award-nominated R&B trio City High.

== Career ==
=== 1993–1997: Film debut and songwriting ===
In 1993, Toby was cast as singing student Ahmal in Sister Act 2: Back in the Habit, director Bill Duke's sequel to the 1992 comedy film Sister Act. While the film would gain a cult following as it was starting to play on television, it was initially considered a box office flop compared to the first one. Five years after the film, Toby was still struggling to secure a solo recording deal. He was eventually signed to DJ Jazzy Jeff's A Touch of Jazz production company and began work on his debut album. Through Jeff, he came into contact with rapper Will Smith who asked him to pen songs for his debut solo album Big Willie Style (1997), including the top ten single "Miami." While his own debut album failed to materialize, Toby remained with Jeff after the success of Big Willie Style to work with inhouse producers Andre Harris and Vidal Davis from duo Dre & Vidal and Carvin & Ivan on material for others artists, including Jill Scott, Musiq Soulchild, Glenn Lewis, and Floetry.

=== 1998–2003: City High ===
In late 1998, Toby ran into his former manager, Marvin Thompson. Thompson introduced him to Robbie Pardlo who had recently signed to Interscope Records via The Fugees member Wyclef Jean's Booga Basement label. Pardlo asked him to do some writing for his debut project. After bumping into Jean during the recording sessions of Whitney Houston's "My Love Is Your Love" (1999), he suggested them to form a two-man group. Soon after the duo began to work on their album. In order to stand out, Jean and Jerry Duplessis decided to add a female member. They chose Claudette Ortiz who had also attended Willingboro High School and was initially expected just to be featured on some of their hooks.

During production, all three members participated in writing songs for the album, though Toby did most of the writing, and Pardlo did most of the production, given that Ortiz was just 16 years old. While their debut single, "What Would You Do?," was originally featured on the soundtrack to the 1999 film Life, the track was not formally released as a single until March 2001. This helped with the sale of the trio's debut album City High, which would a became a hit upon its May 2001, achieving Gold status within four months. Toby, Oritz, and Pardlo finished work on a second album; however, the group disbanded in 2003, failing to release another album despite their debut's success.

=== 2004–present: Solo career ===
Shortly before City High broke up, Toby received a call from Andre Harris who persuaded Toby to join him and Vidal Davis at their new recording studio in Philadelphia to work on new material. One of their first collaborations was a song titled "Superstar" which would later be recorded by Usher for his fourth studio album Confessions (2004). The trio worked on four additional songs for the project, two of which also ended up on the album. The success of Confessions would lead to further work with musicians Mary J. Blige, Justin Bieber, Chris Brown, Ginuwine, Tyrese, LL Cool J, and Lionel Richie. In 2020, amid the COVID-19 pandemic, Toby released a series of albums, called Songs for the Lockdown, as well as a Christmas album named Songs for the Season.

== Personal life ==
From 2004 to 2007, Toby was married to fellow singer Claudette Ortiz. They share two sons.

== Discography ==
=== Studio albums ===
- Songs for the Lockdown, Vol. 1 (2020)
- Songs for the Lockdown, Vol. 2 (2020)
- Songs for the Lockdown, Vol. 3 (2020)
- Songs for the Lockdown, Vol. 4 (2020)
- Songs for the Lockdown, Vol. 5 (2020)
- Songs for the Lockdown, Vol. 6 (2020)
- Songs for the Lockdown, Vol. 7 (2020)
- Songs for the Lockdown, Vol. 8 (2020)
- Songs for the Lockdown, Vol. 9 (2020)
- Songs for the Lockdown, Vol. 10 (2020)
- Songs for the Season (2020)

== Selected filmography ==
- Sister Act 2: Back in the Habit (1993)
- Prison Song (2001)
- Another Christmas (2021)
- En direct du jour de l'an (2025)
