= Bootylicious =

2001 single by Destiny's Child

Single by Destiny's Child

from the album Survivor
- B-side: "Cards Never Lie"
- Released: May 22, 2001
- Studio: SugarHill (Houston, Texas); Sound on Sound (New York City)
- Genre: R&B
- Length: 3:28
- Label: Columbia
- Songwriters: Beyoncé Knowles; Falonte Moore; Rob Fusari; Stevie Nicks
- Producers: Falonte Moore; Beyoncé Knowles; Rob Fusari

Destiny's Child singles chronology
"Survivor" (2001)	"Bootylicious" (2001)	"Emotion" (2001)

Missy Elliott singles chronology
"Lick Shots" (2001)	"Bootylicious One" (remix) (2001)	"One Minute Man" (2001)

Music videos
- "Bootylicious" on YouTube; "Bootylicious" (remix) on YouTube

"Bootylicious" is a song by American group Destiny's Child recorded for their third studio album, Survivor (2001). It was written and produced by Beyoncé, Falonte Moore, and Rob Fusari. The song contains a prominent sample from Stevie Nicks' song "Edge of Seventeen". It was released as the second single from Survivor on May 22, 2001, by Columbia Records.

"Bootylicious" was a commercial success, becoming the group's fourth and final US Billboard Hot 100 number-one single. It also reached the top five in Australia, Canada, the Netherlands, and the United Kingdom. A Rockwilder remix of the song featured Missy "Misdemeanor" Elliott and appeared on the soundtrack of the 2001 musical film Carmen: A Hip Hopera as well as the group's remix album This Is the Remix (2002).

Although the term "bootylicious" had already been used by rapper Snoop Dogg in Dr. Dre's song "Fuck wit Dre Day (And Everybody's Celebratin')" (1992), the popularity of "Bootylicious" caused the slang word to become widespread; it was added to the Oxford English Dictionary in 2004 under the definition "(of a woman) sexually attractive".

== Writing and production ==
"Bootylicious" was written and produced by Beyoncé Knowles, Falonte Moore, and Rob Fusari, and was recorded at SugarHill Recording Studios in Houston and Sound on Sound Studios in New York City. There are conflicting accounts regarding the song's origins. According to Knowles, she was inspired to write the song on a flight to either London or Japan while listening to the guitar riff from Stevie Nicks' song "Edge of Seventeen", which reminded her of a "voluptuous woman". According to Fusari, he initially wanted to build a track around a sample of Survivor's "Eye of the Tiger". Unable to locate the song, he chose to sample "Edge of Seventeen" instead. Fusari wanted to replay the guitar riff himself in the studio to avoid losing publishing royalties, but group manager Mathew Knowles (father of Beyoncé Knowles) would not allow him to do so.

== Composition ==
According to sheet music published by EMI Music Publishing at Musicnotes.com, "Bootylicious" is an R&B song set in common time with a medium funk tempo of 104 beats per minute. It is written in the key of E minor (recorded in D♯ minor), and Destiny's Child's vocals span from G_{3} to B_{5}. Kelly Rowland performs the majority of the lead vocals on the track, leading both verses, while Knowles leads the choruses and Michelle Williams sings lead on the bridge.

== Commercial performance ==
"Bootylicious" debuted at number 66 on the US Billboard Hot 100 on June 9, 2001. Nine weeks later, the song reached number one, becoming the group's fourth and final number-one single in the United States. It remained on the chart for 19 additional weeks. Its chart-topping status was aided by a physical-single price reduction to 49 cents, which Tommy Mottola, head of Columbia Records, implemented in an attempt to block the single "Loverboy"—by his ex-wife Mariah Carey—from reaching the top spot. While "Loverboy" outsold it in physical sales, superior radio airplay for "Bootylicious" helped it top the chart. It remained the last song by a girl group to top the chart until 2025, when the virtual band Huntrix reached number one with "Golden".

In the United Kingdom, "Bootylicious" debuted and peaked at number two on the UK Singles Chart, behind Atomic Kitten's "Eternal Flame". The Official Charts Company attributed this result to "Bootylicious" having already been available on Survivor, whereas the reissue of Atomic Kitten's album Right Now was not released until after "Eternal Flame" had reached number one. "Bootylicious" sold over 169,000 copies and propelled Survivor back to the top of the UK Albums Chart. The song also reached the top 10 in several other countries, including Australia, Canada, Ireland, the Netherlands, New Zealand, Norway, and Sweden. It additionally entered the top 20 in Finland, France, Germany, and Italy, and the top 30 in Austria.

== Music video ==
The music video for "Bootylicious", directed by Matthew Rolston and filmed from May 7–9, 2001, features Destiny's Child performing dance moves from Michael Jackson's famous "Billie Jean" performance on the television special Motown 25: Yesterday, Today, Forever. During the video, choreography from several other Michael Jackson videos is referenced, including "Thriller", "Beat It", "Bad", and "The Way You Make Me Feel", as well as routines Jackson used during live performances of "They Don't Care About Us".

As the group dances, the members appear in several costume changes. These scenes are interspersed with the group performing in front of an all-male dance troupe. The dance sequence concludes on a diamond-shaped stage where the members wear pink crop tops while the shirtless male dancers wear Jackson's signature single glove and sagging pants displaying underwear emblazoned with "Destiny" across the back. Stevie Nicks also makes an appearance, playing the sampled riff on guitar. Solange Knowles, Beyoncé's sister, makes a brief cameo as well.

The video for "Bootylicious" began airing on BET, VH1, and MTV during the week ending May 27, 2001, premiering on the latter network's Making the Video series. The version of the song featured in the video differs slightly from the album track: it removes the synth strings, DJ scratching, and percussion fills in favor of a drier mix, cuts out the bass guitar partway through the final chorus, and fades out the instrumental to leave only the vocals sung a cappella near the end. This version was never commercially released.

The video is included on the DualDisc edition of the 2005 compilation album #1's and as an enhanced video track on the UK and French single releases. The music video for the Rockwilder remix featuring Missy Elliott is included on the "Urban Remixes" edition of the UK CD single for "Emotion".

== Live performances ==
Destiny's Child opened the inaugural BET Awards in 2001 with a performance of "Bootylicious". They also performed the song at both Michael Jackson: 30th Anniversary Celebration concerts, incorporating their rendition of his dance choreography. Prior to the video's premiere, the group dedicated it to Jackson. According to Kelly Rowland, Jackson enjoyed the song so much that when he met the group for the first time, he began singing it to them. On February 3, 2013, Beyoncé performed the track alongside Rowland and Williams during the Super Bowl XLVII halftime show, followed by Beyoncé's "Single Ladies (Put a Ring on It)".

== Remixes ==
A hip hop-style remix (the Rockwilder remix) was produced by Rockwilder, Knowles, and Missy Elliott. This version was issued to urban radio outlets and was accompanied by a hip hop-themed music video. In the video, Beyoncé wears a belt buckle with the word "Bootylicious" misspelled as "Bootyliciuos", a detail pointed out by Carson Daly on an episode of Total Request Live.

A combination of the R&B vocals from "Bootylicious" and the grunge rock instrumentation of Nirvana's "Smells Like Teen Spirit" became one of the best-known early examples of the "bastard pop" or "mashup" genre. A later mashup paired the music of Stevie Wonder's "Superstition" with the vocal track of "Bootylicious".

== Legacy ==
"Bootylicious" generated moderate controversy for pushing the boundaries of female sexuality. While Destiny's Child maintained that the song promoted "G-rated fun" and body confidence, commentators argued that the music video presented more provocative themes through heavy makeup, form-fitting attire, suggestive choreography, and close-up camera angles focused on dancers' buttocks. The song popularized the portmanteau "bootylicious", blending "booty" and "delicious". The term had previously been used by Snoop Dogg as a pejorative in Dr. Dre's 1992 song "Fuck wit Dre Day (And Everybody's Celebratin')" (also known as "Dre Day" on The Chronic). "Bootylicious" was also spoken by the character Champ (Shaun Baker) in a 1993 episode of A Different World ("Homey, Don't Ya Know Me?"), and appeared in the 1999 video game Duke Nukem: Time to Kill as the name of a strip club.

The commercial impact of the single coincided with increased media visibility for curvaceous celebrities such as Jennifer Lopez. Commentators noted that this broader cultural shift reflected greater appreciation for fuller figures traditionally celebrated in Black and Latina communities. The slang term subsequently crossed over into mainstream English vernacular, reflecting the broader impact of African-American popular culture, fashion, and language. In September 2011, VH1 ranked "Bootylicious" at number 19 on its list of "The 100 Greatest Songs of the 2000s". Rowland has remarked that "Bootylicious" is her least favorite Destiny's Child song to hear simply because she has heard it so many times.

== Track listings ==
US CD single

1. "Bootylicious" (album version) – 3:27
2. "Bootylicious" (Richard Vission's V-Quest) – 6:06

US and Canadian maxi-CD single

1. "Bootylicious" (album version) – 3:27
2. "Bootylicious" (Richard Vission's V-Quest) – 6:06
3. "Bootylicious" (Richard Vission's D.J. dub) – 5:27
4. "Bootylicious" (Big Boyz remix) – 3:28
5. "Bootylicious" (Case remix) – 4:45

US 12-inch single

A1. "Bootylicious" (Richard Vission's V-Quest) – 6:06
A2. "Bootylicious" (Richard Vission's D.J. dub) – 5:27
B1. "Bootylicious" (Big Boyz remix) – 3:28
B2. "Bootylicious" (Big Boyz remix instrumental) – 3:24
B3. "Bootylicious" (album version) – 3:27
B4. "Bootylicious" (album instrumental) – 3:27

UK CD single

1. "Bootylicious" (album version) – 3:27
2. "Bootylicious" (Ed Case refix) – 4:45
3. "Cards Never Lie" – 2:42
4. "Bootylicious" (video)

UK cassette single

1. "Bootylicious" (album version) – 3:27
2. "Bootylicious" (M and J's Jelly remix) – 3:40

UK 12-inch single

A1. "Bootylicious" (album version) – 3:27
A2. "Bootylicious" (Rockwilder remix featuring Missy Elliott) – 4:13
B1. "Bootylicious" (Ed Case refix) – 4:45

European CD1

1. "Bootylicious" (album version) – 3:27
2. "Bootylicious" (Ed Case refix) – 4:45

European CD2

1. "Bootylicious" (album version) – 3:27
2. "Bootylicious" (Ed Case refix) – 4:45
3. "Bootylicious" (M&J's Jelly remix) – 3:40
4. "Bootylicious" (video version)

Australian CD single

1. "Bootylicious" – 3:27
2. "Survivor" (Jameson full vocal remix) – 6:19
3. "Survivor" (Digital Black-N-Groove) – 4:00
4. "Survivor" (CB200 Club Anthem mix) – 6:20
5. "Independent Women Part I" (live at the Brit Awards 2001)

Japanese CD single

1. "Bootylicious" (radio edit) – 3:01
2. "Bootylicious" (Rockwilder remix) – 3:53
3. "Bootylicious" (Richard Vission's V-Quest) – 6:07
4. "Bootylicious" (M&J's Jelly remix) – 3:40
5. "Bootylicious" (Big Boyz remix) – 3:30

== Personnel ==
Personnel are adapted from the liner notes of #1's.

- Beyoncé Knowles – vocals, writing, production
- Kelly Rowland – lead vocals
- Michelle Williams – vocals, mixing
- Rob Fusari – writing, production
- Falonte Moore – writing, production
- Stevie Nicks – writing ("Edge of Seventeen")
- Dan Workman – engineering
- Tony Maserati – mixing
- Flip Osman – mixing assistance

== Charts ==
=== Weekly charts ===
Weekly chart performance for "Bootylicious"
Chart (2001)	Peak position
Australia (ARIA)	4
Australian Urban (ARIA)	2
Austria (Ö3 Austria Top 40)	23
Belgium (Ultratop 50 Flanders)	9
Belgium (Ultratop 50 Wallonia)	7
Canada (Nielsen SoundScan)	4
Canada CHR (Nielsen BDS)	2
Denmark (Tracklisten)	12
Europe (Eurochart Hot 100)	5
Finland (Suomen virallinen lista)	11
France (SNEP)	14
Germany (GfK)	16
Ireland (IRMA)	5
Italy (FIMI)	16
Netherlands (Dutch Top 40)	3
Netherlands (Single Top 100)	5
New Zealand (Recorded Music NZ)	4
Norway (VG-lista)	5
Scottish Singles Sales (Official Charts)	4
Sweden (Sverigetopplistan)	8
Switzerland (Schweizer Hitparade)	11
UK Singles (Official Charts)	2
UK Airplay (Music Week)	1
UK Dance (Official Charts)	6
UK Hip Hop/R&B (Official Charts)	1
US Billboard Hot 100	1
US Dance Club Songs (Billboard)	13
US Dance Singles Sales (Billboard)	2
US Hot R&B/Hip-Hop Songs (Billboard)	2
US Pop Airplay (Billboard)	6
US Rhythmic Airplay (Billboard)	10

=== Year-end charts ===
2001 year-end chart performance for "Bootylicious"
Chart (2001)	Position
Australia (ARIA)	50
Belgium (Ultratop 50 Flanders)	75
Belgium (Ultratop 50 Wallonia)	56
Canada (Nielsen SoundScan)	40
Canada Radio (Nielsen BDS)	61
Europe (Eurochart Hot 100)	73
France (SNEP)	90
Ireland (IRMA)	39
Netherlands (Dutch Top 40)	48
Netherlands (Single Top 100)	75
Sweden (Hitlistan)	67
Switzerland (Schweizer Hitparade)	77
UK Singles (OCC)	67
UK Airplay (Music Week)	27
UK Urban (Music Week)	28
US Billboard Hot 100	42
US Hot R&B/Hip-Hop Singles & Tracks (Billboard)	57
US Mainstream Top 40 (Billboard)	41
US Maxi-Singles Sales (Billboard)	12
US Rhythmic Top 40 (Billboard)	54

2002 year-end chart performance for "Bootylicious"
Chart (2002)	Position
Canada (Nielsen SoundScan)	195

== Certifications ==
Certifications and sales for "Bootylicious"
Region	Certification	Certified units/sales
Australia (ARIA)	Platinum	70,000^{^}
New Zealand (RMNZ)	Platinum	30,000^{‡}
United Kingdom (BPI)	Platinum	646,000
United States (RIAA)	Platinum	1,000,000^{‡}
^{^} Shipments figures based on certification alone.^{‡} Sales+streaming figures based on certification alone.

== Release history ==
Release dates and formats for "Bootylicious"
Region	Date	Format(s)	Label(s)	Ref.
United States	May 22, 2001	Rhythmic contemporary radio	Columbia	
United States	May 29, 2001	Contemporary hit radio; urban contemporary radio	Columbia	
France	July 9, 2001	Maxi CD	Sony Music	
Germany	July 16, 2001	CD; maxi CD	Sony Music	
United States	July 17, 2001	12-inch vinyl; CD; maxi CD	Columbia	
Australia	July 23, 2001	Maxi CD	Sony Music	
United Kingdom	July 23, 2001	12-inch vinyl; cassette; maxi CD	Columbia	
Japan	July 25, 2001	Maxi CD	Sony	
France	August 27, 2001	CD	Sony Music	
Canada	September 11, 2001	CD	Columbia	

== In popular culture ==
=== Cover versions ===
English rock band Keane performed a medley consisting of "Bootylicious" and Christina Aguilera and Redman's "Dirrty" on Jo Whiley's Live Lounge. An audio recording is available on the 2007 compilation Radio 1's Live Lounge – Volume 2. The cast of the Fox television show Glee performed a cover version in the 2009 first season episode "Hairography". The Green Bay Packers covered the song in the 2015 film Pitch Perfect 2.

=== Use in commercials ===
"Bootylicious" was used in a commercial for the video game Candy Crush Jelly Saga in 2016.

=== In other media ===
It appeared in "Grand Finale", the 2019 season 11 finale of drag queen reality competition RuPaul's Drag Race, where contestants Brooke Lynn Hytes and Silky Nutmeg Ganache had to lipsync to it in order to advance to the final round. American singer Normani used the song in her performance on the reality competition show Lip Sync Battle, which aired on February 1, 2018. Her set was reminiscent of the song's music video, and at some point, one of the backup dancers "trips" in front of Normani, a callback to Michelle Williams's infamous fall during a performance of "Soldier" by the group on 106 & Park in 2004.

The song appeared in Disney and Pixar's 2022 animated film Turning Red.

== See also ==
- List of Billboard Hot 100 number ones of 2001
- List of UK R&B Singles Chart number ones of 2001
