= Survivor (Destiny's Child song) =

2001 single by Destiny's Child

Single by Destiny's Child

from the album Survivor
- Released: March 6, 2001
- Recorded: 2000
- Studio: SugarHill (Houston, Texas)
- Length: 4:14
- Label: Columbia
- Songwriters: Beyoncé Knowles; Anthony Dent; Mathew Knowles
- Producers: Anthony Dent; Beyoncé Knowles

Destiny's Child singles chronology
"Independent Women Part I" (2000)	"Survivor" (2001)	"Bootylicious" (2001)

Music video
- "Survivor" on YouTube

"Survivor" is a song by American group Destiny's Child from their third studio album, Survivor (2001). It was written and composed by group member Beyoncé Knowles, Anthony Dent, and Mathew Knowles. "Survivor" was inspired by a joke that a radio station had made about the fact that three members had already left the group, comparing the band to the reality game show Survivor. Knowles was inspired to take the negative comment and turn it into a positive by writing a song out of it. The song was released as the lead single from Survivor on March 6, 2001, by Columbia Records. It marked the first single released by the trio of Beyoncé Knowles, Kelly Rowland, and Michelle Williams.

"Survivor" was a commercial success, peaking at number two on the US Billboard Hot 100 and topping the charts in Ireland, Norway, and the United Kingdom. Critically acclaimed, the song won the Best R&B Performance by a Duo or Group with Vocals at the 44th Annual Grammy Awards (2002). Its accompanying music video won the 2001 MTV Video Music Award for Best R&B Video, while the song also won a 2001 Soul Train Lady of Soul Award for Best R&B/Soul Single, Group, Band or Duo. In 2017, Billboard ranked the song at number 40 on their list "100 Greatest Girl Group Songs of All Time". Additionally, BET named it the 10th-best song of the 2000s.

== Background and development ==
"Survivor" was written by Anthony Dent, Destiny's Child band member Beyoncé Knowles and her father Mathew, while production was helmed by Dent and Beyoncé. The lyrics address the hardships that the band experienced in 2000, when original members LaTavia Roberson and LeToya Luckett split from Knowles and Kelly Rowland, and were replaced by Michelle Williams and Farrah Franklin. Soon afterwards Franklin was also dismissed from the group, leading to more well-publicized personnel changes. According to Knowles, the group was publicly compared to the reality series Survivor, which inspired her to "write us out of all that negativity."

Dent initially envisioned his instrumental track to be recorded by rapper Lil' Kim, before Beyoncé used it to pen the lyrics, melody and vocal arrangement for "Survivor." Much of the song was written during a flight to the next city while Destiny's Child was opening for singer Christina Aguilera during her Christina Aguilera in Concert tour. Knowles later elaborated on the process: "I wrote it quickly because I was frustrated. For me, it was all about what survival means for women, and how hard it is to be one when there are people out there who are trying to bring you down." She further commented on its concept in an interview with MTV in which she stated that "Survivor" was "basically about surviving different situations. Everyone in this world that I know, they've survived something, and I know the song is definitely inspirational. It really makes you feel strong, and it really makes you feel like you can survive anything."

Recording of the song took place at the SugarHill Studios in Houston, Texas in late 2000. "Survivor" was the first song from its parent album Survivor to be recorded. In a promotional 2001 interview with Billboard, Williams commented on the recording process: "Words can't describe how we felt when we recorded that song. Some of us were crying, others were jumping up and down [...] We prayed before that session, and the energy in that session was so high –— the room was heated." The chanting of the word "what!" in the chorus was Mathew Knowles' contribution to the song and added late into the recording of the "Survivor" after he had walked into the session while the band was recording and felt that a chanting part would suggest audience participation. The group debuted the song live during their RodeoHouston concert on February 18, 2001.

== Composition ==
The song is performed in the key of G♯ minor, with a tempo of 81 beats per minute in common time. In the harmonic minor scale, it follows a chord progression of G♯m–C♯m7–D♯, and the group's vocals span an octave and a half, from G♯_{3} to C♯_{5}.

== Critical reception ==
Billboard critic Chuck Taylor noted that "Survivor" was "careful not to stray from the well-established formula that has made Destiny's Child the pop act du jour – a skittish stop- and-start beat, the puissant vocals of co-songwriter/producer Beyoncé Knowles, and a lyric about life in the victory lane when mankind does you wrong." In 2017, Billboard also ranked the song at number 40 on their list of the "100 Greatest Girl Group Songs of All Time". AllMusic editor Stephen Thomas Erlewine found that "Survivor" was "painfully labored, stuttering over a halting melody that Beyoncé Knowles breathlessly pushes to absolutely nowhere, working it so hard that it's difficult to listen."

== Commercial performance ==
"Survivor" debuted at number 43 on the US Billboard Hot 100, making it the group's second highest-debuting single to date, behind 2004's "Lose My Breath" at number 30. It quickly ascended through the chart, reaching its peak of number two within a month, remaining at the position for seven consecutive weeks. The song was not released on physical formats until after its airplay had peaked; it topped the Billboard Maxi-Singles Sales chart for eight weeks. It also peaked at number five on the Hot R&B/Hip-Hop Singles & Tracks chart. Its DVD edition peaked at number nine on the US Top Music Videos chart.

In the United Kingdom, "Survivor" debuted at number one on the UK Singles Chart, selling 104,000 copies in its first week. It had sold 260,000 copies by the end of 2001, and has sold over 832,000 copies as of April 2021. It also topped the charts in Ireland and Norway, while peaking at number two in Canada and number three in New Zealand.

== Music video ==
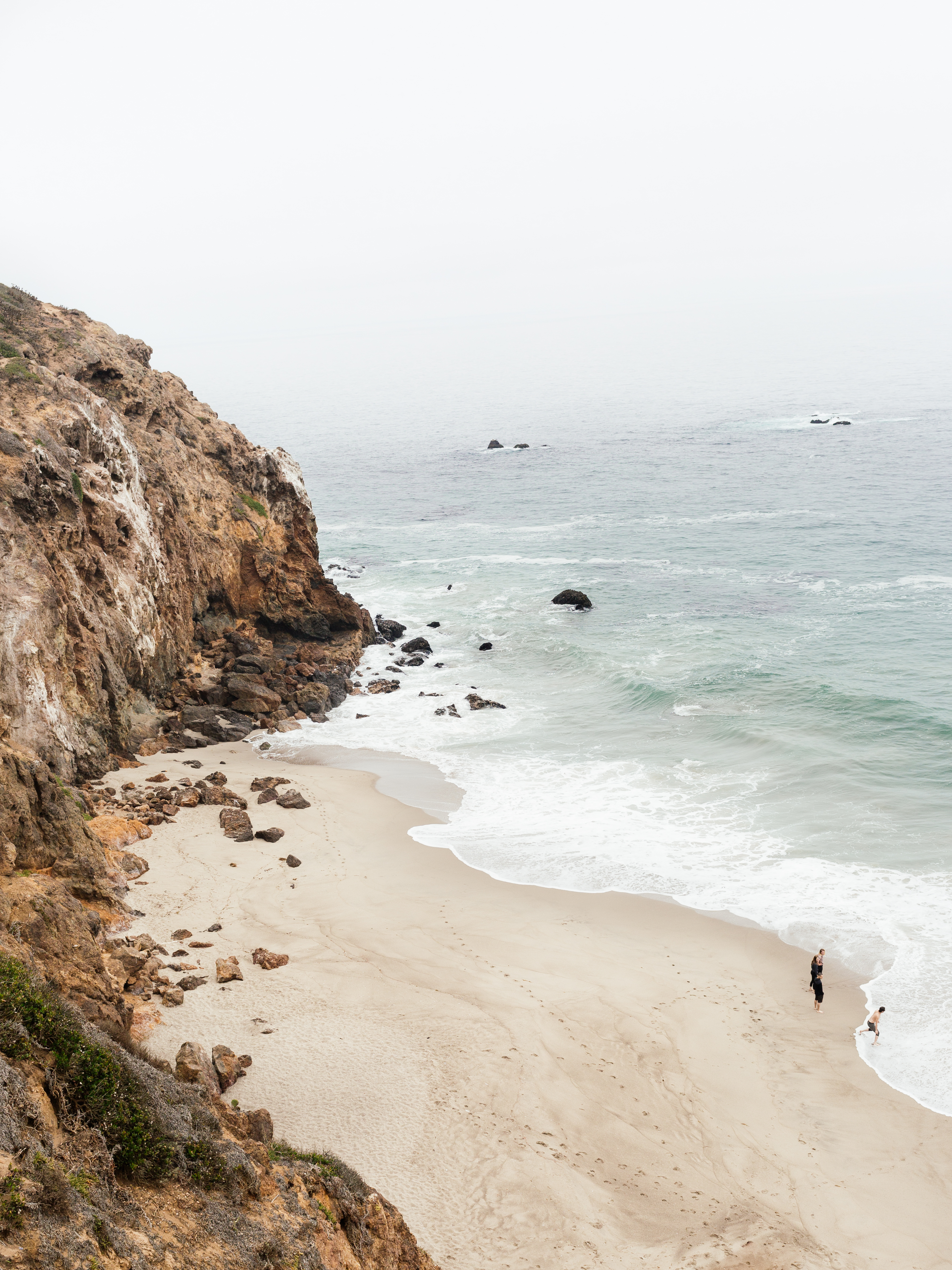
Parts of the music video for "Survivor" were filmed at Point Dume.

An accompanying music video for "Survivor" was directed by Darren Grant and filmed in various locations throughout Los Angeles County, California on January 27–29, 2001. The clip is styled in the sense of three survivors living on an uninhabited island. It also shows a brief prelude to how the trio got shipwrecked. Following their shipwreck, they uncover an island where they change clothes and walk into a waterfall leading to a deserted temple where it transforms into a dance break. It storms on through the dance bridge and the prelude of the shipwreck. After this, a helicopter starts buzzing leading to where the members are racing out of the island for their escape. External shots in the video were filmed at Point Dume State Beach on the coast of Malibu as well as the Los Angeles County Arboretum and Botanic Garden in Arcadia, with the rest of the sequences being filmed at the Los Angeles Center Studios.

The final video premiered on MTV's making of documentary series Making the Video on March 6, 2001. One of Destiny's Child's "most difficult videos" to film due to the unseasonal weather conditions in California in late January 2001, the band was reportedly "sick for days" after shooting beach scenes in their skimpy outfits. The "Survivor" music video was later released on DVD with a live performance of "Independent Women Part I" at the 2001 Brit Awards on May 15, 2001. The release was a standard full-frame transfer that preserved the original aspect ratio of the video, with an English soundtrack rendered in Dolby Digital Stereo. It was featured on the DualDisc edition of their greatest hits album #1's (2005), on the international edition of Survivor (2001) as an enhanced video, on the Walmart-exclusive DVD titled Fan Pack (2004), and on Video Anthology (2013). Director Cary Joji Fukunaga got his start in the film industry as a camera production assistant on the video.

== Controversy ==
Former group members LeToya Luckett and LaTavia Roberson filed a lawsuit against Knowles, Rowland, and former manager Mathew Knowles; they claimed some of the lyrics in "Survivor", such as "You thought I wouldn't sell without you/sold nine million", violated a previous agreement that prevented either party from insulting the other.

== Track listings ==
- US and Canadian CD single
1. "Survivor" (remix extended version featuring Da Brat) – 4:24
2. "Survivor" (Calderone club mix) – 9:26
3. "Survivor" (Calderone Drum Dub mix) – 6:45
4. "Survivor" (CB200 Club Anthem mix) – 6:20
5. "Survivor" (Azza'z soul remix) – 4:30
- US 7-inch single

A. "Survivor – 4:14
B. "Survivor" (featuring Da Brat) – 4:24

- US 12-inch single

A1. "Survivor" (Calderone club mix) – 9:26
A2. "Survivor" (Calderone Drum Dub mix) – 6:45
B1. "Survivor" (CB200 Club Anthem mix) – 6:20
B2. "Survivor" (remix extended version featuring Da Brat) – 4:24
B3. "Survivor" (Azza'z soul remix) – 4:30

- US DVD single
1. "Survivor"
2. "Independent Women Part I" (live at The Brits 2001)
- European CD single
1. "Survivor" (album version)
2. "Survivor" (Azza'z soul remix radio edit)
- UK CD1
1. "Survivor" (album version) – 4:14
2. "Survivor" (Azza'z soul remix radio edit) – 3:56
3. "Survivor" (Victor Calderone club mix) – 9:26
- UK CD2
1. "Survivor" (Jaimeson full vocal remix) – 6:19
2. "Independent Women Part I" (live at The Brits 2001) – 3:52
3. "So Good" (Maurice's soul remix) – 7:35
4. "Independent Women Part I" (live at The Brits 2001 video version)
- UK cassette single
1. "Survivor" (album version) – 4:14
2. "Survivor" (Maurice's Soul Survivor mix) – 7:51
- Australian CD single
1. "Survivor" (album version)
2. "So Good" (Maurice's soul remix)
3. "So Good" (Digital Black-N-Groove club mix)
4. "Independent Women Part I" (Joe Smooth 200 Proof 2 Step Mix)

== Personnel ==
Personnel are adapted from the liner notes of Survivor.

- Rich Balmer – assistant engineering
- Kerren Berz – strings
- Orlando Calzada – engineering
- Anthony Dent – engineering, production, writing
- Beyoncé Knowles – production, vocals, writing
- Mathew Knowles – executive production, writing
- Redd – keyboards
- Kelly Rowland – vocals
- Brian Springer – engineering
- Michelle Williams – vocals

== Charts ==
=== Weekly charts ===
Weekly chart performance for "Survivor"
Chart (2001)	Peak position
Australia (ARIA)	7
Australian Urban (ARIA)	5
Austria (Ö3 Austria Top 40)	10
Belgium (Ultratop 50 Flanders)	5
Belgium (Ultratop 50 Wallonia)	6
Canada (Nielsen SoundScan)	2
Canada CHR (Nielsen BDS)	4
Denmark (Tracklisten)	4
Europe (Eurochart Hot 100)	2
Finland (Suomen virallinen lista)	4
France (SNEP)	12
Germany (GfK)	8
Greece (IFPI)	3
Ireland (IRMA)	1
Italy (FIMI)	6
Netherlands (Dutch Top 40)	2
Netherlands (Single Top 100)	2
New Zealand (Recorded Music NZ)	3
Norway (VG-lista)	1
Poland Airplay (Music & Media)	8
Romania (Romanian Top 100)	4
Scottish Singles Sales (Official Charts)	2
Spain (Promusicae)	11
Sweden (Sverigetopplistan)	3
Switzerland (Schweizer Hitparade)	5
UK Singles (Official Charts)	1
UK Airplay (Music Week)	1
UK Hip Hop/R&B (Official Charts)	1
US Billboard Hot 100	2
US Dance Club Songs (Billboard) Remixes	3
US Dance Singles Sales (Billboard) Remixes	1
US Hot R&B/Hip-Hop Songs (Billboard)	6
US Pop Airplay (Billboard)	2
US Rhythmic Airplay (Billboard)	1
US Top Music Videos (Billboard)	9

=== Year-end charts ===
2001 year-end chart performance for "Survivor"
Chart (2001)	Position
Australia (ARIA)	55
Belgium (Ultratop 50 Flanders)	41
Belgium (Ultratop 50 Wallonia)	40
Canada (Nielsen SoundScan)	23
Canada (Nielsen SoundScan) European release	16
Canada Radio (Nielsen BDS)	85
Europe (Eurochart Hot 100)	36
France (SNEP)	70
Germany (Media Control)	73
Ireland (IRMA)	28
Netherlands (Dutch Top 40)	30
Netherlands (Single Top 100)	40
New Zealand (RIANZ)	47
Romania (Romanian Top 100)	50
Sweden (Hitlistan)	43
Switzerland (Schweizer Hitparade)	29
UK Singles (OCC)	35
UK Airplay (Music Week)	18
US Billboard Hot 100	23
US Hot R&B/Hip-Hop Singles & Tracks (Billboard)	47
US Mainstream Top 40 (Billboard)	32
US Maxi-Singles Sales (Billboard)	3
US Rhythmic Top 40 (Billboard)	22

2002 year-end chart performance for "Survivor"
Chart (2002)	Position
Canada (Nielsen SoundScan)	175

== Certifications ==
Certifications and sales for "Survivor"
Region	Certification	Certified units/sales
Australia (ARIA)	Platinum	70,000^{^}
Belgium (BRMA)	Gold	25,000^{*}
Denmark (IFPI Danmark)	Platinum	90,000^{‡}
Germany (BVMI)	Gold	250,000^{‡}
Italy (FIMI) Since 2009	Gold	50,000^{‡}
Japan (RIAJ) Full-length ringtone	Gold	100,000^{*}
Japan (RIAJ) Ringtone	2× Platinum	500,000^{*}
New Zealand (RMNZ)	Platinum	30,000^{‡}
Norway (IFPI Norway)	Gold	
Sweden (GLF)	Gold	15,000^{^}
United Kingdom (BPI)	2× Platinum	1,200,000^{‡}
United States (RIAA)	Platinum	1,000,000^{‡}
United States (RIAA) Video single	Gold	25,000^{^}
^{*} Sales figures based on certification alone.^{^} Shipments figures based on certification alone.^{‡} Sales+streaming figures based on certification alone.

== Release history ==
Release dates and formats for "Survivor"
Region	Date	Format(s)	Label(s)	Ref.
United States	March 6, 2001	Contemporary hit radio; urban contemporary radio	Columbia	
Australia	April 9, 2001	Maxi CD	Sony Music	
France	April 9, 2001	Maxi CD	Sony Music	
Germany	April 9, 2001	Maxi CD	Sony Music	
Japan	April 11, 2001	CD	SME	
United Kingdom	April 16, 2001	Cassette; two maxi CDs	Columbia	
France	May 2, 2001	CD	Sony Music	
United States	May 8, 2001	12-inch vinyl; maxi CD	Columbia	
United States	May 15, 2001	DVD	Columbia	

== Cover versions ==
In 2023, the film Migration was released, in which Mon Laferte sang a Spanglish cover of the song.

== See also ==
- List of number-one singles of 2001 (Ireland)
- List of UK Singles Chart number ones of the 2000s
- List of UK R&B Singles Chart number ones of 2001
- List of number-one songs in Norway
