= What Would You Do? (City High song) =

2001 single by City High

Single by City High

from the album City High
- Released: March 27, 2001
- Studio: Trackhouse, Booga Basement (New Jersey, US)
- Length: 3:32 (Life); 2:54 (City High)
- Label: Interscope; Booga Basement
- Songwriters: Robby Pardlo; Ryan Toby; Andre Young; Calvin Broadus; Brian Bailey
- Producers: Wyclef Jean; Jerry "Wonda" Duplessis; Robby Pardlo; Ryan Toby

City High singles chronology
"What Would You Do?" (2001)	"Caramel" (2001)

Music video
- "What Would You Do?" on YouTube

"What Would You Do?" is a song by American hip hop trio City High. It was released in March 2001 as the lead single from their self-titled debut album (2001). The track first appeared on the soundtrack of the 1999 film Life, starring Eddie Murphy and Martin Lawrence. The version of the song on City High's debut album differs from the one included on the Life soundtrack, as it features a sample of Dr. Dre and Snoop Dogg's hit song "The Next Episode".

"What Would You Do?" peaked at number eight on the US Billboard Hot 100, number two in Australia and Ireland, and number three in the United Kingdom. In 2002, the song was nominated for Best R&B Performance by a Duo or Group with Vocal at the 44th Annual Grammy Awards, losing to Destiny's Child's "Survivor".

== Content ==
The song "What Would You Do?" along with the accompanying music video, was likely intended as a motivational anthem for single parents dealing with poverty and especially acknowledging all the single mothers who feel forced into prostitution due to the need to support their children. It encourages them to keep strong and keep going on for the sake of their loved ones. Some lyrics were accused of victim-blaming, for example, the verse where the male singers accuse the woman of making "tired excuses."

== Track listings ==
US CD single and Australian CD1

1. "What Would You Do?" (album version)
2. "What Would You Do?" (instrumental)
3. "Caramel" (snippet)
4. "Best Friends" (snippet)
5. "Didn't Ya" (snippet)

UK CD single

1. "What Would You Do?" (album version) – 2:50
2. "It Ain't the Same" – 3:41
3. "What Would You Do?" (X-Men vocal remix) – 4:22
4. "What Would You Do?" (CD-ROM video) – 3:18

UK 12-inch single

A1. "What Would You Do?" (album version) – 2:50
A2. "What Would You Do?" (instrumental mix) – 2:48
B1. "What Would You Do?" (X-Men remix) – 4:22

UK cassette single

1. "What Would You Do?" (album version) – 2:50
2. "What Would You Do?" (X-Men vocal remix) – 4:22

European CD single

1. "What Would You Do?" (album version)
2. "What Would You Do?" (X-Men remix)

Australian CD2

1. "What Would You Do?" (album version)
2. "What Would You Do?" (X-Men remix)
3. "What Would You Do?" (instrumental)
4. "What Would You Do?" (video)

== Credits and personnel ==
Credits are taken from the City High liner notes.

Studios

- Recorded at Trackhouse Recording Studios and Booga Basement (New Jersey, US)
- Mixed and mastered at The Hit Factory (New York City)

Personnel

- Robby Pardlo – writing, production
- Ryan Toby – writing, production
- Andre Young – writing
- Calvin Broadus – writing
- Brian Bailey – writing
- Wyclef Jean – production
- Jerry "Wonda" Duplessis – production
- Serge "Sergical" Tsai – mixing, engineering
- Joe Yannece – mastering

== Charts ==
=== Weekly charts ===
Chart (2001)	Peak position
Australia (ARIA)	2
Australian Urban (ARIA)	1
Austria (Ö3 Austria Top 40)	58
Belgium (Ultratop 50 Flanders)	14
Canada (Nielsen SoundScan)	19
Canada CHR (Nielsen BDS)	5
Denmark (Tracklisten)	14
Europe (Eurochart Hot 100)	10
France (SNEP)	77
Germany (GfK)	24
Ireland (IRMA)	2
Netherlands (Dutch Top 40)	13
Netherlands (Single Top 100)	14
New Zealand (Recorded Music NZ)	20
Norway (VG-lista)	5
Scotland Singles (OCC)	5
South Africa (RISA)	5
Sweden (Sverigetopplistan)	12
Switzerland (Schweizer Hitparade)	7
UK Singles (OCC)	3
UK Dance (OCC)	5
UK Hip Hop/R&B (OCC)	1
US Billboard Hot 100	8
US Hot R&B/Hip-Hop Singles & Tracks (Billboard)	13
US Hot Rap Singles (Billboard)	1
US Mainstream Top 40 (Billboard)	2
US Rhythmic Top 40 (Billboard)	2

=== Year-end charts ===
Chart (2001)	Position
Australia (ARIA)	29
Europe (Eurochart Hot 100)	78
Ireland (IRMA)	13
Netherlands (Dutch Top 40)	83
Netherlands (Single Top 100)	94
Sweden (Hitlistan)	80
Switzerland (Schweizer Hitparade)	67
UK Singles (OCC)	18
US Billboard Hot 100	22
US Hot R&B/Hip-Hop Singles & Tracks (Billboard)	66
US Hot Rap Singles (Billboard)	2
US Mainstream Top 40 (Billboard)	24
US Rhythmic Top 40 (Billboard)	11

== Certifications ==
Region	Certification	Certified units/sales
Australia (ARIA)	Gold	35,000^{^}
New Zealand (RMNZ)	Platinum	30,000^{‡}
South Africa (RISA)	Platinum	50,000^{*}
United Kingdom (BPI)	Platinum	600,000^{‡}
^{*} Sales figures based on certification alone.^{^} Shipments figures based on certification alone.^{‡} Sales+streaming figures based on certification alone.

== Release history ==
Region	Date	Format(s)	Label(s)	Ref.
United States	March 27, 2001	Rhythmic contemporary radio	Interscope; Booga Basement	
United States	June 5, 2001	Contemporary hit radio	Interscope; Booga Basement	
United Kingdom	September 24, 2001	12-inch vinyl; CD; cassette	Interscope; Booga Basement	
Australia	October 1, 2001	CD1	Interscope; Booga Basement	
Australia	December 3, 2001	CD2	Interscope; Booga Basement	
