= City High =

American hip-hop group

- Origin: Willingboro Township, New Jersey, U.S.
- Genres: Hip-hop; R&B
- Years active: 1999–2003
- Labels: Interscope; Booga Basement; Trackmasters
- Past members: Ryan Toby; Robbie Pardlo; Claudette Ortiz

City High were an American hip-hop and R&B trio composed of Ryan Toby, Robbie Pardlo, and Claudette Ortiz. The group's biggest hit, the Wyclef Jean-produced 2001 single and MTV-staple, "What Would You Do?", peaked within the top ten of the Billboard Hot 100 and was nominated for Best R&B Performance by a Duo or Group at the 44th Annual Grammy Awards.

Released in May 2001, the trio's sole studio album, City High (2001), earned critical praise, moderately entered the Billboard 200, and spawned the Billboard Hot 100-top 20 single "Caramel" (featuring Eve). Despite its relative success, City High disbanded shortly after.

== Career ==
In 2001, City High released "What Would You Do?" from their self-titled album. Their follow-up single was "Caramel", with a remix featuring rapper Eve. The final single from the group's debut and only album was "City High Anthem".

Prior to the creation of City High, bandmates Claudette Ortiz and Robbie Pardlo dated throughout their high school years. After meeting and performing for Wyclef Jean, they were signed to his Booga Basement recording label. As Wooga Booga already had a duo, they invited Ryan Toby and became the City High trio instead.

Following her breakup with Pardlo, Ortiz went on to date Toby. Ortiz and Toby married in 2004. They divorced in 2007.

About the disbandment, Toby said: "We did a second album, it wasn't as good as the first album, it was a little rushed. There was some turmoil in the group, the vibe and chemistry was off. We decided to walk away."

Pardlo died in Willingboro, New Jersey, from heart failure on July 17, 2025, at the age of 46.

== Discography ==
=== Albums ===
List of studio albums, with selected chart positions and certifications
Title	Album details	Peak chart positions							Certifications
Title	Album details	US	US R&B	CAN	GER	NZ	UK	UK R&B	Certifications
City High	Released: May 22, 2001; Labels: Booga Basement, Interscope; Formats: CD, digital download, LP	34	23	55	82	11	89	14	RIAA: Gold

=== Singles ===
List of singles, with selected chart positions and certifications, showing year released and album name
Title	Year	Peak chart positions									Certifications	Album
Title	Year	US	US R&B	US Rhyth.	AUS	CAN	GER	NZ	SWI	UK	Certifications	Album
"What Would You Do?"	2001	8	13	2	2	19	24	20	7	3	ARIA: Gold; BPI: Platinum; RMNZ: Platinum	City High
"Caramel" (featuring Eve)	2001	18	9	3	47	—	70	—	72	9		City High
"City High Anthem"	2002	—	—	36	—	—	—	—	—	—		City High
"—" denotes a recording that did not chart or was not released in that territory.
