= Eiffel 65 discography =

Discography of Italian musical group

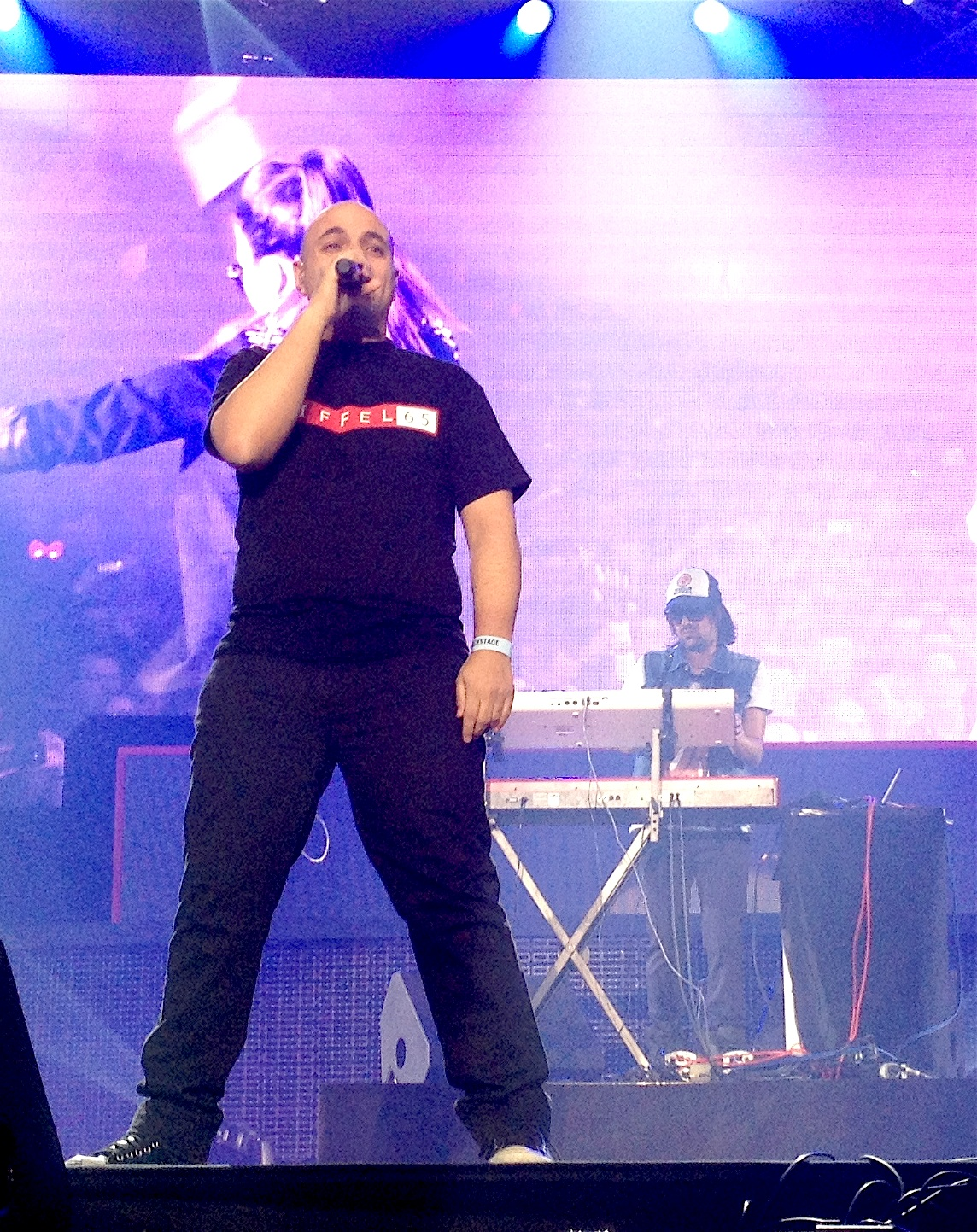
- Eiffel 65 performing at Ethias Arena, Hasselt (April 2013)
- Studio albums: 3
- EPs: 2
- Singles: 21

Italian musical group Eiffel 65 has released three studio albums, two extended plays and twenty-one singles.

== Albums ==
=== Studio albums ===
Title	Album details	Peak chart positions										Sales	Certifications
Title	Album details	ITA	AUS	AUT	FIN	FRA	GER	NZ	SWI	UK	US	Sales	Certifications
Europop	Released: 22 November 1999; Label: Bliss, Universal, Republic; Formats: CD, LP, cassette, digital download	3	18	16	5	6	37	4	19	12	4	FIN: 21,712	ARIA: Gold; IFPI FIN: Gold; IFPI SWI: Gold; RIAA: 2× Platinum; RMNZ: Platinum; SNEP: 2× Gold
Contact!	Released: 24 July 2001; Label: Popular; Formats: CD, LP, cassette, digital download	17	—	—	—	—	—	—	—	—	—		
Eiffel 65	Released: 8 April 2003; Label: Universal International; Formats: CD, LP, cassette, digital download	13	—	—	—	—	—	—	—	—	—		
"—" denotes a recording that did not chart or was not released in that territory.

== Singles ==
=== As lead artist ===
List of singles, with selected chart positions and certifications, showing year released and album name
Title	Year	Peak chart positions										Certifications	Album
Title	Year	ITA	AUS	AUT	FRA	GER	NZ	SWE	SWI	UK	US	Certifications	Album
"Blue (Da Ba Dee)"	1998	3	1	1	1	1	1	1	1	1	6	FIMI: 2× Platinum; ARIA: 3× Platinum; BPI: 2× Platinum; BVMI: 5× Gold; IFPI AUT: Platinum; IFPI SWE: 3× Platinum; IFPI SWI: 2× Platinum; RMNZ: 2× Platinum; SNEP: Diamond	Europop
"Too Much of Heaven"	1999	2	50	30	6	35	49	52	22	—	—		Europop
"Move Your Body"	1999	1	4	1	1	4	6	8	2	3	—	ARIA: Platinum; BPI: Silver; BVMI: Gold; IFPI AUT: Gold; IFPI SWI: Gold; RMNZ: Gold; SNEP: Platinum	Europop
"One Goal"	2000	—	—	—	37	—	—	—	—	—	—		Contact!
"Back in Time"	2000	12	—	—	—	—	—	—	—	—	—		Contact!
"Brightly Shines" (ITA only)	2001	—	—	—	—	—	—	—	—	—	—		Contact!
"King Of Lullaby" (ITA only)	2001	—	—	—	—	—	—	—	—	—	—		Contact!
"I Dj With The Fire" (ITA only)	2001	—	—	—	—	—	—	—	—	—	—		Contact!
"Lucky (In My Life)"	2001	13	—	23	68	57	—	56	74	—	—		Contact!
"80's Stars"	2002	22	—	—	—	—	—	—	—	—	—		Contact!
"Cosa resterà (In a Song)"	2002	12	—	—	—	—	—	—	—	—	—		Eiffel 65
"Quelli che non hanno età"	2003	5	—	—	—	—	—	—	—	—	—		Eiffel 65
"Viaggia insieme a me"	2003	13	—	—	—	—	—	—	—	—	—		Eiffel 65
"Una notte e forse mai più"	2003	10	—	—	—	—	—	—	—	—	—		Eiffel 65
"Tu Credi"	2004	62	—	—	—	—	—	—	—	—	—		Eiffel 65
"Voglia di Dance All Night"	2004	24	—	—	—	—	—	—	—	—	—		Eiffel 65
"Panico" / "Critical"	2016	—	—	—	—	—	—	—	—	—	—		Non-album singles
"Bestiale" (with Loredana Bertè)	2024	—	—	—	—	—	—	—	—	—	—		Non-album singles
"Fare a meno di te" (with Guè)	2025	—	—	—	—	—	—	—	—	—	—		Non-album singles
"—" denotes a recording that did not chart or was not released in that territory.

=== As featured artist ===
List of singles, with selected chart positions and certifications, showing year released and album name
Title	Year	Peak chart positions		Certifications	Album
Title	Year	ITA	SWI	Certifications	Album
"Auto blu" (Shiva with Eiffel 65)	2020	1	96	FIMI: 2× Platinum	Non-album singles
"Heaven" (Boomdabash with Eiffel 65)	2022	31	—	FIMI: Platinum	Non-album singles
"—" denotes a recording that did not chart or was not released in that territory.

=== Promotional singles ===
Title	Year	Peak chart positions	Album
Title	Year	CAN	Album
"My Console" (SPA only)	2000	—	Europop
"Losing You" (CAN only)	2002	10	Contact!
"Elephants in Amsterdam" (NOR only)	2002	—	Non-album single

== Remixes ==
- 1999: Kim Lukas – "All I Really Want"
- 1999: Simone Jay – "Paradise"
- 1999: Bloodhound Gang – "The Bad Touch"
- 1999: Ann Lee – "Ring My Bell"
- 1999: 883 – "La Regina Del Celebrità"
- 1999: Andreas Johnson – "Glorious"
- 1999: Kool & The Gang – "Get Down On It"
- 1999: Nek – "La Vita E'"
- 1999: Aqua – "Freaky Friday"
- 2000: Stefano & Roger – "Let It Be The Night"
- 2000: Toni Braxton – "Spanish Guitar"
- 2000: Regina – "You And Me"
- 2000: Alex Party – "U Gotta Be"
- 2000: Unique II vs. Sheila Fernandez – "Forever"
- 2000: Piero Pelu – "Toro Loco"
- 2000: Anna Vissi – "Everything I Am"
- 2000: Peach – "Anywhere"
- 2000: Love Inc. – "Here Comes The Sunshine"
- 2000: S Club 7 – "Reach"
- 2000: Gala – "Everyone Has Inside"
- 2000: Jean Michel Jarre – "Tout Est Bleu"
- 2000: Dr. MacDoo – "Macahula Dance"
- 2000: superEva – "Thinking Of You"
- 2000: 833 – "Viaggio al centro del mondo"
- 2000: Lutricia McNeal – "Fly Away"
- 2000: Serge Gainsbourg & Jane Birkin – "Je T'aime"
- 2001: Vasco Rossi – "Ti Prendo E Ti Porto Via"
- 2001: Ana Bettz – "Black & White"
- 2001: Alphaville – "Big In Japan"
- 2001: Lilu – "Little Girl"
