= Un'altra Come Te =

Single by Bloom 06

from the album Crash Test 02
- Released: May 2, 2008 (Italy)
- Recorded: 2007–2008
- Genre: Dance
- Label: Blue Boys / Universal / Jet Set Records
- Producer(s): Jeffrey Jey, Maurizio Lobina

Bloom 06 singles chronology
"Per Sempre" (2007)	"Un'altra Come Te" (2008)

"Un'altra Come Te" is the first single from Bloom 06's second album Crash Test 02. The single was released on May 2, 2008.

The single only contains the original version of "Un'altra Come Te" on Crash Test 02, which has been released on May 23, 2008. Currently, the single is only available on iTunes, in January 2009 the English version, Being Not Like You has been physically released in Germany, Austria and Switzerland.

== Track listing ==
=== Un'altra Come Te ===
1. "Un'altra Come Te" - 3:50

=== Being Not Like You ===
1. "Being Not Like You" - 3:50
2. "Being Not Like You - Elektro Pop Remix" - 4:41
3. "Un'altra Come Te" - 3:50
4. "Blue (Da Ba Dee) - Bloom 06 extended concept" - 7:46
