= Endless Fashion =

2023 single by Lil Uzi Vert featuring Nicki Minaj

Single by Lil Uzi Vert featuring Nicki Minaj

from the album Pink Tape
- Released: June 30, 2023
- Recorded: 2022
- Genre: Avant-pop
- Length: 3:36
- Label: Atlantic; Generation Now
- Songwriters: Symere Woods; Onika Maraj; Daniel Perez; Gianfranco Randone; Massimo Gabutti; Maurizio Lobina; Ivison Smith; Keion Williams
- Producers: Bugz Ronin; Ike Beatz

Lil Uzi Vert singles chronology
"Supposed to Be Loved" (2023)	"Endless Fashion" (2023)	"NFL" (2023)

Nicki Minaj singles chronology
"Barbie World" (2023)	"Endless Fashion" (2023)	"Last Time I Saw You" (2023)

Audio video
- "Endless Fashion" on YouTube

"Endless Fashion" is a song by American rapper and singer Lil Uzi Vert featuring rapper Nicki Minaj. It was released on August 18, 2023, as the second single from the former's third studio album Pink Tape (2023). Produced by Bugz Ronin, it contains an interpolation of "Blue (Da Ba Dee)" by Eiffel 65.

== Background ==
Following the release of the song and album, Lil Uzi Vert's girlfriend JT of City Girls asked Nicki Minaj on Twitter how she turned in her verse so fast. Minaj replied:

Girl I started @ 8am & finished like 5pm. When I tell you I was exhausted by the time I was done. Lol. B/c I was rushing to get it in on time. I kept telling him "30 mins" then hitting him back 2 hours later TB 15-20 more minutes Uzi!!!! 😩I did that ALL DAY LONG YO 🤣

== Composition and lyrics ==
The song is built around an interpolation of "Blue (Da Ba Dee)" by Italian electronic music group Eiffel 65, created by faint synth pads, while the production also contains minimal hi-hats, snares, and kicks in the drum pattern and occasional high-pitched synth keys. Lyrically, the artists boast about using various luxury brands in their lifestyles. In the second verse, Nicki Minaj highlights certain brands of the sort, including Chanel, Fendi and Burberry, as well as celebrities such as Natalie Nunn, Karl Lagerfeld, Dapper Dan, Virgil Abloh and Lionel Messi. In addition, she name-drops her alter egos Harajuku Barbie, Roman Zolanski, Red Ruby and Chun-Li. Similarly, Lil Uzi Vert also shouts out to a number of labels: "These rappers can't dress, yeah, they just be hatin' / I never ratted, but got all the statements / Stopped wearing Kapital 'cause it got basic / I still wear Kapital, Uzi, stop fakin' / I used to wear more Number (N)ine than Asians / I mix the Greg Lauren, purple label".

Robin Murray of Clash described the song as "sheer avant-garde pop music, accessible, bold, and free."

== Critical reception ==
Gabriel Bras Nevares of HotNewHipHop commented that the rappers trade "ridiculous bars, clever wordplay" and praised the production, writing "As such, it makes for quite the dreamy and spacey cut that doesn't take itself too seriously, but ensures that the vibe of the track goes further than its novelty. What's more is that both artists come through with some sharp bars and melodic phrases to fill the track up, especially Nicki." Reviewing Pink Tape for Slant Magazine, Paul Attard described the song as "the clearest example of Uzi engaging in gonzo stunts with little discernible payoff" and stated, "But even these blunders still offer some interesting quirks, including the utterly obnoxious way Uzi belts out 'I got a Chinеse girl, yeah, she from Shanghai' on 'Endless Fashion,' where they stress the 'ang' in 'Shanghai' for so long that it seems as if they've forgotten the rest of the lyrics." Matthew Ritchie of Pitchfork gave a less favorable review, writing "The slowed-down interpolation of Eiffel 65's 'I'm Blue' on 'Endless Fashion' lacks the sample's rambunctious energy, making it feel lackluster, even if Nicki Minaj delivers a solid feature."

== Track listing ==
- Streaming/digital download – versions
1. "Endless Fashion" (explicit version, sped up) – 3:12
2. "Endless Fashion" (explicit version, slowed down) – 4:10
3. "Endless Fashion" (clean version, sped up) – 3:12
4. "Endless Fashion" (clean version, slowed down) – 4:10

== Charts ==
=== Weekly charts ===
Weekly chart performance for "Endless Fashion"
Chart (2023)	Peak position
Canada Hot 100 (Billboard)	39
Global 200 (Billboard)	33
New Zealand Hot Singles (RMNZ)	3
UK Singles (Official Charts)	75
US Billboard Hot 100	20
US Hot R&B/Hip-Hop Songs (Billboard)	9
US R&B/Hip-Hop Airplay (Billboard)	23
US Rhythmic Airplay (Billboard)	10

=== Year-end charts ===
Year-end chart performance for "Endless Fashion"
Chart (2023)	Position
US Hot R&B/Hip-Hop Songs (Billboard)	97

== Release history ==
Release dates and formats for "Endless Fashion"
Region	Date	Format(s)	Label(s)	Ref.
Various	August 18, 2023	Digital download; streaming	Generation Now; Atlantic	
Italy	September 30, 2023	Radio airplay	Warner	
