= Auto blu =

Single by Shiva featuring Eiffel 65
- Released: 26 March 2020
- Length: 2:46
- Label: Jive
- Composers: Davide Maddalena; Maurizio Lobina; Gianfranco Randone
- Lyricists: Andrea Arrigoni; Maurizio Lobina; Massimo Gabutti
- Producer: Adam11

Shiva singles chronology
"Gange" (2020)	"Auto blu" (2020)	"Chic" (2020)

Eiffel 65 singles chronology
"Panico" (2016)	"Auto blu" (2020)	"Heaven" (2022)

"Auto blu" ("Blue Car", a term also referring to any car used by public officials) is a song by Italian rapper Shiva, which was released on 26 March 2020.

It features a sample from "Blue (Da Ba Dee)" by Eiffel 65, who are credited as guest artists. A remix produced by Gabry Ponte was released on 8 May 2020.

The song topped the Italian singles chart and was certified double platinum.

== Track listing ==
Digital download – Standard edition
No.	Title	Length
1.	"Auto blu"	2:46

Digital download – Auto blu EP Remix
No.	Title	Length
1.	"Auto blu"	2:46
2.	"Auto blu – Remix" (Gabry Ponte Remix)	3:10
3.	"Auto blu (Some Say) – Remix" (Nea Remix)	2:46
4.	"Auto blu – Remix" (Ardian Bujupi Remix)	2:59

== Charts ==
=== Weekly charts ===
Chart performance for "Auto blu"
Chart (2020)	Peak position
Italy (FIMI)	1
Italy Airplay (EarOne)	64
Switzerland (Schweizer Hitparade)	96

=== Year-end charts ===
2020 year-end chart performance for "Auto blu"
Chart	Position
Italy (FIMI)	32

== Certifications ==
Region	Certification	Certified units/sales
Italy (FIMI)	2× Platinum	140,000^{‡}
^{‡} Sales+streaming figures based on certification alone.
