= Crash Test 02 =

Studio album by Bloom 06
- Released: 23 May 2008 (Italy)
- Recorded: 2007–2008
- Genre: Electronica, Eurodance, Italo disco
- Length: 42:33
- Label: Blue Boys (label)
- Producer: Jeffrey Jey, Maurizio Lobina

Bloom 06 chronology
Crash Test 01 (2006)	Crash Test 02 (2008)	Club Test 01 (2008)

Singles from Crash Test 02
- 1. "Un'altra come te" Released: 2 May 2008

Crash Test 02 is the second and final album by Italian band Bloom 06. After many delays, the album was finally released on 23 May 2008. Like their first album, Crash Test 01, this album features lyrics in both English and Italian.

== Crash Test 02 previews ==
Prior to the album's release, Bloom 06 released multiple previews of various songs from their album on their MySpace page. The first song was Between the Lines, on 12 February 2008. After strong response from their fans, 3 other previews were added, Anche solo per un attimo, Un'altra come te, and Welcome to the Zoo.

After the album's release, You're Amazing and Fall were added to the available preview list.

== Singles ==
"Un'altra come te" was the album's first single, released 2 May 2008. "Between the Lines" was featured as the first track on the band's EP "Club Test 01". An English version of "Un'altra come te" was released in January 2009.

=== Track list ===
No.	Title	English translation*	Length
1.	"Between the Lines"	-	6:01
2.	"Anche solo per un attimo"	Even for a Moment	4:08
3.	"Welcome to the Zoo"	-	4:19
4.	"Fall"	-	4:02
5.	"Here We Are"	-	5:15
6.	"Un'altra come te"	Being Not Like You	3:50
7.	"In Your Eyes"	-	3:43
8.	"Reaching for the Stars"	-	4:15
9.	"You're Amazing"	-	3:40
10.	"Nel buio tra di noi"	In the Darkness between Us	4:00

* English translations not official.
