= Viaggia insieme a me =

Song by Eiffel 65

Single by Eiffel 65

from the album Eiffel 65
- Released: 2003
- Genre: Eurodance
- Length: 3:44 (radio edit); 4:25 (album version)
- Label: Bliss Corporation

Eiffel 65 singles chronology
"Quelli che non hanno età" (2003)	"Viaggia insieme a me" (2003)	"Viaggia insieme a me RMX" (2003)

Music video
- "Viaggia insieme a me" on YouTube

"Viaggia insieme a me" (transl. "Travel with me") is a single from Eiffel 65's third album Eiffel 65.

== Background ==
Keyboardist Maurizio Lobina wrote the song a year before his son's birth. The song reached #13 on the Italian Singles Chart

The lyrics depict a father's journey of teaching his son and looking after him, until the day comes when the son is able to live on his own. The final lines project a future when the son will become a father and will likewise teach his child.

== Music video ==
The music video for the song features a boy waking up from sleep, putting on his shirt and eating with his dad, and a shot of Maurizio Lobina afterward, the boy walking, and then a shot of Jeffrey Jey and Gabry Ponte, the clip goes to 2 bullies walking to the kid, and then a shot of Jeffrey Jey and Maurizio Lobina afterwards they hit him with a ball that hits his head he looks and sees the bullies getting closer, he picks up the ball and tries giving to them, they scare him and then they both chase until a bully catches his shoulder, then a shot of Jeffrey Jey, Gabry Ponte, and Maurizio Lobina the clip goes the kid with his dad, recovering from that ball hit, then they learn karate together, the clip fades to the kid smiling in front of the 2 bullies, they notice him and throws the ball they were playing at him, the kid catches the ball, they were in shock and then the kid goes to them and almost break their hand, then a shot of Maurizio Lobina depicting that the kid was him then a shot of the other 2 crew of the member, the kid hands them the ball them smile together they give them the ball back, the kid throws the ball up, and they walk and play before enging the video

The video also features the band walking down a gravel road.

== Track listing ==
1. Viaggia insieme a me (Fm Edit) - 3:44
2. Viaggia insieme a me (Album Mix) - 4:26
3. Viaggia insieme a me (Roberto Molinaro Radio Cut) - 4:24

== Remixes and alternate versions ==
"Viaggia insieme a me RMX"

Single by Eiffel 65
- Released: 2003
- Genre: Eurodance
- Length: 4:24
- Label: Bliss Corporation

Eiffel 65 singles chronology
"Viaggia insieme a me" (2003)	"Viaggia insieme a me RMX" (2003)	"Una notte e forse mai più" (2003)

- After "Viaggia insieme a me" peaked, the Roberto Molinaro Radio Concept, called "Viaggia insieme a me RMX," was released as a single, but it failed to chart. It is featured on the second disc of the 2004 re-release of Eiffel 65.
- This song has also been released by Eiffel 65 with English lyrics called "Follow Me", a version which was included in the album Eiffel 65 (Special Edition).

== Chart positions ==
=== Weekly charts ===
Chart (2003)	Peak position
Italy (FIMI)	13

=== Year-end charts ===
Chart (2003)	Position
Italy (FIMI)	48
