= Move Your Body (Eiffel 65 song) =

1999 single by Eiffel 65

Single by Eiffel 65

from the album Europop
- Released: 4 November 1999
- Genre: Bubblegum techno; disco
- Length: 4:28 (album version); 3:30 (radio and video edit)
- Label: WEA
- Songwriters: Domenico Capuano; Roberto Molinaro; Maurizio Lobina; Gianfranco Randone; Massimo Gabutti
- Producers: Massimo Gabutti; Luciano Zucchet

Eiffel 65 singles chronology
"Too Much of Heaven" (1999)	"Move Your Body" (1999)	"My Console" (2000)

Music video
- "Move Your Body" on YouTube

"Move Your Body" is a song by Italian musical group Eiffel 65. It was released as the third single from their debut album, Europop, on 4 November 1999.

== Composition ==
Move Your Body
The song's chorus

"Move Your Body" is a bubblegum techno and disco song played in D minor at 130 BPM. It has dance-oriented sounds and uses the same pitch shifter–based distortion as the vocals from the previous single, "Blue (Da Ba Dee)". Group member Jeffrey Jey claimed that the song "had tried to recall the original spirit of the dance, understood as a vehicle to bring together and communicate with people."

== Critical reception ==
Entertainment Weekly said in a review of Europop that it was hard to call "Move Your Body" a "timeless masterpiece," but it was impossible to hate it. Billboard called it a "kitschy electronic number" and commented on "the song's catchy melody, addictive lyrical redundancy, and the familiar computerized voice of the trio's Jeffrey Jey".

== Commercial performance ==
While the single was issued through WEA Records in Italy, it was licensed to several labels for international release. In the UK, it was licensed to Warner Music Group's Eternal label, in the US to Universal Music Group's Republic, in Germany to BMG Berlin, in France to Scorpio, in Spain to Blanco y Negro, in Australia to Central Station, and to Valentine and Avex in Southeast Asia.

The song achieved huge success in many countries, topping the charts of Austria, Denmark, France, Italy and Spain; however it charted at only number 36 on the US Billboard Top 40 Mainstream.

Elia Habib, an expert of the French charts, noted the great efficiency of the song on the SNEP chart, since it was strong enough to dislodge the massive hit "Mambo No. 5 (A Little Bit Of...)" by Lou Bega and to resist to its competitors, which prevented Eiffel 65 to remain a one-hit wonder, and enabled the band to become the first one to get its second number one single in France.

== Music video ==
Some of the characters as seen dancing in the video.

The music video is sort of a sequel to the music video for “Blue (Da Ba Dee)”, as it features the same blue aliens (their leader being named Zorotl). The band has a concert on the planet of the blue aliens, when a group of hostiles capture a female alien. The band (with the help of Zorotl) use a teleportation device to search for her. When they find her, the hostiles join the concert.

== Track listings ==
CD maxi 1 - Germany

1. "Move Your Body" (D.J. Gabry Ponte original radio edit) — 4:30
2. "Move Your Body" (D.J. Gabry Ponte original club mix) — 5:54
3. "Move Your Body" (D.J. Gregory Kolla & Alex X Funk Claywork mix) — 6:20
4. "Move Your Body" (D.J. Gabry Ponte speed cut) — 5:32

CD maxi 2 - Germany

1. "Move Your Body" (D.J. Gabry Ponte original video edit) — 3:30
2. "Move Your Body" (D.J. Gabry Ponte speed radio cut) — 3:31
3. "Move Your Body" (D.J. Gabry Ponte original club mix) — 5:54
4. "Move Your Body" (Roby Molinaro forge edit) — 7:03
5. "Blue (Da Ba Dee)" (Molinaro parade German cut) — 2:47

CD maxi - UK

1. "Move Your Body" (D.J. Gabry Ponte edit) — 3:29
2. "Move Your Body" (D.J. Gabry Ponte original club mix) — 5:55
3. "Move Your Body" (album sampler megamix) — 6:07

CD single

1. "Move Your Body" (D.J. Gabry Ponte original video edit) — 3:30
2. "Move Your Body" (D.J. Gabry Ponte original club mix) — 5:54

12-inch maxi - Spain

1. "Move Your Body" (D.J. Gabry Ponte original club mix) — 5:45
2. "Move Your Body" (D.J. Gabry Ponte speed cut) — 5:31
3. "Move Your Body" (Roby Molinaro forge edit) — 7:03

12-inch maxi - UK

1. "Move Your Body" (D.J. Gabry Ponte original club mix) — 5:55
2. "Move Your Body" (D.J. Gregory Kolla & Alex X Funk Claywork mix) — 6:25
3. "Move Your Body" (Roby Molinaro forge edit) — 7:03
4. "Move Your Body" (casino machine Paris dub) — 7:01

== Charts ==
=== Weekly charts ===
Weekly chart performance
Chart (1999–2000)	Peak position
Australia (ARIA)	4
Austria (Ö3 Austria Top 40)	1
Belgium (Ultratop 50 Flanders)	15
Belgium (Ultratop 50 Wallonia)	4
Canada Top Singles (RPM)	7
Canada Dance/Urban (RPM)	1
Canada (Nielsen SoundScan)	4
Czech Republic (IFPI)	34
Denmark (IFPI)	1
Europe (Eurochart Hot 100)	1
European Radio Top 50 (Music & Media)	6
European Border Breakers (Music & Media)	1
European Dance Traxx (Music & Media)	1
Finland (Suomen virallinen lista)	10
France (SNEP)	1
Germany (GfK)	4
Hungary (Mahasz)	5
Iceland (Íslenski Listinn Topp 40)	29
Ireland (IRMA)	4
Italy (FIMI)	1
Italian Airplay (Music & Media)	2
Netherlands (Dutch Top 40)	19
Netherlands (Single Top 100)	19
New Zealand (Recorded Music NZ)	6
Norway (VG-lista)	20
Scottish Singles Sales (Official Charts)	3
Spain (Promusicae)	3
Sweden (Sverigetopplistan)	8
Switzerland (Schweizer Hitparade)	2
UK Singles (Official Charts)	3
US Pop Airplay (Billboard)	36

=== Year-end charts ===
Year-end chart performance
Chart (1999)	Position
European Border Breakers (Music & Media)	97
Italy (Musica e dischi)	93

Chart (2000)	Position
Australia (ARIA)	33
Austria (Ö3 Austria Top 40)	10
Belgium (Ultratop 50 Wallonia)	34
Denmark (IFPI)	19
Europe (Eurochart Hot 100)	6
Europe Radio Top 50 (Music & Media)	68
European Border Breakers (Music & Media)	12
France (SNEP)	13
Germany (Media Control)	31
Ireland (IRMA)	57
Italy (Musica e dischi) Episode 1 / "Move Your Body"	9
Netherlands (Dutch Top 40)	122
Switzerland (Schweizer Hitparade)	20
UK Singles (OCC)	77

== Certifications ==
Certifications and sales
Region	Certification	Certified units/sales
Australia (ARIA)	Platinum	70,000^{^}
Austria (IFPI Austria)	Gold	25,000^{*}
Belgium (BRMA)	Gold	25,000^{*}
Denmark	—	7,003
France (SNEP)	Platinum	500,000^{*}
Germany (BVMI)	Gold	250,000^{^}
New Zealand (RMNZ)	Gold	5,000^{*}
Switzerland (IFPI Switzerland)	Gold	25,000^{^}
United Kingdom (BPI)	Silver	200,000^{‡}
^{*} Sales figures based on certification alone.^{^} Shipments figures based on certification alone.^{‡} Sales+streaming figures based on certification alone.

== Release history ==
Release dates and formats for "Move Your Body"
Region	Date	Format(s)	Label(s)	Ref.
Italy	November 1999	CD	WEA	
Spain	4 November 1999	12-inch vinyl	Blanco y Negro	
Sweden	22 November 1999	CD	Logic	
Europe	30 November 1999	CD	Logic	
France	2 December 1999	12-inch vinyl; CD	Hot Tracks	
Canada	18 January 2000	CD	Popular	
United Kingdom	7 February 2000	CD; cassette	Eternal	
United States	4 April 2000	Rhythmic contemporary; contemporary hit radio	Universal; Republic	
Japan	24 May 2000	CD	Polydor	

== See also ==
- List of number-one hits of 2000 (Austria)
- List of number-one hits of 2000 (France)
- List of number-one hits of 2000 (Italy)
- List of European number-one hits of 2000
