= Europop (album) =

Studio album by Eiffel 65
- Released: 22 November 1999
- Recorded: 1998–1999
- Genres: Italo dance; Eurodance
- Length: 65:35
- Labels: Bliss; Universal; Republic
- Producers: Maurizio Lobina; Gabry Ponte; Gianfranco Randone; Dom Capuano; Alessandro Topuntoli; Mauro Di Deco; Claudio Dettori; Massimo Gabutti (ex.); Luciano Zacchet (ex.)

Eiffel 65 chronology
Europop (1999)	Contact! (2001)

Alternative cover

Singles from Europop
- 1. "Blue (Da Ba Dee)" Released: October 1998; 2. "Too Much of Heaven" Released: 11 May 1999; 3. "Move Your Body" Released: 4 November 1999; 4. "My Console" Released: 2000

Europop is the debut studio album by Italian electronic group Eiffel 65. The album was released in late 1999 as under Bliss Corporation and Universal Records and Republic Music (Universal and Republic would merge to Universal Republic). The album is most notable for the group's two biggest hits: "Blue (Da Ba Dee)" and "Move Your Body," which topped the charts worldwide in 2000.

== Background ==
The title of Europop describes its genre; it combines several dance styles unique to European countries, such as the United Kingdom's trip hop, Germany's techno, and Italy's dance music, and songs are structured like typical pop songs. The album follows a deep house template featuring vocoder vocal effects, synthesizer hooks, and "nursery rhyme choruses," with occasional deviations from it into string-orchestrated hip-hop ("Living in a Bubble") and "trippy" house stylings ("Now is Forever" and "Europop"). Elements of 1980s synthpop dominate, with reviews making comparisons to Depeche Mode (especially towards "Your Clown"), Erasure, a-ha, and Duran Duran.

The album features pitch-corrected vocals and Euro disco beats throughout. Eiffel 65 perform all the songs on this album in English.

== Reception ==
Professional ratings
Review scores
Source	Rating
AllMusic	3/5 stars
Courier News	0/4 stars
Entertainment Weekly	C+
Houston Chronicle	2.5/4 stars
Los Angeles Daily News	2.5/4 stars
PopMatters	8/10
Rolling Stone	3/5 stars
The San Diego Union-Tribune	1.5/4 stars

Contemporaneous reviews from Entertainment Weekly, the Houston Chronicle, and The Plain Dealer welcomed the humorous, light-weight dance-pop style of Europop in a pop music market saturated with mostly dour music, calling serious cuts such as "Your Clown" and "Now is Forever" the LP's weakest. Reviews from The Plain Dealer and Rolling Stone also appreciated its rejection of intellectual pretentiousness common in electronic music. On the other hand, the album was criticized for a lack of differentiation (in composition and production techniques) between songs, with Jose F. Promis writing its best moments came when it combined its template with different genres. In his review for Courier News, Tab Benoit called Eiffel 65 a "one-trick pony" for using the same vocal effect for all tracks.

The album peaked at number four on the Billboard 200 in the United States, and the song "Blue (Da Ba Dee)" peaked at number six on the Billboard Hot 100, impressive for an EDM song at the time of its release. In February 2000, the album was certified two-times platinum by the Recording Industry Association of America (RIAA) for shipments of two million copies in the US.

== Track listing ==
Original issue
No.	Title	Lyrics	Music	Producer(s)	Length
1.	"Too Much of Heaven" (album mix)	Massimo Gabutti; Gianfranco Randone	Maurizio Lobina; Randone	Lobina	5:17
2.	"Dub In Life" (album edit)	Lobina; Roberto Molinaro	Lobina; Randone; Gabutti	Lobina; Gabry Ponte	3:57
3.	"Blue (Da Ba Dee)" (DJ Gabry Ponte radio edit)	Gabutti; Lobina	Lobina; Randone	Ponte; Lobina	4:43
4.	"Living in a Bubble" (album mix) (featuring Papa Winnie)	Randone; Winston Carlisle Peters; Gabutti	Lobina; Randone; Ponte; Gabutti	Randone; Lobina	5:03
5.	"Move Your Body" (DJ Gabry Ponte original radio edit)	Randone; Gabutti	Dom Capuano; Lobina; Molinaro	Lobina; Ponte	4:28
6.	"My Console" (DJ Gabry Ponte Console mix)	Ponte; Randone	Lobina; Randone	Lobina; Ponte	4:13
7.	"Your Clown" (Slow mix)	Lobina; Gabutti; Capuano	Lobina; Randone	Capuano	4:09
8.	"Another Race" (album edit)	Lobina; Randone; Ponte; Gabutti	Lobina; Randone	Lobina; Ponte	4:34
9.	"The Edge" (album mix)	Randone	Randone; Lobina; Gabutti; Molinaro	Randone	4:20
10.	"Now Is Forever" (Electronic Ballad mix)	Randone; Capuano	Lobina; Randone; Gabutti	Capuano	5:44
11.	"Silicon World" (Main mix)	Randone; Gabutti	Alessandro Topuntoli	Ponte; Topuntoli	4:31
12.	"Europop" (Album Kraft mix)	Randone; Gabutti	Mauro Di Deco; Claudio Dettori	Di Deco; Dettori	5:26
13.	"Hyperlink (Deep Down)" (album cut)	Randone	Lobina; Di Deco; Gabutti	Di Deco; Lobina	4:57

US version
No.	Title	Lyrics	Music	Producer(s)	Length
1.	"Blue (Da Ba Dee)" (radio edit)	Massimo Gabutti; Maurizio Lobina	Lobina; Gianfranco Randone	Gabry Ponte; Lobina	3:29
2.	"Too Much of Heaven"	Gabutti; Randone	Lobina; Randone	Lobina	5:17
3.	"Dub in Life"	Lobina; Roberto Molinaro	Lobina; Randone; Gabutti	Lobina; Ponte	3:57
4.	"Living in a Bubble" (featuring Papa Winnie)	Randone; Winston Carlisle Peters; Gabutti	Lobina; Randone; Ponte; Gabutti	Randone; Lobina	5:03
5.	"Move Your Body"	Randone; Gabutti	Dom Capuano; Lobina; Molinaro	Lobina; Ponte	4:28
6.	"My Console"	Ponte; Randone	Lobina; Randone	Lobina; Ponte	4:13
7.	"Your Clown"	Lobina; Gabutti; Capuano	Lobina; Randone	Capuano	4:09
8.	"Another Race"	Lobina; Randone; Ponte; Gabutti	Lobina; Randone	Lobina; Ponte	4:34
9.	"The Edge"	Randone	Randone; Lobina; Gabutti; Molinaro	Randone	4:20
10.	"Now Is Forever"	Randone; Capuano	Lobina; Randone; Gabutti	Capuano	5:44
11.	"Silicon World"	Randone; Gabutti	Alessandro Topuntoli	Ponte; Topuntoli	4:31
12.	"Europop"	Randone; Gabutti	Mauro Di Deco; Claudio Dettori	Di Deco; Dettori	5:28
13.	"Hyperlink (Deep Down)"	Randone	Lobina; Di Deco; Gabutti	Di Deco; Lobina	4:57
14.	"Blue (Da Ba Dee)" (extended mix)	Gabutti; Lobina	Lobina; Randone	Ponte; Lobina	4:46

Australian Bonus Disc
No.	Title	Length
1.	"Nick Skitz Eiffel 65 Megamix"	7:35
2.	"Blue (Da Ba Dee)" (extended mix)	6:29
3.	"Blue (Da Ba Dee)" (Molinaro Parade German cut)	2:48
4.	"Blue (Da Ba Dee)" (TJM Bluemax 04 Extension remix)	6:37
5.	"Move Your Body" (Paris remix)	7:04
6.	"Move Your Body" (Claywork remix)	6:28
7.	"Europop" (Parade mix)	5:14

== Personnel ==
Credits adapted from the album's liner notes. The track numbers correspond to the US release.

Eiffel 65

- Jeffrey Jey – vocals
- Maurizio Lobina – keyboards, programming
- Gabry Ponte – DJ, mixing

Additional personnel

- Angelica Villella – mixing (1, 2, 4–8, 10, 14)
- Mauro Di Deco – mixing (3, 9, 11–13)
- Chris Zippel – mastering
- Massimo Gabutti – executive producer
- Luciano Zucchet – executive producer

== Charts ==
=== Weekly charts ===
Weekly chart performance for Europop
Chart (1999–2000)	Peak position
Australian Albums (ARIA)	18
Austrian Albums (Ö3 Austria)	16
Canadian Albums (Billboard)	5
Danish Albums (Hitlisten)	7
European Albums (Music & Media)	18
Finnish Albums (Suomen virallinen lista)	8
French Albums (SNEP)	6
German Albums (Offizielle Top 100)	37
Hungarian Albums (MAHASZ)	3
Irish Albums (IRMA)	38
Italian Albums (FIMI)	13
New Zealand Albums (RMNZ)	4
Portuguese Albums (AFP)	6
Swiss Albums (Schweizer Hitparade)	19
UK Albums (Official Charts)	12
US Billboard 200	4

=== Year-end charts ===
Year-end chart performance for Europop
Chart (2000)	Peak position
Australian Albums (ARIA)	97
Canadian Albums (Nielsen SoundScan)	49
Danish Albums (Hitlisten)	63
European Albums (Music & Media)	78
French Albums (SNEP)	52
New Zealand Albums (RMNZ)	50
Swiss Albums (Schweizer Hitparade)	86
UK Albums (OCC)	235
US Billboard 200	29

== Certifications ==
Certifications and sales for Europop
Region	Certification	Certified units/sales
Argentina (CAPIF)	Gold	30,000^{^}
Australia (ARIA)	Gold	35,000^{^}
Canada (Music Canada)	Platinum	100,000^{^}
Denmark (IFPI Danmark)	Gold	25,000^{^}
Finland (Musiikkituottajat)	Gold	21,712
France (SNEP)	2× Gold	200,000^{*}
Hungary (MAHASZ)	Gold	
New Zealand (RMNZ)	Platinum	15,000^{^}
Poland (ZPAV)	Gold	50,000^{*}
United States (RIAA)	2× Platinum	2,000,000^{^}
^{*} Sales figures based on certification alone.^{^} Shipments figures based on certification alone.
