= Dom Capuano =

Italian composer and sound supervisor

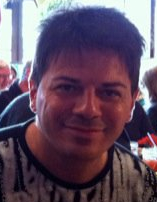
- Dom Capuano

Background information
- Born: Domenico Capuano; 21 April 1975 (age 51); Turin, Italy
- Genres: EDM, electro, pop, film scores, video game scores
- Occupations: Music Composer, Record producer, Sound Supervisor, Sound Designer, Re-Recording Mixer, Foley Artist, Songwriter
- Instruments: Piano, keyboards, synthesizer, double bass
- Years active: 1993–present
- Labels: Republic Records (1999–2005), Universal Music (2000–2005), Epic (2000–2005), Warner Music (2004–Current), EMI (2006–2009), Sony Music (2000–2005), Downtown Music Publishing (2014–Current), Cleopatra Records (2012–2019), Dom Capuano Music Publishing (2012–Present), Andronic Records (2014–Present), Bliss Corporation (1993–2011),
- Website: domcapuano.com

Dom Capuano (born Domenico Capuano, 21 April 1975) is an Italian composer, record producer, and songwriter. He is known for his work in electronic dance music and pop during the late 1990s and early 2000s. From the 2010s onward, his activities have expanded to include composing music for film, television, and video games, as well as working as a sound supervisor, sound designer, re-recording mixer, and Foley artist for multimedia productions.

Capuano contributed to several internationally successful projects, including releases by Eiffel 65 and collaborations with artists such as Gabry Ponte and Karmah. Alongside his ongoing work in music production, he has increasingly focused on scoring independent and international screen productions.

== Early life and career ==
Capuano studied music at the Giuseppe Verdi Conservatory in Turin, where he focused on double bass. He later expanded his training to include piano, composition, and conducting.

During the early 1990s, he began working as a composer and record producer within the Italian dance music scene. In 1993, he composed "Let Me Be" for Da Blitz, which entered the Italian music charts. Additional releases followed throughout the decade, leading to further chart appearances in Italy and Europe.

== Worldwide recognition ==
The album Europop by Eiffel 65 was released internationally in 1999 and reached number four on the U.S. Billboard 200 chart. The album was distributed worldwide and achieved multi-platinum certifications in several countries.

In 2001, Eiffel 65 received a Grammy Award nomination for their commercial success during this period.

== Italian pop music ==
In 2006, Capuano began collaborating with the Italian band dARI as a producer and co-author. In February 2008, the band achieved national success with the single "Wale (Tanto Wale)". The song received several industry recognitions, including the Italian Revelation Video of the Year award in 2008 and MTV TRL Awards for Best New Artist (2009) and Best Look (2010).

In 2010, Capuano produced the Italian rock band Fonokit. In the same period, he completed further studies in music conducting, after which he relocated to the United States to pursue work in film and television scoring.

== Film scoring and Hollywood ==
From the mid-2000s, Capuano began working in film and television composition. Among his early works are the score for the medium-length film Calibro 70 (2008) and the Disney Channel Italy television series Chiamatemi Giò (2009).

In the following years, he composed music for international film, television, and video game productions. His more widely distributed works include Richard the Lionheart: Rebellion (2015) and Enter the Fire (2018).

He later composed music for Snow White's Christmas Adventure (2023) and The Magic Penguin (2024), both directed by Stefano Milla.

He has also worked on documentaries, television series, and video game projects for the international market, and continues to be active across film, television, video games, and pop music.

== Other works ==
In addition to commercial releases, Capuano has composed music for short films produced within academic settings. These projects include collaborations with students from institutions such as the University of Southern California (USC), the University of California, Los Angeles (UCLA), the New York Film Academy (NYFA), the American Film Institute (AFI), and the Hollywood International Film Academy (HIFA).

== Awards and certifications ==
Capuano has received multiple industry certifications in connection with releases by Eiffel 65 and other artists. These include RIAA multi-platinum certifications in the United States, as well as platinum and gold certifications in Australia, Germany, France, and the United Kingdom.

== Discography ==
=== Albums ===
Selected albums from sales chart rankings:

- 1999 – Europop – Eiffel 65
- 2001 – Contact! – Eiffel 65
- 2003 – Eiffel 65 – Eiffel 65
- 2002 – Gabry Ponte – Gabry Ponte
- 2004 – Dr. Jekyll and Mr. DJ – Gabry Ponte
- 2006 – Be Good to Me – Karmah
- 2008 – sOtToVuOtO GeNeRaZiOnAlE – dARI
- 2008 – Gabry2o – Gabry Ponte
- 2009 – sOtToVuOtO D-Version – dARI
- 2010 – In Testa – dARI
- 2011 – Amore o Purgatorio – Fonokit

=== Singles ===
Selected singles from sales chart rankings:

- 1993 – "Let Me Be" – N.1 Italy Dance Charts
- 1994 – "Take My Way" – N.1 Italy Dance Charts
- 1995 – "Stay with Me" – N.1 Italy Pop Charts, – N.70 European Hot 100 Singles
- 1995 – "Movin' On" – N.94 European Hot 100 Singles
- 1995 – "Take Me Back" – N.75 European Hot 100 Singles
- 1995 – "You Make Me Cry" – N.1 Italy Dance Charts
- 2000 – "Move Your Body" – N.1 by 20 countries in the World, such as the USA, Germany, France and the UK
- 2000 – "Europop" – N.3 Top Album Billboard Charts USA – 52 weeks on chart – 3x RIAA Platinum in the USA alone – more than 10 million sales worldwide.
- 2003 – "Quelli che non Hanno Età" – (Sanremo 2003) N.1 Italy Dance Charts N.3 Italy Top Charts
- 2004 – "The Man in The Moon" Italian Hit Performed by DJ Gabry Ponte N.1 Italy Dance Charts
- 2006 – "Ninja Turtles" – TV Cartoon Theme Soundtrack
- 2006 – "Just Be Good to Me" – N.1 Germany Top Charts
- 2008 – "Wale (Tanto Wale)" – Italian Hit by Dari – N.2 Italy Top Charts
- 2009 – "Non pensavo" – "dARI"' and "Max Pezzali" N.16 Italy Pop Charts
- 2009 – "Cercasi AAAmore" – N.9 Italy Pop Charts
- 2009 – "Casa casa mia" – N.15 Italy Pop Charts
- 2011 – "Non Esiste" – N.45 Italy Pop Charts
- 2017 – "Tu" – "Gabry Ponte feat. Umberto Tozzi"
- 2018 – "I Think I Love You" – N.41 Billboard Dance Charts – 6 weeks on chart

=== Solo albums and EP ===
- 2012 – The Journey to The Sacred Places (vo.1)
- 2012 – The Chinese Power
- 2013 – Lifexence
- 2014 – Zombeat in a Solid State
- 2016 – The Chinese Power 2016
- 2017 – TrailerTunes

== Soundtracks and film scoring ==
- 1998 – Poken Monster – Pokémon TV Theme Taiwan
- 2006 – Mutant Ninja Turtles (Ninja Turtles TV Theme) – TV RTI
- 2008 – AfterVille – The Underground Exhibition Movie, Turin
- 2008 – Calibro 70
- 2009 – Hey Giò (Chiamatemi Giò) – TV Theme – The Italian Edition of Ugly Betty by Disney Channel
- 2011 – Lourdes (Documentary)
- 2012 – The Sleeping Warrior
- 2013 – The Solid State
- 2014 – Beautiful Destroyer
- 2015 – Richard the Lionheart: Rebellion
- 2016 – Branded
- 2017 – Kingdom of Gladiators, the Tournament
- 2018 – Enter The Fire
- 2022 – Watergate: High Crimes in the White House
- 2023 – Beyond Skinwalker Ranch (S1)
- 2024 – Snow White's Christmas Adventure
- 2024 – Beyond Skinwalker Ranch (S2)
- 2024 – The Magic Penguin

== Remixes and cooperations ==
- Tout est Bleu – Jean Michel Jarre in collaboration with Jean Michel Jarre
- All Over – Onyx ft Busta Rhymes
- Freaky Friday – Aqua
- Reach – S Club 7
- The Bad Touch – Bloodhound Gang
- Get Down On It RMX – Kool & The Gang
- Il mio sbaglio più grande – Laura Pausini
- Big in Japan RMX – Alphaville
- Come Mai – 883
- La Donna il Sogno e Il Grande Incubo – 883
- La Regina Del Celebrità – 883
- "Viaggio al centro del mondo" – 883
- Everyone Has Inside – Gala
- Ring My Bell – Ann Lee
- Paradise – Simone Jay
- Anywhere – Peach
- U Gotta Be – Alex Party
- Little Girl – Lilù
- Thinkin' Of You – Super Eva
- You And Me – Regina
- All I Really Want – Kim Lukas
- Who Let The Dogs Out? – Baha Men
- Glorious – Andreas Johnson
- Black And White – Ana Bettz
- Thinkin Of You – Supereva
- Here Comes The Sunshine – Love Inc.

== Awards ==
- RIAA 3× Platinum (2000)
- Bundesverband Musikindustrie Platinum (2000)
- ARIA Platinum and Gold (2000–2001)
- SNEP Platinum (2000)

== See also ==
- Europop (album)
