= Ellos (song) =

2019 song by Ceky Viciny

Single by Ceky Viciny
- Released: March 11, 2019
- Genre: Dembow
- Length: 2:55

"Ellos" (They) is a song by the Dominican urban artist Ceky Viciny, released on March 11, 2019. A remix version was released on April 19, 2019, featuring Secreto El Famoso Biberon. The song borrows from the Eiffel 65 song "Blue".

== Music video ==
The video was released on March 11, 2019. The video has about 10 million views on YouTube and was recorded in the Dominican Republic.

"Ellos"

Remix by Ceky Viciny Featuring Secreto el Famoso Biberon
- Released: April 19, 2019
- Genre: Dembow
- Length: 4:18
- Producer: B one X Dj Sammy

== Commercial performance ==
The song became one of the first songs of the Dominican Urban Movement to have commercial success outside of the Dominican Republic. In Spain, the remix version debuted at 62, becoming Ceky and Secreto's first entry in that chart. Meanwhile, the original version peaked at 15 in Dominican Republic Urban Charts.

== Charts ==
Chart (2019)	Peak position
Dominican Republic Urban Chart (Monitor Latino)	15
Spain (PROMUSICAE)	26
Spain (PROMUSICAE) Ellos (Remix)	62
