= Randone =

Randone is a surname of Italian origin. Notable people with the surname include:

- Jeffrey Jey (real name Gianfranco Randone; born 1970), Italian-American musician and singer-songwriter
- Salvo Randone (1906–1991), Italian actor
