= List of European number-one hits of 2000 =

This is a list of the European Music & Media magazine's European Hot 100 Singles and European Top 100 Albums number-ones of 2000.

Issue date	Song	Artist	Album	Artist
1 January	"If I Could Turn Back the Hands of Time"	R. Kelly	All the Way...A Decade of Song	Celine Dion
8 January	"If I Could Turn Back the Hands of Time"	R. Kelly	All the Way...A Decade of Song	Celine Dion
15 January	"If I Could Turn Back the Hands of Time"	R. Kelly	All the Way...A Decade of Song	Celine Dion
22 January	"Move Your Body"	Eiffel 65	All the Way...A Decade of Song	Celine Dion
29 January	"Move Your Body"	Eiffel 65	All the Way...A Decade of Song	Celine Dion
5 February	"Move Your Body"	Eiffel 65	All the Way...A Decade of Song	Celine Dion
12 February	"Move Your Body"	Eiffel 65	Supernatural	Santana
19 February	"Move Your Body"	Eiffel 65	Supernatural	Santana
26 February	"Move Your Body"	Eiffel 65	Supernatural	Santana
4 March	"Move Your Body"	Eiffel 65	Supernatural	Santana
11 March	"Sex Bomb"	Tom Jones & Mousse T.	Supernatural	Santana
18 March	"American Pie"	Madonna	Supernatural	Santana
25 March	"American Pie"	Madonna	Supernatural	Santana
1 April	"American Pie"	Madonna	Supernatural	Santana
8 April	"American Pie"	Madonna	Supernatural	Santana
15 April	"American Pie"	Madonna	Supernatural	Santana
22 April	"American Pie"	Madonna	Supernatural	Santana
29 April	"American Pie"	Madonna	Supernatural	Santana
6 May	"Maria Maria"	Santana featuring The Product G&B	Supernatural	Santana
13 May	"Oops!...I Did It Again"	Britney Spears	Supernatural	Santana
20 May	"Oops!...I Did It Again"	Britney Spears	Supernatural	Santana
27 May	"Oops!...I Did It Again"	Britney Spears	Supernatural	Santana
3 June	"Oops!...I Did It Again"	Britney Spears	Oops!...I Did It Again	Britney Spears
10 June	"Oops!...I Did It Again"	Britney Spears	Oops!...I Did It Again	Britney Spears
17 June	"Oops!...I Did It Again"	Britney Spears	Crush	Bon Jovi
24 June	"It's My Life"	Bon Jovi	Crush	Bon Jovi
1 July	"It's My Life"	Bon Jovi	Crush	Bon Jovi
8 July	"It's My Life"	Bon Jovi	Crush	Bon Jovi
15 July	"It's My Life"	Bon Jovi	Crush	Bon Jovi
22 July	"The Real Slim Shady"	Eminem	Crush	Bon Jovi
29 July	"The Real Slim Shady"	Eminem	Crush	Bon Jovi
5 August	"The Real Slim Shady"	Eminem	In Blue	The Corrs
12 August	"Freestyler"	Bomfunk MC's	In Blue	The Corrs
19 August	"I'm Outta Love"	Anastacia	In Blue	The Corrs
26 August	"I'm Outta Love"	Anastacia	In Blue	The Corrs
2 September	"Lucky"	Britney Spears	In Blue	The Corrs
9 September	"Music"	Madonna	In Blue	The Corrs
16 September	"Music"	Madonna	In Blue	The Corrs
23 September	"Music"	Madonna	In Blue	The Corrs
30 September	"Music"	Madonna	In Blue	The Corrs
7 October	"Music"	Madonna	Music	Madonna
14 October	"Music"	Madonna	Music	Madonna
21 October	"Could I Have This Kiss Forever"	Whitney Houston & Enrique Iglesias	Music	Madonna
28 October	"Beautiful Day"	U2	Music	Madonna
4 November	"Beautiful Day"	U2	Chocolate Starfish and the Hot Dog Flavored Water	Limp Bizkit
11 November	"Lady (Hear Me Tonight)"	Modjo	Sailing to Philadelphia	Mark Knopfler
18 November	"Lady (Hear Me Tonight)"	Modjo	All That You Can't Leave Behind	U2
25 November	"Shape of My Heart"	Backstreet Boys	All That You Can't Leave Behind	U2
2 December	"One More Time"	Daft Punk	All That You Can't Leave Behind	U2
9 December	"Independent Women Part I"	Destiny's Child	1	The Beatles
16 December	"Independent Women Part I"	Destiny's Child	1	The Beatles
23 December	"Stan"	Eminem featuring Dido	1	The Beatles
30 December	"Stan"	Eminem featuring Dido	1	The Beatles

== See also ==
- 2000 in music
- List of number-one hits in Europe
