= List of number-one hits of 2000 (Italy) =

This is a list of the number-one hits and albums of 2000 on Italian Charts.

== Chart history ==
| Week | Issue date | Song | Artist | Album | Artist |
|---|---|---|---|---|---|
| 1 | 6 January | "La fine del millennio" | Vasco Rossi | Io non so parlar d'amore | Adriano Celentano |
| 2 | 13 January | "When You Say Nothing at All" | Ronan Keating | No Man's Land | Hevia |
| 3 | 20 January | "Move Your Body" | Eiffel 65 | Io non so parlar d'amore | Adriano Celentano |
| 4 | 27 January | "Where I'm Headed" | Lene Marlin | Io non so parlar d'amore | Adriano Celentano |
| 5 | 28 January | "Cartoon Heroes" | Aqua | No Man's Land | Hevia |
| 6 | 4 February | "Go Let It Out" | Oasis | Stagioni | Francesco Guccini |
| 7 | 11 February | "Go Let It Out" | Oasis | Io non so parlar d'amore | Adriano Celentano |
| 8 | 18 February | "Pure Shores" | All Saints | No Man's Land | Hevia |
| 9 | 25 February | "American Pie" | Madonna | Standing on the Shoulder of Giants | Oasis |
| 10 | 3 March | "American Pie" | Madonna | No Man's Land | Hevia |
| 11 | 10 March | "American Pie" | Madonna | Supernatural | Santana |
| 12 | 17 March | "American Pie" | Madonna | Supernatural | Santana |
| 13 | 24 March | "Tutti gli zeri del mondo" | Renato Zero | Supernatural | Santana |
| 14 | 31 March | "Tutti gli zeri del mondo" | Renato Zero | Supernatural | Santana |
| 15 | 7 April | "Io ci sarò" | Piero Pelù | Supernatural | Santana |
| 16 | 14 April | "Io ci sarò" | Piero Pelù | Supernatural | Santana |
| 17 | 21 April | "American Pie" | Madonna | Né buoni né cattivi | Piero Pelù |
| 18 | 28 April | "The Bad Touch" | Bloodhound Gang | Supernatural | Santana |
| 19 | 5 May | "Oops!... I Did It Again" | Britney Spears | Supernatural | Santana |
| 20 | 12 May | "It's My Life" | Bon Jovi | Supernatural | Santana |
| 21 | 19 May | "It's My Life" | Bon Jovi | Supernatural | Santana |
| 22 | 26 May | "It's My Life" | Bon Jovi | Supernatural | Santana |
| 23 | 2 June | "It's My Life" | Bon Jovi | Crush | Bon Jovi |
| 24 | 9 June | "Vamos a bailar (Esta vida nueva)" | Paola & Chiara | Supernatural | Santana |
| 25 | 16 June | "It's My Life" | Bon Jovi | ...Squérez? | Lùnapop |
| 26 | 23 June | "It's My Life" | Bon Jovi | ...Squérez? | Lùnapop |
| 27 | 30 June | "Vamos a bailar (Esta vida nueva)" | Paola & Chiara | ...Squérez? | Lùnapop |
| 28 | 7 July | "Vamos a bailar (Esta vida nueva)" | Paola & Chiara | ...Squérez? | Lùnapop |
| 29 | 14 July | "Vamos a bailar (Esta vida nueva)" | Paola & Chiara | ...Squérez? | Lùnapop |
| 30 | 21 July | "Freestyler" | Bomfunk MC's | ...Squérez? | Lùnapop |
| 31 | 28 July | "Freestyler" | Bomfunk MC's | ...Squérez? | Lùnapop |
| 32 | 4 August | "Freestyler" | Bomfunk MC's | ...Squérez? | Lùnapop |
| 33 | 11 August | "Freestyler" | Bomfunk MC's | ...Squérez? | Lùnapop |
| 34 | 18 August | "Music" | Madonna | ...Squérez? | Lùnapop |
| 35 | 25 August | "Music" | Madonna | ...Squérez? | Lùnapop |
| 36 | 1 September | "Music" | Madonna | ...Squérez? | Lùnapop |
| 37 | 8 September | "Music" | Madonna | ...Squérez? | Lùnapop |
| 38 | 15 September | "Music" | Madonna | Music | Madonna |
| 39 | 22 September | "Music" | Madonna | Sailing to Philadelphia | Mark Knopfler |
| 40 | 29 September | "Fuoco nel fuoco" | Eros Ramazzotti | Cento di queste vite | Pooh |
| 41 | 6 October | "Beautiful Day" | U2 | Cento di queste vite | Pooh |
| 42 | 13 October | "Beautiful Day" | U2 | Sailing to Philadelphia | Mark Knopfler |
| 43 | 20 October | "Beautiful Day" | U2 | Greatest Hits | Lenny Kravitz |
| 44 | 27 October | "She Bangs" | Ricky Martin | All That You Can't Leave Behind | U2 |
| 45 | 3 November | "Beautiful Day" | U2 | All That You Can't Leave Behind | U2 |
| 46 | 10 November | "Shape of My Heart" | Backstreet Boys | Esco di rado e parlo ancora meno | Adriano Celentano |
| 47 | 17 November | "Again" | Lenny Kravitz | 1 | The Beatles |
| 48 | 24 November | "Again" | Lenny Kravitz | 1 | The Beatles |
| 49 | 1 December | "Again" | Lenny Kravitz | 1 | The Beatles |
| 50 | 8 December | "Don't Tell Me" | Madonna | 1 | The Beatles |
| 51 | 15 December | "Goodnight Moon" | Shivaree | 1 | The Beatles |
| 52 | 22 December | "Goodnight Moon" | Shivaree | 1 | The Beatles |
| 53 | 29 December | "Goodnight Moon" | Shivaree | 1 | The Beatles |

== See also ==
- 2000 in music
- List of number-one hits in Italy
