= Too Much of Heaven =

Single by Eiffel 65

from the album Europop
- Released: 11 May 1999
- Genre: Europop; synthpop
- Length: 5:17 (album version); 3:30 (single version)
- Label: WEA; Skooby
- Songwriters: Maurizio Lobina; Gianfranco Randone; Massimo Gabutti
- Producers: Massimo Gabutti; Luciano Zucchet

Eiffel 65 singles chronology
"Blue (Da Ba Dee)" (1998)	"Too Much of Heaven" (1999)	"Move Your Body" (1999)

Music video
- "Too Much of Heaven" on YouTube

"Too Much of Heaven" is a song written by the Italian dance group Eiffel 65 and the second official single from their first album, Europop. The single was originally released in Italy on 11 May 1999. It was released in Canada, the United States, Australia, New Zealand and in several European countries in March 2000. "Too Much of Heaven" peaked at number two on the Italian singles chart, and reached the top 10 in France and top 25 in Switzerland. On the Eurochart Hot 100, the song peaked at number 20.

The song is about the downsides of being too greedy. It has been described by Pitchfork as "the very first example of rapping through Auto-Tune".

== Music video ==
Two official music videos were made for this song. Both videos showed the band performing in a white backdrop studio. The first video, however, had footage from various Eiffel 65 concerts, whereas the second video instead showed the band performing as ninjas wearing luminous make-up performing karate moves.

== Track listings ==
- Album version (5:18)
- Original radio (4:10)
- Original video (3:31)
- DJ Gabry Ponte radio (4:57)
- DJ Gabry Ponte extended mix (7:05)
- Futuristic R&B slice (5:33)

12" Italy

1. "Too Much of Heaven" (DJ Gabry Ponte extended mix) (7:02)
2. "Too Much of Heaven" (album version) (5:17)
3. "Too Much of Heaven" (futuristic R&B slice) (5:33)

CD maxi – Italy

1. "Too Much of Heaven" (original radio edit) (4:10)
2. "Too Much of Heaven" (DJ Gabry Ponte club remix) (4:54)
3. "Too Much of Heaven" (futuristic R&B slice) (5:33)

CD single – France

1. "Too Much of Heaven" (original video edit) (3:29)
2. "Too Much of Heaven" (original radio edit) (4:10)

CD single – Germany

1. "Too Much of Heaven" (radio version) (3:30)
2. "Too Much of Heaven" (album version) (5:17)

CD maxi – Greece

1. "Too Much of Heaven" (DJ Gabry Ponte radio edit) (4:54)
2. "Too Much of Heaven" (DJ Gabry Ponte extended mix) (7:02)
3. "Too Much of Heaven" (original radio edit) (4:10)
4. "Too Much of Heaven" (album mix) (5:17)
5. "Too Much of Heaven" (futuristic R&B slice) (5:33)

CD maxi – Europe

1. "Too Much of Heaven" (radio version) (3:30)
2. "Too Much of Heaven" (album version) (5:17)
3. "Hyperlink (Deep Down)" (4:57)

CD maxi promo – Portugal

1. "Too Much of Heaven" (original) (5:18)
2. "Too Much of Heaven" (original video) (3:31)
3. "Too Much of Heaven" (original radio) (4:10)
4. "Too Much of Heaven" (Gabry Ponte mix) (7:05)
5. "Too Much of Heaven" (Gabry Ponte radio) (4:57)
6. "Too Much of Heaven" (fantastic R&B slice) (5:34)

12" Canada

1. "Too Much of Heaven" (original extended) (5:17)
2. "Too Much of Heaven" (DJ Gabry Ponte extended mix) (7:02)
3. "Too Much of Heaven" (futuristic R&B slice) (5:33)
4. "One Goal" (Theme For Euro 2000)

CD maxi – Canada

1. "Too Much of Heaven" (album version) (5:17)
2. "Too Much of Heaven" (original radio edit) (4:10)
3. "Too Much of Heaven" (original video edit) (3:29)
4. "Too Much of Heaven" (Gabry Ponte club remix) (7:02)
5. "Too Much of Heaven" (DJ Gabry Ponte radio edit) (4:54)
6. "Too Much of Heaven" (futuristic R&B slice) (5:33)

12" promo – US

1. "Too Much of Heaven" (radio edit) (3:29)
2. "Too Much of Heaven" (Gabry Ponte mix) (7:02)
3. "Too Much of Heaven" (futuristic R&B slice) (5:33)
4. "Too Much of Heaven" (album version) (5:17)
5. "The Edge" (4:20)

CD maxi promo – US

1. "Too Much of Heaven" (radio edit) (3:29)
2. "Too Much of Heaven" (Gabry Ponte mix) (4:54)
3. "Too Much of Heaven" (futuristic R&B slice) (5:33)
4. "Too Much of Heaven" (album version) (5:17)

== Charts ==
Weekly chart performance for "Too Much of Heaven"
Chart (2000)	Peak position
Australia (ARIA)	50
Austria (Ö3 Austria Top 40)	30
Belgium (Ultratip Bubbling Under Wallonia)	14
Europe (European Hot 100 Singles)	31
Europe (Eurochart Hot 100)	20
France (SNEP)	6
Germany (GfK)	35
Greece (IFPI)	5
Italy (FIMI)	2
Italy Airplay (Music & Media)	2
New Zealand (Recorded Music NZ)	49
Romania (Romanian Top 100)	3
Spain (Promusicae)	11
Sweden (Sverigetopplistan)	52
Switzerland (Schweizer Hitparade)	22

Annual chart rankings for "Too Much of Heaven"
Chart (2000)	Position
Italy (Musica e Dischi)	5
