= Contact! (Eiffel 65 album) =

Studio album by Eiffel 65
- Released: 24 July 2001
- Recorded: September 2000 – January 2001
- Genre: Electronica; Italo dance; Eurodance
- Length: 73:24
- Label: WEA

Eiffel 65 chronology
Europop (1999)	Contact! (2001)	Eiffel 65 (2003)

Singles from Contact!
- 1. "One Goal" Released: 2000; 2. "Lucky (In My Life)" Released: 5 June 2001; 3. "'80s Stars" Released: 3 November 2001; 4. "Back in Time" Released: 2002; 5. "Losing You" Released: 2002

Professional ratings
Review scores
Source	Rating
Allmusic	3/5 stars
laut.de	Positive
rockol.it	5/5 stars
Random.Access	6.8/10 stars

Contact! is the second album by Italian Dance trio Eiffel 65. Released on 24 July 2001 through WEA. the album contains lyrics in both English and Italian.

== Background ==
The band entered production on Contact! in the wake of the worldwide success of “Blue (Da Ba Dee),” which had topped charts across Europe and reached No. 6 on the US Billboard Hot 100, shaping expectations for the group’s follow-up release.

== Development and sound ==
Work on the album originally began in August 2000, while Eiffel 65 were on a tour bus in Los Angeles in the United States. They had brought a laptop computer, a keyboard and a pair of speakers, and "Back In Time" would be the first track written for the album. When the group went back to Turin, they would take more time to get back in touch in producing music. The album was developed over the course of six months, with 31 demos recorded.

The album's sound is different from the group's first album. Europop (1999), taking influence from French house à la Daft Punk and also displaying a stronger Depeche Mode influence. It also incorporates synthpop elements. However, the harder and more metallic Eurodance sound of their earlier work occasionally shines through on some tracks. Member Jeffrey Jey called the change of sound from their previous album more of a "development" than a radical change in direction. New techniques of arrangement were also used, such as sampling sounds into instruments.

== Track listing ==
1. "Lucky (In My Life)" – 3:52
2. "New Life" – 4:45
3. "One Goal" – 3:37
4. "King of Lullaby" – 4:39
5. "I DJ with the Fire" – 4:36
6. "Crazy" – 5:03
7. "Far Away" – 4:02
8. "I Don't Wanna Lose" – 4:30
9. "Morning Time" – 4:42
10. "Life Like Thunder" – 3:30
11. "Back in Time" – 3:49
12. "Johnny Grey" – 3:44
13. "Brightly Shines" – 4:58
14. "Losing You" – 4:45
15. "People of Tomorrow" – 4:12
16. "Journey" – 4:48
17. "'80s Stars" – 4:26

=== Notes ===
On the international version, "'80s Stars" is replaced with "World in the World."

== Singles ==
"One Goal" (2000)
The song peaked at #37 on the French charts.
Versions:

- Radio Edit (3:37)
- French Edit (5:30)
- Alex X-Cut (5:25)
- Max Aqualuce Cut (5:15)

"Lucky (In My Life)" (2001)
"'80s Stars" (2001)
The song peaked at #9 in Italy
"Back In Time" (2002)
The song peaked #12 in Italy and #11 in Spain.
"Losing You" (2002; promo in Canada)
The song peaked at #10 in Canada

== Personnel ==
- Jeffrey Jey – arranger, vocals, artistic producer
- Maurizio Lobina – keyboards, programming
- Gabry Ponte – programming
- Franco Battiato – vocals on "80s Stars"
- Elena Flochen – vocals on "Losing You"; backing vocals on "I Don't Wanna Lose" and "World in the World"
- Mauro Di Deco – mixing
- Massimo Gabutti – executive producer
- Luciano Zucchet – executive producer
