= Lucky (In My Life) =

Single by Eiffel 65

from the album Contact!
- B-side: "Remix"
- Released: 5 June 2001
- Genre: Eurodance; Italo dance
- Length: 3:50
- Label: Sony BMG
- Songwriters: Maurizio Lobina; Gianfranco Randone; Massimo Gabutti
- Producers: Massimo Gabutti; Luciano Zucchet

Eiffel 65 singles chronology
"Back in Time" (2001)	"Lucky (In My Life)" (2001)	"80's Stars" (2001)

Music video
- "Lucky (In My Life)" on YouTube

"Lucky (In My Life)" is a song by Italian group Eiffel 65. It was first released in June 2001 as the third single from their album Contact! in mainland Europe (the song was not released in the United Kingdom). The single reached the top 40 in Austria, Canada, and Italy.

== Release history and promotion ==
Eiffel 65 first performed the song live at Festivalbar in 2001.

The Italian, Canadian and Spanish vinyl releases included 5 mixes of the song. On the German and French vinyl releases, however, it had one less mix of the song than the Italian and Spanish vinyl releases, which was the "Under Deal Trance Mix" by Alex Topuntoli. Some of the CD releases for the single include only two versions of the song, which is the radio edit and a DJ Vortronik radio cut. Some CD releases have six mixes of the song, and other CD releases include all 8 mixes.

"Lucky" is the first track of the album Contact!. Seven of the mixes of the song were featured on the 2x release of the album, and the Gabry Ponte radio mix of the song is the second track of the iTunes release of the album.

== Composition and critical response ==
The song is played in an A major key at 130 BPM. While most of the band's songs combine fantasy with subtle messages, Lucky (In My Life) is a simple, happy, sunny and summery-style song centered around the better things in life.

Allmusic's Mackenzie Wilson, in a review of Contact!, highlighted the use of a vocoder in the song. Laut.de said that "more music should come out as Euro-dance numbers in the style of the single "Lucky (In My Life)" for the foam party." Rockol.it praised how catchy the songs "Lucky (In My Life)" and "Back in time" were, saying that they "do not fail to do their duty."

== Commercial performance ==
The song debuted at peaked in #13 in Italy. However, it dropped to #15 the next week, and ended at #20 the week after. In France, the song debuted at #97, and three weeks later the song peaked at #68. It ended at #96 on its sixth week. The song charted for 11 weeks in Austria, debuting at #54, peaking at #23 on the seventh week, and ending at #52. In Switzerland, the song debuted at #74, but dropped to #100, and only managed to go up to #90 on the final week. The song was also a Top 40 hit in Canada, peaking at #25, and was also charted in Germany, peaking at #57, and in Sweden, peaking #56.

== Music video ==
The video for this song features the band and three nearly look-alikes of the band. The video describes three ordinary people watching Eiffel 65 music videos and idolizing the band when they too become their idols. However, when the ordinary people attempt to use Effiel 65's powers, it doesn't work for some reason (Ex. They try to fight the Blue Aliens like Maurizio and Gabry did in the "Blue" Music Video but the aliens kept hitting them).

== Track listing ==
CD maxi

1. "Lucky (In My Life)" (radio cut) — 3:50
2. "Lucky (In My Life)" (Gabry Ponte club mix) — 5:15
3. "Lucky (In My Life)" (ice pop extended mix) — 5:05
4. "Lucky (In My Life)" (burn down da house cut) — 5:14
5. "Lucky (In My Life)" (under deal trance mix) — 4:30
6. "Lucky (In My Life)" (DJ Vontronik) — 4:02

== Charts ==
Chart (2001)	Peak position
Austria (Ö3 Austria Top 40)	23
Canada (Nielsen SoundScan)	25
France (SNEP)	68
Germany (Media Control Charts)	57
Italy (FIMI)	13
Sweden (Sverigetopplistan)	56
Switzerland (Schweizer Hitparade)	74

=== Year-end charts ===
Chart (2001)	Position
Canada (Nielsen SoundScan)	163
