= Karmah (band) =

Karmah was an Italian R&B/hip-hop duo with Elisa Bava on lead vocals and JulyB on rap vocals. They were produced by the Italian DJ Gabry Ponte and Dom Capuano. In 2005, they experienced some success in several European countries with a cover of The SOS Band's song "Just Be Good to Me" (feat. Jay Delano), which peaked at #2 on Polish National Top 50 and sampled "Every Breath You Take" by The Police. The band released a follow-up, "Tom's Diner" (a remake of the classic hit by Suzanne Vega) and their debut album, "Be Good To Me".

== Discography ==
Singles

| Year | Title | Chart Positions | | | | |
| Year | Title | AUT | GER | SWI | HU Airplay | RU Airplay |
|---|---|---|---|---|---|---|
| 2005 | Just Be Good To Me | - | 39 | - | - | - |
| 2006 | Just Be Good To Me (Every Breath You Take) | 2 | 5 | 50 | 38 | 84 |
| 2006 | Tom's Diner | 56 | 54 | - | - | 103 |
