= Ana Bettz =

Italian singer

- Born: Anna Bettozzi; July 27, 1958 (age 68); Rome, Italy
- Genres: Pop music
- Years active: 1998–present
- Website: www.anabettz.it

Anna Bettozzi (born July 27 in Rome, Italy), known by her stage name Ana Bettz, is an Italian singer-songwriter, dancer, and former real estate agent. She became well known for releasing her singles "Ecstasy" (1998), "Who Is It Tonight?" (2000), "Black and White" (2001), "Femme" (2003), and "Freedom" (2004), which became well known in Russia, France, and the United Kingdom. All the singles were from her debut studio album, Freedom, which was released in 2003. Her next album, The One, would be released in 2011.

== Musical career ==
When Bettozzi was young, she thought work was important, and focused on more solid jobs, in which she became a real estate entrepreneur. However, having English been her second language, she aspired working in a more international business. Because singing, songwriting, and dancing was her dream, she decided to start her career all over again and would go by the stage name Ana Bettz.

Ana's first single, "Ecstasy", was written independently with her grandmother and children, and was recorded in her former headquarters of her agency, which was located in Santa Monica and Los Angeles, California, in December 1997. DJ Jay Winding had sent the song to English musician Kofi, so his version with European-like sounds could have a more American flavor. The music video for "Ecstasy" was done in the same country, and includes a shot with a producer for Madonna and Michael Jackson. The video cost 600,000,000 Lire (Euro300,000) to make. The song's U.S. release was slipped by one month. Her second single, "Who Is It Tonight?", would follow, and it would appear on the UK Dance Charts. Her third single, "Black and White", was released in 2001, and sold 500,000 copies in Britain. The video for Black and white is set in a medieval castle, and is entrusted to the Eiffel 65 remix. The next single, "Femme", released in 2003, became well known in France, and its single album included a music video for the song.

Bettz recorded her first studio album, Freedom, at UK production company the Real Word. The album was released September 2003, and was produced by Sony Music Entertainment and Nar International. Singers Peter Gabriel, David Foster and Kofi contributed to the album, with Gabriel handling the mixing and Foster and Kofi producing the track "Don't Say It's Love". Bettz performed the album at an art café in Italy in March 2004, with actresses Martina Stella, Violante Placido, and Isabella Orsini attending.

In January 2011, Ana performed her single, "Move On", on the Italian television show Quelli che... il Calcio. This was a single from her second album, The One, which was released in May 2011. She also performed the single on the February 19, 2011 episode of Top of the Pops. Another single from the album was "You Are The One", which was performed on the television channel Sky TG24 in 2009. Four of her songs from the album were performed by her at the Spazio Novecento in Rome, Italy in 2009.

== Personal life ==
Anna Bettozzi was born in Rome; her family originated from Boston (MA), USA. She became friends with politician Silvio Berlusconi, due to the relationship of his mother, Rosa. Her grandmother was American, which was why English became her second language. She has a sister, Maria, and a brother, Cesare. She has a degree in sociology, and is married to Sergio Di Cesare, president of the heating manufacturing company Europetroli. She has two daughters, one born c. 1994 and another born c. 1992, and 2 other older children from her previous marriage. She currently lives in Rome.

== Robbery ==
Between 3:00 and 9:00 am on January 3, 1999, three young men armed with pistols entered into Bettz's home. Bettz was asleep with her two daughters and a maid. Though no physical violence occurred, a total of Lire 100.000.000 (€50.000 ) worth of valuables were stolen. Part of these valuables included three collectible watches worth Lire 40.000.000 (€20.000 ). Information about the incident was withheld by police until the afternoon of January 4.

== Legal problems ==
On April 8, 2021, Ana Bettz was arrested in Italy accused of doing business with the Moccia clan of the Camorra and the Mancuso 'ndrina of the 'Ndrangheta.

She was arrested, along with 71 other suspects, following a joint operation by four Italian prosecutors coordinated by the national anti-mafia prosecutor. Accused of criminal association for tax evasion. The family business of Bettozzi, "Max Petroli" - now "Made Petrol Italia Srl" - would not have paid VAT, excise duties and other taxes for over 185 million euros. The work of the prosecutors has highlighted that Max Petroli would have recovered from a serious economic crisis thanks to liquidity injections by some Camorra clans, including those of the Moccia and Casalesi.

== Activism ==
On December 21, 2011, an event conceived by Ana Bettz with the Centers for Prevention and Listening Discomfort was held at the Residence Ripetta in Rome, Italy.

== Discography ==
=== Studio albums ===
Title
Album details
Track listing
Freedom
- Released: September 2003 (Italy)
- Label: Sony Music Entertainment, Nar International
- Format: CD

No.	Title	Writer(s)	Length
1.	"Love" (prod. by Ana Bettz and R. de Luca)	A. Bettz	1:01
2.	"Femme" (prod. by C. Piccinelli)	G. Giomarelli, D. Mohammed,	3:53
3.	"Freedom" (prod. by A. Bettz and R. de Luca)	A. Bettz, D. Mohammed	3:31
4.	"Think About Me" (feat. Dionne Warwick; prod. by M. Petriaggi)	A. Bettz, M. Petriaggi, D. Mohammed	4:10
5.	"Black and White" (prod. by M. Petriaggi)	A. Bettz, M. Miller, M. Petriaggi, F. Raponi, A. Barocchi	3:47
6.	"Where Is My Baby" (prod. by M. Petriaggi)	A. Bettz, Kofi	3:51
7.	"Don't Say It's Love" (prod. by David Foster and Kofi)	L. Thompson, M. Hearmond	4:50
8.	"Sorry Seems To Be The Hardest Words" (prod. by M. Petriaggi)	Elton John	4:12
9.	"Who is Tonight" (prod. by M. Petriaggi)	A. Bettz, M. Petriaggi, A. Barocchi	2:58
10.	"All The Ways" (prod. by M. Petriaggi)	A. Bettz, M. Petriaggi, A. Barocchi, M. Miller	4:32
11.	"Ecstasy" (prod. by Jay Winding)	A. Bettz, G. Giomarelli, Q. Johnson, M. Colucci	4:27

Notes

- Most info from Tracklist is from the CD.
The One
- Released: May 2011 (Italy)
- Format: CD
None

=== Singles ===
Title	Details	Track listing	Personnel	UK Dance Charts	France	Sales
Ecstasy	Released May 15, 1998; Label: Dig It International; Format: CD	No. / Title / Length; 1. / "Ecstasy" / 4:30; 2. / "Ecstasy (Club version)" / 6:20; 3. / "Ecstasy (House version)"; Tracklist from CD.		N/A	N/A	
Who Is It Tonight?	Released August 7, 2000(Italy); Label: J&V Records; Format: CD, Vinyl	No. / Title / Length; 1. / "Who Is It Tonight? (Original Radio Edit)" / 5:58; 2. / "Who Is It Tonight? (North On 41 Radio Edit)" / 3:03; 3. / "Who Is It Tonight? (D-Bop Habit Mix)" (Remixed and Produced by Andy Allder and Dave Cross) / 6:46; 4. / "Who Is It Tonight? (Scratch 'N' Sniff Remix)" / 6:55; Tracklist adopted by discogs.com.	Instrument and Production credits: Bassist – V. Bacci; Guitarist, Drum Programmer, Sequencer, Orchestrater, Arranger – Marco Petriaggi; Keyboards, Acoustic Piano – Fabio Raponi; Percussion, Mixer – Alessandro Barocchi; Backing Vocals – Ana Bettz, C. White, D. Mohammed, K. Jones, P. Blandford; Orchestral instruments performed by the Royal Philharmonic Orchestra; Other Production credits: Mastering – F. Galeone; Record producer – AT2; Recording – J. Ruggeri; Mixer – P. Wright; Production locations: Recording – Alta Tensione Studios in Rome, Italy, CPS Studios in London, England; Mixing – Sarm Studios in London; Mastering – Alta Tensione Studios; Credits adopted by discogs.com.	Charted	N/A	
Black and White	Released 2001 (Italy); Eiffel 65 remixes were released separately on June 7, 2002.; Label: NAR International; Format: CD, Vinyl, Eiffel 65 remixes also available for digital download	No. / Title / Length; 1. / "Black & White (Eiffel 65 Radio Edit)" (Arranged by MTJ Capuano; Produced by Luciano Zucchet and Massimo Gabutti; Recorded and Mixed by Angelica Villella) / 3:52; 2. / "Black & White (Eiffel 65 Extended Mix)" (Similar credits as Track 1) / 5:38; 3. / "Black and White" / 3:46; 4. / "Who Is It Tonight?" (See personnel for Who is it tonight) / 2:58; Tracklist adopted by discogs.com.	Arranger – A. Barocchi, F. Raponi, M. Petriaggi; Mixing and Engineering – A. Barocchi; Studio Assistant – Aldo Scorza; Cover art photography – Marco Rossi; Recording – A. Barocchi; Writers – A. Barocchi, A. Bettz, F. Raponi, M. Petriaggi, Marilyn Miller; Credits adopted by discogs.com.	N/A	N/A	
Femme	Released 2003 (Italy); Label: NAR International; Format: CD, Vinyl	No. / Title / Length; 1. / "Femme (Album Version)" / 3:56; 2. / "Femme (CP Fashion Dub Short Mix)" / 3:51; 3. / "Femme (CP Fashion Dub Mix)" / 6:30; 4. / "Femme (Mavors Radio Edit Mix)" / 3:58; 5. / "Femme (Mavors Extended Mix)" / 7:16; 6. / "Femme" (Music Video); Tracklist from CD.	Arranger, Mixer, Engineer – Cristian Piccinelli; Executive Producer – Giancarlo Giomarelli; Mastering – F. De Carolis*; Writers – D. Mohammed*, Giomarelli*; Credits from CD.	N/A	N/A	
Sorry Seems To Be The Hardest Word	Format: CD		Written by Elton John	N/A	N/A	
Freedom	Released 2004			N/A	5	
Love Tonite (Going Down Like Mmmm...)	Released 2006 (UK); Label: J&V Records; Format: CD, Digital download	No. / Title / Length; 1. / "Love Tonite (Going Down Like Mmmm...)" (feat. Juelz Santana) / 3:09; 2. / "Love Tonite (Bimbo Jones Radio Edit)" / 3:19; 3. / "Love Tonite (Bimbo Jones Remix)" / 7:04; 4. / "Love Tonite (Bimbo Jones Dub Mix)" / 7:01; 5. / "Love Tonite (Radioclit Remix)" / 4:20; 6. / "Love Tonite (Hustlers Remix)" / 2:56; Tracklist adopted by Discogs.com.		N/A	N/A	
Move On				N/A	N/A	
"N/A" denotes a recording that did not chart or was not released in that territory.

=== Music videos ===
- Ecstasy
- Black and White
- Femme
- Freedom
- You Are The One
