= Papa Winnie =

- Born: Carlisle Winston Peters; March 7, 1955 (age 71); Bequia
- Origin: Saint Vincent and the Grenadines
- Labels: Epic Records, MCA Records

Papa Winnie (birth name Carlisle Winston Peters) is a reggae musician from St. Vincent and the Grenadines in the Caribbean. As of 1997 he had sold over 200,000 albums in Latin America and Asia. He is famous in Italy following a 1989 performance of the song "You Are My Sunshine".

His recordings often make mention of Rootsie and Boopsie, first named in his song of the same title from 1987. In an interview on Italian TV, he said that "Rootsie" and "Boopsie" were nicknames for the two children he just had from his recently married Italian girlfriend, but he gave no further information about the children's real names.

In 1993, Papa Winnie visited Brazil but he had no band to play shows with him. He immediately picked four people: Nelson Meirelles, Marcelo Lobato, Alexandre Menezes and Marcelo Yuka as the band. After Papa Winnie's shows, the four decided to stay together picking Falcão as the fifth member and vocalist. (O Rappa)

In 1995, Papa Winnie recorded the Ray Charles classic "I Can't Stop Loving You" rated as one of the better visual videos of the year.

== Discography ==
=== Albums ===
- 1989 – One Blood One Love (Epic)
- 1989 – Rootsie & Boopsie (Epic)
- 1993 – You Are My Sunshine (MCA)
- 1996 – All of My Heart (MCA)

=== Singles ===
- 1988 – April the Sweetest Girls
- 1989 – Rootsie & Boopsie
- 1990 – A
- 1990 – Brothers and Sisters
- 1990 – Get Up
- 1993 – Please Stay
- 1993 – Someday, New Day
- 1994 – I Can't Stop Loving You
- 1996 – All of My Heart
- 2003 – Money Problems
