= Blue (Da Ba Dee) =

1998 single by Eiffel 65

Single by Eiffel 65

from the album Europop
- Released: October 1998
- Genre: Eurodance; dance-pop
- Length: 4:43 (album version); 3:39 (video edit); 3:29 (US radio edit)
- Label: Skooby
- Songwriters: Gianfranco Randone; Maurizio Lobina; Massimo Gabutti
- Producers: Maurizio Lobina; Gabry Ponte

Eiffel 65 singles chronology
"Blue (Da Ba Dee)" (1998)	"Too Much of Heaven" (1999)

Music video
- "Blue (Da Ba Dee)" on YouTube

"Blue (Da Ba Dee)" is a song by the Italian music group Eiffel 65. It was first released in October 1998 in Italy by Skooby Records and became internationally successful the following year. It is the lead single from the group's 1999 debut album, Europop.

"Blue (Da Ba Dee)" was developed before the formation of the group by its future members Jeffrey Jey (Gianfranco Randone), Maurizio Lobina and Gabry Ponte and producer Massimo Gabutti, while working at Bliss Corporation in Turin. It was inspired by a piano hook composed by Lobina, and written by Randone, Lobina and Gabutti, with Ponte working on the beats and final arrangement. When released in 1998, it achieved little success, but became very popular globally the following year once it was broadcast on the radio.

The song is the group's most popular single and among the biggest-selling songs of 1999, reaching number one in at least 18 countries, charting at number three in Italy, and peaking at number six on the US Billboard Hot 100 in January 2000. In the United Kingdom, the song initially entered the top 40 of the UK Singles Chart purely on import sales; it was only the third single to do this. The song also received a Grammy Award nomination for Best Dance Recording at the 2001 Grammy Awards. "Blue (Da Ba Dee)" has also been heavily sampled and remixed in later years.

== Writing and production ==
Written by Eiffel 65 lead singer Jeffrey Jey, keyboardist Maurizio Lobina, and producer Massimo Gabutti, "Blue (Da Ba Dee)" was inspired by an opening piano hook composed by Lobina. The producers of the song then came up with the idea for a dance song. Jey explained that his inspiration for the lyrics was how a person chooses their lifestyle. The colour blue as the main theme of the song was picked at random, with Lobina telling him to write nonsensical lyrics. Gabutti came up with the "da ba dee" hook. The pitch-shifted vocal effect used in the song was created with a harmonizer.

== Lyrics and composition ==
Eiffel 65 – "Blue (Da Ba Dee)", 1999
A 30-second sample of Jeffrey Jey's vocals on "Blue (Da Ba Dee)." The song was one of the first ever popular tracks to use pitch correction.

"Blue (Da Ba Dee)" is written in the key of G minor, with the vocal range spanning from C_{3} to E♭_{4}, and is set in common time with a moderate tempo of 128 beats per minute.

The song's lyrics tell a story about a man who lives in a "blue world". It says that he is "blue inside and outside", which, alongside the lyric "himself and everybody around 'cause he ain't got nobody to listen", and "blue are the feelings that live inside me" may indicate that the term blue represents his emotional state; however, the song also explains that a vast variety of what he owns is also blue, including his house and his car ("a blue Corvette"). Various blue-coloured objects are also depicted on the single's cover.

Lead vocalist Gianfranco Randone (Jeffrey Jey) later clarified that the song was not strictly intended to be about sadness, but was instead written as a metaphor for the individual lenses through which people perceive reality. According to Randone, the concept emerged from thinking about how people choose their lifestyles, homes, and partners, effectively filtering their entire internal and external worlds through a singular, personal perspective. Keyboardist Maurizio Lobina composed the opening piano hook, after which Randone drafted three lyric options, with the band deliberately choosing the most eccentric version. The nonsensical "Da Ba Dee" refrain was suggested by producer Massimo Gabutti to serve as a universal, phonetically simple hook that international audiences could easily sing along to regardless of language barriers.

== Critical reception ==
The song received mixed reviews from critics. Chuck Taylor from Billboard wrote that "the hook here, with its dancy but curiously compelling singsong rhythm and lyric, is destined to react instantly with listeners far and wide." He also noted that it has a "euro sound", and "it's creative, it will affect listeners on both ends of the demographic spectrum, and it's anthemic." A reviewer from Entertainment Weekly positively reviewed the song, calling the song "a fleeting, feel-good foot-tapper" and gave the song a rating of B−. Scottish newspaper Daily Record said it is the "strangest-sounding Euro-club hit of the summer". The Daily Vault's Christopher Thelen described it as a "quirky little hit" with a "bouncy chorus". He also noted that "the key is the use of the voice synthesizer". PopMatters reviewer Chris Massey, in his review of Europop, described his initial reaction to the song as being "really, really bad." However, he later stated in the review that after many repeated listenings of the song he "loved it." AllMusic editor Jose F. Promis described the song as a "hypnotic smash" in his review of Europop.

Rolling Stone, however, in their review of Europop, gave the song a negative review, commenting that the song "blends Cher-esque vocoder vocals, trance-like synth riffs, unabashed Eurodisco beats and a baby-babble chorus so infantile it makes the Teletubbies sound like Shakespeare." The magazine also placed the song on their list of the "20 Most Annoying Songs," at No. 14.

== Chart performance ==
The single, released in October 1998, was a chart-topper in many European countries. The song initially found success in France, where it debuted in August 1999 and reached number one for three weeks. It then found success in other European countries, reaching the top spot on many charts in September the same year, including Germany, the Netherlands, Switzerland, Sweden, and others. The song re-charted on 6 May 2013 at No. 40 on the UK Singles Chart, following its inclusion in Iron Man 3. The song also topped record charts of Australia, New Zealand and Canada.

== Music video ==
The accompanying music video for the song was released in 1999 by BlissCoMedia, a computer graphics division of Bliss Corporation, known at the time the video was produced and released as BlissMultiMedia.

Like much of the Bliss Corporation's music videos, this one was done in a green screen garage studio at BlissCoMedia, and it featured computer-generated graphics that were done in 3ds Max. With very few resources, tutorials and books, and only one editing machine, the video was made between 1998 and 1999 in a garage in about two to three months.

Former BlissCo employee Davide La Sala has talked about coming up with the story for the video: "We had brainstorming sessions and we were a very imaginative team, huge fans of sci-fi movies and video games: Blade Runner, Star Wars, etc… we were master in doing our best and working with the few tools we had to create complete short stories in a very short period of time."

Similar to other music videos by BlissCo, a total of five people worked on this video. The green-screen footage was done in a short amount of time, and some of it was put into a computer-generated 3D environment, while components of the band were also shot. La Sala said, "We were very flexible but every person in the team had his own special skill who was more towards motion graphics, design and editing, others more skilled in architectural design and me and the CEO experts in animation."

The video was listed in NME's "50 Worst Music Videos Ever".

=== Synopsis ===
The video takes place on Tukon4, where lead singer Jeffrey Jey is abducted by blue-coloured aliens Zorotl and Sayok6 during a concert.

== Formats and track listings ==
- CD single (Italy)
1. "Blue (Da Ba Dee)" (DJ Ponte Ice Pop Mix) – 6:25
2. "Blue (Da Ba Dee)" (DJ Ponte Radio Edit) – 4:43
3. "Blue (Da Ba Dee)" (Glamour Jump Cut) – 5:19
4. "Blue (Da Ba Dee)" (Dub Mix) – 4:47
- CD single 1 (UK)
1. "Blue (Da Ba Dee)" (Original Ice Pop Radio Edit) – 4:46
2. "Blue (Da Ba Dee)" (Hannover Remix Radio Edit) – 4:04
3. "Blue (Da Ba Dee)" (Glamour Jump Cut) – 5:19
4. "Blue (Da Ba Dee)" (Dub) – 4:48
- CD single 2 (UK)
1. "Blue (Da Ba Dee)" (Original Ice Pop 12" Mix) – 6:30
2. "Blue (Da Ba Dee)" (Hannover 12" Remix) – 6:25
3. "Blue (Da Ba Dee)" (Paris Remix) – 7:03
4. "Blue (Da Ba Dee)" (Video) – 3:40
- Digital single
1. "Blue (Da Ba Dee)" (Gabry Ponte Ice Pop Mix) – 6:27
2. "Blue (Da Ba Dee)" (Gabry Ponte Ice Pop Radio) – 4:44
3. "Blue (Da Ba Dee)" (Gabry Ponte Video Edit) – 3:40
4. "Blue (Da Ba Dee)" (Dub Mix) – 4:47
5. "Blue (Da Ba Dee)" (Molinaro Parade Mix) – 8:50
6. "Blue (Da Ba Dee)" (Glamour Jump Cut) – 5:17
7. "Blue (Da Ba Dee)" (Max 04 Ext Remix) – 6:35
8. "Blue (Da Ba Dee)" (Hannover Remix) – 6:23
9. "Blue (Da Ba Dee)" (Paris Remix) – 7:43

== Charts ==
=== Weekly charts ===
Weekly chart performance for "Blue (Da Ba Dee)"
Chart (1999–2000)	Peak position
Australia (ARIA)	1
Austria (Ö3 Austria Top 40)	1
Belgium (Stichting Promuvi)	1
Belgium (Ultratop 50 Flanders)	1
Belgium (Ultratop 50 Wallonia)	2
Canada (Nielsen SoundScan)	1
Canada Top Singles (RPM)	1
Canada Adult Contemporary (RPM)	38
Canada Dance/Urban (RPM)	1
Canada CHR (Nielsen BDS)	1
Croatia International Airplay (HRT)	3
Denmark (IFPI)	1
Europe (Eurochart Hot 100)	1
European Radio Top 50 (Music & Media)	3
European Border Breakers (Music & Media)	1
Finland (Suomen virallinen lista)	1
France (SNEP)	1
France Airplay (SNEP)	4
Germany (GfK)	1
Greece (IFPI)	1
Hungary (Mahasz)	1
Hungary Airplay (HCRA)	1
Iceland (Íslenski Listinn Topp 40)	4
Ireland (IRMA)	1
Italy (FIMI)	3
Italy Airplay (Music & Media)	4
Lithuania Airplay (M-1)	1
Netherlands (Dutch Top 40)	1
Netherlands (Single Top 100)	1
Netherlands Airplay (Music & Media)	11
New Zealand (Recorded Music NZ)	1
Norway (VG-lista)	1
Scottish Singles Sales (Official Charts)	1
Spain (Promusicae)	2
Sweden (Sverigetopplistan)	1
Switzerland (Schweizer Hitparade)	1
UK Singles (Official Charts)	1
US Billboard Hot 100	6
US Adult Pop Airplay (Billboard)	25
US Dance Club Songs (Billboard)	6
US Hot Latin Songs (Billboard)	16
US Pop Airplay (Billboard)	2
US Rhythmic Airplay (Billboard)	4

=== Year-end charts ===
1999 year-end chart performance for "Blue (Da Ba Dee)"
Chart (1999)	Position
Australia (ARIA)	3
Austria (Ö3 Austria Top 40)	4
Belgium (Ultratop 50 Flanders)	4
Belgium (Ultratop 50 Wallonia)	6
Canada Top Singles (RPM)	57
Canada Dance/Urban (RPM)	25
Europe (Eurochart Hot 100)	1
Europe Airplay (Music & Media)	22
Europe Border Breakers (Music & Media)	4
France (SNEP)	4
Germany (Media Control)	2
Italy (Musica e dischi)	6
Netherlands (Dutch Top 40)	7
Netherlands (Single Top 100)	5
New Zealand (RIANZ)	6
Romania (Romanian Top 100)	6
Spain (AFYVE)	6
Sweden (Hitlistan)	3
Switzerland (Schweizer Hitparade)	2
UK Singles (OCC)	2

2000 year-end chart performance for "Blue (Da Ba Dee)"
Chart (2000)	Position
Australia (ARIA)	59
Switzerland (Schweizer Hitparade)	80
US Billboard Hot 100	49
US Adult Top 40 (Billboard)	71
US Mainstream Top 40 (Billboard)	22
US Rhythmic Top 40 (Billboard)	34

=== Decade-end charts ===
Decade-end chart performance for "Blue (Da Ba Dee)"
Chart (1990–1999)	Position
Austria (Ö3 Austria Top 40)	48
Canada (Nielsen SoundScan)	26
Netherlands (Dutch Top 40)	74

=== All-time charts ===
All-time chart performance for "Blue (Da Ba Dee)"
Chart	Position
Ireland (IRMA)	6

== Certifications ==
Certifications and sales for "Blue (Da Ba Dee)"
Region	Certification	Certified units/sales
Australia (ARIA)	3× Platinum	210,000^{^}
Austria (IFPI Austria)	Platinum	50,000^{*}
Belgium (BRMA)	2× Platinum	100,000^{*}
Canada (Music Canada)	Gold	50,000^{^}
Denmark (IFPI Danmark)	Platinum	90,000^{‡}
Finland (Musiikkituottajat)	Gold	7,957
France (SNEP)	Diamond	750,000^{*}
Germany (BVMI)	5× Gold	1,250,000^{^}
Italy (FIMI) sales since 2009	2× Platinum	200,000^{‡}
Netherlands (NVPI)	Gold	50,000^{^}
New Zealand (RMNZ)	2× Platinum	60,000^{‡}
Spain (Promusicae)	Gold	30,000^{‡}
Sweden (GLF)	3× Platinum	90,000^{^}
Switzerland (IFPI Switzerland)	2× Platinum	100,000^{^}
United Kingdom (BPI)	3× Platinum	1,800,000^{‡}
Summaries
Worldwide	—	6,000,000
^{*} Sales figures based on certification alone.^{^} Shipments figures based on certification alone.^{‡} Sales+streaming figures based on certification alone.

== Release history ==
Release dates for "Blue (Da Ba Dee)"
Region	Date	Format(s)	Label(s)	Ref(s).
Italy	October 1998	12-inch vinyl; CD	Skooby	
Spain	30 April 1999	12-inch vinyl	Blanco y Negro	
France	3 June 1999	12-inch vinyl; CD	Hot Tracks	
Europe	28 June 1999	CD	Logic	
Spain	27 July 1999	12-inch remix vinyl	Blanco y Negro	
Sweden	2 August 1999	CD	Logic	
United Kingdom	13 September 1999	12-inch vinyl; CD; cassette	Eternal	
Canada	28 September 1999	CD	Popular	
United States	30 November 1999	Contemporary hit; rhythmic contemporary; alternative radio	Republic; Universal	
Japan	8 March 2000	CD	Polydor	

== Notable cover versions and parodies ==
- In 2007, virtual musician Gummibär released a cover of "Blue (Da Ba Dee)" on his debut album "I Am Your Gummy Bear".
- Wynter Gordon sang the chorus of "Blue (Da Ba Dee)" in Flo Rida's 2009 single "Sugar" from his album R.O.O.T.S.
- Dance music act Michael Mind Project interpolated of "Blue (Da Ba Dee)" in their 2012 single "Feeling So Blue". The single featuring Dante Thomas charted in Germany, Austria, Switzerland and France.
- In 2015, Colombian EDM duo F4ST released a remix of Blue featuring original vocals from Sara Tunes. In 2018, the group collaborated with Dzeko to release an updated version of the song.
- In 2017, a remix of the song by David Guetta featuring vocals from Bebe Rexha, with completely different lyrics, was played at Ultra Music Festival 2017 but was not released. In 2022, the track became popular on TikTok. This resurgence in popularity led Guetta and Rexha to finish the song, and it was released in August 2022 with the title "I'm Good (Blue)".
- In 2019, Ceky Viciny released a cover called "Ellos".
- In 2019, Canadian-Moroccan singer Faouzia released a remake called "I'm Blue". This version was featured in Episode 6 ("Results Day") of the Netflix series Red Rose.
- In 2019, Swedish singer Nea interpolated the song in "Some Say".
- In 2020, Italian rapper Shiva sampled the song in his single "Auto blu".
- In December 2020, symphonic death metal band Fleshgod Apocalypse released a cover of "Blue (Da Ba Dee)" in their own style.
- In celebration of the 25th anniversary of the Blue's Clues franchise, a small parody video about this song was produced and performed by show hosts Steve Burns, Donovan Patton, and Josh Dela Cruz.
- In July 2022, Softest Hard and T-Pain released a remix of the song.
- In 2023, Lil Uzi Vert interpolated the song in "Endless Fashion" featuring Nicki Minaj from their album Pink Tape.
- In 2025, American electronicore band the Browning released a cover of the song with an accompanying music video.
