= Bloom 06 =

Italian music group

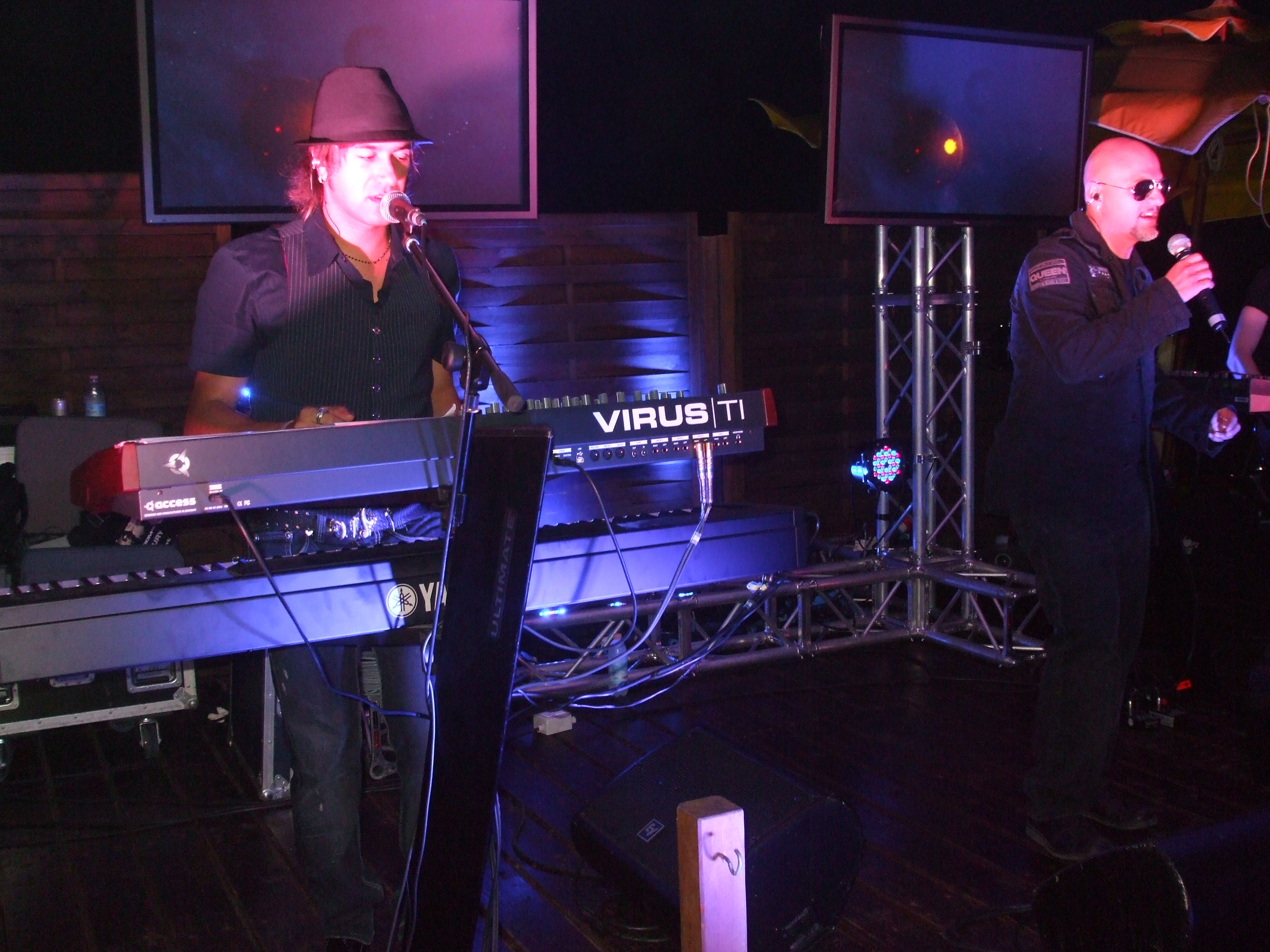
- Bloom 06 during a showcase in Ostia, Rome

Background information
- Origin: Turin, Italy
- Genres: Eurodance; Italo dance
- Years active: 2005–2010
- Labels: Blue Boys; Universal
- Spinoff of: Eiffel 65
- Past members: Jeffrey Jey; Maurizio Lobina

Bloom 06 was an Italian electronic music group, composed of two of the original three members of Eiffel 65. They have released two albums, Crash Test 01, Crash Test 02, and two remix EPs, Club Test 01 and Club Test 02. They have also released five singles.

The original group, Eiffel 65, reformed as of June 2010.

== Formation ==
Shortly after the departure of Gabry Ponte from Eiffel 65, due to a desire to begin a project of his own, Maurizio (Maury) Lobina (born on 1973 in Asti, Italy) and Gianfranco (Jeffrey) Randone officially announced, on 15 June 2005, that they had permanently put the name Eiffel 65 behind them and they were ready to begin a new chapter in their artistic careers, releasing their current work under a new name which they had chosen as Bloom 06. The duo also confirmed that their debut album Crash Test 01 would be released on their brand new label Blue Boys, which would subsequently be distributed by Universal Italy in Fall of 2006. Through a press release published on a new web domain, Bloom 06 explained:

We are extremely proud of the path we’ve followed so far and we jealously preserve and cherish the memories, the goals achieved and the lessons we’ve learned but we needed a change, a rebirth, to explore new lands, to find news inputs and a different sound, some fresh air… In order to satisfy these needs we’ve chosen to wipe the blackboard clean and start from[sic] the basics (where you work, the way you play and use new instruments and even changing the people you work with and compare to). Things and people can change and stories (even the best ones unfortunately) have an ending… we must learn to accept this: it’s a normal part of everyone’s life. What still remains the same are the intentions and motivations.

== Members ==
- Jeffrey Jey (Gianfranco Randone) – lead vocals, bass.
- Maury Lobina (Maurizio Lobina) – keyboards, guitar, backing vocals.

== Albums ==
Their first album, titled Crash Test 01, was released in October 2006. It contained 8 tracks, 5 in English and 3 in Italian. The tracks were composed over the course of 2½–3 years, though during the time that Jeffrey and Maury were still working under Eiffel 65. This album was originally intended to be Eiffel's fourth album, but it was thought to be too dark for the band which until then had been characterized as playing upbeat and happy dance music. This partly contributed to Jeffrey and Maury's departure from Bliss Corporation.

The band's second album is considered to be a 'second chapter' or 'second part' of Crash Test 01 and as such is entitled Crash Test 02. The album is said to contain lighter and more upbeat songs than the first. Crash Test 02 was originally scheduled have a much earlier release, but faced several delays, and was finally released on 23 May 2008. Prior to the album's release, Bloom 06 released multiple previews of various songs from their album on their MySpace page. The first song was Between The Lines, on 12 February 2008. After strong response from their fans, 3 other previews were added, Anche Solo Per Un Attimo, Un'altra Come Te, and Welcome To The Zoo.

After an open vote from their fans, Bloom 06 reported on their MySpace that the first single released from Crash Test 02 will be "Un'altra Come Te". The single was released on iTunes on 2 May 2008, followed by the release of Crash Test 02 on 23 May.

The album was released on Italian iTunes and in Italian stores. On 9 October, they announced that an EP of their recent songs from Crash Test 02 is going to be released by 28 November 2008. The EP also includes a remake of the hit song "Blue (Da Ba Dee)" from when they were Eiffel 65. A preview of the song was later posted on the Bloom 06 myspace website. On 16 October, another preview was posted on their myspace. This preview is also another track from the new EP, Club Test 01, and is called "Being Not Like You" but a remixed track from the original song, and is the English version of the song "Un'altra Come Te".

On 22 December, a new remix of "Welcome to the Zoo" was posted on the Bloom 06 Myspace site. It was said to be a full version of the song and was posted on the site before the song was released anywhere. On 13 January, Bloom 06 posted a new remixed song called "Pop Porno" by Il Genio. Along with the news of their new remixed track, they've also posted new pictures from when they were on their new year exhibition in Pordenone.

On 10 February, Bloom 06 posted a new featured song called "We Is The Power" by Alexia. As Jeffery said that they go way back with Alexia, they have also announced the process of making their third studio album that has yet to be officially previewed on the official Bloom 06 Myspace and official website. Another EP, Club Test 02 was released on 22 June on the Italian iTunes, United States iTunes and the Irish iTunes, and on 3 July on CD. The EP contains two new songs, Beats and Sweat in extended and radio forms, Dancing on the Moon in a radio form, a remake of Eiffel 65's 2000 hit song Move Your Body, and another remix of Welcome to the Zoo.

On 17 June 2010, Bloom 06 announced the reformation of Eiffel 65, to record a new album.

== Discography ==
=== Albums ===
- Crash Test 01 (2006)
- Crash Test 02 (2008)

=== Singles ===
- "In the City" (2006)
- "Per Sempre" (2007)
- "The Crash" (promo) (2007)
- "Un'altra Come Te" (2008)
- "Being Not Like You" (2009)
- "Beats & Sweat" (2009)

=== EPs ===
- Club Test 01 (2008)
- Club Test 02 (2009)

=== Remixes ===
- Vasco Rossi - "Basta Poco" (2007)
- Zucchero - "Un Kilo" (2007)
- Il Genio - "Pop Porno" (2009)
- Pandora - "Kitchy Kitchy" (2009)

=== Collaborations ===
- Alexia - "We Is the Power" (2009)
