= Bliss Team =

Italian Eurodance group

- Origin: Turin, Piedmont, Italy
- Genre: Eurodance
- Years active: 1992–1997
- Label: BlissCo
- Spinoffs: Eiffel 65; Roberto Molinaro; Bloom 06
- Past members: Jeffrey Jey; Roberto Molinaro; Domenico Capuano

Bliss Team was an Italian Eurodance group, active between 1992 and 1997. They had hits with songs such as "Love Is Forever", "People Have the Power" and "You Make Me Cry".

== Members ==
- Jeffrey Jey – lead vocalist
- Roberto Molinaro – DJ
- Domenico Capuano – keyboardist

== History ==
In the summer of 1991, Jeffrey Jey, who was studying at university, was invited to sing at an Italian nightclub, which became his summer job for that year. However, before the end of the year, the nightclub was shut down. While on holiday in Turin a year later, Jey played the owner of a local music shop an audio cassette of himself singing at the nightclub before its closure. The shop owner introduced him to Massimo Gabutti, the producer of the newly founded Bliss Corporation. Gabutti was impressed with Jey's demo cassette and immediately offered him a position at the Bliss Corporation with DJ Roberto Molinaro.

In January 1993, Jey moved into a friend's house and began working at Bliss Corporation alongside Gabutti, Molinaro, sound engineer Angelica Villella, and 18-year-old Maurizio Lobina. Two months later, Gabutti told him about a demo that they had been working on and asked him to do the vocals for it, which Jey agreed to. The track was a cover of Patti Smith's 1988 song "People Have the Power". Gabutti went to Milan to mix Jey's voice with the demo, and when he came back, he told Jey that it would be a part of the final mix. Their rendition of "People Have the Power" was a big hit in Italy in the summer of 1993, peaking at number 7 on the charts.

The following year, Domenico Capuano, Jeffrey Jey and Roberto Molinaro formed a group called Bliss Team. They made several hits, including "U Take Me Up", "Hold on to Love", "Love Is Forever" and "You Make Me Cry".

By the end of 1997, Bliss Corporation wanted the band to split so they could start other projects. Following the split, Molinaro became a successful DJ, Capuano became a successful composer and producer, and Jeffrey Jey formed the Eurodance group Eiffel 65.

== Discography ==
=== Albums ===
- You Make Me Cry (1996)
- Best of Bliss Team (1999)
- With or Without You (1997)

=== Singles ===
- "Livin' on a Prayer" (1993) (Bon Jovi cover)
- "People Have the Power" (1993) (Patti Smith cover)
- "Go" (1994)
- "Yellow" (1994)
- "Hold on to Love" (1995)
- "You Make Me Cry" (1995)
- "Love Is Forever" (1995)
- "Livin' on a Prayer" (re-recording) (1995)
- "U Take Me Up" (1996)
- "How Can We Survive?" (1997)
- "With or Without You" (1997) (U2 cover)
- "The Bliss" (1997)
