= Maurizio Lobina =

Italian musician and singer (born 1973)

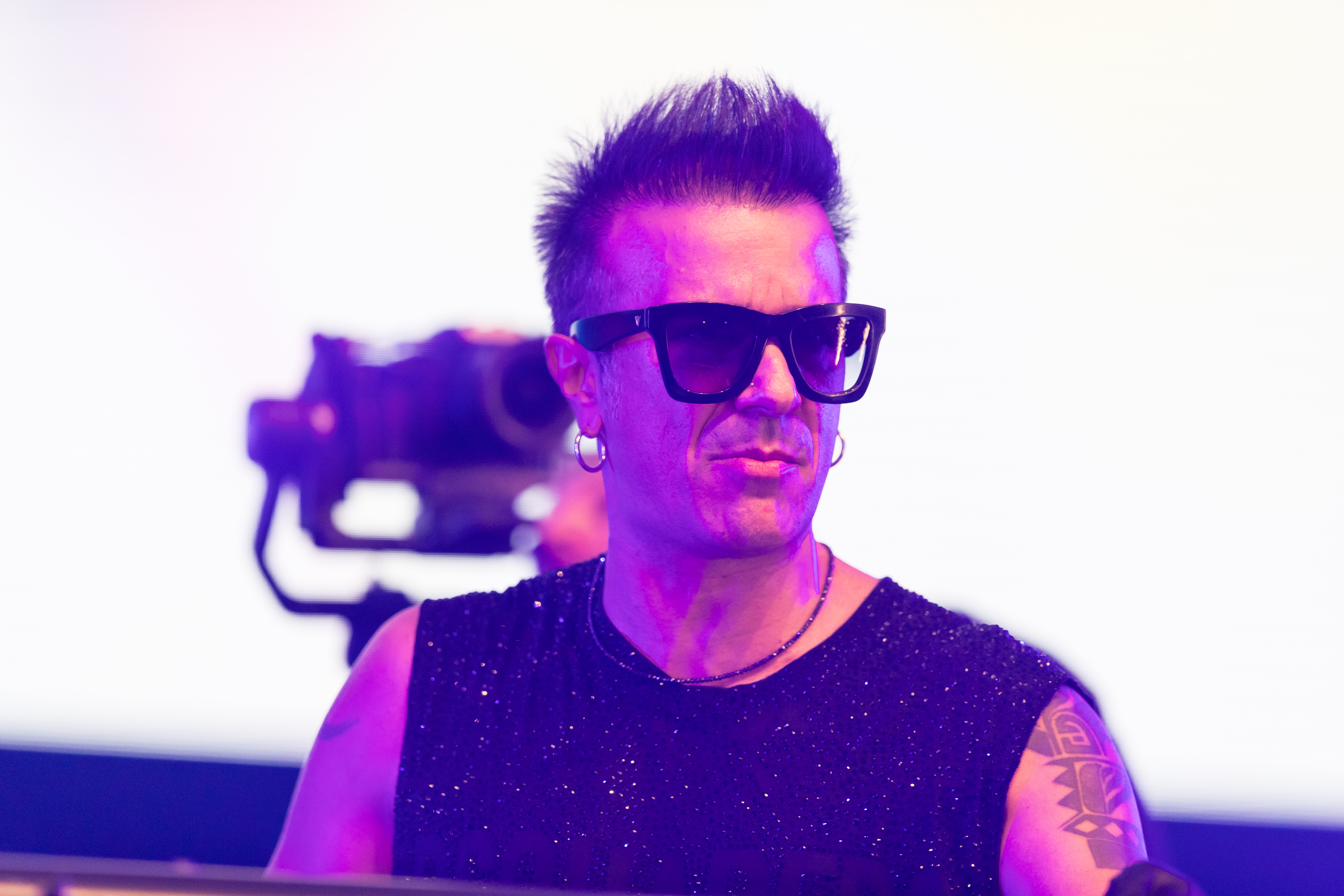
- Lobina in 2023

Background information
- Born: 30 October 1973 (age 52); Asti, Piedmont, Italy
- Genres: Eurodance, Italo dance, electronic
- Occupations: Musician, singer
- Instruments: Guitar, keyboards, vocals
- Years active: 1997–present

Maurizio Lobina (also known as Maury Lobina, born 30 October 1973) is an Italian musician and singer, most known as a member of the band Eiffel 65, an Italian group who hit big in 1999 with the international success "Blue (Da Ba Dee)." Lobina created the melody for the song "Blue" on a keyboard and asked vocalist Jeffrey Jey to "come up with strange lyrics" to accompany his piano riff. Producer Massimo Gabutti is another author of the track.

== Early life ==
Lobina was born on 30 October 1973, in Asti, a comune in the Italian region of Piedmont, to a Sardinian father and Calabrian mother. He moved with his family to Turin, in northern Italy, during his adolescence. He began playing the piano at the age of 5 and later learned to play the synthesizer and guitar. At the age of 14, he began his artistic career as a keyboardist, arranger, and composer.

Lobina is a former member of the band Vitanova. He left the band because the other members disliked dance music. Lobina says,

In 1991, I met Roberto Molinaro thanks to some girlfriends in common. He was an aspirant DJ and producer and I was an aspirant musician and producer. As soon as he saw me play the piano he started asking me to go with him in a new studio in Turin. I talked to the band but they didn't like dance music; they preferred rock or pop music. Anyway, nobody of them stopped me.

== Career ==
Lobina briefly left Bliss Corporation to do military service in 1994, and returned soon after to resume his musical career. In 1998, at the end of a typical working day at Bliss Corporation, Maury composed a tune mostly out of boredom and asked BlissCo. colleague Jeffrey Jey to invent some strange lyrics to complete the song. Within a few days, 'Blue (Da Ba Dee)' was composed, arranged, produced, recorded and released on vinyl in Italian stores.

He has a son, to whom he dedicated the song "Viaggia insieme a me". He also has a younger brother, Luca, who shot many of the group's album photos.

Following Eiffel 65's initial breakup in 2005, Maurizio joined Jeffrey Jey to form the band Bloom 06. In 2010, they both rejoined Eiffel 65 and are still touring as of 2024.
