= Jeffrey Jey =

Italian musical artist (born 1970)

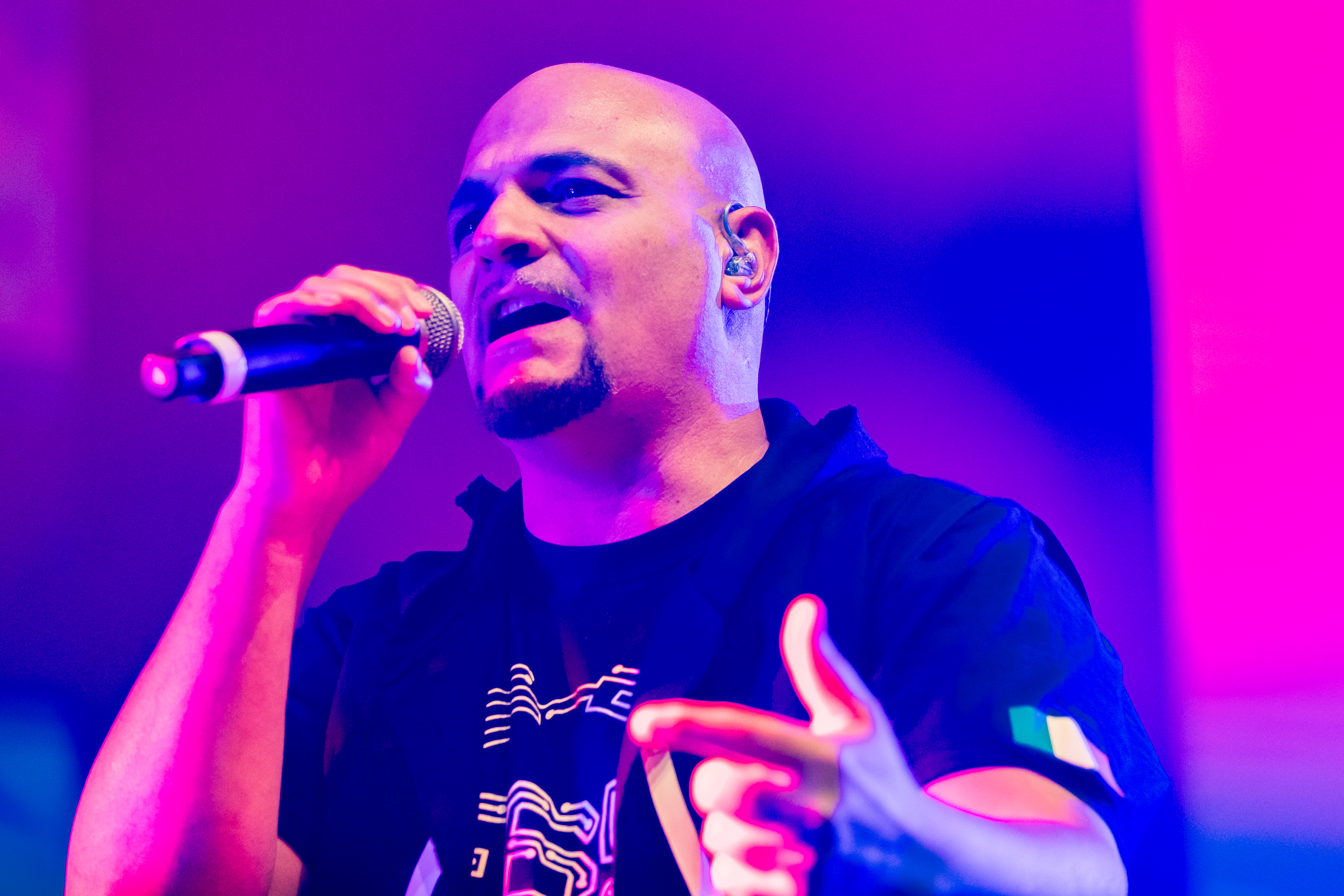
- Jeffrey Jey in 2023

Background information
- Also known as: Corey Randone
- Born: Gianfranco Randone; 5 January 1970 (age 56); Lentini, Italy
- Genres: Eurodance; Italo dance; electronic
- Occupations: Musician; singer-songwriter
- Instruments: Vocals; bass guitar; drums
- Years active: 1992–present

Gianfranco Randone (Italian pronunciation: [dʒaɱˈfraŋko ranˈdoːne]; born 5 January 1970), known by his stage name Jeffrey Jey, is an Italian musician and singer-songwriter, best known as the lead vocalist of the group Eiffel 65 (1997–2005, 2010–present). He was also the lead singer of the groups Bliss Team (1992–1997) and Bloom 06 (2005–2010). After Eiffel 65's reunion in June 2010, he toured Italy and Europe with the band. In addition to singing, Jey also plays bass guitar, electric guitar, drums and keyboards.

== Early life ==
Jey was born on 5 January 1970, in Lentini, in the province of Syracuse, Sicily. Two years later, Jey's father, Francesco, moved his family from Sicily to Brooklyn, New York in 1972 and returned to Italy in 1984. Due to Jey's father being a musician and the twelve years spent growing up in New York, he also had the opportunity to learn English and became interested in becoming a musician due to all the influences throughout the city. During that period, he also became passionate about martial arts after seeing a Bruce Lee film and began practicing his moves, trying his hand at various disciplines (Jeet Kune Do, MMA, and Thai boxing) over time, and to learn how to defend himself from bullies. He is fluent in both English and Italian.

Also while in the US, Jey came up with the stage name that would accompany him throughout his career as a musician: an American friend of his, who couldn't pronounce the name Gianfranco correctly, started calling him ‘Jeffrey’. Years later, Randone began working in nightclubs as an MJ (Mic Jockey) and, having to choose a pseudonym, he combined that name with the initials MJ, becoming Jeffrey Jey.

He comes from a family of musicians (his father, Francesco, played five instruments), but as a child he dreamed of becoming a surgeon, and his passion for singing emerged as a teenager. During the same period, he was impressed by the first sequencers and electronic music. Encouraged by his father, he began studying piano and developed a passion for it, entering the music world in 1991 as a singer and entertainer at the Malibù nightclub in Syracuse.

== Career ==
=== 1992–1998: Bliss Team ===
In January 1992, at the age of 23, Jey moved to Turin, where he began his professional career at Bliss Corporation as a singer, musician, and producer. The first project he lent his voice to was Bliss Team, a dance group formed with DJs and producers from the Turin club scene, formed by DJ Roberto Molinaro. The debut single, a cover of ‘’People Have the Power‘’ by Patti Smith, reached seventh place in the sales charts in 1993.

In 1994, he provided vocals for three songs by the band Da Blitz, also under contract with Bliss Corporation, performing the rap verses in the songs "Let me be", "Take my Way" and "Stay with me"; "Let Me Be" was particularly successful, reaching ninth place in the Italian dance singles chart on 12 February.

=== 1998–2005: Eiffel 65 ===
His activity in the Bliss Team lasted until 1998, placing other singles in the charts over the years, such as "Livin' on a Prayer" (a Bon Jovi cover), "You Make Me Cry", "Hold on to Love", and "Love is Forever". In the same year, he formed Eiffel 65 with Maurizio Lobina and Gabry Ponte. Their debut single, Blue (Da Ba Dee), became a worldwide hit the following year and received a nomination at the 2001 Grammy Awards in the “Best Dance Recording” category.

In 2003, Eiffel 65 participated in the 2003 Sanremo Music Festival with their song "Quelli che non hanno età" (Those Who Are Ageless), finishing in fifteenth place, though the song was the most played on the radio among those presented at the festival and the Turin group's performances were the most watched during the live broadcast on Rai 1. In the same year, he sang on Gabry Ponte's solo single "The Man in the Moon".

With Eiffel 65, he won triple platinum in the United States and diamond in France with the group's debut album Europop within six years, triple platinum in Germany, the United Kingdom, and Australia with "Blue (Da Ba Dee)", and platinum for every single released in Italy from the album Eiffel 65 (which in turn was awarded gold).

=== 2005–2010: Bloom 06 and solo work ===
In early March 2005, the group's DJ, Gabry Ponte, moved on from Eiffel 65 to focus on his solo career, and the following June, Jey and Lobina decided to leave Bliss Corporation to continue with their own production company, and founded Bloom 06, in which Jey plays bass, guitar, and drums. The following September, Eiffel 65 announced their initial breakup.

On 29 November 2012, Jey released his first solo single, entitled "Out Of Your Arms". At the end of that year, he provided vocals to Roby Giordana and Tom Bessan for the song "Knockout" and participated in the production of "Dragostea Din Tei 2K13" with Gabry Ponte, which was a single released on 7 January 2013.

On 8 March 2013, he released his new single "The Color Inside Her", produced by Luca Vicini, bassist for Subsonica, followed on 5 December by the video clip "Electronic Gangsta, produced" in collaboration with the electronic music group Urban Love by DJ and record producer Jois Audino.

In April 2015, he collaborated with Get Far and Provenzano on the single "Party With You", and in the same year, he collaborated with Robin Schulz singing on the track "Wave Goodbye" and sang on Roby Giordana and Paolo Noise's album Break The Beat.

=== 2016–present: Eiffel 65 reunion and further solo work ===
In 2016, Eiffel 65 announced their return — without Gabry Ponte — with a new single, "Panico", their first new release in twelve years since "Voglia di dance all night". The demo of the song was released on Bliss Corporation's official YouTube channel on 2 April, while the final version was released on 1 June, accompanied by an official video.

On 26 May 2017, Jey released the single "Adesso Per Sempre", followed on 6 October by the single "Sabbia". In 2018, in addition to continuing his solo career with the singles "Lega", "Da quando ci sei te", and "Settembre", he produced, in collaboration with Pilo and Pawax, the single by Roby Giordana and Paolo Noise, Vamos a la playa, sung by Adrian Rodriguez.

In February 2019, Jey collaborated with DJ Jump on the album Back To The Feat, performing the song "Decide", and on 12 April, he released the single "Se ci fosse un domani". On 24 January 2020, the single "War", by Angemi, featuring Jeffrey Jey on vocals, was released.

In 2021, Jey collaborated with Roberto Turatti and Chroma8 on the single My Lover.

== Discography ==
=== Singles ===
- "Out of Your Arms" (2012)
- "The Color Inside Her" (2013)
- "Adesso per sempre" (2017)
- "Sabbia" (2017)
- "Lega" (2018)
- "Settembre" (2018)
- "FOTO" (2020)
- "Just an Illusion" (2021)
