= Eiffel 65 =

Italian music group

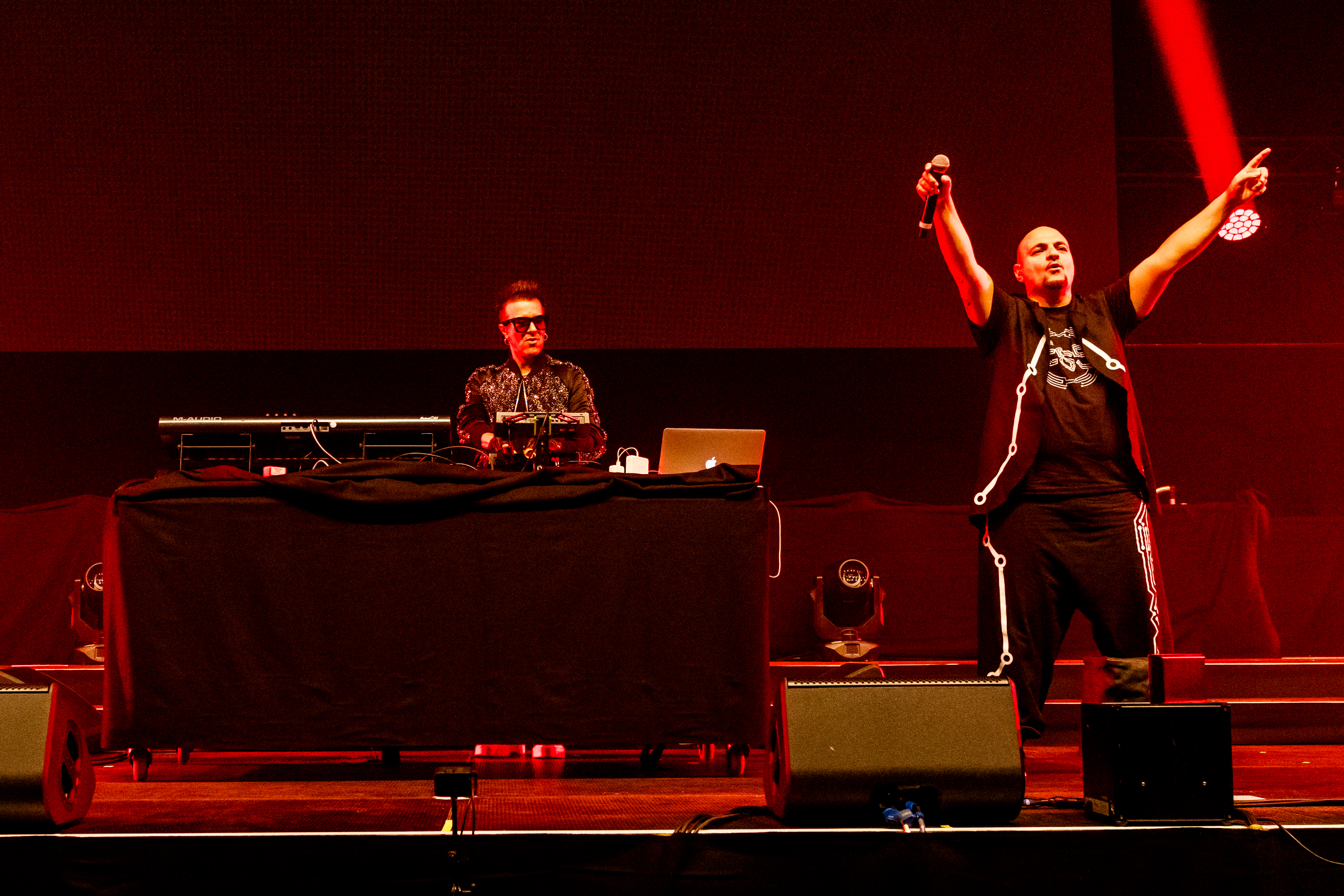
- Eiffel 65 performing in 2023

Background information
- Origin: Turin, Italy
- Genres: Eurodance
- Years active: 1997–2005; 2010–present
- Labels: BlissCo; Universal; Republic; WEA
- Spinoffs: Bloom 06
- Spinoff of: Bliss Team
- Members: Jeffrey Jey; Maurizio Lobina
- Past members: Gabry Ponte
- Website: eiffel65.com

Eiffel 65 are an Italian Eurodance group formed in 1997 in the studios of the Turin-based record company Bliss Corporation. The group consists of Jeffrey Jey, Maurizio Lobina, and formerly Gabry Ponte. They gained global popularity with their singles "Blue (Da Ba Dee)" and "Move Your Body" from their 1999 debut studio album Europop. The singles reached number one in many countries, while the album peaked at number four on the Billboard 200 chart. Their following two albums, Contact! (2001) and their self-titled Eiffel 65 (2003), did not gain international success, but still managed to gain success in Italy.

Throughout their career, the group won a World Music Award in 2000 for the World Best Selling Italian Group, and a BMI USA in Los Angeles, rewarding the most-broadcast song on radio in the United States. They were also nominated at the Grammy Award for Best Dance Recording for "Blue (Da Ba Dee)".

Eiffel 65 also produced remixes of numerous popular songs, and they recorded "One Goal", one of the official songs of the UEFA Euro 2000, and "Living in My City" for the 2006 Winter Olympics. With more than 20 million copies sold and many gold, platinum and diamond records, it is one of Italy's most popular electronic groups.

In 2005, Ponte focused on his solo career, while Jey and Lobina collaborated as a duo called Bloom 06. In 2010, the original group reunited, although Ponte no longer participates.

== History ==
=== 1992: Formation ===
Randone, Ponte and Lobina met at Bliss Corporation, which was founded in 1992 by Massimo Gabutti. A computer chose the name Eiffel randomly from a group of words the three had selected but the number 65 was added to it by mistake: the producer had written a phone number on a piece of paper and two digits of it ended up on the label copy. The graphic artist who received it assumed that it had been added afterwards so he just fused it to the band name for their first release.

=== 1992–2000: Breakthrough with Europop ===
Eiffel 65 became famous for their international chart-topping hits "Blue (Da Ba Dee)" and "Move Your Body". Both songs were featured singles on their debut album Europop, which was released on 22 November 1999.

The band achieved considerable success in Italy and the rest of Europe, in the United States, Canada, Australia, New Zealand, and Brazil. Europop peaked in the top five on the Billboard 200 and on the Billboard Canadian Albums chart. "Blue (Da Ba Dee)" peaked at number 6 on the Billboard Hot 100, reached No. 1 in the UK and in Germany and number 3 in Italy.

=== 2001–2005: Follow-up albums ===
Their second album, Contact!, was released in 2001, with "'80s Stars" peaking at No. 9 in Italy. A self-titled Eiffel 65 album was released in 2003.

Eiffel 65 also remixed, between 1999 and 2002, other artists' tracks like the Bloodhound Gang's "The Bad Touch", Nek's "La vita è", S Club 7's "Reach" and in early 2005, a remix of Yo Yo Mundi's "L'ultimo testimone".

=== 2005–2010: Bloom 06 and Crash Test 01 ===
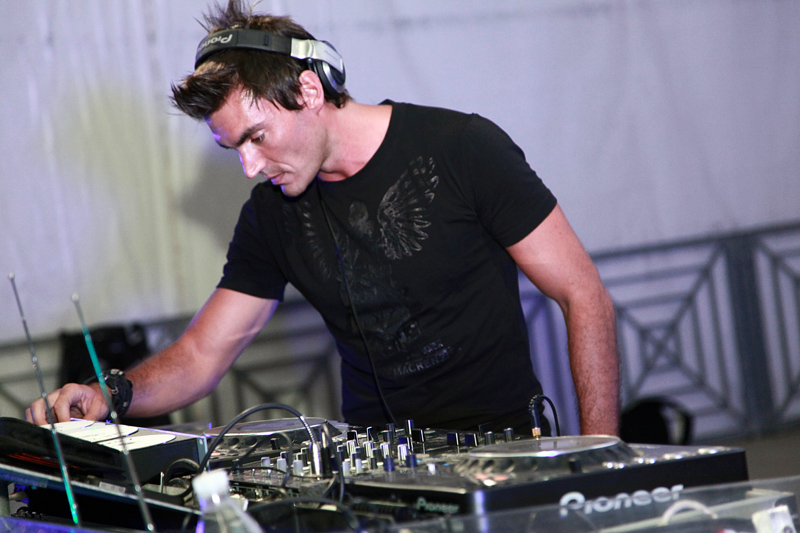
DJ Gabry Ponte

In early March 2005, the group's DJ, Gabry Ponte, went on to focus on his solo career. On 16 May 2005, the other two members, Maurizio Lobina and Jeffrey Jey, decided to leave Bliss Corporation to continue with their own production company. Since the name "Eiffel 65" was a property of Bliss Corporation, the duo decided to continue under a new name, as announced in June 2005, Bloom 06.

Eiffel 65's long-anticipated fourth album, under the working title Crash Test, had already finished production by the time of Maury and Jeffrey's departure from Bliss Corporation. It was renamed Crash Test 01 and was released by Bloom 06 on 13 October 2006. The album contains lyrics in English and Italian.

=== 2010–present: Reunion and recent work ===
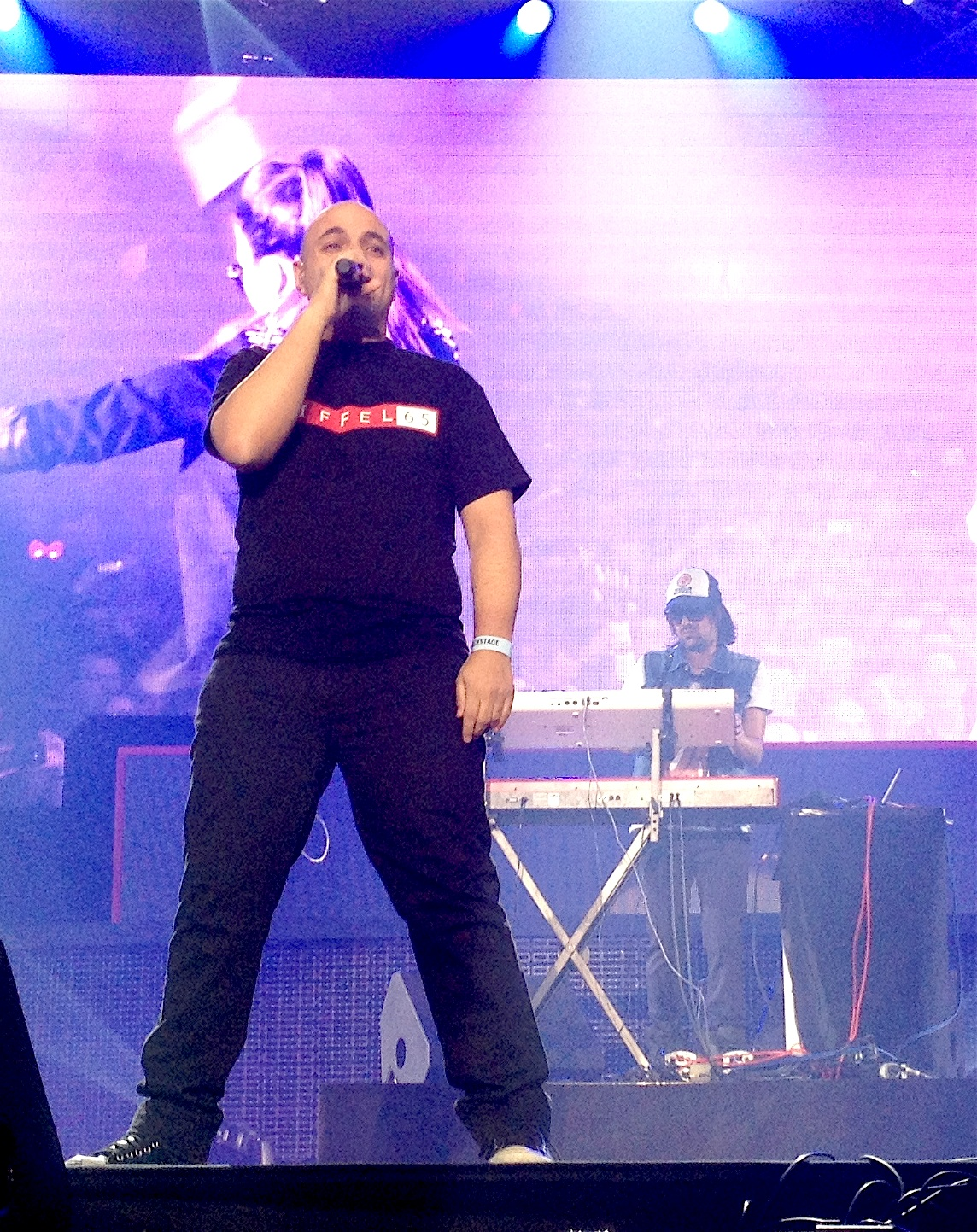
Lead singer Jeffrey Jey and keyboardist Maurizio Lobina performing at Ethias Arena, Hasselt (April 2013)

Bliss Corporation confirmed that a new Eiffel 65 lineup would make their debut in the summer of 2007 but the debut was postponed. In 2009, Bliss Corporation began to promote work from older bands by subtitling music videos and releasing "unseen" video footage from Eiffel 65. In June 2010, it was announced on the Bloom 06 website that Eiffel 65 would reunite once again to produce new music as well as touring. In an April 2012 interview, Jeffrey Jey commented on the progress of the new album:

The progress is slow because we work in three different places and of all the demos probably two, maybe three of these songs are what we call "the candidates" for our new single. We're not able to get a unanimous decision on one song, so that is what's making the release continuously slide. It's really hard to say when we will release a new song. Hopefully within the next two or three months we will be fixing the songs that we think are the good candidates and putting them online.

In the meantime, they toured Europe with their New Planet Tour, a multimedia show with wide screens, and in the summer of 2012, they announced a mini tour in Australia on their site.

On 2 April 2016, a demo of Eiffel 65's new single "Panico" was posted on Bliss Corporation's YouTube channel. "Panico" and its English version "Critical" were officially released on iTunes on 1 June 2016. However, their fourth album release date is still unknown.

In late February 2023, the group appeared on the list of artists who will compete in Una Voce Per San Marino, a song contest where the winning song will represent San Marino at the Eurovision Song Contest 2023 in Liverpool.

In May 2024, they released a new single "Bestiale" with Italian singer Loredana Bertè. They performed during the 2026 Winter Olympics closing ceremony in Verona, Italy.

== Zorotl ==
Zorotlekuykauo "Zorotl" Sushik IV is a character created by the Bliss Corporation and featured in the videos of "Blue (Da Ba Dee)", "Move Your Body" and "Lucky (In My Life)". Zorotl was supposed to be a malicious character but since he was designed with a funny round body, the authors of the "Blue (Da Ba Dee)" video decided to portray it as tender, changing the script and giving it a happy ending. In 2000, Bliss Corporation made a video for the unreleased Eiffel 65 song "I Wanna Be". An alpha version of the video appeared as enhanced content for Eiffel 65's single "Too Much of Heaven". The song is credited to Zorotl even though it was recorded by members of Eiffel 65, so Zorotl is considered a virtual group.

== Members ==
- Jeffrey Jey (Gianfranco Randone) – vocals, producer (1997–2005, 2010–present)
- Maury Lobina – producer, keyboards, keytar, piano (1997–2005, 2010–present)
- Gabry Ponte – DJ, producer (1997–2005, 2010–2014)
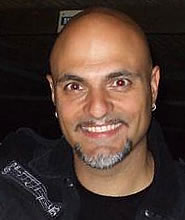
Jeffrey Jey

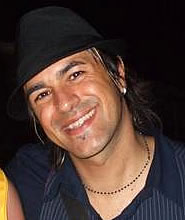
Maurizio Lobina

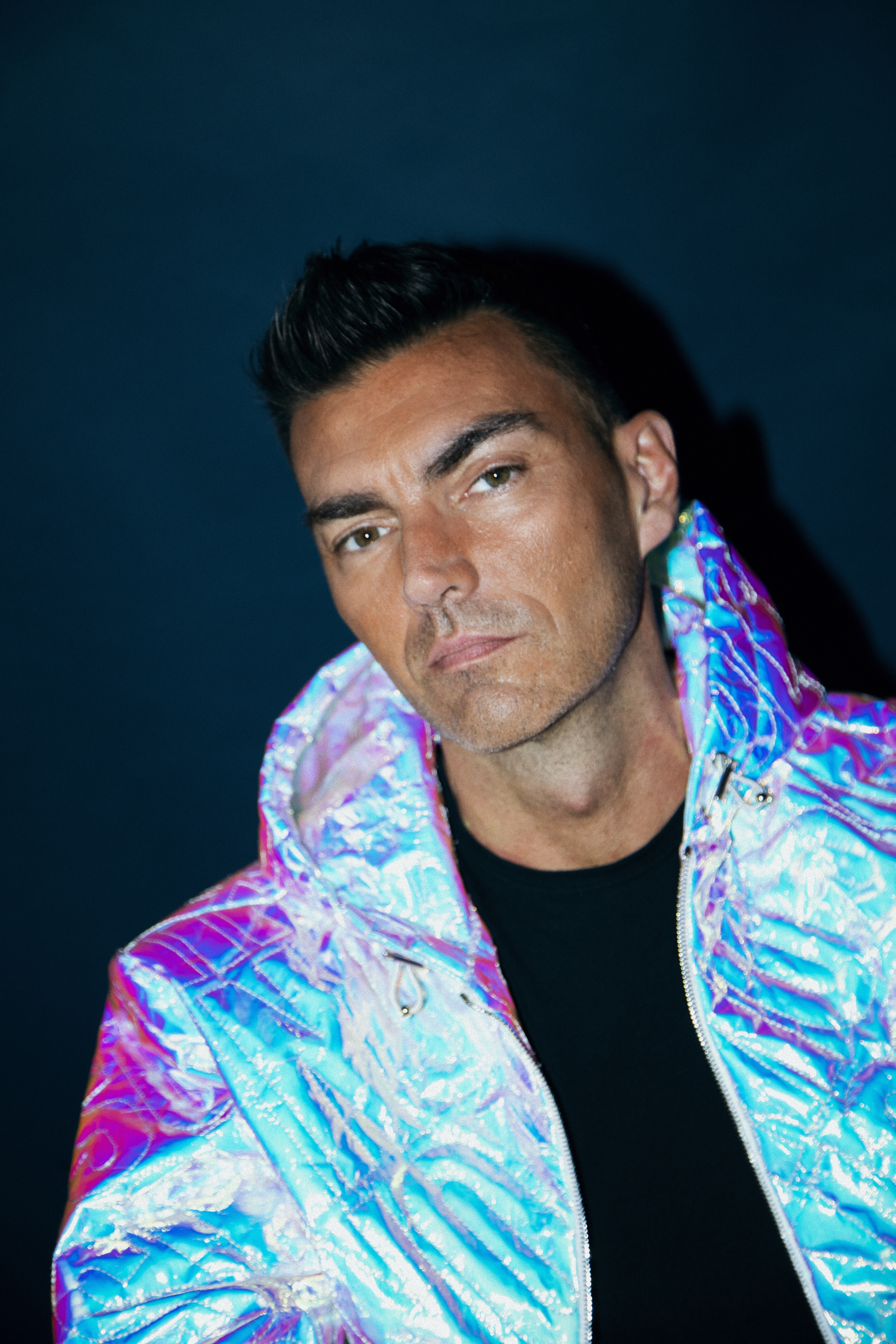
Gabry Ponte

== Discography ==
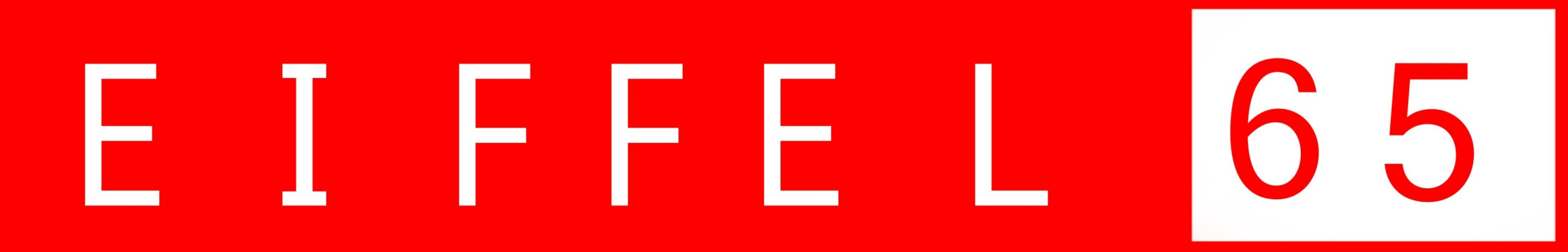
Eiffel 65 wordmark since 2001 (Note: Red variant used since 2003.)

- Europop (1999)
- Contact! (2001)
- Eiffel 65 (2003)

== Awards and nominations ==
Award	Year	Category	Nominee(s)	Result	Ref.
Amadeus Austrian Music Awards	2000	Best Dance Act	Themselves	Won	
BMI London Awards	2001	Pop Award	"Blue (Da Ba Dee)"	Won	
BMI London Awards	2001	Dance Award	"Blue (Da Ba Dee)"	Won	
BMI Pop Awards	2001	Award-Winning Song	"Blue (Da Ba Dee)"	Won	
Grammy Awards	2001	Best Dance Recording	"Blue (Da Ba Dee)"	Nominated	
World Music Awards	2000	World's Best Selling Italian Group	Themselves	Won	
Hungarian Music Awards	2000	Best Foreign Dance Album	Europop	Won	
International Dance Music Awards	2000	Best HiNRJ 12'	"Blue (Da Ba Dee)"	Won	
RSH Gold Awards	2000	Best Dance Act	Themselves	Won	
Smash Hits Poll Winners Party	1999	Best Dance Choon	"Blue (Da Ba Dee)"	Won	
The Record of the Year	1999	Record of the Year	"Blue (Da Ba Dee)"	Nominated	
