= Casey Rain =

British rapper

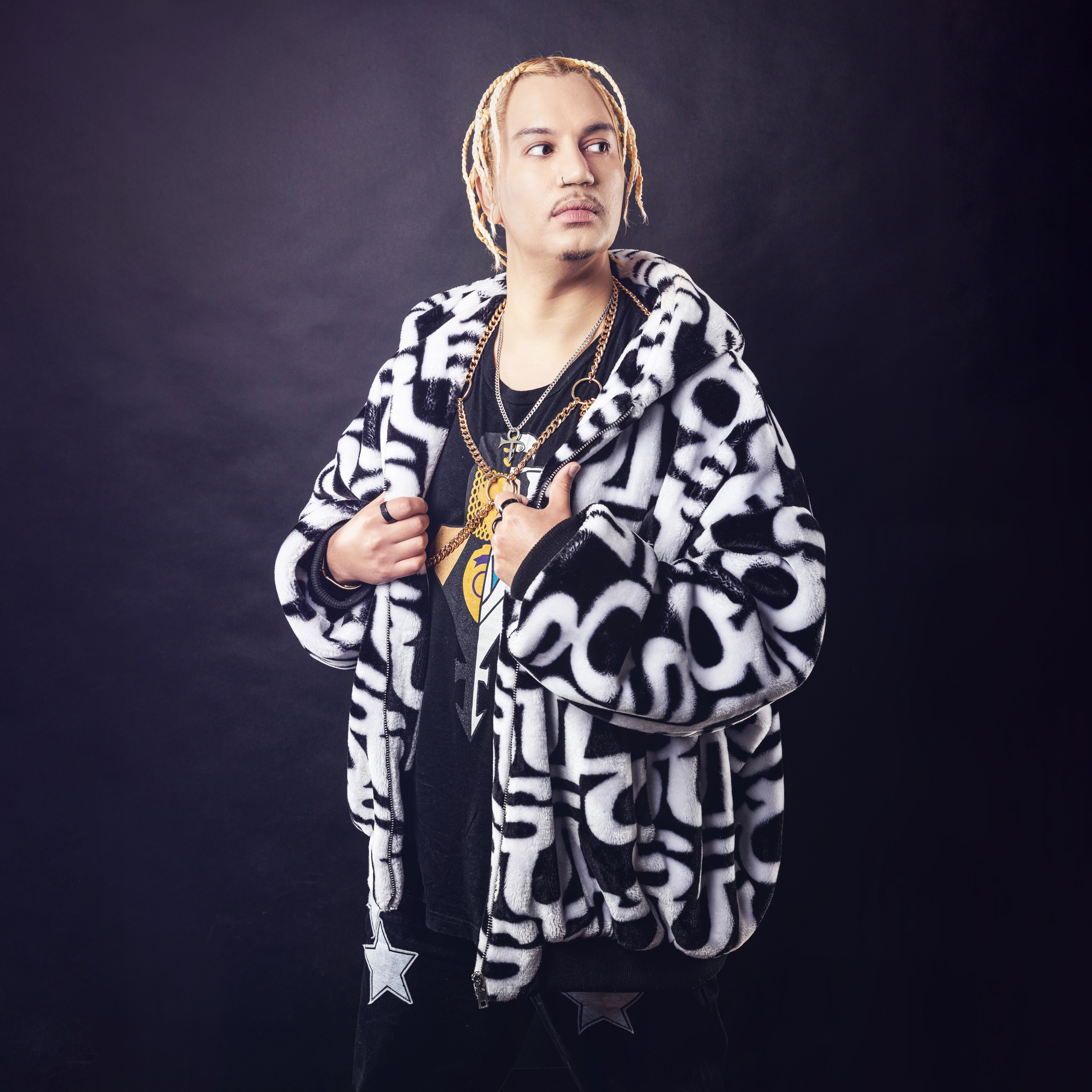
- Rain in 2023

Background information
- Also known as: S-Endz; Turi
- Origin: Birmingham, England
- Genres: Hip hop, rock, funk
- Occupations: Singer, songwriter, record producer, presenter, writer
- Instruments: Vocals, keyboard
- Years active: 2004–present
- Formerly of: Swami
- Website: s-endz.com

Casey Rain, also known as S-Endz and Turi, is a British Asian vocalist, music producer, songwriter, YouTuber and radio presenter. He is best known as a member of the UK rap/alternative/bhangra band Swami and co-founder of the media collective The Violet Reality.

He was a vegetarian for several years and now adheres to a vegan diet.

== History ==
Casey's first cousin Apache Indian broke the UK mainstream pop audience with a blend of bhangra and reggae produced by his cousins Simon "Subs" Duggal and Diamond "DJ Swami" Duggal. Subs & DJ Swami would later form the band Swami, which Casey would join as a vocalist in 2004.

== Career ==
=== with Swami ===
Casey, as S-Endz, contributed rap vocals to many of the tracks on the 2004 Swami release DesiRock and all of the tracks on the 2005 remixed rap-rock version of the album, entitled So Who Am I released on Sony BMG. This album became a significant milestone for British Asian music, winning many awards. S-Endz himself was awarded with a "Rowdiest MC" award by BBC Radio 1 DJ's Bobby Friction & DJ Nihal in 2005.

When asked to describe his musical style in a 2005 interview with UKBhangra.com, Casey replied:

"My musical style as a vocalist and performer is like the bastard child of DMX and Courtney Love that was babysat by Slipknot and taught to create music by Prince, Kurt Cobain and Tupac Shakur and then genetically modified with the soul of Jason Voorhees while he's wielding a chainsaw."

In 2007, Swami released the album Equalize internationally through EMI/Virgin Records to great acclaim. BBC Music suggested it could be "the Desi album of the year" and SimplyBhangra called it "nothing short of a masterpiece". The "4 Faces" album cover, featuring the outlines of Diamond, S-Endz, Sups and Bobby became the new Swami logo, appearing on flyers and merchandise. The album featured many international talents including Pras from The Fugees and South African R&B star Ishmael. In 2020, the song "Hey Hey" from this album was featured in the hit Netflix show Indian Matchmaking.

In Summer 2009, Swami began to promote an upcoming Greatest Hits compilation entitled 53431. The compilation includes two new songs, "Sugarless" and "Tonight" – both of which were co-written by and feature S-Endz. "Sugarless" was released as a free download in June 2009 to massive critical acclaim from fans and media alike. Indian music blog Bhangraw reported that this would be the last material from Swami that would include Punjabi vocals and that their next album would be entirely in English.

In March 2013, Swami released "Back It Up," the first single from their upcoming release UPGRADE. The song was written by S-Endz, DJ Swami and Liana McCarthy, features co-lead, chorus and rap vocals by S-Endz on the English Mix, and chorus/rap vocals on the Desi Mix. This was followed in 2014 by another single, "Do It Again", which was released with a music video shot in India. Both of these songs appeared in a remix form on two further Swami albums released in 2017, "Upgrade" and "Sidetrkd" on which S-Endz co-wrote and features on all songs.

=== Solo career ===
The USA/Canadian magazine ANOKHI featured an article on S-Endz in its Summer 2009 issue, stating that his debut album Emanate was scheduled for release in fall 2009, with the lead single, "Do U Wanna Come?", set for a summer release to coincide with live performances.

In October 2009, S-Endz released his debut solo EP, Outer Space. DesiHits.com described it as "truly a one of a kind track." Steven Anthony of The Musictionary rated the EP 7/10, calling it "incredibly fresh... like a cross between Trent Reznor and Kanye West," and referring to its sound as "Neofunk."

In February 2011, he announced "Fashion Part II (Neofunk Style)", a follow-up to Kazz Kumar’s single "Fashion", which was released later that spring.

On 25 January 2012, S-Endz released the EP Chapter 0: REINKARNAL. The first track, "Alone", was released on 11 February, followed by additional tracks every two weeks. The Birmingham Music Archive described "Do U Wanna Come?" as "Deep South Bounce from Birmingham's very own Prince/Outkast."

On 18 February 2025, Casey Rain released his debut single "Drown" under his own name, marking a new phase in his music career. This was followed by Drown – The Remix Collection on 20 June. These releases were his first solo works to be made available on Spotify and other streaming platforms.

=== As a presenter ===
In 2006, S-Endz presented a documentary about rap artist Tupac Shakur for British station BBC 1Xtra to mark the 10th anniversary of the artist's passing. The documentary contained interviews with Tupac's producers Johnny J and QD3 among others.

In 2011, S-Endz contributed to many documentaries in XFM's primetime "25" classic albums series – including co-producing and co-presenting an acclaimed episode about Prince & The Revolution's Parade.

In 2015, as Casey Rain, he co-founded The Violet Reality. Their YouTube channel has become the internet's primary source for updates and information on the career of Prince. In 2019, Casey Rain launched a radio show entitled The Phaseshift with his cousin and former bandmate DJ Swami for LA-based station Dash Radio.

=== As a writer ===
In August 2011, Casey Rain created the blog "Birmingham Riots 2011", to document the violent riots that occurred in the aftermath of the Death of Mark Duggan. The blog went viral, with 3 million hits in three days, and as a result Casey was interviewed on the BBC, in The Economist magazine (who stated that police found themselves trailing Casey Rain in intelligence-gathering), and numerous international newspapers. This led to Casey becoming an official contributor to The Guardian newspaper. and his writing on the roots of violence was quoted on the popular Racialicious blog. In late 2011, Casey was given an award by the West Midlands Police in recognition of the blog's popularity.

In 2014, Casey wrote a review of a performance by pop artist Prince for the music blog Nada Brahma. This review was later quoted in official Prince live video from that night.

=== Other ===
In 2010, S-Endz appeared in the music documentary Made in Birmingham : Reggae Punk Bhangra – an independent documentary covering Birmingham's role in popular music. The documentary has been shown across the UK and is being submitted for international film festivals in 2011.

== Discography ==
With Swami:

- DesiRock (Roma II, 2004)
- So Who Am I (Sony BMG, 2005)
- Equalize (Virgin/EMI, 2007)
- Electro Jugni/She's Mine (InGrooves, 2009)
- 53431 (Virgin/EMI, 2009)
- Upgrade in Progress (DesiRock Ent, 2015)
- Upgrade (DesiRock Ent, 2017)
- Sidetrkd (DesiRock Ent, 2017)

Solo tracks released:

- "Drown" (2025)

Solo albums and EPs:

- Outer Space EP (2009)
- Chapter 0 : REINKARNAL (2012)
- Drown – The Remix Collection (2025)

Guest appearances:

- backing vocals on "Get Loose!" by Apache Indian & Pras (2005)
- featured on "O Sikander (International Dance Mix)" produced by DJ Swami from the Bollywood film Corporate (2006)
- featured on "Wise in the Mind" by Fusing Naked Beats (2007)
- produced and featured on "Fashion Part II (Neofunk Style)" by Kazz Kumar (2011)

== Filmography ==
Year	Film	Role	Type	Miscellaneous
2010	Made in Birmingham : Reggae Punk Bhangra	Himself	Music Documentary	
