= What'cha Wanna Do =

Single by Pras Michel featuring The Product G&B and Free

from the album Ghetto Supastar
- Released: January 1999
- Recorded: 1998
- Genre: Hip-hop
- Length: 3:57
- Label: Columbia Records
- Songwriter: Pras Michel
- Producers: Matty Kats; Pras

Pras Michel featuring The Product G&B and Free singles chronology
"Blue Angels" (1998)	"What'cha Wanna Do" (1999)	"Another One Bites the Dust" (1998)

"What'cha Wanna Do" is a hip hop song by Pras Michel, released as the fourth single from his debut solo studio album, Ghetto Supastar. The track features vocals from American group The Product G&B and rapper Free. The single was due to be released on September 28, 1998, but was pulled, and a last minute replacement, Blue Angels, was released instead. The single was later released in the United States in January 1999, and a music video was filmed. The single was scheduled for release in the United Kingdom in February 1999, but was once again pulled. Some copies of the single found their way onto the shelves. The music video (directed by William Heins) features Michel performing the song in a club, surrounded by people. It also shows him visiting a camp on Hawaii beach, and performing in between a group of girls, surrounded by palm trees. The Product G&B make an appearance in the video.

== Track listing ==
- UK CD1
1. "What'cha Wanna Do" (4:12)
2. "What'cha Wanna Do" (The Neptunes Bang Your Head Remix) (feat. Pharrell, Kelis and Clipse) (4:25)
3. "What'cha Wanna Do" (Seani B Remix) (4:51)
- UK CD2
1. "What'cha Wanna Do" (Stonebridge's Roots 'N' Culture Mix)
2. "What'cha Wanna Do" (Stonebridge's Roots 'N' Bass Mix)
3. "What'cha Wanna Do" (Jason Nevins Hip-Hop-Don't-Stop Remix)
4. "Blue Angels" (Seani B Remix - Long Version) (featuring Zagu Zarr)

== Charts ==
Chart (1999)	Peak position
UK Singles (Official Charts)	72
