= Miss California (song) =

2001 single by Dante Thomas

Single by Dante Thomas featuring Pras

from the album Fly
- Released: February 20, 2001
- Length: 3:27
- Label: Elektra; Rat Pack Entertainment
- Songwriter: Rasheem "Kilo" Pugh
- Producer: Vada Nobles

Dante Thomas singles chronology
"Miss California" (2001)	"Fly" (2001)

Pras singles chronology
"Another One Bites the Dust" (1998)	"Miss California" (2001)	"Haven't Found" (2005)

Music video
- "Miss California" on YouTube

"Miss California" is a song by American singer Dante Thomas, featuring American rapper and former Fugees member Pras Michel. It was released on February 20, 2001, as the lead single from his debut album, Fly. Despite peaking at number 85 on the US Billboard Hot 100, the track was an international hit, topping the charts of Denmark, Germany, and the Netherlands and becoming a top-five hit in Australia, New Zealand, and several other mainland European countries. Cameron Casey directed the song's music video.

== Track listings ==
US CD single

1. "Miss California" (radio edit)
2. "Miss California" (rap remix)

US maxi-CD single

1. "Miss California" (album version)
2. "Miss California" (rap remix)
3. "Miss California" (Bastone & Bernstein club mix)
4. "Miss California" (Bastone & Bernstein Cali dub)
5. "Miss California" (radio edit without Pras)
6. "Miss California" (original TV track)
7. "Miss California" (acapella)

UK and Australian CD single; UK 12-inch single

1. "Miss California" (radio version no rap) – 3:28
2. "Miss California" (radio version with rap) – 4:08
3. "Miss California" (Bastone & Bernstein radio mix) – 3:08
4. "Miss California" (Bastone & Bernstein club mix) – 7:44

European CD single

1. "Miss California" (radio version with Pras) – 4:08
2. "Miss California" (radio version no rap) – 3:28

European cassette single

1. "Miss California" (radio version no rap) – 3:28
2. "Miss California" (radio version with rap) – 4:08

== Charts ==
=== Weekly charts ===
Chart (2001)	Peak position
Australia (ARIA)	5
Australian Urban (ARIA)	2
Austria (Ö3 Austria Top 40)	4
Belgium (Ultratop 50 Flanders)	13
Belgium (Ultratop 50 Wallonia)	2
Denmark (Tracklisten)	1
Europe (Eurochart Hot 100)	3
France (SNEP)	3
Germany (GfK)	1
Hungary (Mahasz)	5
Italy (FIMI)	20
Netherlands (Dutch Top 40)	1
Netherlands (Single Top 100)	2
New Zealand (Recorded Music NZ)	5
Norway (VG-lista)	13
Poland Airplay (Music & Media)	10
Poland (Nielsen Music Control)	4
Romania (Romanian Top 100)	3
Scottish Singles Sales (Official Charts)	40
Sweden (Sverigetopplistan)	6
Switzerland (Schweizer Hitparade)	2
UK Singles (Official Charts)	25
UK Dance (Official Charts)	18
UK Hip Hop/R&B (Official Charts)	7
US Billboard Hot 100	85
US Hot R&B/Hip-Hop Songs (Billboard)	88
US Pop Airplay (Billboard)	31

=== Year-end charts ===
Chart (2001)	Position
Australia (ARIA)	43
Austria (Ö3 Austria Top 40)	33
Belgium (Ultratop 50 Flanders)	86
Belgium (Ultratop 50 Wallonia)	34
Europe (Eurochart Hot 100)	26
France (SNEP)	23
Germany (Media Control)	17
Netherlands (Dutch Top 40)	21
Netherlands (Single Top 100)	27
Romania (Romanian Top 100)	21
Sweden (Hitlistan)	53
Switzerland (Schweizer Hitparade)	20

== Certifications ==
Region	Certification	Certified units/sales
Australia (ARIA)	Gold	35,000^{^}
Belgium (BRMA)	Gold	25,000^{*}
France (SNEP)	Gold	250,000^{*}
Germany (BVMI)	Gold	250,000^{^}
Sweden (GLF)	Gold	15,000^{^}
Switzerland (IFPI Switzerland)	Gold	20,000^{^}
^{*} Sales figures based on certification alone.^{^} Shipments figures based on certification alone.

== Release history ==
Region	Date	Format(s)	Label(s)	Ref(s).
United States	February 20, 2001	Rhythmic contemporary radio	Elektra; Rat Pack Entertainment	
United States	April 24, 2001	Contemporary hit radio	Elektra; Rat Pack Entertainment	
Europe	July 2001	CD; cassette	EastWest; Rat Pack Entertainment	
United Kingdom	August 20, 2001	12-inch vinyl; CD	Elektra; Rat Pack Entertainment	
Australia	September 24, 2001	CD	Warner Music Australia	
