= Sugarless (song) =

Single by Swami

from the album 53431
- Released: June 12, 2009
- Genre: Electro, pop
- Length: 4.03
- Label: DesiRock/Cigale Entertainment
- Songwriter(s): DJ Swami, S-Endz, Liana McCarthy
- Producer(s): DJ Swami

Swami singles chronology
"Electro Jugni" (2008)	"Sugarless" (2009)	"Back It Up" (2013)

"Sugarless" is the first single from Swami's 2009 greatest hits compilation 53431.

Initially released as a free download on the popular Asian entertainment website DesiHits.com, the track quickly gained steam in the UK and North America, garnering critical acclaim from popular Asian media outlets such as the BBC Asian Network. Written by Diamond Duggal aka DJ Swami, S-Endz and Liana McCarthy, the song is an electronic pop song with driving percussion and a combination of male vocals sung by Sups and rapped by S-Endz and a female chorus sung by McCarthy.

The tracks popularity continued throughout 2009, and it was listed as the #2 song of 2009 by BBC Asian Network DJ Bobby Friction.

== Music video ==
A music video for the song was released in late 2009, compiling live and rehearsed footage of the band.
