= Win Lose or Draw (album) =

Studio album by Pras Michel
- Released: August 16, 2005
- Recorded: 2005
- Genres: Hip hop; pop-rap; reggae fusion
- Length: 53:57
- Label: Universal Music Group
- Producers: Pras; Wyclef Jean

Pras Michel chronology
Ghetto Supastar (1998)	Win Lose or Draw (2005)

Singles from Win Lose or Draw
- 1. "Haven't Found" Released: 6 June 2005

Professional ratings
Review scores
Source	Rating
Allmusic	2/5 stars
Chicago Tribune	(unfavorable)
Entertainment Weekly	D
IGN	(7/10)
RapReviews	(4/10)
USA Today	3/4 stars

Win Lose or Draw is the second studio album released by American rapper and former Fugee Pras Michel. The album was released on August 16, 2005. Only one single, "Haven't Found", was released from the album, on June 16, 2005. The album was entirely produced by Pras and Wyclef Jean.

== Track listing ==
No.	Title	Lyrics	Music	Producer(s)	Length
1.	"Win Lose or Draw"	Pras Michel; Frank Sneed	Sneed; Eric Johnson; Michael Peeples	The Executive Producers	3:40
2.	"Dreamin'"	Michel	Sneed; Johnson; Peeples	The Executive Producers	4:47
3.	"Light My Fire"	Michel	Brandon Parrott; Michel	Brandon "DirtyBird" Parrott; Pras Michel	3:28
4.	"Dance Hall" (featuring Sean Paul and Spragga Benz)	Michel; Sean Paul; Spragga Benz	Salaam Remi; Michel	Salaam Remi; Pras Michel	4:31
5.	"Haven't Found"	Bono; The Edge	U2	Pras Michel	3:30
6.	"For Love"	Michel; Sharli McQueen	Wyclef Jean; Jerry Duplessis	Wyclef Jean; Jerry "Wonda" Duplessis	4:39
7.	"Mistakes"	Michel; Sneed; R. Greene	Michel	Pras Michel	4:20
8.	"Angels Sing" (featuring Wyclef Jean)	Michel; Jean	Jean; Duplessis	Wyclef Jean; Jerry "Wonda" Duplessis	6:04
9.	"Mr. Martin" (featuring Akon)	Michel	Carlos Hassan; Michel; Jean; Duplessis	The Synphony; Wyclef Jean; Jerry "Wonda" Duplessis; Pras Michel	3:49
10.	"One Monkey Don't Stop the Show"	Michel	Hassan; Sandy Lal	The Synphony	4:01
11.	"Friend A' Foe"	Michel	Sneed; Johnson; Peeples	The Executive Producers	4:11
12.	"Party's Ova'"	Michel; Sneed; Mister	Jean; Duplessis	Wyclef Jean; Jerry "Wonda" Duplessis	3:39
13.	"Ghetto Politics"	Michel; Temp	Michel; Temp	Pras Michel; Temp	3:40
14.	"How It Feels"	Michel	Addaryll Wilson	Best Kept Secret; Pras Michel	4:11

UK bonus track
No.	Title	Length
15.	"Money"

Japanese bonus tracks
No.	Title	Length
16.	"Light My Fire (DJ Swami Remix)"
17.	"Dreamin' (Euro Remix)"

Sample credits

- "Mistakes" contains samples from "You're My Girl", written by Norman Whitfield, and performed by Rose Royce.

== Production credits ==
- Warren Riker: Engineer, Mixing
- Mack 10: Performer
- Wyclef Jean: Guitar, Producer, Executive Producer
- Chris Theis: Engineer, Mixing
- Davis Factor Photography
- Pras: Producer, Executive Producer, Main Performer
- Lisa Michelle: Stylist
- Jayson Dyer: Assistant Engineer
- Dawn Fitch: Digital Imaging
- Veronica Fletcher: Hair Stylist
- A Kid Called Roots: Producer
- Nancie Stern: Sample Clearance
- Mario DeArce: Engineer
- Che: Producer
- Will Quinnell: Mastering
- Rev. Richard White: Graphic Assistant
- Phil Blackman: Engineer
- Brain: Art Direction
- Lenny Kravitz: Guitar
