= Feeling So Blue =

Single by Michael Mind Project featuring Dante Thomas
- Released: June 15, 2012
- Recorded: 2012
- Genre: Eurodance
- Length: 3:42
- Label: Kontor Records
- Songwriter(s): Jens Kindervater, Marcus Brosch, Jenson Vaughan, Frank Bülles, Darin Eugene Espinoza, Maurizio Lobina, Gianfranco Randone, Massimo Gabutti

Michael Mind Project singles chronology
"Rio De Janeiro" (2011)	"Feeling So Blue" (2012)

Dante Thomas singles chronology
"Diese Tage" (2012)	"Feeling So Blue" (2012)

Music video
- "Feeling So Blue" on YouTube

"Feeling So Blue" is a song by German musical group Michael Mind Project headed by German music producer and DJ Michael Mind. The single features vocals from American singer Dante Thomas. It was released on 15 June 2012 becoming a hit in France, Germany, Austria and Switzerland.

== Charts ==
Chart (2012)	Peak position
Austria (Ö3 Austria Top 40)	20
Belgium (Ultratip Bubbling Under Flanders)	35
France (SNEP)	125
Germany (GfK)	38
Switzerland (Schweizer Hitparade)	40

== See also ==
- Blue (Da Ba Dee)
