= Sugarless =

Sugarless may refer to:

- "Sugarless" (song), a 2009 song by the bhangra band Swami
- Sugarless (manga), a manga series by Masami Hosokawa
- Sugarless (film), a 2022 Indian film directed by K. M. Shashidhar
- Sugarless Girl, a 2007 album by Capsule
