= Another One Bites the Dust =

1980 single by Queen

- UK picture sleeve

Single by Queen

from the album The Game
- B-side: "Don't Try Suicide" (US); "Dragon Attack" (UK)
- Released: 16 August 1980
- Recorded: 1980
- Studio: Musicland, Munich
- Genre: Funk rock; disco
- Length: 3:35
- Label: EMI (UK); Elektra (US)
- Songwriter: John Deacon
- Producer: Queen

Queen singles chronology
"Play the Game" (1980)	"Another One Bites the Dust" (1980)	"Need Your Loving Tonight" (1980)

Music video
- "Another One Bites the Dust" on YouTube

"Another One Bites the Dust" is a song by the British rock band Queen. Written by bassist John Deacon, the song was featured on the group's eighth studio album, The Game (1980). It was a worldwide hit, charting at number one on the US Billboard Hot 100 for three weeks, from 4 October to 18 October (being their second and final number one single in the country). The song spent 15 weeks in the Billboard top 10 (the longest running top ten song of 1980), including 13 weeks in the top five, and 31 weeks total on the chart (more than any other song in 1980). It reached number two on the Hot Soul Singles chart and the Disco Top 100 chart, and number seven on the UK Singles Chart. The song is credited as Queen's best-selling single, with sales of over 7 million copies. This version was ranked at number 34 on Billboard's All-Time Top Songs.

The song won an American Music Award for Favorite Rock Single and also garnered a Grammy Award nomination for Best Rock Performance by a Duo or Group with Vocal. "Another One Bites the Dust" has been covered, remixed and sampled by many artists since its release, and has also appeared in TV shows, commercials, films and other media. The song has also featured at sports events.

== History ==
John Deacon's bass line was inspired by "Good Times" by the disco group Chic. In an interview with NME, Chic co-founder Bernard Edwards stated, "That Queen record came about because that Queen bass player ... spent some time hanging out with us at our studio."

Recording sessions, produced by Reinhold Mack at Musicland Studios in Munich, consisted of Deacon playing almost all instruments: bass guitar, piano, electric guitar and handclaps. Roger Taylor added a drum loop and Brian May contributed depth to music with his guitar and an Eventide Harmonizer. There are no synthesisers in the song: all effects are created by piano, electric guitars and drums, with subsequent tape playback performed in reverse at various speeds. Finally, sound effects were run through the harmonizer for further processing. The effect of the harmonizer can be heard clearly in the "swirling" nature of the sound immediately before the first lyric. In early live performances, Taylor sang lead on the chorus, as opposed to the studio version sung entirely by Mercury. As the song became more well-known, the band could rely on audiences to sing the chorus by themselves. After attending a Queen concert in Los Angeles, Michael Jackson suggested to Freddie Mercury backstage that "Another One Bites the Dust" be released as a single.

At the 1981 American Music Awards on 30 January, "Another One Bites the Dust" won the award for Favorite Pop/Rock Single. The song also garnered Queen a Grammy nomination for Best Rock Performance by a Duo or Group with Vocal. It lost to Bob Seger's "Against the Wind". The music video for "Another One Bites the Dust" was filmed at Reunion Arena in Dallas, Texas on 9 August 1980. The song also appears in Queen's Greatest Hits album in 1981.

To "bite the dust" means to die or to lose in a contest or game. The beginning lyrics set up a scene similar to a mobster movie, with "machine guns ready to go". Later lyrics refer to a failed relationship as "another one bites the dust". The singer is not going to let it get him down, "standing on my own two feet". The song was used in a preliminary cut of Rocky III, before being replaced by Survivor's "Eye of the Tiger". "When one of my idols, Brian May, attended one of our shows in Los Angeles in 1984, he brought up that subject", recalled Survivor guitarist Frankie Sullivan, to whom Sylvester Stallone had supplied a copy of the film. "I offered to send him a copy of the tape, which I still own."

== Critical reception ==
Billboard called it a "snarling track" with a "spare, lean sound." Record World said that "a brutal bass conspires with the sing-along hook on this thoroughly contagious [song]." Classic Rock History critic Millie Zeiler rated it John Deacon's 2nd best Queen song.

== Alleged backward masking ==
'Another One Bites the Dust' (section)
The claimed backmasked section of "Another One Bites the Dust".

"Another One Bites the Dust" (section) (reversed)
The same section, reversed.

In the early 1980s, "Another One Bites the Dust" was one of many popular rock songs that some Christian evangelists alleged contained subliminal messages through a technique called backmasking. It was claimed that the chorus, when played in reverse, can be heard as "Decide to smoke marijuana", "It's fun to smoke marijuana", or "Start to smoke marijuana". A spokeswoman for Hollywood Records (Queen's current US label) has denied that the song contains such a message. The song does, however, contain a backmasked piano, which can be heard clearly when it is played backward.

== Use in medical training ==
"Another One Bites the Dust" was used in a study to train medical professionals to provide the correct number of chest compressions per minute while performing CPR. The bassline has close to 110 beats per minute, and 100–120 chest compressions per minute are recommended by the British Heart Foundation, and endorsed by the Resuscitation Council (UK). A study evaluating CPR chest compression rates in veterinarians and registered veterinary nurses found that Queen's "Another One Bites the Dust" helped improve the accuracy of compression rates. When used as an auditory aid, the song resulted in a significantly higher number of participants achieving the correct rate of 100–120 compressions per minute, outperforming other aids like the Bee Gees' "Stayin' Alive". However, the content of the lyrics was not considered "quite as appropriate".

== Samples and interpolations ==
Gwen Stefani would include a melodic and lyrical interpolation of "Another One Bites the Dust" on her 2005 song "Hollaback Girl".

Def Leppard's 2015 song "Man Enough", from their 2015 album Def Leppard, has been described by Classic Rock Magazine as ripping off "Another One Bites the Dust".

== Personnel ==
- Freddie Mercury – lead and backing vocals
- Brian May – electric guitar
- Roger Taylor – drums
- John Deacon – bass guitar, electric guitar, piano, percussion

== Charts and certifications ==
=== Weekly charts ===
==== Original release ====
Chart (1980–1981)	Peak position
Australia (Kent Music Report)	5
Argentina (CAPIF)	1
Austria (Ö3 Austria Top 40)	6
Belgium (Ultratop 50 Flanders)	9
Canada Top Singles (RPM)	1
France (IFOP)	24
Ireland (IRMA)	6
Israel	1
Italy (Musica e Dischi)	10
Netherlands (Dutch Top 40)	14
Netherlands (Single Top 100)	11
New Zealand (Recorded Music NZ)	2
South Africa (Springbok Radio)	3
Spain (AFYVE)	1
Sweden (Sverigetopplistan)	12
Switzerland (Schweizer Hitparade)	8
UK Singles (Official Charts)	7
US Billboard Hot 100	1
US Hot Disco Singles (Billboard)	2
US Hot Soul Singles (Billboard)	2
US Cash Box Top 100	1
West Germany (GfK)	6

Chart (2018–2019)	Position
Australia (ARIA)	37
Canada (Hot Canadian Digital Songs)	19
France (SNEP)	84
Italy (FIMI)	51
US Hot Rock & Alternative Songs (Billboard)	4

Chart (2021–2022)	Position
Global 200 (Billboard)	156

==== Reissues ====
Chart (2003)	Position
France (SNEP)	48

Chart (2011)	Position
Belgium (Back Catalogue Singles Flanders)	13

=== Year-end charts ===
Chart (1980)	Position
Australia (Kent Music Report)	72
Belgium (Ultratop 50 Flanders)	69
Canada Top Singles (RPM)	33
Netherlands (Dutch Top 40)	92
Netherlands (Single Top 100)	68
New Zealand (Recorded Music NZ)	38
UK Singles (Gallup)	97
US Cash Box Top 100	1

Chart (1981)	Position
Australia (Kent Music Report)	65
US Billboard Hot 100	65
West Germany (Official German Charts)	71

Chart (2018)	Position
US Hot Rock Songs (Billboard)	75

Chart (2019)	Position
US Hot Rock Songs (Billboard)	17

=== Certifications and sales ===
Region	Certification	Certified units/sales
Australia (ARIA)	4× Platinum	280,000^{‡}
Brazil (Pro-Música Brasil)	Gold	30,000^{‡}
Canada	—	100,000
Denmark (IFPI Danmark)	2× Platinum	180,000^{‡}
Germany (BVMI)	Platinum	600,000^{‡}
New Zealand (RMNZ)	6× Platinum	180,000^{‡}
Philippines (PARI)	Gold	50,000
Spain (Promusicae)	2× Platinum	120,000^{‡}
United Kingdom (BPI)	4× Platinum	2,400,000^{‡}
United States (RIAA)	9× Platinum	9,000,000^{‡}
Streaming
Greece (IFPI Greece)	Gold	1,000,000^{†}
^{‡} Sales+streaming figures based on certification alone.^{†} Streaming-only figures based on certification alone.

=== All-time charts ===
Chart (1958–2021)	Position
US Billboard Hot 100	48

== Hollywood Records remixes ==
The first official remix of "Another One Bites The Dust" was Phase 5's Long Dusted B-Boy version, which was released on the Hollywood BASIC compilation BASIC Beats Sampler in early 1992. The remix featured a new rap verse by Money-B of Raw Fusion and contained many samples from other records including, but not limited to, "Flash" by Queen themselves, "The Breaks" by Kurtis Blow, "I Know You Got Soul" by Eric B. & Rakim, "Good Times" by Chic and "It's Too Funky in Here" by James Brown.

Dave Ogilvie edited the Phase 5 remix for inclusion on the April 1992 compilation BASIC Queen Bootlegs removing profanity from the rap verse and problematic samples due to copyright clearance. A separate remix by Onyx producer ChySkillz was due to appear featuring rap verses by Ice Cube, Hi-C and Manson. Ogilvie also recorded his own remix in sessions for the album, but did this not feature on the final track listing. All four versions have since leaked.

== Wyclef Jean remix ==
"Another One Bites The Dust (Wyclef Jean Remix)"

Single by Queen and Wyclef Jean featuring Pras and Free

from the album Small Soldiers soundtrack and Ghetto Supastar
- Released: 1998
- Length: 4:20
- Label: DreamWorks
- Songwriter: John Deacon
- Producers: Queen; Mack; Wyclef Jean; Jerry 'Wonder' Duplessis

Queen singles chronology
"No-One but You (Only the Good Die Young)" (1997)	"Another One Bites The Dust (Wyclef Jean Remix)" (1998)	"Under Pressure (Rah Mix)" (1999)

Wyclef Jean singles chronology
"Gunpowder" (1998)	"Another One Bites the Dust" (1998)	"In the Zone" (1999)

Pras Michel singles chronology
"What'cha Wanna Do" (1998)	"Another One Bites the Dust" (1998)	"Miss California" (2001)

In 1998, Haitian rapper Wyclef Jean covered and remixed the song alongside Queen for the film Small Soldiers. His version also features rap verses from Pras Michel and Free. The track also appears on Queen's compilation Greatest Hits III, and on Pras' debut album, Ghetto Supastar.

=== Background ===
The song enjoyed its greatest success in Queen's native United Kingdom, where it entered and peaked at number five on the UK Singles Chart, two places higher than the original, going on to spend six weeks on the chart. It also peaked within the top ten of the charts in Finland. It charted number 18, number 23, number 50 and number 62 in New Zealand, Austria, Sweden and France, respectively. The music video for this version was directed by Michel Gondry.

The song became Pras' third top ten hit in the United Kingdom from his debut solo album Ghetto Supastar, following the title track and follow-up single Blue Angels. However, Pras was not available for the filming of the video, and rapper Canibus recorded a new verse to take his place. This version was used only for the promotional video.

=== Track listing ===
- American CD single
1. "Another One Bites the Dust" (Radio Edit) – 4:00
2. "Another One Bites the Dust" (LP Version) – 4:20
3. "Another One Bites the Dust" (Instrumental) – 4:17
4. "Another One Bites the Dust" (Acappella) – 4:45
- UK CD single
1. "Another One Bites the Dust" (New LP Version) – 4:20
2. "Another One Bites the Dust" (Team 1 Black Rock Star Main Pass Mix) – 4:46
3. "Another One Bites the Dust" (Team 1 Black Rock Star Radio Edit) – 4:17
- German CD single
1. "Another One Bites the Dust" (Small Soldiers Remix) – 4:20
2. "Rock and Roll (Part 2) (Dutch Remix)" (instrumental) (performed by Gary Glitter) – 3:51
3. "Another One Bites the Dust" (Instrumental) – 4:17
- German CD single
1. "Another One Bites the Dust" (Radio Edit) – 4:00
2. "Another One Bites the Dust" (Instrumental) – 4:17

=== Weekly charts ===
Chart (1998–1999)	Peak position
Austria (Ö3 Austria Top 40)	23
Belgium (Ultratop 50 Flanders)	13
Belgium (Ultratop 50 Wallonia)	29
Canada Dance/Urban (RPM)	22
Finland (Suomen virallinen lista)	7
France (SNEP)	62
Germany (GfK)	46
Ireland (IRMA)	11
Netherlands (Dutch Top 40)	21
Netherlands (Single Top 100)	21
New Zealand (Recorded Music NZ)	9
Norway (VG-lista)	20
Sweden (Sverigetopplistan)	50
Switzerland (Schweizer Hitparade)	35
UK Singles (Official Charts)	5
US Hot R&B Airplay (Billboard)	69

== Queen vs. The Miami Project ==
"Another One Bites the Dust (Cedric Gervais & Second Sun Radio Edit)"

Single by Queen vs. The Miami Project

from the album Another One Bites the Dust (The Miami Project Remixes)
- B-side: "Another One Bites the Dust" (Original Version)
- Released: 2006
- Length: 3:22
- Label: Positiva
- Songwriter: John Deacon
- Producers: Queen; Mack; Cedric Gervais

Queen singles chronology
"Flash (Vanguard Mix)" (2003)	"Another One Bites the Dust (Cedric Gervais & Second Sun Radio Edit)" (2006)	"Bohemian Rhapsody (Muppets Version)" (2009)

The song was remixed again in 2006. The single reached the UK Top 40, peaking at number 31, credited to Queen vs The Miami Project. The lead remix was by Cedric Gervais & Second Sun for which a new video was filmed.

=== Track listing ===
- 7" picture disc vinyl
1. "Another One Bites the Dust" (Cedric Gervais & Second Sun Radio Edit)
2. "Another One Bites the Dust" (Original Version)
- CD single
1. "Another One Bites the Dust" (Cedric Gervais & Second Sun Radio Edit)
2. "Another One Bites the Dust" (Cedric Gervais & Second Sun Vocal Mix)
3. "Another One Bites the Dust" (Oliver Koletski Remix)
4. "Another One Bites the Dust" (A Skillz Remix)
5. "Another One Bites the Dust" (Soul Avengerz Remix)
6. "Another One Bites the Dust" (DJ Pedro & Oliver Berger)
7. "Another One Bites the Dust" (Cedric Gervais & Second Sun Radio Edit) (video)
- Digital download EP
1. "Another One Bites the Dust" (Cedric Gervais & Second Sun Radio Edit)
2. "Another One Bites the Dust" (Cedric Gervais & Second Sun Vocal Mix)
3. "Another One Bites the Dust" (Oliver Koletski Remix)
4. "Another One Bites the Dust" (A Skillz Remix)
5. "Another One Bites the Dust" (Soul Avengerz Remix)
6. "Another One Bites the Dust" (DJ Pedro & Oliver Berger)

=== Weekly charts ===
Chart (2006–2007)	Peak position
Denmark (Tracklisten)	13
Finland (Suomen virallinen lista)	3
Germany (GfK)	88
Netherlands (Dutch Top 40)	30
Netherlands (Single Top 100)	49
Portugal (AFP)	58
Spain (Promusicae)	9
UK Singles (Official Charts)	31

Chart (2018)	Position
Austria (Ö3 Austria Top 40)	72
Portugal (AFP)	58
Spain (Promusicae)	62
Switzerland (Schweizer Hitparade)	78

=== Year-end charts ===
Chart (2019)	Position
Portugal (AFP)	183

=== Certifications ===
Region	Certification	Certified units/sales
Italy (FIMI)	3× Platinum	210,000^{‡}
^{‡} Sales+streaming figures based on certification alone.

== Captain Jack version ==
"Another One Bites the Dust"

Single by Queen Dance Traxx featuring Captain Jack

from the album Queen Dance Traxx 1
- Released: 1996
- Length: 3:48
- Songwriter: John Deacon
- Producers: Udo Niebergall; Richard Witte

Captain Jack singles chronology
"Little Boy" (1996)	"Another One Bites the Dust" (1996)	"Together and Forever" (1997)

In 1996, Queen Dance Traxx and German Eurodance group Captain Jack covered the song for the album Queen Dance Traxx 1 and released it as a single. The song was produced by Udo Niebergall and Richard Witte, and reached number five in Finland and was a top-20 hit in the Netherlands. It also became a top-40 hit in Austria, a top-50 hit in Belgium and a top-70 hit in the band's native Germany. The accompanying music video for this version was directed by Rudi Dolezal and Hannes Rossacher, and was filmed in Berlin, Germany.

=== Track listing ===
1. "Another One Bites the Dust" (Radio Mix) – 3:48
2. "Another One Bites the Dust" (Club Mix) – 5:29

Remixed by Hal & Dj Ufuk a.k.a. Helmut Apel & Ufuk Yildirim

1. "Another One Bites the Dust" (DJs Extended Mix) – 6:23

=== Charts ===
Chart (1996–1997)	Peak position
Austria (Ö3 Austria Top 40)	33
Belgium (Ultratop 50 Flanders)	41
Europe (European Dance Radio)	22
Finland (Suomen virallinen lista)	5
Germany (GfK)	61
Netherlands (Dutch Top 40)	12
Netherlands (Single Top 100)	14

== Other versions ==
In 1980, "Weird Al" Yankovic recorded a parody of "Another One Bites the Dust" entitled "Another One Rides the Bus"; the narrator laments about a crowded public city bus. "Another One Rides the Bus" was performed by Yankovic on his first television appearance on The Tomorrow Show (21 April 1981) with Tom Snyder.

== See also ==
- List of Billboard Hot 100 number-one singles of 1980
- List of Cash Box Top 100 number-one singles of 1980
- List of number-one singles of 1980 (Canada)
- List of number-one singles of 1981 (Spain)
