= 53431 =

Greatest hits album by Swami
- Released: August 17, 2009
- Genre: Bhangra
- Label: DesiRock/Cigale (UK); EMI/Virgin (India)
- Producer: DJ Swami

Swami chronology
Equalize (2007)	53431 (2009)	Upgrade (2017)

Professional ratings
Review scores
Source	Rating
BBC Music	(no rating)

53431 is a Greatest Hits compilation by the electro-pop band Swami. The title refers to the numerical spelling of the band's name. This release is a milestone to mark 10 years of the band's existence, and contains the hits and most well known songs from the band's three studio albums, 1999's Desi Nu Skool Beatz, 2004's So Who Am I and 2007's Equalize.

It also contains two new songs "Sugarless" and "Tonight".

== Track listing ==
No.	Title	Writer(s)	Length
1.	"Electro Jugni"	Diamond Duggal, S-Endz	3:11
2.	"Sugarless"	Diamond Duggal, S-Endz, Liana McCarthy	4:06
3.	"DesiRock"	Diamond Duggal, S-Endz	4:03
4.	"Mehbooba"	Diamond Duggal, Simon Duggal, Tarsame Singh, Kam Bura	4:06
5.	"Turn It Up"	Diamond Duggal, S-Endz	3:51
6.	"Hey Hey"	Diamond Duggal, Domonique Greene, Juan F Peters	4:01
7.	"Tonight"	Diamond Duggal, S-Endz	4:22
8.	"Don't Hold Back"	Diamond Duggal, S-Endz	3:17
9.	"Shakedown"	Diamond Duggal, Aaefka C Macey	4:16
10.	"Homage"	Diamond Duggal, Simon Duggal	5:06
11.	"Ching"	Diamond Duggal, Spencer Graham	5:25
12.	"Disciples"	Diamond Duggal, Simon Duggal	4:20
13.	"Big Beat Thumbi"	Diamond Duggal, Simon Duggal	5:41
14.	"Ching" (Shiva Soundsystem's Mo-Flow Remix)		4:51
15.	"DesiRock" (Shiva Soundsystem's Radio Remix)		4:00

Digital-only Release
No.	Title	Length
16.	"Sugarless" (New Desi Generation Remix)	4:35
