= Do It Again (Swami song) =

Single by Swami

from the album Upgrade in Progress
- Released: 7 November 2014
- Recorded: 2010–2014
- Genre: Bhangra, electro
- Label: DesiRock Ent
- Songwriter(s): DJ Swami; S-Endz; Liana McCarthy; Supreet Suri; Arshad Khan
- Producer(s): DJ Swami

Swami singles chronology
"Back It Up" (2013)	"Do It Again" (2014)

"Do It Again" is the second single from Swami's forthcoming album, Upgrade in Progress. Written by Diamond Duggal, S-Endz, Liana McCarthy, Supreet Suri and Arshad Khan, it was released on 7 November 2014.

The song features vocals by band members S-Endz, Sups and Liana and was produced by DJ Swami. The song is a fusion of electro, bhangra and pop music.

== Music video ==
A video for this song was filmed in India in September 2014 and was released on 7 November 2014 along with the single.
