= Haven't Found =

Single by Pras Michel featuring Sharli McQueen

from the album Win, Lose or Draw
- Released: June 6, 2005
- Recorded: April 26, 2005
- Genre: Hip-hop
- Length: 3:35
- Label: Universal
- Songwriters: U2, Pras Michel
- Producer: Pras

Pras Michel featuring Sharli McQueen singles chronology
"Miss California" (2001)	"Haven't Found" (2005)	"Turn You On" (2007)

"Haven't Found" is a hip-hop song by Pras Michel, released as the first and only single from his second solo studio album, Win, Lose or Draw. The track features vocals from American singer Sharli McQueen. The single was released on June 6, 2005. The song is essentially a cover of U2's "I Still Haven't Found What I'm Looking For", from their album The Joshua Tree. The song was also included on the soundtrack to EA Sports' UEFA Euro 2012. The music video premiered in May 2005.

== Track listing ==
- UK CD1
1. "Haven't Found" (3:35)
2. "Dreamin'" (Euro Remix) (4:41)
- UK CD2
1. "Haven't Found" (3:35)
2. "Haven't Found" (Shake Ya Cookie Remix) (4:18)
3. "Light My Fire" (DJ Swami Remix) (5:57)
4. "Haven't Found" (Video) (3:35)
- Australian CD single
1. "Haven't Found" (3:35)
2. "Haven't Found" (Instrumental) (3:35)
3. "Win, Lose or Draw" (4:18)
4. "Haven't Found" (Video) (3:35)

== Charts ==
Chart performance for "Haven't Found"
Chart (2005)	Peak position
Australia (ARIA)	76
Belgium (Ultratip Bubbling Under Wallonia)	17
Finland (Suomen virallinen lista)	17
US CHR/Pop (Radio & Records)	36

== Release history ==
Release dates and formats for "Haven't Found"
Region	Date	Format	Label(s)	Ref.
United States	June 14, 2005	Mainstream airplay	Universal	
