= Michael Mind Project =

German duo

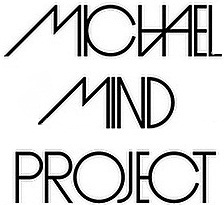
- Logo used since January 2013

Background information
- Also known as: Michael Mind (2007-2009)
- Origin: Aachen, Germany
- Genres: House, electro
- Years active: 2007–present
- Labels: Kontor, Spinnin' Records
- Members: Jens Kindervater; Frank Bülles

The Michael Mind Project (MMP) is a German house DJ and music production duo consisting of Jens Kindervater and Frank Bülles. Formed in 2007 under the name Michael Mind, it changed to its current name in 2009 to avoid confusion and emphasize the fictional nature of the name.

== Biography ==
In 2008, the Michael Mind Project released a track called "Show Me Love", a new version of the Robin S. hit.

== Discography ==
=== Albums ===
Year	Album	Peak chart positions				
Year	Album	GER	AUT	CH	FIN	FRA
2008	My Mind	—	—	—	—	—
2012	State of Mind	53	43	—	—	—
"—" denotes releases that did not chart

=== Singles ===
As Michael Mind

Year	Single	Peak chart positions					Album
Year	Single	GER	AUT	CH	FRA	FIN	Album
2007	"Blinded by the Light" (featuring Manfred Mann's Earth Band)	12	51	—	—	6	My Mind
2007	"Ride Like the Wind"	65	—	—	—	—	My Mind
2008	"Show Me Love"	38	53	58	17	—	My Mind
2009	"Baker Street"	76	69	—	—	—	My Mind
2009	"Love's Gonna Get You"	65	59	—	—	—	Singles only
2009	"Gotta Let You Go"	58	—	—	—	—	Singles only
"—" denotes releases that did not chart

As Michael Mind Project

Year	Single	Peak chart positions					Album
Year	Single	GER	AUT	CH	FRA	FIN	Album
2009	"How Does It Feel"	67	71	—	—	—	Singles only
2010	"Feel Your Body"	67	—	—	—	—	Singles only
2010	"Delirious" (featuring Mandy Ventrice & Carlprit)	—	—	—	—	—	State of Mind
2011	"Hook Her Up"	—	—	—	—	—	State of Mind
2011	"Ready or Not" (featuring Sean Kingston)	55	—	—	—	—	State of Mind
2011	"Rio De Janeiro" (featuring Bobby Anthony & Rosette)	56	—	—	98	—	State of Mind
2012	"Feeling So Blue" (featuring Dante Thomas)	38	20	40	128	—	State of Mind
2012	"Nothing Lasts Forever" (featuring Dante Thomas)	40	34	26	—	—	State of Mind
2012	"Antiheroes″	78	64	—	—	—	State of Mind
2013	″Unbreakable″	—	—	—	—	—	State of Mind
2013	″Razorblade″ (featuring Lisa Aberer)	—	—	—	—	—	State of Mind
2013	″One More Round″ (featuring TomE & Raghav)	80	53	40	—	—	Singles only
2014	″Ignite″	—	—	—	—	—	Singles only
"—" denotes releases that did not chart
