= Ghetto Supastar (album) =

Studio album by Pras
- Released: October 27, 1998
- Length: 73:57
- Labels: Ruffhouse; Columbia
- Producers: Pras Michel (exec.); Wyclef Jean (also exec.)

Pras chronology
Ghetto Supastar (1998)	Win Lose or Draw (2005)

Singles from Ghetto Supastar
- 1. "Avenues" Released: September 29, 1997; 2. "Ghetto Supastar" Released: June 6, 1998; 3. "Blue Angels" Released: September 28, 1998; 4. "What'cha Wanna Do" Released: January 1999

Ghetto Supastar is the debut solo studio album by former Fugees member and American rapper Pras. The album was released on October 27, 1998, through Ruffhouse Records and Columbia Records.

== Promotion ==
The album produced the single "Ghetto Supastar (That Is What You Are)," features a rap by Ol' Dirty Bastard and additional vocals by R&B singer Mýa. The song became a worldwide hit, and Pras' biggest hit to date as a solo artist, reaching number fifteen on the US Billboard Hot 100, and reaching number one in eight countries, as well as reaching the top five in five countries as well, including the United Kingdom. The song received a nomination for Best Rap Performance by a Duo or Group at the 41st Grammy Awards. Originally, "What'cha Wanna Do" was due to be released as the album's third single on September 28, 1998. However, at the last minute, it was replaced with "Blue Angels."

== Critical reception ==
Professional ratings
Review scores
Source	Rating
AllMusic	2.5/5 stars
Entertainment Weekly	B−
Robert Christgau	(dud)
Rolling Stone	3/5 stars

Entertainment Weekly's Tom Sinclair felt that although the album "sounds like he’s got one ear glued to the No Limit catalog and the other to Puff Daddy (”Blue Angels” samples the theme from Grease), Ghetto Supastar yields enough lowbrow kicks to keep hardcore heads bobbing until the next Fugees disc." Vibe concluded that "this crowd-pleasing approach just might confirm Pras as the ghetto superstar he doesn't know he already is." Anthony Decurtis, writing for Rolling Stone, wrote that "nothing else on Supastar réaches nearly as high as [its lead single] – in particular, the rapping by Pras and the usual array of guests rarely rises above (or, to be fair, below) mere adequacy. But the most intriguing aspect of the album is the way it continues the effort of the Fugees camp and Puff Daddy's family to establish the pop wing of hip-hop as the definitive mainstream music of our time – a form that can incorporate the most tamed and sanctioned aspects of our culture while maintaining an air of the forbidden."

AllMusic editor Bill Cassel rated the album two and a half stars out of five. He called Ghetto Supastar a "scattershot, throw-in-the-kitchen-sink approach. You get the single, 11 more songs, versions of "Hallelujah" and "Amazing Grace" and a whole bunch of Pras' answering machine messages. That said, Ghetto Supastar isn't half-bad [...] With a little editing, [it] could've been a killer; as is, it's an entertaining slice of R&B-oriented hip-hop." Chicago Tribune critic Soren Baker found that Pras was not "capable of carrying a full-length album [...] The Haitian native's debut solo album [...] is a messy attempt to ride the coattails of today's hottest hip-hop sounds. Jean's and Hill's albums demonstrated their creativity and musicianship, whereas Pras seems content mimicking other, more capable, rappers on his set. Although much of rap is built around reinterpreting someone else's work, Pras' results sound bland and forced."

== Chart performance ==
The album debuted at number fifty-five on the US Billboard 200 chart, and number thirty-five on the R&B/Hip-Hop Albums chart. By March 2005, Ghetto Supastar had sold 175,000 copies in the United States, according to Nielsen SoundScan.

== Track listing ==
Ghetto Supastar track listing
No.	Title	Writer(s)	Producer(s)	Length
1.	"Hallelujah"			1:30
2.	"Ghetto Supastar (That Is What You Are)" (featuring Ol' Dirty Bastard and Mýa)	Pras Michael; Russell Jones; Wyclef Jean; Barry Gibb; Maurice Gibb; Robin Gibb	Pras; Wyclef Jean; Jerry Duplessis^{[a]}; Che^{[a]}	4:21
3.	"1st Phone Interlude"			2:33
4.	"What'cha Wanna Do" (featuring Free and The Product G&B)	Michael; Jerry Duplessis; Marie Wright; David McRae; Marvin Moore-Hough	Pras; Duplessis; Matty Kats^{[a]}	4:11
5.	"Blue Angels" (featuring The Product G&B)	Michael; Duplessis; B. Gibb	Jean; Duplessis	4:13
6.	"Can't Stop the Shining (Rip Rock Pt. 2)" (featuring Canibus and Free)	Michael; Duplessis; Germaine Williams; Wright	Pras; Duplessis^{[a]}	4:15
7.	"Get Your Groove On" (featuring Philly's Most Wanted and The Product G&B)	Michael; Duplessis; Harry Wayne Casey; Richard Finch; Al Holly; Joel Witherspoon; McRae; Moor-Hough; Nasis Hurst	Pras; Duplessis^{[a]}	4:31
8.	"Frowsey (Pt. 2)"	Michael; Salaam Remi	Remi	3:12
9.	"Dirty Cash"	Michael	Pras	1:35
10.	"For The Love of This"	Michael	Pras; Soul Diggaz^{[a]}	4:07
11.	"Wha' What Wha' What" (featuring Philly's Most Wanted)	Michael; Holly; Witherspoon; Hurst	Pras; A Kid Called Roots^{[a]}	3:56
12.	"2nd Phone Interlude"			2:10
13.	"Lowriders" (featuring Philly's Most Wanted and The Product G&B)	Michael; Duplessis; Holly; Witherspoon; Hurst	Pras; Duplessis	4:12
14.	"Yeah 'Eh Yeah 'Eh" (featuring Mack 10 and Reptile)	Michael; Duplessis; Dedrick Rolison; Holking Brice; Joe Zawinul	Pras; Duplessis	3:49
15.	"Murder Dem"	Michael; Duplessis	Jean; Duplessis^{[a]}	4:22
16.	"3rd Phone Interlude"			3:52
17.	"Amazing Grace"	John Newton	Pras	5:02
18.	"Final Interlude"			3:29

UK bonus tracks
No.	Title	Writer(s)	Producer(s)	Length
19.	"Avenues" (Refugee Camp All-Stars featuring Pras and Ky-Mani)	Eddy Grant	Pras; Jean^{[a]}; Duplessis^{[a]}	4:19
20.	"Another One Bites the Dust" (Queen & Wyclef Jean featuring Pras and Free)	John Deacon	Queen; Jean; Duplessis^{[a]}	4:18

US deluxe edition – bonus disc
No.	Title	Writer(s)	Producer(s)	Length
1.	"What's Clef" (performed by Wyclef Jean)	Jean; Remi; Graham Lyle; Terry Britten	Queen; Jean; Duplessis^{[a]}	4:17
2.	"The Right One" (John Forté with Pras and Jeni Fujita)	Michael; Forté; Marvin Tarplin; Smokey Robinson	Forté	4:30
3.	"Another One Bites the Dust" (Queen & Wyclef Jean featuring Pras and Free)	Deacon	Queen; Jean; Duplessis^{[a]}	4:18
4.	"Here We Go" (Funkmaster Flex with Khadejia, The Product, Wyclef Jean and Pras)		Funkmaster Flex	4:01

Notes

- ^{^[a]} denotes co-producer(s)

Sample credits

- "Ghetto Supastar (That Is What You Are)" contains an interpolation from "Islands in the Stream" (1983).
- "Blue Angels" contains replayed elements from "Grease" (1978).
- "Get Your Groove On" contains replayed elements from "Rock Your Baby" (1974).
- "Yeah 'Eh Yeah 'Eh" contains replayed elements from "Birdland" (1977).
- "What's Clef" contains replayed elements from "What's Love Got to Do with It" (1984).

== Production credits ==
- Salaam Remi: Producer
- Warren Riker: Engineer, Mixing
- Ol' Dirty Bastard: Performer
- Mack 10: Performer
- Wyclef Jean: Guitar, Producer, Executive Producer
- Mýa: Performer
- Chris Theis Engineer, Mixing
- Davis Factor Photography
- Matty Kats: Production
- Canibus: Performer
- Pras: Producer, Executive Producer, Main Performer
- Lisa Michelle Stylist
- Jayson Dyer: Assistant Engineer
- Dawn Fitch: Digital Imaging
- Veronica Fletcher: Hair Stylist
- A Kid Called Roots: Producer
- Nancie Stern: Sample Clearance
- Mario DeArce: Engineer
- Free: Performer
- Che: Producer
- Will Quinnell: Mastering
- Rev. Richard White: Graphic Assistant
- Phil Blackman: Engineer
- Brain: Art Direction
- Lenny Kravitz: Guitar

== Charts ==
Chart performance for Ghetto Supastar
Chart (1998)	Peak position
Australian Albums (ARIA)	54
Canadian R&B Albums (Nielsen SoundScan)	7
Dutch Albums (Album Top 100)	95
Finnish Albums (Suomen virallinen lista)	31
French Albums (SNEP)	70
German Albums (Offizielle Top 100)	68
New Zealand Albums (RMNZ)	34
Norwegian Albums (VG-lista)	9
Scottish Albums (Official Charts)	85
Swedish Albums (Sverigetopplistan)	19
Swiss Albums (Schweizer Hitparade)	47
UK Albums (Official Charts)	44
UK R&B Albums (Official Charts)	3
US Billboard 200	55
US Top R&B/Hip-Hop Albums (Billboard)	35
