= A. J. Calloway =

American entertainment reporter (born 1974)

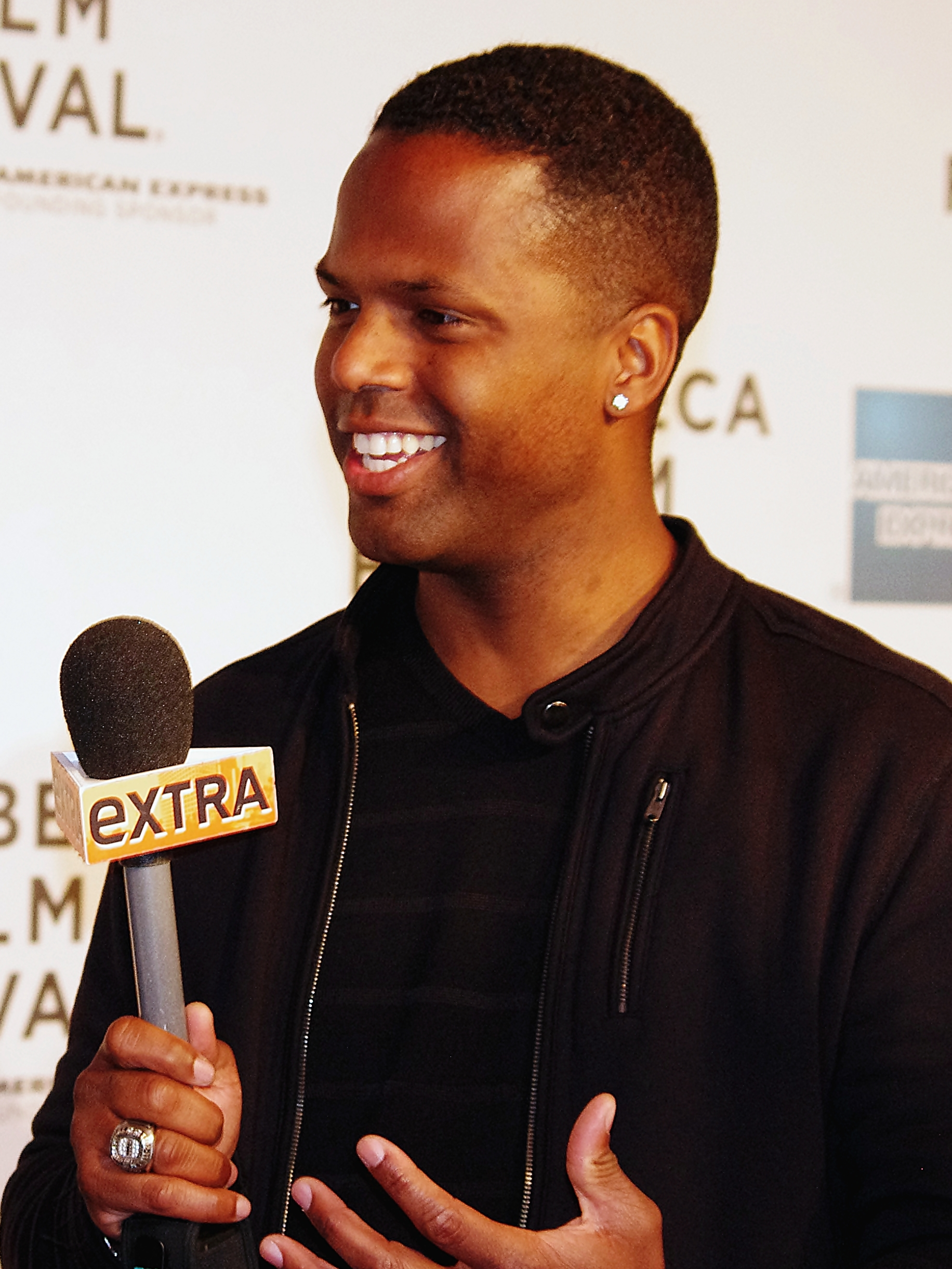
- Calloway at the 2012 Tribeca Film Festival premiere of Knife Fight
- Born: Albert Johnson Calloway; August 29, 1974 (age 52)
- Occupation: Entertainment reporter
- Years active: 2000–present
- Spouses: Lao Sealey (m. 2005; div. 2007) Dionne Walker (m. 2013)
- Children: 3

Albert Johnson "A. J." Calloway (born August 29, 1974) is an American entertainment reporter. He is known as the original host on 106 & Park, which originally aired on BET. After co-hosting the show for five years with Free (Marie Wright), Calloway left the show on July 28, 2005. He came back to host the last episode of 106 & Park on December 19, 2014 with Bow Wow, Free, Rocsi and Terrence J.

== Career ==
Calloway then moved to Co-Host on the entertainment news program Extra from 2005 until February 2019. That February he was suspended while being investigated for sexual misconduct. In July he was terminated when the show's producer Telepictures terminated him, due to the number of sexual assault allegations.

== Personal ==
He is an alumnus of Saint Benedict's Prep in Newark, New Jersey and Howard University in Washington, D.C.

He was married to pediatrician Dr. Lao Sealey from April 23, 2005-2007.

On June 8, 2013, he married Dionne Walker. Together, they have three children: Amy Belle (August 12, 2013), Ava Claire (January 2015), and Albert III (March 2017).
