= Blue Angels (song) =

Single by Pras Michel featuring The Product G&B

from the album Ghetto Supastar
- Released: September 28, 1998
- Recorded: 1998
- Genre: Hip-hop
- Length: 4:18
- Label: Columbia Records
- Songwriter: Pras Michel
- Producer: Pras

Pras Michel featuring The Product G&B singles chronology
"Ghetto Supastar (That Is What You Are)" (1998)	"Blue Angels" (1998)	"What'cha Wanna Do" (1998)

"Blue Angels" is a hip-hop song by Pras Michel, released as the third single from his debut solo studio album, Ghetto Supastar. The track features vocals from American group the Product G&B. The single was released on September 28, 1998, as a last minute replacement for What'cha Wanna Do, which was removed from shelves just days before its release. The track samples the theme song "Grease" by Frankie Valli. "Blue Angels" was a commercial success in the United Kingdom, where it reached the top ten.

The accompanying music video (directed by Antoine Fuqua) features Pras on a submarine that is about to crash. His mission to save the crew members is thwarted when the ship implodes, causing everyone but Pras to die, as he manages to escape by jumping over the side of the ship.

== Track listing ==
- UK CD1
1. "Blue Angels" (4:18)
2. "Blue Angels" (K Gee Remix) (5:57)
3. "Blue Angels" (Seani B Remix) (6:13)
- UK CD2
1. "Blue Angels" (4:18)
2. "Ghetto Supastar" (The Black Apple Remix) (5:03)
3. "Murder Dem" (3:52)

== Charts ==
=== Weekly charts ===
Chart (1998)	Peak position
Australia (ARIA)	55
Belgium (Ultratip Bubbling Under Flanders)	9
Germany (GfK)	75
Ireland (IRMA)	27
Netherlands (Dutch Top 40 Tipparade)	10
Netherlands (Single Top 100)	92
New Zealand (Recorded Music NZ)	10
Scottish Singles Sales (Official Charts)	19
Sweden (Sverigetopplistan)	10
Switzerland (Schweizer Hitparade)	50
UK Singles (Official Charts)	6
UK Hip Hop/R&B (Official Charts)	1

=== Year-end charts ===
Chart (1998)	Position
Sweden (Hitlistan)	69
UK Singles (OCC)	143
