= Outer Space (EP) =

EP by S-Endz
- Released: October 21, 2009
- Genre: Hip hop, pop, neofunk
- Length: 11:31
- Label: Neofunk Entertainment
- Producer: S-Endz

S-Endz chronology
Outer Space (2009)	Emanate (2010)

Outer Space is an EP album by the British-Asian music producer and vocalist S-Endz, who is well known as a member of the band Swami. The song Outer Space itself also features vocals from Kazz Kumar and Rukas.

== Information ==
S-Endz had originally been set to release his first solo album Emanate in the fall of 2009. However, it was pushed back to 2010 and the release of Outer Space was announced shortly thereafter. Centering on a mid-tempo, futuristic hip-hop groove, the song features both rapped and sung vocals from S-Endz, a further rap verse from Rukas, and a chorus sung by Kazz Kumar.

In an article published on leading Indian entertainment website DesiHits.com, S-Endz spoke about the collaboration and release:

"I first met Kazz a few years back. Our respective bands, Swami and Sona Family, had been booked by the same event promoters a few times, and supported by the same media outlets, so it was inevitable that our paths would cross sooner or later. When we met we seemed to be on the same wavelength as far as our love for music and constantly redefining looks and styles. Since then, we talked a few times and discussed the idea of collaboration but I didn't want to force the creation of it, because that's not how either of us operates. When I wrote "Outer Space" I knew it was perfect and that Kazz would sound great on it."

"I've known Rukas for a few years through mutual friends and associates of the late great Tupac Shakur. He has a gritty raw rap style that brings a different edge to the track."

The EP was released through the website Bandcamp.com - a platform allowing independent musicians to release their music for variable costs. Outer Space was released as a free download but with the option for fans to pay any amount they choose, if they choose to.

== Reviews ==
Professional ratings
Review scores
Source	Rating
TheMusictionary.com	7/10 stars

Reviews of the release were favorable, with leading Indian entertainment website DesiHits.com stating that "Unlike anything on the scene right now, Outer Space is truly a one of a kind track". Steven Anthony of The Musictionary gave the release a score of 7/10, stating that it "sounds incredibly fresh...like a cross between Trent Reznor and Kanye West, a sound that S-Endz has coined “Neofunk.” It’s different for sure, but more importantly it works and sounds like nothing you’ve heard before".

== Track listing ==
All tracks are written by S-Endz unless noted otherwise.

No.	Title	Length
1.	"Outer Space (featuring Kazz Kumar and Rukas)"	3:32
2.	"Outer Space (S-Endz's Industrofunk Remix)"	3:59
3.	"Electric Man"	4:00

== Album personnel ==
- S-Endz – writing, performance, production, all instruments, mixing, mastering
- Simon "Subs" Duggal – mixing and mastering on Track #1
- Rukas – writing, performance on Track #1 and Track #2
- Kazz Kumar – performance on Tracks #1 and #2
