= Jennifer Milan =

Italian R&B and Pop singer (born 1987)

- Born: Jennifer Milan; 22 September 1987 (age 38)
- Origin: Milan, Italy
- Genres: R&B, Pop, Soul
- Years active: 2008–present
- Label: Zimbalam
- Website: www.jennifermilan.net

Jennifer Milan (born 22 September 1987 in Milan, Italy) is an Italian R&B and Pop singer.

== Career ==
In 2008 Jennifer took part at the Italian talent show Amici di Maria De Filippi. She has been compared to Beyoncé and Joss Stone.

On 11 June 2009 was released in the United States and in Europe her first single "I Go To Go", written by Wayne Hector. The single "Watch Out" was included on the soundtrack of the movie Genitori & Figli-Agitare Bene Prima Dell'Uso, by Giovanni Veronesi, released at the cinema on 26 February 2010. On 2 March 2010 her first album, 22, was released. From the album was also released "Sos" as third single along with a videoclip. In 2011 she started working on a new album in Los Angeles. On 8 August 2013 she released a new single "Dance Floor"

== Discography ==
=== Albums ===
- 2010 – 22

=== Singles ===
- 2009 – Beside Me (#15 Italian FIMI Singles Chart)
- 2009 – I Got To Go
- 2010 – Watch Out (feat. Pras Michel)
- 2010 – SoS
- 2013 – Dance Floor

== Videography ==
- 2009 – I Go To Go
- 2010 – SoS
