= Jens Kindervater =

German disc jockey (born 1974)

- Born: July 13, 1974 (age 51); Aachen
- Origin: Germany
- Genres: House, Eurodance
- Occupations: DJ, producer
- Instrument: Turntables
- Years active: 1990s–present
- Label: Kontor
- Website: jens-kindervater.de

Jens Kindervater (born July 13, 1974) is a German electronic dance music DJ and producer. He is particularly known for the "Michael Mind Project", which he founded together with Francois Sanders in 2007 as "Michael Mind" and renamed in 2010.

== Life ==
Jens Kindervater was born July 13, 1974, in Aachen, where he grew up. He attended the Anne Frank High School in Aachen, graduating in 1994. He then began studying mechanical engineering, but broke it off due to his love of music.

With his later studio partner Bernd Johnen, he established contacts with Alphabet City Musikproduktions- und Verlags GmbH in Mönchengladbach and released his first recordings after one year.

In the mid-1990s, Kindervater moved to Belgium, where he was active in trance and techno music. There he played in many well-known clubs and participated in numerous competitions. He later decided to start a career as a solo artist and was accepted by the German record label Kontor Records. He has been living in Aachen again since 2014.

== Music career – solo and various projects ==
Despite influences from house music and dance-pop, Kindervater is still active in the area of hands-up and techno music. He is the founder and owner of the record labels Kick Fresh Recordings and Yawa Recordings, the latter in which he released his solo singles.

As a solo artist, he originally released his singles under the pseudonyms "Big Bass Inc." and "DJ Jens". Later, he is only active as "Kindervater". New solo singles with artists like Mandy Ventrice or J-Son were released. He is also a popular songwriter, composer, producer and remixer. He writes for DJ Antoine, Carlprit and Cascada among others. He also often represents the Michael Mind Project alone in live performances.

Kindervater has been working with DJ and producer Bernd Johnen for many years. Together they started with different music projects that vary in different genres. Some of them are still active today. However, he now mainly focuses on the Michael Mind Project together with Frank Bülles.

He is also a member of several music projects alongside the Michael Mind Project. With several chart successes, the "4 Clubbers", "Dance United" and "The Real Booty Babes" are his most successful projects. He left the "Dance United", which consists of several German DJs and donates the proceeds to charity. He is or was a member of the following projects and music groups:

- 2 Vibez
- 4 Clubbers
- Club Suite
- Da Franco
- Da Loop Brothers
- Dance United
- Delaforce
- Diego
- Dub Files
- Eric Von Heinecken
- The Game
- The Gatekeepers
- Groove Gangstaz
- Groovelikers
- Junkfood Junkies
- One 2 One
- The Real Booty Babes
- Stereoboys
- Summer Spirit
- Warp Six

== Success with Francois Sanders ==
=== 2007: Foundation of Michael Mind ===
Together with DJ and producer Francois Sanders, he founded the project Michael Mind in 2007.

They started their careers by covering the Manfred Mann's Earth Band classic Blinded by the Light in a dance version. Due to the success of the Disco Boys with another hit by the Manfred Mann's Earth Band, "For You", the idea was not implemented. But after the positive response from the producer team "Sunloverz" (Frank Bülles and Bernd Johnen) the track was finally produced. Blinded by the Light was able to maintain number 1 on the dance charts for several weeks and also reached the top 20 of the German single charts and number 51 in Austria.

Shortly afterwards, in October they released their debut album. It bears the title My Mind and contains a few original compositions and cover versions in addition to all previously released titles, but the album was unable to achieve chart placement and was, therefore, less popular.

On August 28, 2009, the last single was released as "Michael Mind", "Gotta Let You Go". This title is again a cover version. The original comes from Dominica and was first released in 1994. This song could only be placed in the German charts. The rapper Old Silverback took part in this song, and he still takes over the rap parts of many of the songs.

=== 2010: Renaming to Michael Mind Project ===
For the release of the single "How Does It Feel" in 2009, "Michael Mind" was renamed to "Michael Mind Project". With the addition "Project" the fantasy name should be emphasized, because due to the similarity of a solo project pseudonym and the few appearances of Frank Bülles, on CD covers and appearances, it was assumed that Michael Mind is a solo project. Since then, they have been publishing under this pseudonym. "How Does It Feel" was released on November 27, 2009, and was the first harbinger of the 2013 album State of Mind. The single initially stayed in the German single charts for three weeks, but rose again in 2010. Its top position was rank 67. The next single "Feel Your Body" was also a hit.

With "Feeling So Blue", the duo celebrated their first chart success in Switzerland, as well as with their next success single "Nothing Lasts Forever". Both tracks and the album track "Last Night"' were recorded in collaboration with the American singer Dante Thomas. Another big leap in the duo's career was working with world stars like Sean Kingston or Jason Derulo.

The duo's first joint album State of Mind was released on January 4, 2013. In contrast to My Mind, this studio album was a great success. The album rose to the top 100 in Germany and Austria just a week after its release. It contains many 2013 versions of old hits from the Michael Mind period and many original compositions.

The duo's latest Michael Mind Project track is the title "One More Round", which was released on June 28, 2013. It was recorded in collaboration with rapper TomE, best known for DJ Antoine's single "Bella Vita", and Canadian singer Raghav, who is known for singles like "So Confused" or "Angel Eyes". It will be the first single that is not on the State of Mind album.

== Discography ==
=== Compilation albums ===
Year	Title	Notes
2011	Best Of	Initial release: March 25, 2011 (Label: Yawa Recordings)

=== EP's ===
Year	Title	Notes
1998	E.P.	Initial release: January 1, 1998 (as DJ Jens)

=== Singles ===
Year	Title Album	Notes
2004	{{Cite FTP |url=ftp://013.07.974 |server=013.07.974 |url-status=dead |title=FTP link }}	Initial release: September 7, 2004 (as Kindervater)
2005	Sternenweg 5	Initial release: July 8, 2005 (as Kindervater)
2007	Forever; Forever – The Album	Initial release: May 18, 2007 (as Kindervater feat. Nadja)
2008	Everytime You Need Me; Forever – The Album	Initial release: February 8, 2008 (as Kindervater feat. Nadja)
2008	Ordinary World; Forever – The Album	Initial release: April 14, 2008 (as Kindervater)
2008	Work that Body	Initial release: December 5, 2008 (as Big Bass Inc.)
2009	Hit the Floor	Initial release: May 29, 2009 (as Big Bass Inc.)
2009	Alone in the Darkness; Forever – The Album	Initial release: June 8, 2009 (as Kindervater)
2009	Driving Place	Initial release: August 28, 2009 (as Big Bass Inc.)
2010	Lovephobia; Forever – The Album	Initial release: September 2, 2010 (as Kindervater feat. Mandy Ventrice)
2011	Don't Stop	Initial release: December 9, 2011 (as Kindervater feat. Julia Goldstern)
2012	Spotlight	Initial release: May 4, 2012 (as Kindervater feat. J-Son)
2012	Shooting Stars	Initial release: October 19, 2012 (as Kindervater feat. Michelle Leonard)
2012	Heartbeat	Initial release: December 21, 2012 (as Kindervater feat. Ronja Gullichsen)

=== Remixes (selection) ===
Year	Title	Original artist
1997	Love Song The Rebirth	Spanish Fly
1999	Killerbeat	Tank
2000	Die Herdplatte 2000°	Gary D.
2000	Push	Gardeweg
2001	Don't Let Me Down	Mabel
2001	Arma La Vida	Dave Soerensen
2002	Save Me	Kyau vs. Albert
2002	Everybody	Rocco
2003	Rock Da Place	Final Excess
2003	Habibi	El Samah
2004	Endless	Ron Van Den Beuken
2005	The Weekend	Michael Gray
2005	Endless	Ron van den Beuken
2005	Supermind	Dynamik Freaks
2007	Keep on Rising	Ultra DJ's
2007	Komodo	Comiccon
2008	September	Can't Get Over
2008	Raindrops (Encore une fois)	Sash!
2008	Try And Try	4 Clubbers
2009	Rhythm Is a Dancer 2009	Snap!
2009	Don't Walk Away	Jenny Jones
2009	Holiday	Dizzee Rascal
2010	Like A Lady	Monrose
2010	I Need You Now	Agnes
