= Diamond Duggal =

British-Indian music producer

- Diamond Duggal

Background information
- Also known as: DJ Swami
- Origin: Birmingham, England
- Genres: Electronic, pop, hip hop, bhangra, world
- Occupations: Record Producer, Composer, Creative Director
- Years active: 1990–present
- Labels: DesiRock Entertainment, Virgin EMI, Sony Music
- Website: Diamond Duggal DJ Swami

Diamond Duggal also known as DJ Swami is a British-Indian music producer, composer and creative director whose work spans recorded music, film and television, live performance and emerging creative technologies. He has produced a diversity of notable artists, including Shania Twain, Pras Michel, Apache Indian, Maxi Priest, Stereo Nation, Zoheb Hassan and Viktor Kiraly as well as remixing for artists including Erasure, the Beat and Nusrat Fateh Ali Khan. He is an accomplished guitar player and multi-instrumentalist (modular synthesizers, keyboards, bass, drums, DJing) and toured as lead guitarist with Boyzone and Robbie Williams. Diamond is also kniown as co-founder of established production duo Simon and Diamond. As DJ Swami, he performs and records electronic, Indian Punjabi bhangra and South Asian music both as a solo artist and as band leader of UK electronic world music act Swami. He has also toured internationally as Music Director/ Creative Director for PunjabTronix, an immersive live collaboration of culture and technology. DJ Swami also tours and performs in collaboration with Deep Forest.

Diamond received an Ivor Novello Awards songwriter nomination for the song Arranged Marriage and his songwriting and production contributed to the Mercury Prize nomination for the album No Reservations by Apache Indian. Diamond also produced with mentor Mutt Lange the Shania Twain double Grammy Award-nominated album Up!

As DJ Swami, he has won Best Producer 2005 and Best Producer 2008 at the UK Asian Music Awards. He also won the award for Best Mixed Album at the South African Music Awards 2010.

His most successful solo Swami album to date was 2004's DesiRock, the title track from which has been used in a variety of films, TV shows and video games.

Diamond is founder of record label, production and sync licensing company DesiRock Entertainment where recent projects include film and TV sync licensing notably Netflix hit series Indian Matchmaking, artist development, international collaborations and AI music research and VR immersive experiences including the DJ Swami in the Studio AI/ VR music showcase with VR social platform Driftspace.

== Biography ==
Born Diamond Jyoti Duggal, he grew up in the Handsworth district of Birmingham, England in a melting pot of second-generation Indian and Jamaican multi-culturalism. By the age of 12, he was already playing guitar in local reggae and rock bands. While learning the craft of music through listening to records by Jimi Hendrix, Ravi Shankar, Kraftwerk, Laxmikant Pyarelal and local Birmingham artists Steel Pulse and UB40, Diamond witnessed his first glance of a new musical hybrid and what was ultimately to become his life's passion.

In 1991, as production duo Simon and Diamond, the brothers launched the groundbreaking production fusion sound of dancehall reggae and bhangra with the artist Apache Indian. The project received huge public and media interest due to its cultural diversity and was making huge waves in the UK, USA, Canada and India. This marked a new milestone in British Asian popular music, soon followed by a record deal with Island Records and a publishing deal with Sony Music in 1992. The Apache Indian debut album 'No Reservations' became a huge international success.

In 1997, Diamond started the group Swami with drummer and brother Simon, vocalist Taz Singh and Indian percussionist Kam Bura. The band performed a number of local and European shows before releasing their debut album Desi Nu Skool Beatz on their SubDub Records label in 1999. The album was given an international release in 2000 on Nation Records (Beggars Banquet). The guitar surfing electronic title track "Mehbooba" went on to feature in the Olsen Twins Warner Brothers movie New York Minute (2003).

Diamond took to the studio in 2002 to work with Shania Twain on her follow-up album to Come On Over entitled Up!. The album was produced by a totally international team co-ordinated between producer Mutt Lange, Simon and Diamond. Shania Twain's Up! topped the American Billboard for six weeks in late 2002 with multi-platinum sales exceeding 15 million and received two Grammy nominations in 2004.

Swami's follow-up album was So Who Am I on SonyBMG in 2005. The title track "DesiRock" embraced clubs the world over with DJ Swami's unique left field electronic beats and anthemic bhangra melodies and reached even wider audiences in the EA Games FIFA World Cup 2006 video game as well as the UK movie Mischief Night (2006).

In 2005, Diamond won "Best Producer" at the UK Asian Music Awards.

In June 2007, Diamond (as DJ Swami) was listed in the official Guardian Glastonbury Festival Guide as one of the Top 5 acts to see at Glastonbury 2007 alongside Amy Winehouse and the Arctic Monkeys. The performance was highlighted by the BBC Asian Network.

In January 2008, Swami's album Equalize was voted album of the year by DesiHits.com. The album features mainstream collaborations from the US, South Africa, France, England and India.

In March 2008, as DJ Swami, he won "Best Producer" at the UK Asian Music Awards for a second time.

In August 2008, Swami's "Hey Hey" music video received its Canadian premiere at Toronto's FILMI South Asian Film Festival.

In April 2010, Diamond won SAMA Best Mix Engineer at the South Africa Music Awards.

In 2013, Diamond produced the single "Fire" for artist Viktor Kiraly reaching the number 1 chart position in Hungary's MAHASZ Top 40.

In 2014, Diamond produced the second single "Running Out Of Time" for Viktor Kiraly featuring Run DMC reaching the number 1 chart position in Hungary's VIVA chart.

In 2015, Diamond completed production for Zoheb Hassan's album, Signature, featuring the vocals of his sister Nazia Hassan. Swami also released two new albums, Upgrade and Sidetrkd (a mostly instrumental version of Upgrade) in 2017.

In 2017, DJ Swami produced and toured the UK with new electronic meets Punjabi folk project PunjabTronix, as part of the ReImagine India cultural exchange programme.

In 2019, DJ Swami and Casey Rain commenced a weekly brand new radio show entitled 'The Phaseshift' on Dash Radio and Rukus Avenue Radio.

In 2021, Diamond was commissioned by Arts Council England to explore 'New Realities in Music' AI generative music research and VR immersive experiences, resulting in the DJ Swami in the Studio AI/ VR music showcase with VR social platform Driftspace.

From 2022 onwards, Diamond's work increasingly focused on the intersection of music, artificial intelligence, and cultural technology, alongside continued songwriting and production. Between 2023 and 2025, he participated in multiple editions of the AI Song Contest, an international initiative examining collaboration between human creators and artificial intelligence in music composition. Submitting work under his artist identity DJ Swami, his entries formed part of a wider body of experimental electronic music exploring AI as a creative tool rather than a replacement for human authorship.

Alongside his creative output, Duggal became increasingly active in industry discussion around artificial intelligence, music rights, and cultural diversity. He participated in and moderated panels at LA Sync Mission, a UK-led international programme connecting music creators and rights-holders with the US film and television industry. These sessions included AI-focused discussions held at EastWest Studios in Los Angeles, addressing topics such as authorship, cultural representation, and the future of music licensing.

During 2024 and 2025, Duggal continued to develop AI-driven creative projects combining music, visual media, and virtual performance, while maintaining his role as founder and creative director of SUPRODA, a creative studio exploring AI-driven virtual artists, immersive visual storytelling, and culturally led digital entertainment projects.

== Other notable work ==
As a writer, Diamond reviewed Sarfraz Manzoor's Greetings From Bury Park for The Guardian. The book was later adapted into the film, Blinded by the Light.

== Production discography ==
=== 2022 ===
- Unnati, DJ Swami – "Aaj Khojaey/ Rise In Love" (single/ Indigo World Records)
- J9 – "Tomari DJ Swami Remix" (EP/ J9 Music)

=== 2021 ===
- DJ Swami, Unnati, Lanja Ali, Amrit Kaur Lohia – "Saainyaan" (single/ DesiRock Ent.)
- DJ Swami – "Bazooka feat. Simran" (single/ DesiRock Ent.)

=== 2020 ===
- DJ Swami – "Hybrids 3" (EP/ DesiRock Ent.)
- DJ Swami – "Hybrids 4" (EP/ DesiRock Ent.)
- DJ Swami – "Danga feat. Simran" (single/ DesiRock Ent.)

=== 2019 ===
- DJ Swami – "Hybrids" (EP/ DesiRock Ent.)
- DJ Swami – "Hybrids 2" (EP/ DesiRock Ent.)
- DJ Swami – "8020" (EP/ DesiRock Ent.)
- DJ Swami – "PunjabTronix Remixes" (EP/ DesiRock Ent.)

=== 2018 ===
- PunjabTronix – "PunjabTronix" (EP/ Asian Arts Agency)

=== 2017 ===
- Swami – "UPGRADE" (album)
- Swami – "SIDETRKD" (album)

=== 2016 ===
- Unnati - "Teri Yaad Aati Hain" (Buddha Bar Ultimate Experience)

=== 2015 ===
- Swami – "We Are" (single)
- Viktor Kiraly – "Exhale" (single)
- Zoheb Hassan – "Always on My Mind" (single)
- Meja – "Yellow Ribbon" (remix)

=== 2014 ===
- Swami – "Do It Again" (single)
- Viktor Kiraly – "Running Out of Time" (single)
- Viktor Kiraly – "Work" (album track)
- Zoheb Hassan – "Signature" (album)

=== 2013 ===
- Swami – "Back It Up" (single)
- Viktor Kiraly – "Fire" (single)
- Pop Chaot – album tracks

=== 2012 ===
- Fell On Deaf Ears – Are You Getting Enough? (album mixing)
- Swami – Upgrade (album mixing)

=== 2011 ===
- Swami – Upgrade (album recording)
- Deep Forest – "Deep Swami" recording/ remixes

=== 2010 ===
- Meja – "Chasing Butterflies" (remix/ Sony)
- Delhi 2 Dublin – Planet Electric (album mixing)

=== 2009 ===
- Swami – Electro Jugni/She’s Mine EP
- Swami – 53431 (album/ EMI Virgin)
- Swami – "Sugarless" (single and remix)
- Ishmael – On the Edge (album/ Ghetto Ruff)
- Meja – "Regrets" (remix/ Sony)

=== 2008 ===
- Tigerstyle – "Balle Shava" (remix)
- Delhi 2 Dublin – "Dil Nachde" (remix)

=== 2007 ===
- Swami – Equalize (album/ EMI Virgin)

=== 2005 ===
- Swami – So Who Am I (album/ Sony BMG)
- Apache Indian – Time for Change (album/ Revolver)

=== 2004 ===
- Pras – "Light My Fire" (remix)
- Swami – DesiRock (album)

=== 2002 ===
- Shania Twain – Up! (album/ Mercury)
- Swami – BhangraDotCom (album/ Nation Records)
- DJ Swami - Pure Garage Volume 4 (album/ Roma II)

=== 2000/2001 ===
- Nusrat Fateh Ali Khan – Redefined (remix album/ OSA)
- DJ Swami - Pure Garage Volume 2 (album/ Roma II)
- DJ Swami - Sub Culture Vol. 2 (album/ Roma II)

=== 1999 ===
- Swami – Desi Nu Skool Beatz (album/ Nation Records)
- Swami – Turntablism (album/ Envy Entertainment Ltd)
- Swami – "Transmission" (single)
- Taz – Nasha (album/ SubDub)
- DJ Swami - Sub Culture Vol. 1 (album/ SubDub)

=== 1997/1998 ===
- Stereo Nation – "I’ve Been Waiting" (single)
- Stereo Nation – Jambo (album)

=== 1994/1995 ===
- Erasure – "Run to the Sun" (remix/ Mute)
- The Beat – "Mirror in the Bathroom" (remix/ London Records)
- Raise – "I Got It" (single and remix/ SubDub)

=== 1992/1993 ===
- Apache Indian – No Reservations (album/ Island Records)
- Apache Indian – "Arranged Marriage" (single and remix/ Island Records)
- Apache Indian – "Chok There" (single and remix/ Island Records)
- Louie Rankin – "Typewriter" (remix/ Ruffness)
- Johnny Zee – "Cum Be My Lover" (remix)
- Dillinger – "Cokane in My Brain" (remix/ Island Records)

=== 1991 ===
- The Badman – "Magic Style/Shape Dancing" (single and remix/ CityBeat)
- The Badman Presents N.D.X. – "Come With Me/Higher than Heaven" (single and remix/ CityBeat)
- Aretha Daye – "No More (Making Love)" (single)

=== 1990 ===
- Doggy – "Psyche" (single/ Rham Records)
- Demonik – "Labyrinthe" (single/ Rham Records)
