= Equalize =

Studio album by Swami
- Released: 24 September 2007 (UK); 24 December 2007 (India)
- Recorded: 2006–2007
- Genres: Pop, hip hop, bhangra
- Labels: DesiRock/Cigale (UK); EMI/Virgin (India)
- Producer: DJ Swami

Swami chronology
So Who Am I (2005)	Equalize (2007)	53431 (2009)

Professional ratings
Review scores
Source	Rating
SimplyBhangra.net	link
BBC Music	(not rated) link
Asian Woman Magazine	link

Equalize is the third album by the UK band Swami, released on 24 September 2007.

== Track listing ==
As given by the BBC.

1. "Hey Hey" (featuring Boostylz)
2. "Electro Jugni"
3. "Intoxicated" (featuring Lady Ru)
4. "Ching" (featuring Spee)
5. "Pushin'" (featuring Pras Michel and Ishmael)
6. "Shakedown" (featuring El Feco)
7. "Break" (featuring Ishmael)
8. "Can't Let Go" (featuring Errol Reid and Yam Boy)
9. "Give It What U Got" (featuring A Suivre)
10. "In Your Eyes" (featuring Sonia Panesar)

== Reviews ==
- Review by BBC Radio 1 DJ Bobby Friction
- Review by BBC Radio 1 DJ Nihal
- BBC Music Review
- Asian Woman Magazine Review
