= Dante Thomas =

American R&B singer and music (born 1978)

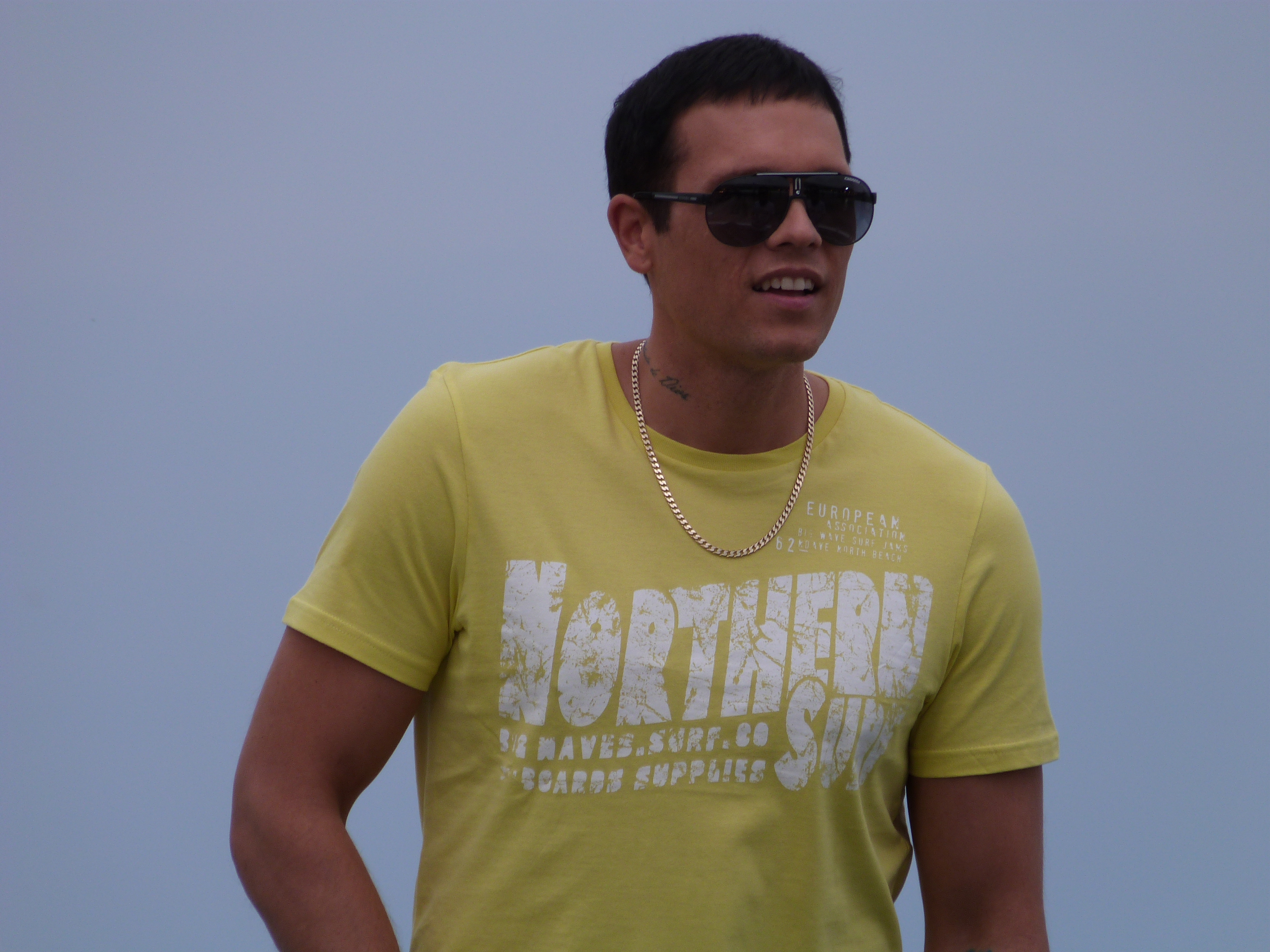
- Dante Thomas in 2012

Background information
- Born: January 7, 1978 (age 48); Salt Lake City, Utah, United States
- Occupation: Singer
- Instrument: Vocals
- Years active: 2000–present

Dante Thomas (born January 7, 1978) is an American R&B singer and musician, who experienced international success in 2001 with his song, "Miss California". He has lived in Germany since 2011, first in Hamburg, and since 2014 in the state of Saarland.

== Musical career ==
He was discovered by Donovan Thomas and Doug E. Fresh.

His debut album Fly contained his definitive international hit "Miss California" which topped the charts in Denmark and Germany and was a major hit in Austria, Belgium, France, Netherlands, Norway, Australia and New Zealand. It also reached number 25 in the United Kingdom and number 85 in the US on the Billboard Hot 100.

In 2012, he released his album Hardcore on Videotape and has an international single hit "Feeling So Blue" with Michael Mind Project, being a retake on Eiffel 65 1999 hit "Blue (Da Ba Dee)". The single "Feeling So Blue" has charted in Austria, France, Germany and Switzerland.

As of September 1, 2026, Dante Thomas has been the official singer and rapper of the Eurodance group C-Block

== Discography ==
=== Albums ===
List of albums, with selected chart positions
Title	Year	Peak chart positions	
Title	Year	FRA	SWI
Fly	2001	6	17
Hardcore on Videotape	2012	—	—

=== Singles ===
List of singles, with selected chart positions and certifications
Title	Year	Peak chart positions										Certifications	Album
Title	Year	AUS	AUT	BEL (Wa)	FRA	GER	ITA	NLD	SWE	SWI	US	Certifications	Album
"Miss California" (featuring Pras)	2001	5	4	2	3	1	20	1	6	2	85	ARIA: Gold; BVMI: Gold; GLF: Gold; IFPI SWI: Gold; SNEP: Gold	Fly
"Fly" (featuring C Langlais)	2001	—	—	—	65	57	—	—	—	—	—		Fly
"Guilty" (with Inessa)	2001	—	27	—	—	28	—	—	—	33	—		Fly
"Get It On"	2004	—	44	—	20	34	—	—	—	35	—		Fly
"What I Got"	2007	—	—	—	—	96	—	—	—	—	—		Hardcore on Videotape
"Isn't It True"	2009	—	—	—	—	—	—	—	—	—	—		Hardcore on Videotape
"Damage Is Done"	2011	—	—	—	—	64	—	—	—	—	—		Hardcore on Videotape

Other singles

- 2002: "Cielo e Terra (Heaven and Earth)" (with Nek)
- 2016: "Lonely" (with DJ Tomekk)
- 2021: "Miss Köllefornia" (Eko Fresh & Dante Thomas)
- 2022: "Call me Tonight" (Mazio & Dante Thomas)

Featured in

Year	Single	Peak chart positions				Certifications (sales thresholds)	Album
Year	Single	AUT	FRA	GER	SWI	Certifications (sales thresholds)	Album
2012	"Diese Tage" (KRIS feat. Dante Thomas)	10	—	30	—		Immer wenn ich das hier hör
2012	"Feeling So Blue" (Michael Mind Project feat. Dante Thomas)	20	128	38	40		State of Mind
2012	"Nothing Lasts Forever" (Michael Mind Project feat. Dante Thomas)	34	—	40	26		State of Mind
