= Unnati =

Unnati is a given name. Notable people with the given name include:

- Unnati Davara, Indian beauty pageant contestant, model, and actress
- Unnati Hooda (born 2007), Indian badminton player
