= The Product G&B =

American contemporary R&B duo

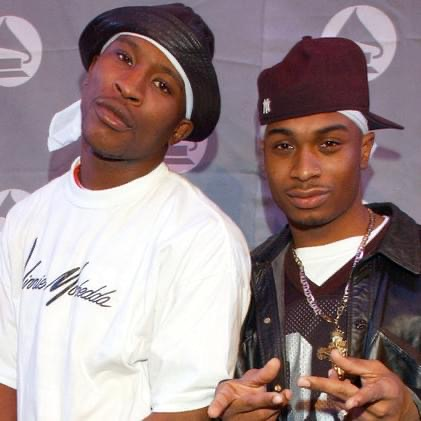
- The Product G&B: David "Sincere" McRae (right) and Marvin "Money Harm" Moore-Hough (left).

Background information
- Genre: R&B
- Years active: 1998–present
- Members: David McRae; Marvin Moore-Hough

The Product G&B is an American hip hop/R&B vocal duo consisting of David McRae (known as Sincere Gubano) and Marvin Moore-Hough (known as Money Harm). They were members of the Fugees' Refugee Camp All-Stars musical collective. The duo collaborated with Pras on the UK top ten hit single "Blue Angels". They later worked alongside Wyclef Jean and Carlos Santana on the track "Maria Maria", which became a global hit and won them the Grammy Award for Best Pop Performance by a Duo or Group with Vocals.

== Career ==
After meeting Pras of the Fugees, they joined Refugee Camp All-Stars collective. The duo lent their vocals to several tracks on Pras' Ghetto Supastar (1998) album, such as the single "Blue Angels". In 1999, Wyclef Jean convinced Arista Records chief Clive Davis to release the track "Maria Maria"—The Project G&B's collaboration with Carlos Santana—as a late summer single, a decision that contributed to Santana's Supernatural (1999) album eventually selling over 30 million copies worldwide. The song became a global number-one hit, and was ranked as the third most-successful song of 1999 on the Billboard Hot 100. In early 2000, the song won the award for Best Pop Performance by a Duo or Group with Vocals at the 42nd Annual Grammy Awards.

The duo then released the singles, "Cluck Cluck", "Dirty Dancin'", and "I'm Tired of Being Broke", the latter featuring 50 Cent.

The Product G&B were featured on M.O.P.'s DJ Premier-produced song "Everyday" from the album Warriorz (2000).

Later, in 2009, the duo was featured on Squala Orphan's song "U Don't Know" from the album Unheard Cries (2009).

In 2011, McRae formed a rock band called Guitars N Bandanaz with himself and rapper Mike Street. On May 31, 2013, they released the song "V.I.P." with Kay One. The single charted in several European markets. A year later, on May 23, 2014, they released an EP through Universal Music, with DJ Mr. Da-Nos, called Summer Nights in Brazil; the recording earned the group a nomination for Best Swiss Act at the 2014 MTV Europe Music Awards.

== Discography ==
- 2001: Ghetto & Blues
