= Free (television host) =

American rapper (born 1968)

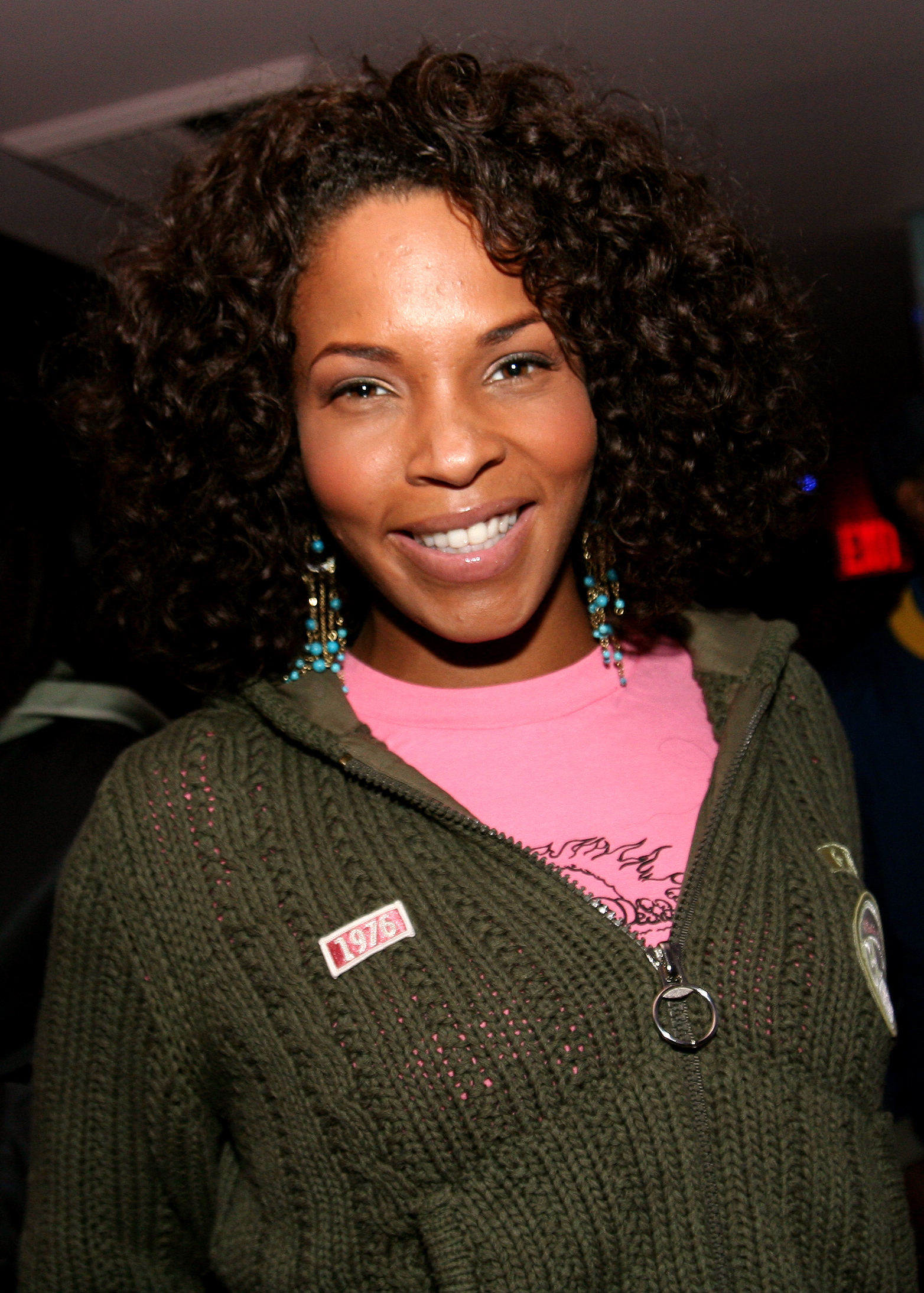
- Free in April 2005

Background information
- Also known as: Marie Antoinette (1996–2000)
- Born: Marie Antoinette Wright; February 7, 1968 (age 58)
- Origin: Dorchester, Boston, Massachusetts, U.S.
- Genre: Hip hop
- Occupations: Singer-songwriter; rapper; music producer; television personality; choreographer; radio personality
- Years active: 1991–present
- Website: Freesworld.com

Marie Antoinette Wright (born February 7, 1968), better known by her stage name Free, is an American media personality, television producer, choreographer, rapper, and philanthropist. She is best known as one of the original hosts of Black Entertainment Television's 106 & Park.

Beginning her career as a member of Wyclef Jean's Refugee Camp All-Stars musical collective, she made an appearance on Jean's 1998 remix of Queen's "Another One Bites the Dust" alongside Pras, which reached the top five on the UK singles chart. Free was also featured on the song "Fighting Temptation" alongside Beyoncé, Missy Elliott and MC Lyte from the soundtrack The Fighting Temptations: Music from the Motion Picture. After leaving 106 & Park in 2005, she served as a disc jockey at KKBT 100.3 The Beat in L.A., and was also a morning drive co-host at WPGC-FM in Washington, D.C.. Free is the former co-host of The Ed Lover Morning Show on Power 105.1 in New York.

== Early life and career ==
Free was born to African-American parents. She became involved in the arts as a child in Boston, Massachusetts. She attended the Roxbury Center for Performing Arts for 11 years, but traveled and toured as part of a young dance troupe. Inspired by her hometown group New Edition, she was part of a few groups in Boston performing and winning talent shows, while improving her singing and rap skills. One of her biggest breaks in her dancing career was performing in the 1991 hip-hop music video of Good Vibrations by Marky Mark and the Funky Bunch.

Free left Boston to immerse herself in her true passion: music. One of Free's "stepping stones" was an internship at a radio station in Massachusetts, where she began to make a name for herself. She then made career moves between Los Angeles and New York City in an effort to build the structure of her calling. She appeared on the track "Patriots", the second track on Can-I-Bus, the debut album from critically acclaimed hip-hop artist Canibus. This appearance was her first major appearance and the album eventually went gold. Her appearance on the album was a direct result of her signing a recording contract with Wyclef Jean and joining his Refugee Camp collective.

Free stated: “What influenced me to chase after my dreams was music itself; its power and creative medium." Fate led her to a casting held by BET, where executives chose her to co-host (with AJ Calloway) their signature show based in New York: 106 & Park: Top 10 Live. During her 5 years at 106 & Park, Free interviewed notable people such as Michael Jackson, Denzel Washington, Aaliyah, Halle Berry, Mariah Carey, Maxwell, Alicia Keys, Janet Jackson, and Beyoncé.

In 2003, Free began to record a full-length debut studio album titled, Pressure Free, which was expected to be released in Spring of 2008. Free went on to promote the album and release rumored singles via underground mixtapes from early 2003 throughout 2007. A rumored single, Uh Huh, featuring Busta Rhymes, leaked via Internet in the aspiration of she, again generating rumors for the album. Contributors for the debut included Faith Evans, Bink, Scott Storch, Rockwilder, Kanye West, Just Blaze, Rah Digga, Timbaland, and Missy Elliott. As of 2012, there is no confirmation if the album will be released.

On December 1, 2009, Clear Channel Radio's Power 105.1 (WWPR-FM, New York) had (along with added R&B, hip hop, and old-school jams) announced that Malikha Mallette would move to co-host on The Ed Lover Show, from 5:30 AM until 9:30 AM; meanwhile, DJ Envy would be Power 105.1's new afternoon personality, between 2:00 PM and 6:00 PM on weekdays. The announcement was made by Cadillac Jack, Power 105.1's program director. Free stated on her Twitter page, "Ok that's a Tuesday morning for ya: As of now I will no longer be heard on Power 105 in the A.M.: NY thanks for the laughs..rock on."

In October 2010, Free returned to BET once again to produce and star in 106 & Park’s two-episode anniversary show, titled 106 & Park: 10 Years & Counting and 106 & Park: The Celebration, 10 Years Live!. Both shows earned the highest 106 & Park ratings in BET history.

She could also be seen yet again on BET, as a presenter at the inaugural Black Girls Rock! on November 7, 2010.

On May 9, 2011, Free began co-hosting The Big Tigger Morning Show on “The People’s Station” WPGC (95.5 FM), serving the regions of Washington, D.C., Maryland, and Northern Virginia; she hosted alongside Darian "Big Tigger" Morgan from 6:00 AM until 10:00 AM, weekdays. Several months later, Big Tigger was fired, and Free continued the morning radio show without him.

On December 19, 2014, Free again returned to BET, hosting the final episode of 106 & Park, titled "The Final Act" (with A. J. Calloway, Bow Wow, Terrence J and Rocsi).

== Philanthropy ==
In 2002, Free founded the Free4Life Foundation, a non-profit dedicated to empowering young people in disadvantaged neighborhoods through programs that encourage literacy, financial education and creative arts. The Free4Life Foundation has created opportunities that inspire, support, encourage and strengthen the healthy development of young people in Boston's underserved communities. Initially focused on eradicating domestic violence and improving financial literacy, Free is currently in the process of expanding the depth and breadth of the foundation's scope. Through the foundation, Free also launched the successful fundraising event, Break! Break!.

Free is also an advocate for breast cancer awareness. In October 2010, she participated in the American Cancer Society's "Making Strides Against Breast Cancer" charity walk in honor of her late mother Selina "Tina" Wright. She later formed team "Walk 4 Tina," as she and her family walked 5.7 miles to help raise donations and awareness.

== Discography ==
- 2004: Free's World (mixtape)
- 2007: Pressure Free (shelved)

Album appearances

- 1998: Canibus – "Can-I-Bus" (On "Patriots")
- 1998: Pras – "Ghetto Supastar" (On "What'cha Wanna Do") and (On "Can't Stop The Shining)
- 2000: Wyclef Jean – The Ecleftic: 2 Sides II a Book (on "Da Cypha")
- 2001: Erick Sermon – React (on "We Don't Care")
- 2001: Ed O.G. – The Truth Hurts (on "Just Because")
- 2009: Lisa "Left-Eye" Lopes — Eye Legacy (on "Spread Your Wings")

Remixes

- 1999: "Bring It All to Me (Triple Threat Mix)" — Blaque (feat. NY Glaze, Jazz-Ming Mackey, and Free)
- 2003: "21 Answers" — Lil' Mo

Soundtracks

- 1996: The Associate (on "Mr. Big Stuff" with Queen Latifah and Shades)
- 1999: Music Inspired by the Motion Picture Life – (on "What Goes Around" with Khadejia)
- 2000: The PJs: Music from & Inspired by the Hit Television Series – "Holiday" (with Earth, Wind & Fire)
- 2003: The Fighting Temptations: Music from the Motion Picture (on "Fighting Temptation" — Beyoncé (feat. Missy Elliott, MC Lyte, and Free)
