= Ghetto Supastar (That Is What You Are) =

1998 single by Pras featuring Ol' Dirty Bastard and Mýa

Single by Pras Michel featuring Ol' Dirty Bastard and Mýa

from the album Ghetto Supastar and Bulworth
- Released: May 11, 1998
- Length: 4:26
- Label: Interscope
- Songwriters: Wyclef Jean; Russell Jones; Prakazrel Michel; Barry Gibb; Maurice Gibb; Robin Gibb; James Brown; Bobby Byrd; Ron Lenhoff
- Producers: Wyclef Jean; Pras

Pras Michel singles chronology
"Avenues" (1997)	"Ghetto Supastar (That Is What You Are)" (1998)	"Blue Angels" (1998)

Mýa singles chronology
"It's All About Me" (1998)	"Ghetto Supastar" (1998)	"Movin' On" (1998)

Ol' Dirty Bastard singles chronology
"Fix (Main Mix)" (1998)	"Ghetto Supastar" (1998)	"Got Your Money" (1999)

"Ghetto Supastar (That Is What You Are)" is a song by American rapper Pras (credited on the cover art as "Pras Michel"), featuring Wu-Tang Clan member Ol' Dirty Bastard and R&B singer Mýa. Produced by Pras and Wyclef Jean, with co-production from Jerry 'Wonda" Duplessis and Che Pope, it interpolates Kenny Rogers and Dolly Parton's 1983 single "Islands in the Stream", as written by the Bee Gees, and samples "Get Up, Get into It, Get Involved" by James Brown. Also featured on the soundtrack for the 1998 film Bulworth, the song was released as Pras' debut solo single and the second from his debut solo album Ghetto Supastar on May 11, 1998.

A worldwide commercial success, the song became a number-one hit in New Zealand and throughout Europe, including Germany, Ireland, and the Netherlands. In the United States, "Ghetto Supastar (That Is What You Are)" peaked at number 15 for five consecutive weeks on the US Billboard Hot 100. It was eventually certified platinum by the Recording Industry Association of America (RIAA) and in 1999, received a nomination for Best Rap Performance by a Duo or Group at the 41st Grammy Awards.

== Background ==
"Ghetto Supastar (That Is What You Are)" was written by Pras, Wyclef Jean, and Ol' Dirty Bastard. The song contains an interpolation from Kenny Rogers and Dolly Parton's 1983 single "Islands in the Stream." Due to the clip, its writers, brothers Barry, Robin, and Maurice Gibb, are also credited as songwriters on "Ghetto Supastar". The song also samples "Get Up, Get into It, Get Involved", as written by James Brown, Bobby Byrd, and Ron Lenhoff and performed by the former.

According to Mya, Interscope Records tried to consult more established singers to sing the chorus on the song, including Mary J. Blige. It was not until Ol' Dirty Bastard joined the project, that he – after listening to her self-titled debut album – persuaded Pras and Jean to use her vocals on the track.

== Critical reception ==
In his review for Entertainment Weekly, David Browne wrote: "This left-field remake of the Kenny Rogers-Dolly Parton hit 'Islands in the Stream' is a far better showcase for Mya; with her buttery rendering of the song’s hooky chorus, she paints herself as the world’s most streetwise, levelheaded groupie. As for the rest of the track, its combination of slinky guitar, scratching, and scratchy ODB growl (or is that now "scratchy Big Baby Jesus growl"?) makes it a dozen times more fun than Bulworth itself."

== Music video ==
Francis Lawrence directed the video, which features Bulworth stars Warren Beatty, Halle Berry, Oliver Platt, and Joshua Malina. In a play on the theme of the film, which is a prominent white politician acting like a Black American, Bulworth – as played by Beatty – in the music video begins to stretch his mouth, revealing himself to be Pras in a mask, who has just become the first African-American US president. Shortly after Pras gets pushed in an elevator, he takes off his suit and performs.

Apart from Mya and Ol' Dirty Bastard, Wyclef Jean also appears on the set playing the bass guitar riff at the end of the song. The music video was nominated for an MTV Video Music Award for Best Rap Video and Best Video from a Film. It also received three nominations at the 1998 Billboard Video Music Awards for Best New Artist Clip (Pop), Best New Artist Clip (Rap), and Best New Artist Clip (R&B).

== Track listing ==
- German CD single
  1. "Ghetto Supastar" (Main Version) – 4:26
  2. "Ghetto Supastar" (Instrumental) – 4:26
  3. "Ghetto Supastar" (Acapella) – 4:08
  4. "Don't Be Afraid" (performed by Mýa) – 4:48
- UK CD single
  1. "Ghetto Supastar" (Main Version) – 4:26
  2. "Ghetto Supastar" (Instrumental) – 4:26
  3. "Don't Be Afraid" (performed by Mýa) – 4:48
- 12-inch vinyl
  1. "Ghetto Supastar" (Main Version) – 4:26
  2. "Ghetto Supastar" (TV Mix) – 4:26
  3. "Ghetto Supastar" (Instrumental) – 4:26
  4. "Ghetto Supastar" (Acapella) – 4:08

== Personnel ==
- Written by P. Michel, W. Jean, B. Gibb, M. Gibb, R. Gibb, J. Brown, B. Byrd, R. Lenhoff
- Co-produced by J. Duplessis, C. Pope
- Contains a sample from "Under the Influence of Love" by Love Unlimited
- Contains an interpolation of "Islands In The Stream" by the Bee Gees and samples "Get Up, Get Into It, Get Involved" by James Brown
- Taken from the soundtrack of Bulworth
- Engineered by Chris Theis and Phil Blackman
- Soundtrack executive producer: Karyn Rachtman
- Original sound recordings owned by Interscope Records
- Universal Music (UK) Ltd. are exclusive licensees for the United Kingdom
- Distributed by BMG Records (UK) Ltd.
- Pras appears courtesy of Refugee Camp Entertainment / RuffHouse / Columbia Records
- ODB appears courtesy of Elektra Entertainment Group
- Mýa appears courtesy of University Music Entertainment / Interscope

== Charts ==
=== Weekly charts ===
Chart (1998)	Peak position
Australia (ARIA)	2
Austria (Ö3 Austria Top 40)	1
Belgium (Ultratop 50 Flanders)	1
Belgium (Ultratop 50 Wallonia)	4
Canada Top Singles (RPM)	9
Canada Dance/Urban (RPM)	5
Denmark (IFPI)	1
Europe (Eurochart Hot 100)	1
France (SNEP)	15
Finland (Suomen virallinen lista)	4
Germany (GfK)	1
Iceland (Íslenski Listinn Topp 40)	2
Ireland (IRMA)	1
Italy (Musica e dischi)	3
Italy Airplay (Music & Media)	4
Netherlands (Dutch Top 40)	1
Netherlands (Single Top 100)	1
New Zealand (Recorded Music NZ)	1
Norway (VG-lista)	1
Scottish Singles Sales (Official Charts)	3
Spain (AFYVE)	4
Sweden (Sverigetopplistan)	2
Switzerland (Schweizer Hitparade)	1
UK Singles (Official Charts)	2
UK Dance (Official Charts)	1
UK Hip Hop/R&B (Official Charts)	1
US Billboard Hot 100	15
US Hot Latin Songs (Billboard)	37
US Hot R&B/Hip-Hop Songs (Billboard)	8
US Hot Rap Songs (Billboard)	19
US Pop Airplay (Billboard)	21
US Rhythmic Airplay (Billboard)	2

=== Year-end charts ===
Chart (1998)	Position
Australia (ARIA)	13
Austria (Ö3 Austria Top 40)	4
Belgium (Ultratop 50 Flanders)	16
Belgium (Ultratop 50 Wallonia)	32
Canada Top Singles (RPM)	50
Canada Dance (RPM)	37
Europe (Eurochart Hot 100)	7
France (SNEP)	56
Germany (Media Control)	11
Iceland (Íslenski Listinn Topp 40)	35
Netherlands (Dutch Top 40)	20
Netherlands (Single Top 100)	17
New Zealand (RIANZ)	19
Norway Spring Period (VG-lista)	13
Sweden (Hitlistan)	16
Switzerland (Schweizer Hitparade)	3
UK Singles (OCC)	9
UK Urban (Music Week)	24
US Billboard Hot 100	70
US Hot R&B Singles (Billboard)	60
US Mainstream Top 40 (Billboard)	51
US Rhythmic Top 40 (Billboard)	7

=== Decade-end charts ===
Chart (1990–1999)	Rank
Austria (Ö3 Austria Top 40)	44

== Certifications ==
Region	Certification	Certified units/sales
Australia (ARIA)	Platinum	70,000^{^}
Austria (IFPI Austria)	Platinum	50,000^{*}
Belgium (BRMA)	Platinum	50,000^{*}
France (SNEP)	Gold	250,000^{*}
Germany (BVMI)	Platinum	500,000^{^}
Netherlands (NVPI)	Gold	50,000^{^}
New Zealand (RMNZ)	2× Platinum	60,000^{‡}
Norway (IFPI Norway)	Platinum	
Sweden (GLF)	2× Platinum	60,000^{^}
United Kingdom (BPI)	2× Platinum	1,200,000^{‡}
^{*} Sales figures based on certification alone.^{^} Shipments figures based on certification alone.^{‡} Sales+streaming figures based on certification alone.

== Release history ==
Region	Date	Format(s)	Label(s)	Ref.
United States	May 11, 1998	Urban radio	Interscope	
United Kingdom	June 15, 1998	12-inch vinyl; CD; cassette	Interscope; Universal	
United States	June 16, 1998	Contemporary hit radio	Interscope	

== Cover versions ==
"Weird Al" Yankovic included the song in his polka medley "Polka Power!" from his 1999 album Running with Scissors. The Bee Gees recorded a version of "Islands in the Stream" with the chorus of "Ghetto Supastar" replacing the final chorus for their retrospective 2001 compilation Their Greatest Hits: The Record. It also appeared on their 2004 Number Ones and on the 2010 Mythology box set.

In August 2011, Taylor Swift covered "Ghetto Supastar" during the North American leg of her Speak Now World Tour. In each city, she chose to pay tribute to a homegrown artist. In Washington, D.C., she performed an acoustic version of "Ghetto Supastar", given that Mýa is from Washington, D.C. Swift referred to the song as her "second grade anthem".

In 2017, singer and actress Vanessa Hudgens posted a video of herself singing "Ghetto Supastar" a capella on Instagram.
