= Swami (band) =

Pop-Bhangra band

- Origin: Birmingham, England
- Genres: Electronic, bhangra, pop
- Years active: 1998–present
- Labels: Nation Records (to 2004); Envy/Roma Music (2004, Britain); Sony BMG India (2005–2006, India); EMI/Virgin (2007–)
- Members: Diamond "DJ Swami" Duggal (DJ producer, guitar, keys) (1999– ) and special guests
- Past members: S-Endz (vocals) (2003–2017 ) Sups (vocals) (2005–2017); Liana (vocals) (2007–2017); Bobby Panesar (dhol) (2006–2016); Tarsame 'Speed' Jarnail (vocals) (1999–2000); Kamaljit 'Kamo' Bura (percussion) (1999–2000); Simon 'Subs' Duggal (drums and production) (1999–2000); Baba Stormz (bass guitar) (2005–2006); Rocky Singh (drums) (2005–2006); Jagz (vocals) (2004–2005); MC Sarpanch (vocals) (2004–2005)
- Website: www.swamimusic.com

Swami is a British Indian electronic music/ bhangra/ world music act from Birmingham, England. "Swami" is also the pseudonym of the DJ producer Diamond Duggal (aka DJ Swami). Swami currently performs as a hybrid electronic DJ act with special world music guests and collaborations including Deep Forest and PunjabTronix.

== History ==
Swami's debut dance album Desi Nu Skool Beatz was initially released on Simon & Diamond Duggal's own Sub Dub label in 1999. The album was picked up by Nation Records. Described as "blinding" by the Birmingham Post, the album received some international recognition when the opening track Mehbooba appeared in the 2004 Olsen twins movie New York Minute. Desi Nu Skool Beatz was followed by the 2002 album Bhangradotcom, which was less dance-oriented.

== 2004–2006: DesiRock/ So Who AM I? ==
Swami's big break came with the release of the third album DesiRock, which became popular in the British Asian music scene. By this time Diamond was the only original member remaining and had recruited his cousin S-Endz as rap vocalist in the band alongside British bhangra singer Jagz and MC Sarpanch.

The title track DesiRock features guest Indian Punjabi vocalist Lehmber Hussainpuri and was voted a BBC Radio 1 favourite, which led to a Maida Vale session in the summer of 2005. The track also appeared in the Official 2006 FIFA World Cup Germany edition of EA Sports' FIFA series of video games. In the same year DJ Swami won the Media Storm Best Producer award at the UK Asian Music Awards, as well as being nominated for Best Track (DesiRock) and Best Group.

In late 2005, Swami signed a deal with Sony BMG to release DesiRock in India as So Who Am I with a new line-up without Sarpanch and replacing Jagz with new vocalist Supreet Suri (aka Sups). With a heavily rock, electronic and Punjbai sound (nearly all songs re-recorded with live guitar and drums), Swami embarked on a promotional tour of India which included a performance at the MTV Style Awards. The Hindu credited Swami with bringing British bhangra back to prominence in Indian clubs.

A fourth album of live recording sessions was scheduled to be released in the spring of 2006. Two songs from the sessions have been heard, "Afraid" and "No Apologies", both at one stage were available on the band's Myspace site. "Afraid"'s 'bhangra-fied mix' was played on the BBC's Desi DNA programme. These recordings remain otherwise unreleased.

In December 2006, dhol player and percussionist Bobby Panesar joined the band.

== 2007–2009: Equalize ==
In March 2007, an update was made to Swami's website, containing details of the forthcoming album and revealed that it would feature many guest appearances including Pras of the Fugees, Boostylz, Lady Ru, French rappers Asuivre, South African vocalist Ishmael, MC Spee from the band Dreadzone, Yam Boy and more.

It was later announced that Swami's 2007 release was to be named Equalize and would be out in the fall following a tour including Wychwood and Glastonbury festivals.

BBC Radio 1 premièred "Hey Hey", the first single from Equalize on 14 August. After this, Radio 1 DJ Bobby Friction announced that Swami would soon be performing an exclusive live session at Maida Vale. The session was recorded and broadcast at the end of September and featured many new songs from Equalize and guest appearances from some of the featured artists including Boostylz, MC Spee and Ishmael Ghetto Ruff.

Equalize was released in the UK on 24 September, and in mid November a music video began rotating for "Hey Hey".

In December 2007, Swami announced that they had signed a new record deal with Virgin/EMI and would soon be releasing Equalize in India and South Asia. The major label release is a new version including bonus tracks, one of them being an all-new version of the track "Electro Jugni" featuring Swedish popstar DeDe Lopez.

In January 2008, Swami won the Album of the Year award on DesiHits, and were nominated for three awards (Best Album, Best Producer and Best Underground Act) at the 2008 UK Asian Music Awards. Diamond (DJ Swami) was awarded the Best Producer award, but could not attend the event, so S-Endz, Liana and Bobby Panesar accepted the award on his behalf.

In February 2008, Swami appeared on the UK TV show Desi DNA on BBC 2 and performed "Ching" and "Electro Jugni". The performance of "Electro Jugni" was also the début of Swami's new vocalist Liana. The video to "Electro Jugni" was shot a few weeks later.

In June 2008, Swami revealed a forthcoming digital EP of Electro Jugni/She's Mine. Both songs are new versions, "Electro Jugni" is a new Punjabi and Hindi version, and "She's Mine" is an all-new English version of the song. Both songs feature new vocals from Sups, S-Endz and Liana. The EP was eventually released on 9 March 2009.

In August 2008, Swami's "Hey Hey" music video received its Canadian première at Toronto's FILMI South Asian Film Festival, as part of FILMI's début music video night programmed by Deejay Ra.

The video for "Electro Jugni" was premièred on the DesiHits website on 23 October 2008.

A trailer for the music video to "She's Mine" appeared in March 2009, but the full video was not released.

In 2024, a deluxe version of the Equalize album was released to Spotify containing 11 bonus tracks.

== 2009–2011: 53431 ==
On 12 June 2009, the Swami song "Sugarless" premièred via the entertainment website DesiHits, who reported that the track would feature on an upcoming Swami compilation called 53431 that would contain the hits from the band's previous studio albums, two new songs ("Sugarless" and "Tonight"), and two remixes.

"Sugarless" received heavy worldwide radio support following its première, and shortly afterwards the band released a heavier dance remix, entitled "Sugarless (The New Desi Generation Remix)" which also went on to receive airplay.

53431 was released on 17 August 2009 and the music video for "Sugarless" premièred in early September.

In an interview with Eastern Eye newspaper in November 2009, Swami revealed they were currently working on a new album and it would be "an international English electronic pop album which will be released by a major US label".

In a newsletter sent out on 27 January 2010, S-Endz mentioned that he and Diamond had written 20 new songs for the new album, and that the 20 songs would all be completed before the best ones were chosen.

The Sugarless Tour 2010 took place in the UK and Canada across June and July, and the set included several new songs from the upcoming album.

== 2011–2017: Upgrade ==
On 17 May 2011, a new track entitled "Dumdaraka (Dub Upgrade)" was released to BBC Radio 1 and Asian Network. The following week, on 24 May, Diamond revealed in an interview with DJ Nihal on BBC Radio 1 that the new album is entitled Upgrade.

In December 2012, a video preview of "Back It Up", the first official single from the new album was uploaded to Swami's official YouTube channel. On 12 January 2013, the single was released in two different versions – the original mix, sung in English, and the Desi Mix, sung in a mix of English, Punjabi and Hindi. The two tracks were released as a free download on the band's official website.

In August 2014, Swami announced filming of a new music video in India for a song called "Do It Again". The track was released on 7 November 2014, with several remixes including Dub and Extended versions released in January 2015.

On 6 July 2015, Swami premiered a new song entitled "We Are" on Australian radio station PBS 106.7FM in Melbourne, on the Mumbai Masala show hosted by Richi Madan. On 2 August, Swami released a new EP entitled Upgrade in Progress featuring "We Are" alongside all the previously released songs, "Back It Up", "Do It Again", "Dumdaraka" (now renamed Dhoomdaraka) and a previously unreleased unplugged mix of "Do It Again".

In May 2017, Swami released the album Upgrade on the Times Music label in India and South Asia. The lead single "Dil Vich" featuring the vocalist Lovely Pawar was released to coincide with the album release. The album was accompanied by a remixed DJ friendly electronic/deep/tech house version of the album entitled SIDETRKD. A deluxe version of the album featuring both versions was also made available.

In August 2017, the Swami albums Upgrade and SIDETRKD were released internationally via INgrooves on the Station 5 label.

== Discography ==
- Desi Nu Skool Beatz (1999)
- BhangraDotCom (2002)
- DesiRock (2004)
- So Who AM I (2005)
- Equalize (2007)
- Electro Jugni/She's Mine EP (2009)
- 53431 (2009)
- Upgrade (2017)
- SIDETRKD (2017)
