= Pras =

American rapper (born 1972)

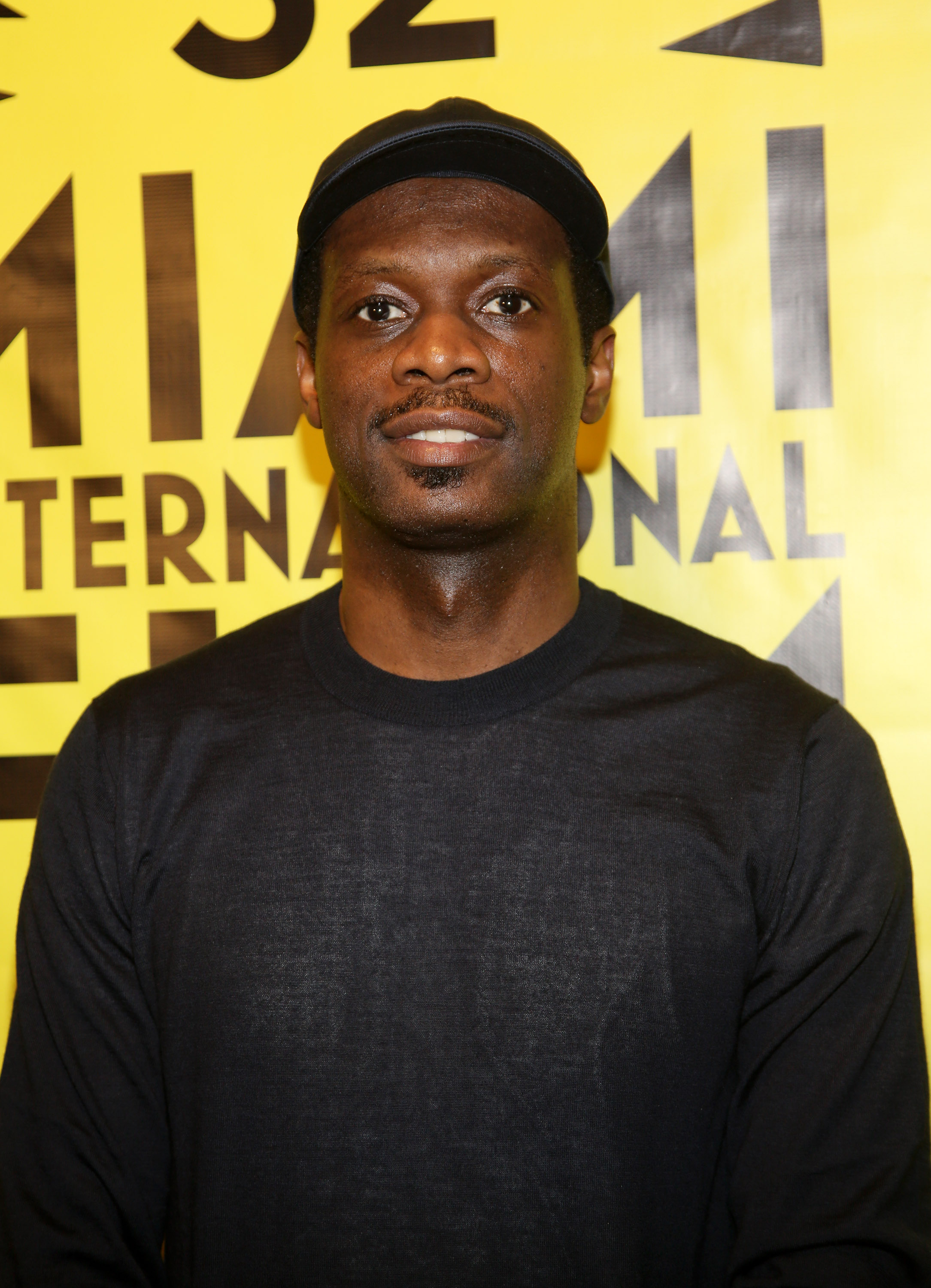
- Pras at the 2015 Miami International Film Festival

Background information
- Born: Prakazrel Samuel Michel; October 19, 1972 (age 54); New York City, U.S.
- Origin: Irvington, New Jersey, U.S.
- Genres: East Coast hip-hop; alternative hip-hop; pop rap
- Occupations: Rapper; singer; songwriter; record producer; actor
- Years active: 1989–2025
- Labels: Columbia; Ruffhouse; Guerrilla
- Member of: Fugees

Prakazrel Samuel Michel (born October 19, 1972), known professionally as Pras (/ˈprɑːz/), is an American rapper, singer and actor. He is best known as a founding member of the hip-hop group Fugees, which he formed with fellow New Jerseyans Wyclef Jean and Lauryn Hill in 1990.

As a solo act, he signed with Columbia Records in 1996 and earned two top 40 hits on the Billboard Hot 100 with his 1997 single "Avenues" (with Refugee Camp All-Stars featuring Ky-Mani Marley) and his Grammy Award-nominated 1998 single "Ghetto Supastar (That Is What You Are)" (featuring Ol' Dirty Bastard and Mýa). The latter was released for the Warren Beatty film Bulworth (1998), while both preceded the release of his debut studio album, Ghetto Supastar (1998).

He also collaborated with Jean and rock band Queen on the 1998 remix of "Another One Bites the Dust", which reached the top five on the UK Singles Chart. In 2017, he won a Daytime Emmy Award for Outstanding Digital Daytime Drama Series for his work as a producer on the web series The Bay.

In 2019, he began to face legal issues when he was charged with criminal conspiracy for alleged illegal donations to President Barack Obama's 2012 presidential re-election campaign and lobbying the Trump administration to deter investigations into the 1MDB scandal involving fugitive Malaysian businessman Jho Low. In 2023, Pras was found guilty of 10 criminal counts in the U.S. District Court for the District of Columbia, and in November 2025, he was sentenced to 14 years in prison in connection with the case.

== Early life ==
Michel was born in Brooklyn, New York City, and raised in Irvington, New Jersey. He is Haitian-American. Pras cultivated an early interest in music. When he was 15, he met Lauryn Hill while both attended Columbia High School in Maplewood, New Jersey. In 1988, Pras introduced Hill to Wyclef Jean. Pras, Jean, and Hill began to rehearse under the guidance of Kool and the Gang's producer, Ronald Khalis Bell, and subsequently they formed a musical group called The Rap Translators in 1989 (also known as Tranzlator Crew). Pras attended college at Rutgers University and Yale University after high school, pursuing a double major in Philosophy and Psychology.

== Personal life ==
Michel has a daughter Theodora, with film producer Gisella Marengo.

== Career ==
=== Music ===
From 1992 to 1993, The Fugees recorded their first album Blunted on Reality, under the supervision of Ronald Khalis Bell. In 1996, The Fugees achieved historic crossover success with The Score, which went multi-platinum.

Pras has also forged a successful solo career, beginning with an international hit single from his first full-length solo LP, "Ghetto Supastar (That Is What You Are)", featuring Mýa and Ol' Dirty Bastard. "Ghetto Superstar" became a top ten single in 1999, and the eighth most played single. The song earned Pras a performance at the World Music Awards. The hit single was included in the soundtrack for the film Bulworth. "Ghetto Supastar" spent eight weeks in the UK Top 5, peaking at No. 2 in July 1998, and reached US No. 15 a month later. "Blue Angels", from the same album, was a UK Top 10 hit, reaching No. 6 in November.

Pras also featured on the track "Turn You On" by Swedish artist DeDe which was released in 2007. "Turn You On" was also written and produced by Pras. After nine weeks on Sweden's single chart, it peaked at No. 2. He also featured "Pushin'" from the album Equalize by Swami, which was released in 2007.

The Fugees were scheduled to begin their international reunion tour originally in 2021 which was cancelled due to the COVID-19 pandemic. In 2024, a new tour was announced. However, three days before the first show, it was cancelled without an explanation. In October 2024, Pras sued fellow member Lauryn Hill for breach of contract and fraud, also in regard to the cancelled tour. Hill herself replied that the lawsuit "is full of false claims and unwarranted attacks. It notably omits that he was advanced overpayment for the last tour and has failed to repay substantial loans extended by myself as an act of good will."

=== Film ===
After making a cameo in the 1999 feature film Mystery Men, Pras became interested in Hollywood. In 2000, Pras starred in the New Line film, Turn It Up. In early 2002, he appeared in the Sony and Urban World release Higher Ed. and Go for Broke in which he starred and produced. He also co-starred in three 20th Century Fox films in 2007. These included The Mutant Chronicles.

In 2006, Pras created Skid Row, Los Angeles, a documentary account of his nine-day experience posing as a homeless person living in downtown Los Angeles. Using a hidden camera, Pras captured the reality of homelessness. The film was produced by Teryn Fogel. Skid Row was released on August 24, 2007.

In 2009, Pras traveled to Somalia to film the documentary Paper Dreams, which examines piracy off the African coast. During filming, pirates invaded the ship he was on, the MV Maersk Alabama, and took the captain of the ship hostage. Originally due to be released in 2014, the documentary remains unfinished due to a legal dispute.

In 2015, Pras completed a documentary, Sweet Micky For President, which chronicles the rise of Haitian musician Michel Martelly, through his election to fight corruption as President of Haiti, an election campaign that was strongly endorsed by Pras. The film had its world premiere at the 2015 Slamdance Film Festival.

In 2017, he won a Daytime Emmy Award for Outstanding Digital Daytime Drama Series as a producer on the web series The Bay.

== Political activism ==
In 2013, Michel became a "top initial donor" to Organizing for Action, a political advocacy group formed by Obama associates in January 2013.

== Legal issues ==
The United States Department of Justice (DOJ) indicted Michel on May 10, 2019, for his part in an alleged criminal conspiracy with Malaysian financier Jho Low. The DOJ alleged that between June 2012 and November 2012, Michel aided in the illegal transfer of approximately $865,000 from foreign entities into the Barack Obama 2012 presidential campaign. The DOJ alleged that these funds were disguised as purportedly legitimate contributions, but were stolen from the Malaysian sovereign wealth fund 1Malaysia Development Berhad (1MDB). Ultimately, the DOJ alleged that $21 million in foreign campaign contributions were funneled into the 2012 US presidential election to benefit "Candidate A". The Washington Post and The New York Times identified "Candidate A" as Barack Obama.

In June 2021, Michel was charged by a federal grand jury for running a back-channel campaign to get the Trump administration to drop an investigation of Jho Low and the 1MDB investment company.

He was also accused of advocating for the extradition of a Chinese dissident, Guo Wengui, from the United States. In the plea documents of former DOJ employee George Higginbotham, Michel was accused of paying Republican fundraiser Elliott Broidy and others to have Guo extradited to China. Though unnamed in the filings, Michel is "easily identified" due to linked cases and confirmation from sources close to the case. Michel "vehemently and unequivocally" denied accusations related to Higginbotham's case.

As of 2021, due to the charges against him, Michel cannot travel internationally. In January 2022, Fugees cancelled their planned international reunion tour, citing the COVID-19 pandemic.

On April 26, 2023, Michel was found guilty of 10 criminal counts in the U.S. District Court for the District of Columbia. He was sentenced in November 2025 to 14 years in prison.

== Discography ==
=== Albums ===
Title	Album details	Peak chart positions								
Title	Album details	US	US R&B	AUS	GER	NOR	NZ	SWE	SWI	UK
Ghetto Supastar	Released: October 27, 1998; Label: Ruffhouse; Format: CD, LP, cassette, digital download	55	35	54	68	9	34	19	47	44
Win Lose or Draw	Released: August 16, 2005; Label: Universal; Format: CD, digital download	—	—	—	—	—	—	—	—	—
"—" denotes album that did not chart or was not released.

=== EPs ===
List of extended plays with selected details
Title	Details
Wave Culture	Released: May 22, 2018; Label: New Vision Management; Formats: Digital download

=== Singles ===
==== As lead artist ====
Title	Year	Peak chart positions											Certifications	Album
Title	Year	AUS	AUT	BEL	FIN	GER	NOR	NZ	SWE	SWI	UK	US	Certifications	Album
"Avenues" (featuring the Refugee Camp All-Stars)	1997	—	—	32	12	51	2	4	7	—	—	35		Ghetto Supastar
"Ghetto Supastar (That Is What You Are)" (featuring ODB and Mýa)	1998	2	1	1	4	1	1	1	2	1	2	15	BPI: 2× Platinum; RMNZ: 2× Platinum	Ghetto Supastar
"Blue Angels" (featuring The Product G&B)	1998	55	—	59	—	75	—	10	10	50	6	—		Ghetto Supastar
"What'cha Wanna Do" (featuring The Product G&B and Free)	1998	—	—	—	—	—	—	—	—	—	72	—		Ghetto Supastar
"Another One Bites the Dust" (Wyclef Jean and Queen featuring Pras and Free)	1998	—	23	13	7	46	20	9	50	35	5	—		Ghetto Supastar
"Haven't Found" (featuring Sharli McQueen)	2005	76	—	67	17	—	—	—	—	—	—	—		Win Lose or Draw
"Pump Fakin" (featuring Young M.A)	2017	—	—	—	—	—	—	—	—	—	—	—		TBA
"—" denotes single that did not chart or was not released.

==== As featured artist ====
Title	Year	Peak chart positions										Album
Title	Year	AUS	AUT	BEL	FIN	GER	NOR	NZ	SWE	SWI	UK	Album
"Never Turn Back" (Toshinobu Kubota featuring Pras)	2000	—	—	—	—	—	—	—	—	—	—	Nothing But Your Love
"Miss California" (Dante Thomas featuring Pras)	2001	5	4	2	—	1	13	5	6	2	25	Fly
"Turn You On" (Dede featuring Pras)	2007	—	—	—	11	—	—	—	2	—	—	—N/a
"Pushin'" (Swami featuring Pras and Ishmael)	2007	—	—	—	—	—	—	—	—	—	—	Equalize
"Le Blues" (Melissa M featuring Pras)	2008	—	—	—	—	—	—	—	—	—	—	—N/a
"My Man" (Anggun featuring Pras)	2008	—	—	—	—	—	—	—	—	—	—	Elevation
"Watch Out" (Jennifer Milan featuring Pras)	2010	—	—	—	—	—	—	—	—	—	—	22
"Untried" (Linda Kiraly featuring Pras and Rh3)	2012	—	—	—	—	—	—	—	—	—	—	—N/a
"—" denotes single that did not chart or was not released.

== Filmography ==
- Elmopalooza (1998)- Himself
- Mystery Men (1999) – Tony C (credited as Prakazrel Michel)
- Turn It Up (2000) – Denzel/Diamond (credited as Pras Michel) (co-producer)
- Da Hip Hop Witch (2000) - Himself
- Higher Ed (2001) – Ed Green (credited as Pras Michel) (executive producer)
- Go for Broke (2002) – Jackson/Jackie (credited as Pras Michel) (producer)
- Nora's Hair Salon (2004)
- Careful What You Wish For (2004) – Zen Salesman (credited as Pras Michel)
- Feel the Noise (2007) – Electric
- First Night (2007) – himself (producer)
- Skid Row (2007) – himself (producer)
- Mutant Chronicles (2007) – Captain Michaels (producer)
- Paper Dreams (2010) – himself (producer)
- Sweet Mickey for President (2015) – himself (producer)
