= So Who Am I =

Studio album by Swami
- Released: 2005
- Genre: Rock/Bhangra
- Label: Sony BMG
- Producer: DJ Swami

Swami chronology
DesiRock (2004)	So Who Am I (2005)	Equalize (2007)

So Who Am I is the fourth album by British bhangra group Swami. The album is a re-recorded and re-mixed version of their previous album, DesiRock, and contains massive musical differences, most notably, the tracks have all been re-done with live instruments, giving the album much more of a rock feel, compared to the more electronic sound of DesiRock.

Also, some of the songs on DesiRock featured MC Sarpanch, who was removed from the band in between these two albums. Therefore, all his vocals have been re-recorded by S-Endz on this release. This album also contains a new track - "DesiRock Part II". It was released on Sony BMG in 2005.

== Track listing ==
1. "DesiRock"
2. "Challa II"
3. "Don't Hold Back"
4. "Turn It Up"
5. "Hooked and Addicted"
6. "Bust da Mic"
7. "Throw 'Em Up"
8. "Hear Dis"
9. "Move"
10. "DesiRock Part II"
