= DesiRock =

Studio album by Swami
- Released: 2004
- Genre: Rock/Bhangra
- Label: DesiRock Entertainment
- Producer: DJ Swami

Swami chronology
BhangraDotCom (2002)	DesiRock (2004)	So Who Am I (2005)

DesiRock is the third album by British-Indian producer DJ Swami's alternative bhangra group Swami and is also the title of the album's electro/ bhangra/ rock fusion lead track. It is their most popular album to date and voted as one of BBC Radio 1's best DJ tracks of the year. It was also crowned the best album of the year by Eastern Eye newspaper. In the year after its release, producer DJ Swami won the Media Storm Best Producer award at the UK Asian Music Awards.

The album was Swami's first in the band's current lineup. The album cover shows DJ Swami, flanked by the band's two vocalists S-Endz and MC Sarpanch.

DesiRock Entertainment is the name of DJ Swami's record label and music production company specializing in progressive South Asian electronic music.

== Track listing ==
1. "DesiRock" (featuring Lehmber Hussainpuri & Stereo Nation) – 4:03
2. "Move" – 5:08
3. "Challa II" (featuring Lehmber Hussainpuri) – 5:13
4. "Don't Hold Back" – 5:28
5. "Hooked and Addicted" – 5:24
6. "Turn It Up" – 4:39
7. "Bust da Mic" – 5:32
8. "Hear Dis" – 5:32
9. "Throw 'Em Up" – 5:13
10. "DesiRock" (radio edit) – 4:01
