= Nikki Bedi =

British television and radio presenter

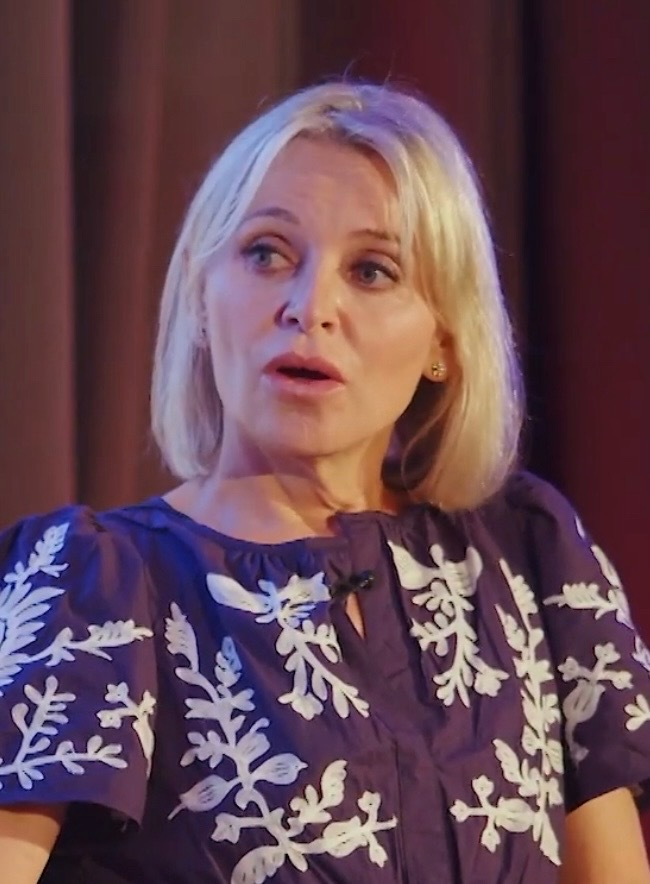
- Bedi at the British Library in 2023
- Born: Nikhila Moolgaoker; 9 September 1966 (age 59); Aylesbury, Buckinghamshire, England
- Occupation: Radio presenter
- Spouse: Kabir Bedi (m. 1992; div. 2005)

Nikki Bedi (/ˈbeɪdi/ BAY-dee; née Moolgaoker; born 9 September 1966) is a British television and radio presenter. She writes and presents The Arts Hour and The Arts Hour on Tour for the BBC World Service, and co-hosted BBC Radio 4's Saturday Live.

== Early and personal life ==
Nikhila Moolgaoker was born to an Indian father of Maharashtrian origin and an English mother. She was married to food stylist Sunil Vijayakar before her second marriage to Kabir Bedi from 1992 to 2005; she retained her married name after their divorce. She describes herself as "Indo-Anglian". Her paternal grandparents were the industrialist Sumant Moolgaokar, head of Tata Motors and Tata Steel, and social worker Leela Sumant Moolgaokar, a pioneer of blood transfusion in India.

== Career ==
Both a stage and television actress, Bedi began her career in Mumbai. Spotted by the UK's Channel 4, she hosted Bombay Chat, an on-location celebrity talk show. Star TV gave her a primetime slot for Nikki Tonight which quickly proved to be Asia's most widely viewed and controversial talk show, although it was subsequently cancelled by Star TV after a guest, gay rights activist Ashok Row Kavi, made a derogatory remark about Mahatma Gandhi.

Bedi then moved to live and work for a time in Los Angeles, before returning to the UK in 2000 to be the face of Universal's film channel The Studio for over two years. She also presented two live film shows for NOW, Worldwide Screen and Bollywood Today.

In 2003, Bedi began working in radio, appearing on LBC and BBC Radio 4. In 2004, she became the presenter of a new weekend morning programme called Hot Breakfast on the BBC Asian Network before taking over as presenter of the weekday afternoon show, Drive in 2005. In May 2006, as part of wide-ranging schedule changes, she was given her own show called Nikki Bedi on the BBC Asian Network. The daily show featured music, films, books, art and all things cultural and included interviews with prominent figures from those worlds.

She has covered for a number of key presenters on BBC Radio 2, BBC London 94.9 and BBC Radio 4 and in October 2008 fulfilled a long-held ambition by appearing in an episode of the BBC Radio 4 drama, The Archers. Bedi continued with her television work alongside radio, appearing as a presenter on BBC2's Desi DNA for three years and on the popular BBC One series To Buy or Not to Buy during 2010 and 2011.

Bedi was a Costa Book Awards judge in the New Novel category announced in Jan 2010 and has also been on the judging panel for the European Independent Film Festival Awards and the One World Media Awards. In February 2010, she presented a 3-part documentary series on BBC Radio 2 called Bollywood Britain. The series explores the history of Hindi film music and its lasting ties with generations of British Asians.

Bedi continues to be a voiceover artist, having voiced or narrated a wide variety of shows from the BBC Four documentary series Indian School to the Millies on ITV.

=== BBC Radio London, BBC World Service and BBC Radio 4 (2010–present) ===
Joining BBC Radio London in 2010, Bedi presented an evening weekend show until taking over as presenter of the Monday to Thursday overnight show in 2011. She has also been a regular stand-in presenter for key BBC Radio London shows and presenters including, the Lesley Joseph Show, the Vanessa Feltz Show, Eddie Nestor's Rum Shop, The Late Show with JoAnne Good and Gaby Roslin on The Breakfast Show.

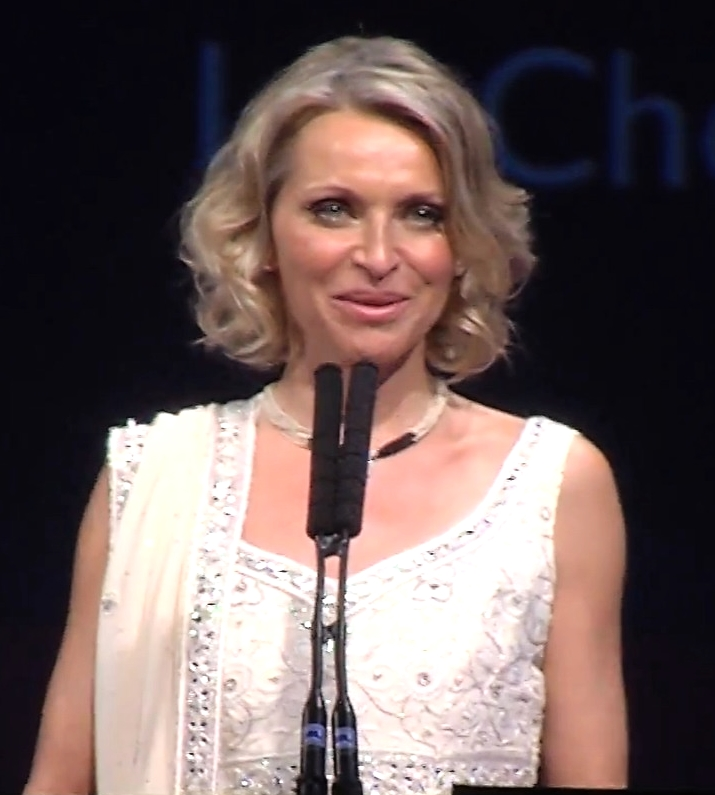
Bedi hosts the 4th Asian Awards in 2014

Early in 2013, Bedi moved to the BBC Radio London evening weekend show (Friday to Sunday), making way for her new weekday show The Arts Hour on the BBC World Service. Curated, written and presented by Bedi, The Arts Hour is a weekly collection of the most interesting arts related stories from across the BBC and elsewhere. In February 2016, Bedi moved to the weekday early breakfast on the renamed BBC Radio London. She left early breakfast in December 2016, and from January 2017 until April 2019, Bedi presented a Sunday mid morning show on BBC Radio London.

In August 2019, Bedi made her debut on Smooth Radio on a Sunday afternoon show.

Bedi has been associated with BBC Radio 4 for several years having become a regular interviewer on Loose Ends, presenting the show when usual host Clive Anderson was absent and she has also occasionally presented Woman's Hour. Bedi was co-host of Saturday Live from late 2020 to 2025.
