= Moolgaokar =

Moolgaokar is an Indian surname. Notable people with the surname include:

- Leela Sumant Moolgaokar (1916–1992), Indian social worker
- Sumant Moolgaokar (1906–1989), Indian industrialist
