= BBC Asian Network =

British radio network serving the South Asian community

- Logo used since 2022
- Birmingham; United Kingdom
- Frequencies: DAB: 12B BBC National DAB; AM: 828 kHz (Wolverhampton); AM: 837 kHz (Leicester); AM: 1449 kHz (Peterborough); AM: 1458 kHz (Birmingham); Freeview: 709; Freesat: 709; Sky: 0117; Virgin Media: 912

Programming
- Format: South Asian music/talk

Ownership
- Owner: BBC

History
- First air date: 4 November 1996; 29 years ago (on AM in the Midlands); 28 October 2002; 23 years ago (nationally on DAB)

Technical information
- Licensing authority: Ofcom

Links
- Website: www.bbc.co.uk/asiannetwork/

BBC Asian Network is a British digital radio station owned and operated by the BBC. The station's target audience is people "with an interest in British Asian lifestyles", especially those between the ages of 18 and 34. The station has production centres at The Mailbox in Birmingham and formerly the Broadcasting House in London.

The station broadcasts mainly in English, but has retained Sunday evening shows in South Asian languages. Despite the name, Asian Network covers only the Indian subcontinent, with the rest of the continent – such as Japan and China – not covered by the station.

The station's output consists largely of music and talk programmes. On Fridays at 3:00 pm, the station broadcasts The Official Asian Music Chart, compiled by the Official Charts Company and based on sales and streams across a seven-day period.

According to RAJAR, the station broadcasts to a weekly audience of 542,000 with a listening share of 0.2% as of March 2024.

== History ==
=== Origins as a regional programme / station ===
BBC Asian Network logo (2012–2022)

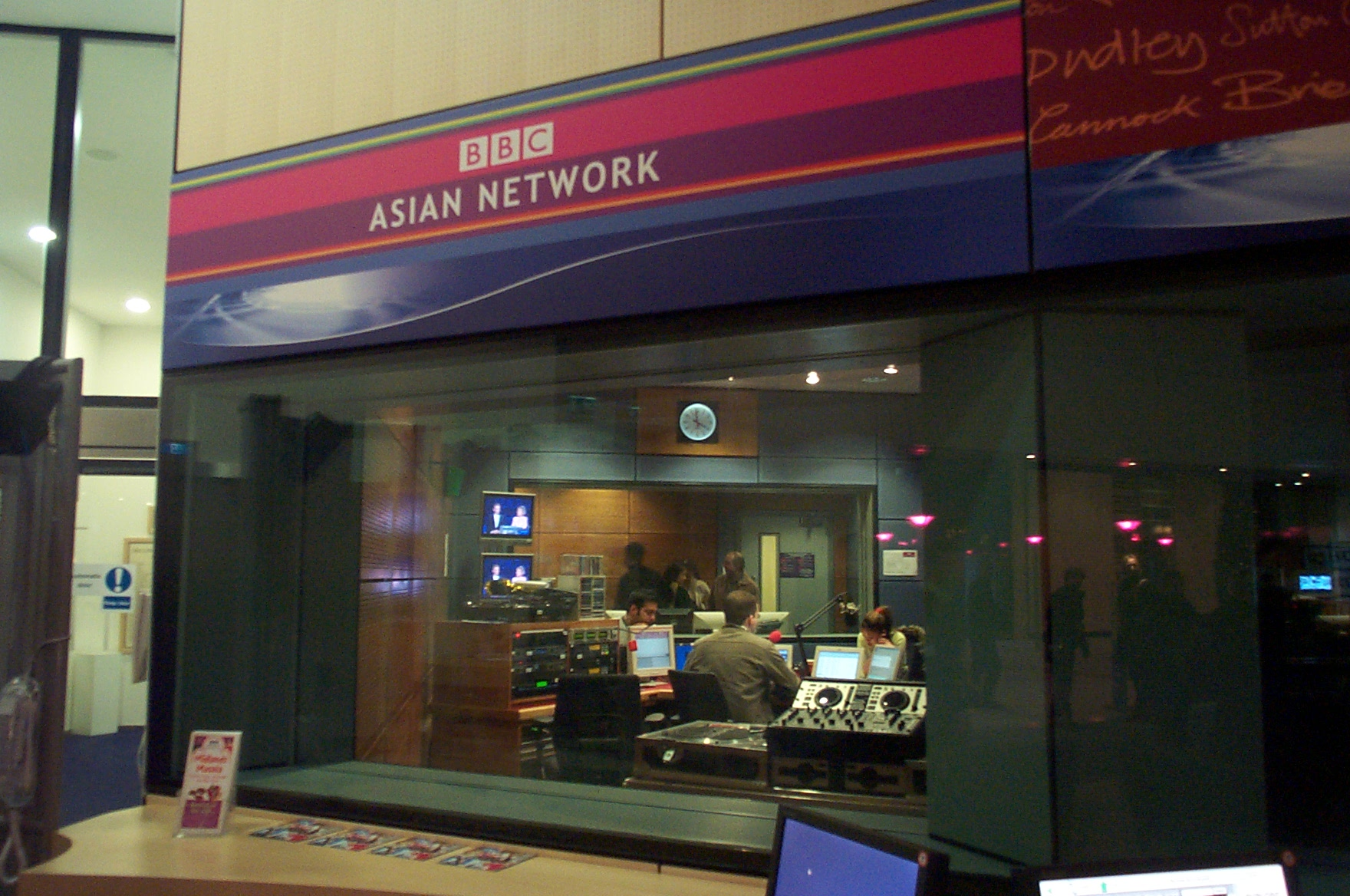
BBC Asian Network studio at The Mailbox shopping centre, Birmingham.

By 1949, the BBC had introduced their first weekly Bengali language programme, Anjuman, through the efforts of Nazir Ahmed and Nurul Momen. Momen also conducted a children's programme titled Kakoli. The BBC was later joined by more Bengalis such as Fateh Lohani and Fazle Lohani. BBC television had also broadcast an Asian news programme, Nai Zindagi Naya Jeevan, since 1968 from its studios in Birmingham; this series followed a traditional news and current affairs format.

In 1976, BBC Radio Leicester, responding to the growth of the size of the South Asian population and rising racial tension in Leicester, introduced a daily community show called Six Fifteen, aimed primarily at that community in the city. By 1977, CRE research showed that the programme regularly reached 67% of the South Asian community in Leicester. BBC Radio Leicester dominated the provision of Asian programming on BBC local radio and by 1990 was producing one third of the output. In 1989, BBC WM, the BBC radio station for the Midlands, followed Radio Leicester's lead and introduced a similar daily show as part of a new Midlands Asian Network.

On 30 October 1989, The Asian Network was launched on the medium wave transmitters of BBC WM and BBC Radio Leicester, with a combined output of 57 hours per week. This was extended to 86 hours a week in 1995 and on 4 November 1996 the station became a full-time service, on air for eighteen hours a day in Leicester and Birmingham, and was relaunched as the BBC Asian Network with programming also broadcast on the MW transmitters of stations with large Asian communities (with the exception of BBC GLR which was an FM-only station).

=== Station goes national ===
In November 1999, as part of the addition of a suite of BBC and commercial radio services to the Sky Digital satellite television platform, BBC Asian Network was made available to Sky viewers alongside BBC Radio 1, BBC Radio 2, BBC Radio 3, BBC Radio 4, BBC Radio 5 Live, BBC World Service, BBC Radio Scotland, BBC Radio Wales and BBC Radio Ulster.

On Monday 28 October 2002, it was relaunched for the DAB Digital Radio system, now broadcasting nationwide.

In January 2006, the BBC announced that they were investing an extra £1m in the BBC Asian Network, and increasing the number of full-time staff by 30% in a bid to make British South Asian interests "a mainstream part of the corporation's output".

=== 2006 branding and schedule changes ===
In April 2006, the first wave of schedule changes were introduced with further changes coming into effect on 14 May and 21 May, with weekend changes occurring from 17 June. In August 2007, the Asian Network received a new logo as part of a general re-brand of all national BBC stations. In 2009, this was rebranded again to add prominence to the Asian aspect of the logo.

=== Drama output until 2010 ===
One of the most significant programmes in the Asian Network line-up was an ongoing Asian soap opera Silver Street, which was first broadcast in 2004. Storylines focused on the lives of a British South Asian community in an unnamed English town, with themes that generally related to issues that affect the daily lives of British South Asians and their neighbours.

Following the reduction of episode lengths to five minutes per day and continued falling listenership, on 16 November 2009 the BBC announced they would be cancelling Silver Street. The last episode was broadcast in March 2010. The cancellation grew out of many criticisms of the Asian Network in the BBC Trust's Annual Report.

Silver Street was replaced by monthly half-hour dramas and in August 2010, BBC Asian Network announced it would be launching a new drama season from 1 September 2010.

=== 2020s ===
In March 2022, BBC Introducing on Asian Network with Jasmine Takhar was nominated for Best Radio Show at the Music Week Awards. It was the first Asian Network show with a Music Week Award nomination since the awards were launched. The show would be nominated again in 2023. The show also celebrated International Women's Day broadcasting from Maida Vale Studios.

In February 2023, the network launched their first tour with Nikita Kanda's breakfast show visiting Liverpool, Manchester and Glasgow.

BBC Asian Network were part of the BBC Introducing Showcase at the Great Escape Festival on Friday 12 May at the Paganini Ballroom in Brighton.

Breakfast show host Nikita Kanda took part in 21st series of Strictly Come Dancing where she was the second person voted out of the show.

In February 2024, BBC Introducing on Asian Network with Jasmine Takhar was nominated for best radio show at the Music Week Awards.

In February 2025, The Official British Asian Music Chart with Jasmine Takhar is nominated for best radio show at the Music Week Awards 10 months after the show launching.

On 1 September 2025, Jaz Singh, who achieved recognition for appearing in series two of The Traitors, permanently joined Asian Network to present its drive-time show after a successful stint covering its breakfast and Certified shows.

In February 2026, The Official British Asian Music Chart with Jasmine Takhar was nominated for best radio show at the Music Week Awards 2 years in a row.

=== 60 years of South Asian programmes (1965-2025) ===
In October 2025, the BBC aired a 2 hour long compilation of popular South Asian music including Bhangra, Folk songs and Bollywood from the past 60 years and also added/featured many classic South Asian programmes on iPlayer to celebrate 60 years of programmes on the BBC, starting with Make Yourself At Home (Apna Hi Ghar Samajhiye) (1965) and others like Madhur Jaffrey's Flavours of India (1995), Goodness Gracious Me (1998), Desi DNA (2004), Citizen Khan (2012) and others.

== Threat of closure and controversies ==
=== Threat of closure ===
On 26 February 2010 The Times reported that Mark Thompson, Director General of the BBC, proposed closing the station in a bid to scale back BBC operations and allow commercial rivals more room. The proposal of closure – along with BBC Radio 6 Music – was later confirmed on 2 March.

Listeners writing on the official Asian Network message boards advocated keeping their station at the expense of 6 Music, and letter was written to the BBC Trust and had been signed by people, with the actual number of signatories was artificially boosted with some signing their name more than once (as both a single name and as part of different collectives). The BBC Trust rejected plans to close 6 Music and later in 2011 rejected plans to close the Asian Network in favour of reducing its budget by 50%.

=== Sliding audiences and increasing costs ===
In July 2009 it was revealed that the Asian Network had lost over 20% of its listeners in a single year and, per listener, was the most costly and expensive BBC radio station to operate.

In 2011, the BBC ruled there would be a 46% reduction in the Asian Network's budget and a declared target of 600,000 listeners a week; with actual audience numbers only peaking at 507,000. In 2012, audience numbers fell even further; peaking at only 453,000. Even with the budget reductions, in 2013 the Asian Network had the largest budget of the BBC's digital-only radio stations at £13m; despite having the lowest audience figures by far.

RAJAR's figures in 2014 showed that the Asian Network had at last briefly met the target set four years earlier, finally peaking at 619,000 listeners in Q4. However, the Asian Network was noted as being the BBC's only station – across both television and radio – whose Appreciation Index measurably fell in 2014.

By May 2015, the Asian Network had once again lost a substantial number of listeners, with the RAJAR reporting a peak of just 562,000 listeners – a loss of 57,000 from the previous quarter.

In 2016–17, the Asian Network had the second highest cost-per-user of all the BBC's radio stations, at 3.4p per hour, the second highest budget of the BBC's digital-only radio stations at £7.5m and by far the lowest audience figures of all the BBC's stations.

In 2017/18, it was noted the station not only remained as having the highest cost-per-user of all the BBC radio output, but whose costs also increased – rising from 3.4p per hour the previous year to 3.7p per hour. The audience Appreciation Index figure did not increase, remaining at 80.3; and the average length of time spent on the channel dramatically fell from 06:11 to 05:19 – the biggest fall of all of the BBC's radio stations.

In 2018/19, the Asian Network's annual budget increased from £7m to £8m, but the station continued to perform poorly: population reach was down again to 1.1%, time spent on the channel per week fell again to 5:12 and an increase in cost per user per hour (up to 5p).

The station's poor performance continued into 2019/20, where it was noted time spent on the channel fell dramatically again by 20% to just 4:07, while the cost per use per hour had increased up to 6p, remaining the BBC's most expensive-per-listener station. Peak audience figures plunged down to 519,000 listeners, losing 13.8%.

In 2021/22, the stations audience reach fell to just 1% – the station continues to have by far the lowest audience figures and highest cost-per-user figures of all the BBC's stations.

In 2022/23, Asian Network's audience reach remained at just 1%.

=== Rotherham sex abuse scandal controversy ===
In 2018, the station's Head of News Arif Ansari was charged under the Sexual Offences (Amendment) Act 1992 after a reporter was thought to have named a victim of the Rotherham child sexual exploitation scandal during a live news bulletin. In January 2019, he was cleared when a judge ruled that Ansari was not at fault and had been incorrectly told the name of the victim was a pseudonym. He was the first BBC editor to be tried under the legislation.

== Presenters ==
=== Current presenters ===
- Jasmine Takhar
- Nikita Kanda
- Nayha Ahmad
- Nadia Ali
- DJ Limelight
- Kan D Man
- Jaz Singh
- Bobby Friction
- Panjabi Hit Squad
- DJ Kizzi
- Pritt
- Haroon Rashid
- Gagan Grewal
- Gura
- Smash Bengali
- AJD
- Dipps Bhamrah
- Mr O

=== Former presenters ===
- Guz Khan
- Nihal Arthanayake
- Nikki Bedi
- Ameet Chana
- Danny Choranji
- Sonia Deol
- Preeya Kalidas
- Harpz Kaur
- DJ Kayper
- Aasmah Mir
- Murtz
- Nerm
- Ashanti Omkar
- Raj and Pablo
- Pathaan
- Anita Rani
- Adil Ray
- Tommy Sandhu
- Nikesh Rughani
- Sunny and Shay
- Rozina Sini
- Yasser
