= South Asian diaspora =

Group of people

Total population
- Over 60 million (Note: Nearly 15 million Bangladeshis live outside Bangladesh.)

Regions with significant populations
- UAE: 6.2 million
- United States: 6.1 million
- Saudi Arabia: 6 million
- United Kingdom: 4 million
- Malaysia: 3.1 million
- Canada: 3 million
- Myanmar: 2.5 million
- South Africa: 2 million
- Australia: 1.2 million

Languages
- Bengali, Hindustani, Punjabi, Marathi, Maithili, Telugu, Tamil, Pashto, Saraiki, Hindko, Dari, Sinhalese, Nepali, (many more)

Religion
- Hinduism, Islam, Sikhism, Buddhism, Jainism, Zoroastrianism, Christianity, Judaism

The South Asian diaspora is the group of people whose ancestral origins lie in South Asia, but who live outside the region. With more than 44 million people within the cultural diaspora, it is one of the largest in the world. The term encompasses all whose ancestral and cultural origins lie in the modern nations of India, Bangladesh, Sri Lanka, Bhutan, the Maldives, and Nepal, with Pakistan and Afghanistan often included. The diaspora is considered a distinct ethnic group by many nations’ censuses, with it having the largest number of immigrants in the world.

== Endonyms ==
South Asians in the diaspora are often referred to as Desis (Hindustani: देसी), a term embraced by many South Asians, though controversial to some. The term is used frequently by South Asian immigrants for native cuisine, lifestyle, clothing, and more.

== History ==
=== Ancient era ===
Some South Asians lived in other parts of the world for trade purposes. During the Roman Empire, a few South Asians came to Europe. Additionally, there is evidence of contact between the ancient Greeks and South Asian civilisations, with some even having been suggested to have adopted a form of Greco-Buddhism.

As for the Roman Empire, many civilisations such as the Chera, Gupta, Kushan and Pandya empires are documented to have interacted and proceeded in commercial trade with the West, particularly through the Silk Road in the north, as written by Pliny the Elder, Ptolemy and Strabo.

=== Medieval era ===
==== Romani people ====
The Romani, also spelled Romany or Rromani ( or ), colloquially known as the Roma (: Rom), are an Indo-Aryan ethnic group who traditionally led a nomadic, itinerant lifestyle. Linguistic and genetic evidence suggests that the Romani originated in northwestern regions of the Indian subcontinent. Their subsequent westward migration, possibly in waves, is now believed by historians to have occurred around 1000 CE. Their original name, derived from the Sanskrit (), may refer to the Doma, a Dalit caste traditionally associated with musicians and dancers. The Romani population moved west into the Ghaznavid Empire and later into the Byzantine Empire. The Romani arrived in Europe around the 13th to 14th century, via the Balkans. Although they are dispersed, their most concentrated populations are in Europe, especially Central, Eastern, and Southern Europe, as well as West Asia (mainly Turkey and Iran).

=== Colonial era ===
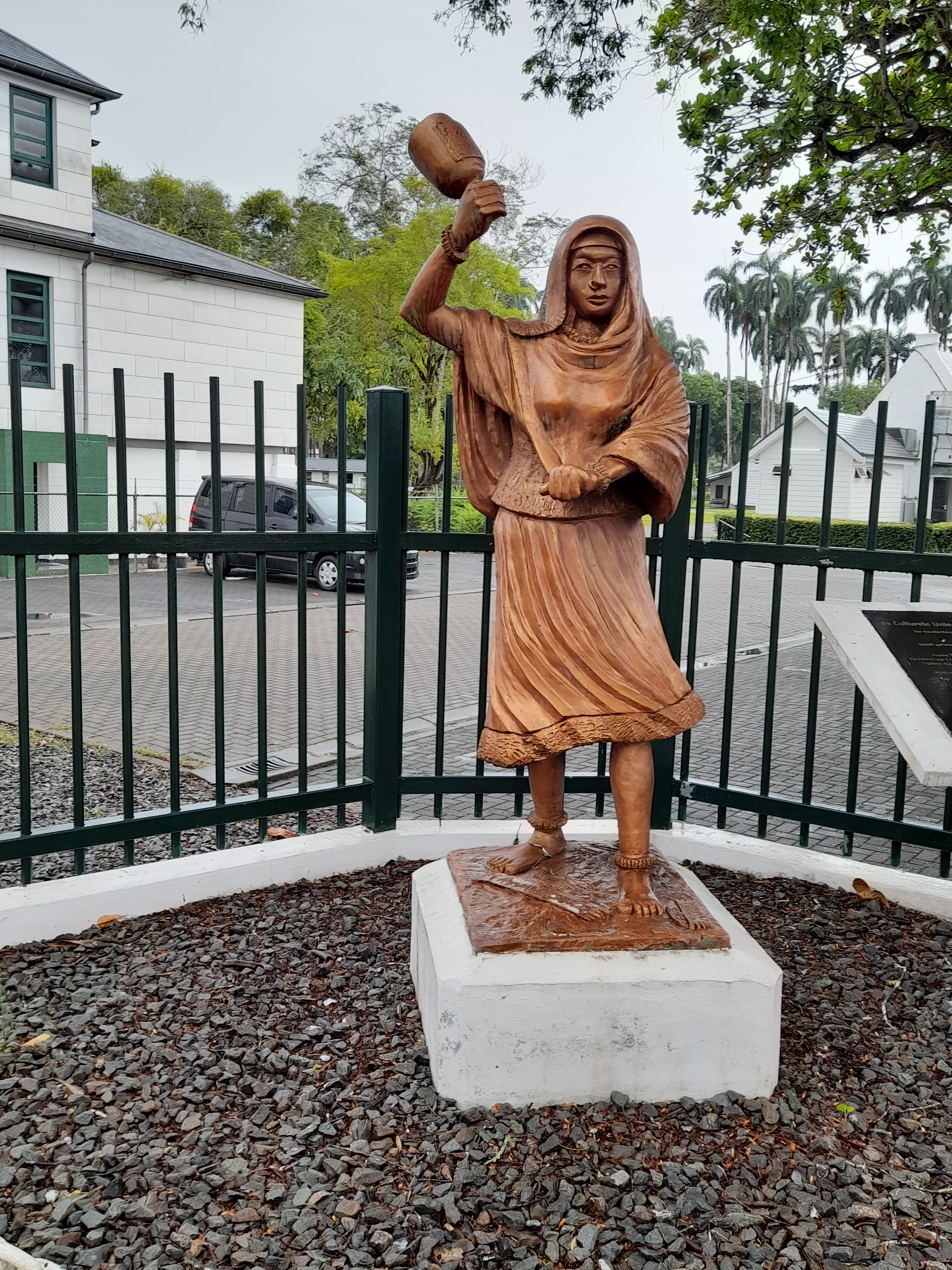
A statue commemorating Janey Tetary, an Indian indentured servant who died in an 1884 uprising in Suriname

During the colonial era, over 1 million South Asians were taken to other parts of the world as indentured servants, to places such as Fiji, Guyana, and parts of the Caribbean. These immigrants formed the first large-scale South Asian diaspora community. For example, by 1946, the diaspora in Fiji accounted for 46% of the population. They formed unique dialects such as Fiji Hindustani and Caribbean Hindustani, with members of the diaspora rising to nationally significant roles. South Asians also were brought to parts of Southeast Asia as part of the British Empire.

Diaspora members played a significant role in opposing the British Raj as part of the Ghadar Movement, with many supporters of the movement fleeing the British Raj in favour of other nations, such as in North America, to continue Indian independence activism and the Ghadar Movement. At many times, these immigrants were returned to the British Raj, where they were often tried and imprisoned.

Some South Asians, mainly from Punjab, migrated to the West Coast in the United States, and mixed with the local Mexican community, whilst others moved to Canada, establishing a prominent South Asian diaspora in North America.

=== Contemporary era ===
South Asians have emigrated in record numbers since the end of the colonial era in the middle of the 20th century. Many South Asians migrated to the United Kingdom and participated in its post-war economic recovery. Some South Asians went to the Middle East for labour opportunities, though some were mistreated in a racist manner and exploited. After the Immigration and Nationality Act of 1965 that allowed nonwhite immigration was passed, Indian-Americans became the richest ethnic group in the United States, and comprise over 10% of the labour force in computing-related fields (see also: Deportation of Indian nationals under Donald Trump). Additionally, the group has in the contemporary era led to the creation of a unique Desi culture amongst members of the diaspora, with the creation of Little South Asias across the world, along with the election of diaspora members to important political and business roles.

Because South Asians had already dispersed across the world during the colonial era, a noted aspect of the diaspora is that it has produced several secondary diasporas - some of its members' families transited through several countries over generations to reach a final destination (e.g. a person's ancestors may have come from India to Africa, and then a few generations later from Africa to New Zealand).

== Culture ==
=== Cinema ===
Some people in the diaspora watch South Asian cinema (mainly Bollywood), and some South Asian films feature diaspora characters. The Hindustani-language Bollywood industry has played a significant role in uniting the diaspora around Hindi as a common language for exploring its South Asian heritage. The diaspora's proficiency in English has also led to South Asian media catering to them using Hinglish, a hybrid of Hindi and English.

=== Sport ===
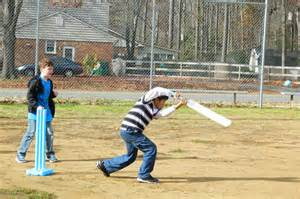
A member of the diaspora playing cricket in Virginia, America.

In general, South Asians have a complicated relationship to sport, as it can allow for cultural continuity in certain ways but can be used in other ways to disrupt negative social and physical perceptions of the diaspora.

South Asians introduced some of their traditional games, such as kabaddi and kho-kho, into countries like South Africa and Malaysia during the colonial era. In post-colonial times, kabaddi and kho-kho have been brought by the diaspora to some of the Western countries, with kabaddi used in some contexts to show masculinity in hostile environments.

Cricket, a popular sport in South Asia, has been patronised by the diaspora in North America and the Middle East, with the American Major League Cricket mainly targeting the diaspora audience. The sport has grown in Europe since the 2015 refugee crisis.

=== Desi pubs ===
A Desi pub is a British pub owned or managed by a landlord of Indian origin. They generally serve Punjabi food while maintaining traditional British pub elements, such as ale and pub games. The term "Desi" comes from Hindustani, and is derived from the Sanskrit word for "land" or "country". Desi pubs originated during the 1960s following migration from the Indian subcontinent to the UK. They have been cited as a successful example of cultural integration between Asian and British communities.

== Community relations ==
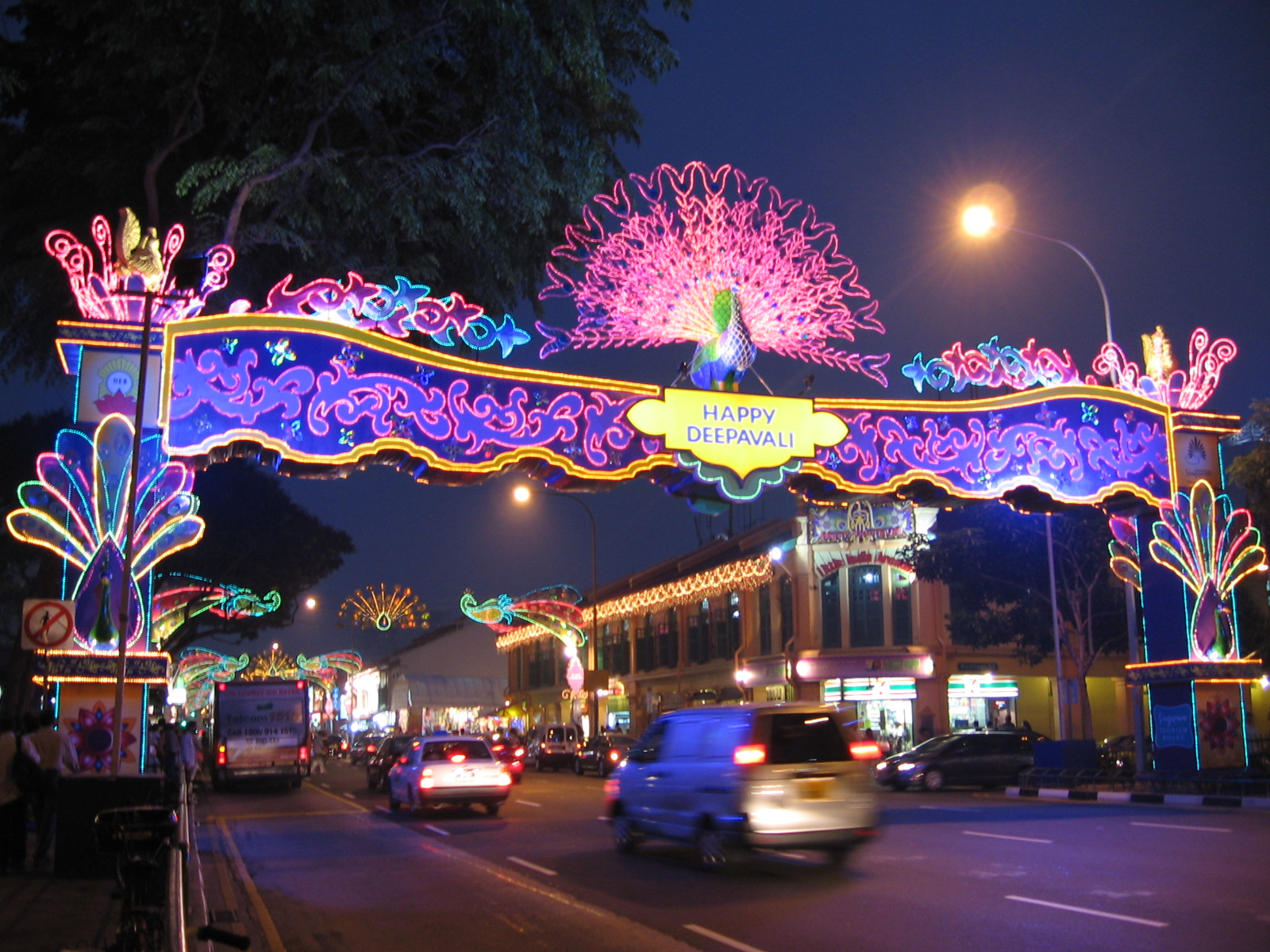
Deepavali (Diwali) celebrated in Little India, Singapore.

=== Within the diaspora ===
South Asian diasporas represent a wide variety of linguistic, cultural, ethnic, and religious groups from across the subcontinent. There are sometimes tensions between these different groups within the diaspora. For example, the Hindu-Muslim tensions created by the 1947 Partition of India sometimes manifest themselves in divisions among Hindus and Muslims in the diaspora, particularly between those of Indian descent and those of Pakistani or Bangladeshi descent. These tensions have been noted more frequently among the diaspora in the United Kingdom since incidents such as the Babri Masjid demolition and the 2014 election of the Hindu nationalist Bharatiya Janata Party (BJP) in India.

Discrimination based on the caste system occurs to some extent primarily within the Indian diaspora; in America, a non-scientific survey showed 67% of lower-caste Dalits had experienced caste discrimination in the workplace, and in California, there was heated debate within the diaspora as to whether to pass legislation explicitly banning caste discrimination.

=== The diaspora and South Asia ===
Diaspora communities have been noted for providing crucial economic support and remittances to countries within South Asia. India has issued diaspora bonds in certain crisis situations, such as the 1991 Indian economic crisis, and has given increasing priority to involving its diaspora. Diaspora graduates from MIT played a significant role in establishing the Indian Institutes of Technology.

Tensions have occurred between South Asian countries and their diasporas over support for separatist movements, as in the case of India and its Punjabi diaspora over the Khalistan movement. These tensions have sometimes boiled over to harming relations between South Asian countries and the host countries of the diaspora, as with the 2023 Canada-India diplomatic row.

=== The diaspora and its host countries ===
The Hindu diaspora has come under some scrutiny in its host countries for playing an increasingly significant role in promoting Hindu nationalism, with some diaspora members disapproving of the scrutiny and opposing Hindu nationalism.

Some Punjabis have joined organized crime gangs in recent decades in Canada.

== In popular culture ==
=== North America ===
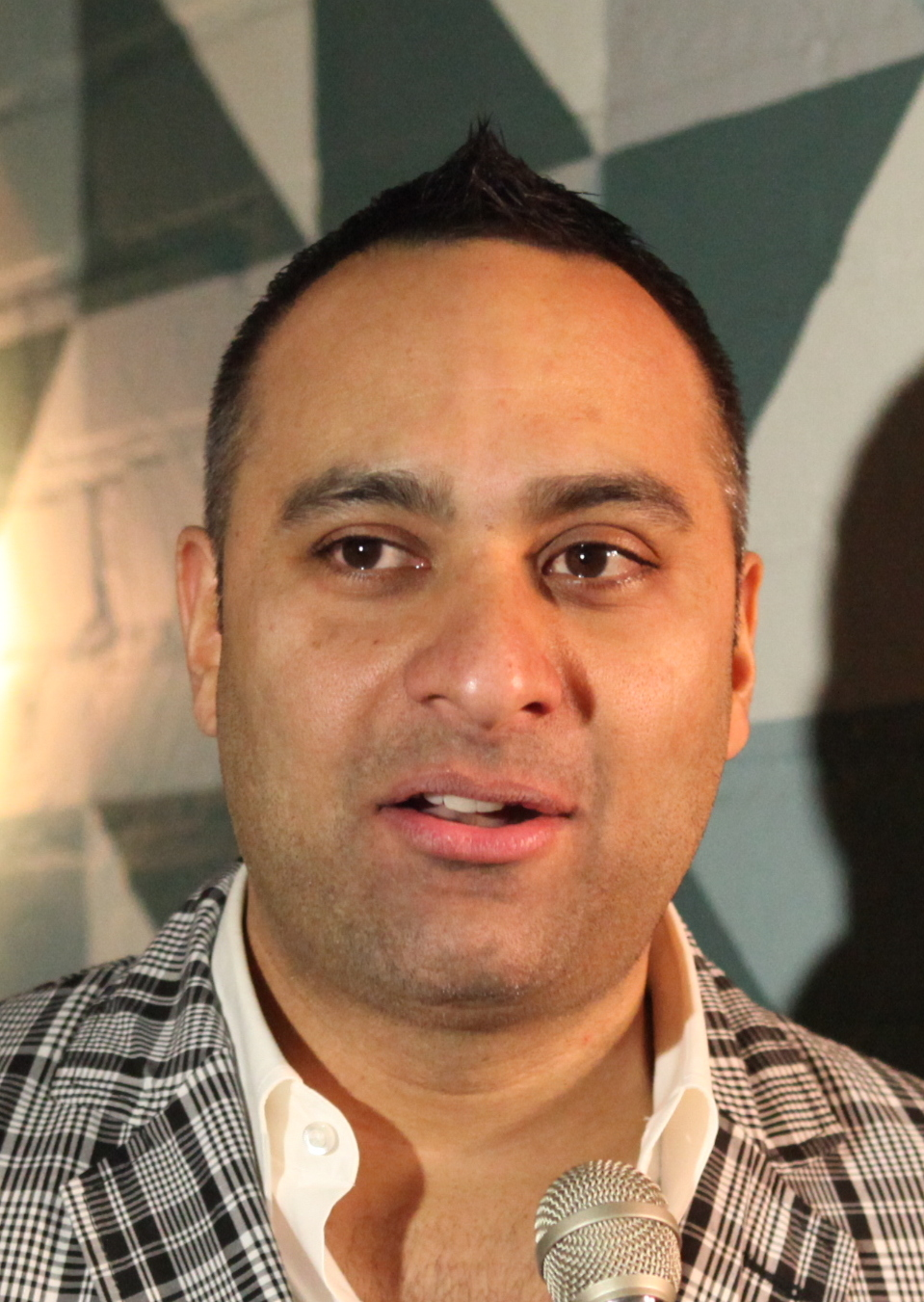
Russell Peters, a famous Indo-Canadian comedian.

In the United States, representation of the South Asian diaspora has steadily increased; in previous decades, Apu of The Simpsons had been the most prominent South Asian representation, but now there is significantly more varied representation, with comedians like Hasan Minhaj achieving success.

=== Video games ===
Venba is a video game that depicts themes of Tamil-Canadian immigration by exploring Tamil cuisine.

Thirsty Suitors explores romantic relationships involving a South Asian-American protagonist.

== Groups ==
=== Diaspora by host country ===
- British South Asians
- Dutch South Asians
- Irish South Asians
- South Asian Americans
- South Asian Canadians
  - South Asians Canadians in Vancouver
  - South Asian Canadians in British Columbia
  - South Asian Canadians in the Greater Toronto Area
- South Asians in Hong Kong

==== Secondary diasporas ====
- Indo-Caribbean diaspora
- Indo-Fijian diaspora

=== Diaspora by origin country ===
- Afghan diaspora
- Bangladeshi diaspora
- Indian diaspora
- Maldivian diaspora
- Nepalese diaspora
- Pakistani diaspora
- Sri Lankan diaspora

== See also ==
- Indian Arrival Day, commemorating the arrival of indentured labourers
- Commonwealth diaspora, including other groups of former British subjects
