= Sona Family =

UK musical group

- Origin: London
- Genres: Bhangra, Hip-hop
- Years active: 2002-present
- Label: Family Business / Sony BMG
- Members: Harry Sona, Mr Riz, Kazz, DJ JC
- Past members: Usmaan, Jamal Cooke, Hard Kaur
- Website: www.sonafamily.com

Sona Family is a London-based musical quartet. They have been said to sound "like The Black Eyed Peas infused with traditional Indian bhangra music". They combine urban music, hip hop, R&B and dancehall with their own upbringing as UK Desis. Headed by producer/writer Harry Sona, Sona Family consists of rapper/singer/producer Mr Riz, female singer/rapper Kazz & DJ/producer JC.

== History ==
Originally started by Harry Sona, his cousin Usmaan and DJ JC, they surfaced on the Urban Asian music scene in 2002 with their Sona Kaandaan mixtape which was highlighted by a remix of the More Fire Crew's garage anthem "Oi". The remix titled "Oi Who's That Asian Girl" gave the group mainstream attention and airplay on major radio shows including BBC Radio 1's Bobby Friction & Nihal, DJ Luck & MC Neat on Kiss 100 and Mastersteps show on Choice FM. They were pioneers as a desi hip-hop group. They went on to become the first ever desi rap-group to be signed to Sony BMG, through which they released their only official album to date called Make Some Noise in 2007.

Sona Family also released a controversial track by the name of "Hai Kuthi" which featured members rapping about a real life conflict between JC and a person from his hometown by the name of Jaspal Sanghera who referred to himself as 'Don'. The song contained profanity in English, Punjabi and Hindi, but was considered a huge online hit due to the original and upfront lyrics. Their breakthrough came with the song "Ek Glassy".

In 2003, the group's success continued with hits "Indian Style", "Bang Boogie" and "Hey Hey". The group reached an incredible milestone when tracks were highlighted on an Asian Rap special on famed Tim Westwood's Radio 1 Rap Show.

The derivation of their name is from Hindi. Sona means "Gold" in Urdu while Family is a popular term used throughout hip hop as the idea of a crew, squad or clique but also relating to the Asian idea of the family foundation.

Their song, "Ek Glassy", appeared in the 2017 feature film Finding Fatimah.

== Discography ==
- Family Hustle, The Mixtape (2004)
- Make Some Noise (2007)
