= Indian School (TV series) =

- Created by: BBC, Open University
- Narrated by: Nikki Bedi
- Opening theme: Hamara Bharat
- Countries of origin: United Kingdom, India
- Original language: English
- No. of episodes: 10

Production
- Executive producer: Colin Cameron
- Production locations: Pune, India

Original release
- Release: 16 May – 25 July 2007

Indian School is a BBC documentary series narrated by Nikki Bedi and produced by Colin Cameron. It was first transmitted in the United Kingdom from 16 May 2007.

The series was co-produced with Open University.

== Episodes ==
Episode	Title	synopsis
1/10	New Boy	14-year-old Ashutosh's education has taken second place to his father's career for as long as he can remember. While Ashutosh tries to settle into yet another school, the prefect election gets under way and the most popular kids fight it out to be Head Boy.
2/10	Transcendental Education	9-year-old Rahul is the naughtiest boy in his class, while Barbet's class is running out of control without a class teacher. Meditation and yoga are used to bring these two classroom situations under control.
3/10	Cyber Genius	The philosophy at Bojwani Academy is that self-knowledge is the key to personal development - an emphasis seemingly at odds with the new mantra of materialism in Pune.
4/10	Hinglish	Head boy Prem takes on the creme de la creme of the city's private schools in a debating competition.
5/10	Girl Talk	At Kalmadi High School, 25-year-old counsellor Sonal has decided it's time to settle down and opt for an arranged marriage. In the meantime she's faced with teaching the facts of life to a hundred fresh-faced 13-year-olds.
6/10	Spiritual Journey	The end of the monsoon season signifies festival time in India. As the first term draws to a close, the students of the two schools are preparing to celebrate the biggest Hindu festival of the year, Diwali. While the younger children celebrate with fancy dress and a mela, the senior students head out of town on a school trip they'll never forget.
7/10	Type Caste	In a look at how the ancient caste system still affects the lives of schoolchildren in India today, this edition focuses on Meghna, an ambitious high caste girl who bitterly resents the policy, and Rohit a shy, bullied, low caste boy who is benefiting from it.
8/10	East Meets West	Exposure to western music and the internet is changing teenage tastes, and 14-year-old Viraj has just had a big break by landing a role in a Bollywood blockbuster. But classical singer Varsha and dancer Jenny are passionate about India's traditions and they're on a mission to save their culture.
9/10	Howzat	Every little boy in India dreams of becoming a cricketer, but there are over a hundred million schoolboys and just 11 places on the national team. Ishwar and Rohit are pursuing the same cricketing dreams, but while Ishwar is part of India's booming middle classes, Rohit lives in a city slum. Can the national obsession of India transcend social divides?
10/10	Exam Fever	Good exam results offer a wealth of opportunity in a rapidly emerging economic power such as India. Over a million and a half students sit their final school exams in the state of Maharashtra alone, and competition is fierce. Head Girl Vallarie contemplates life after school, while busy Parth struggles with parental pressure and eight-year-old Devika sits her first exam. How will the students cope with exam fever?
