= Murtz =

British television and radio presenter

Murtaza Ali, better known as Murtz, is a British television and radio presenter.

After a long-running television series Mutz Cutz with the UK's largest Indian Satellite channel Zee TV, Murtz became a recognised personality with a cult following among British Asian families across the UK and Europe. As of 2009 he is married to British Asian model and television presenter Gulzaeb Beg Ali.

== Early life ==
Born and brought up in Harrow to Pakistani parents, Murtz started out pursuing an interest in dancing whilst studying business management at the University of Westminster in 1999. He performed to audiences of over 10,000 people with the some of top Bollywood choreographers and actors including Anil Kapoor, Akshay Kumar, Karishma Kapoor, Mahima Choudry, Sunil Shetty and Gulshan Grover to mention a few. At the same time he was asked to model for many of the large UK Asian fashion houses and was also featured in several print advertising campaigns for mainstream clients including British Telecom and a television commercial for Champion Atta.

In 2000 Murtz moved on from dancing to presenting events as a host/compere for University of London Asian Society shows. In the same year he was head-hunted by television networks and at the age of 20 was signed-up as the newest resident presenter or VJ for Zee TV with his own TV show.

== Television ==
=== Zee TV and Zee Muzic ===
==== Sorted ====
Sorted was Murtz's first on show with Zee and radically different to other conventional shows targeting British Asian television audiences. In every weekly edition of Sorted, Murtz would take his viewers on a trip into the crazy Asian party scene in London and across the UK, speaking to revellers getting their thoughts on a host of subjects and topics - all this as they partied on the dance floor, whilst trying to hide away from the camera, (so their folks at home wouldn't find out!).

The show was hugely successful establishing Murtz as a broadcaster, journalist and creative director. Popularity of ‘Sorted’ even caught the attention of mainstream media with Murtz being featured in the Channel 4 documentary Culture Clash. He was interviewed by the late veteran broadcaster Sir Charles Wheeler to get his insight on the impact of 9/11 on British Muslims.

After 18 months and recording over 100 non-stop editions of Sorted, Murtz left the programme to focus on completing his degree.

==== Mutz Cutz ====
Graduating from university in 2002 and to much popular demand, Murtz re-joined Zee TV to focus on new a studio based show. To acknowledge Murtz's success, Zee Muzic labelled him as their UK brand ambassador by naming his next show after him, with Mutz Cutz being born and first airing on Zee Muzic in October 2002.

The programme requirement was to play viewers video requests and read out their email messages. Murtz took this basic format and transformed his half-hour of air-time into the staple viewing diet of British Asian audiences across the UK and Europe by incorporating his unique personality, style, jokes and personal experiences into the show. Within 6 months Zee commissioned an extra weekly slot Mutz Cutz Pluz to cater for their viewers need to see more Murtz on their screens, and the programme aired non-stop without break for 7 years.

In 2005, Murtz was awarded the Eastern Eye Newspaper Award for Best Presenter - after which he introduced viewers to his old dancing partner and friend, Madhu Singh - who was to be only heard, but never seen on the show!

Murtz's popularity grew still, with him becoming an icon and role model to British Asians and a loved personality in Asian homes across Europe. Mutz Cutz became an advice show with viewers of all ages asking him for his opinion on general issues concerning their lives.

=== BBC Asian Programmes Unit ===
==== BBC Two: Desi DNA - Extreme Bodies ====
In 2007 Murtz presented the Extreme Bodies story on BBC Two for the 4th series of the British Asian Arts and Lifestyle show Desi DNA. In the programme Murtz interviewed three people who had taken the idea of looking good and twisted it into an art form, using their bodies as the canvas to pierce, paint, sculpt and scar.

== Radio ==
=== BBA Online and Urban Sound Radio ===
Murtz began his radio career in 2003 presenting several shows for internet radio station BBA Online. In early 2004, went on to host the internet station's local sister FM radio station Urban Sound breakfast show.

=== BBC Asian Network ===
In 2006 Murtz officially joined the BBC Asian Network as a presenter after several stints of filling for Ameet Channa, to host their weekly two-hour Bollywood chart show, Sunday Soundtrack. In 2006, Murtz was then selected to be one of the presenters for the Asian Network's flagship four-hour Bollywood programme Love Bollywood. It was in 2008, Murtz was promoted to present his own three-hour weekly request show. As of 2012 the show is now two hours. Since 2015, his show has been replaced with a show hosted by Preeya Kalidas.

=== Voice over ===
Being bilingual in English and his mother tongue of Urdu, in 2007 Murtz recorded the BBC World CBeebies advertising campaign which aired in India.
