= Desi DNA =

British television show

- Country of origin: United Kingdom

Original release
- Network: BBC Two
- Release: 2003

Desi DNA is a British television show on the BBC covering Desi (North Indian) art, culture and entertainment that launched in 2003.

In 2004, Desi DNA received the Best Lifestyle Programme award from the Royal Television Society.

The show was broadcast on BBC Two and was co-presented by Adil Ray, Anita Rani and Nihal Arthanyake with additional contributions by Nikki Bedi, Sonia Deol, Bobby Friction, Murtz and a number of other presenters. Waheed Khan, Irshad Ashraf and Sangeeta Sehdev have all been directors on the show.
