= Nihal Arthanayake =

British radio and television presenter (born 1971)

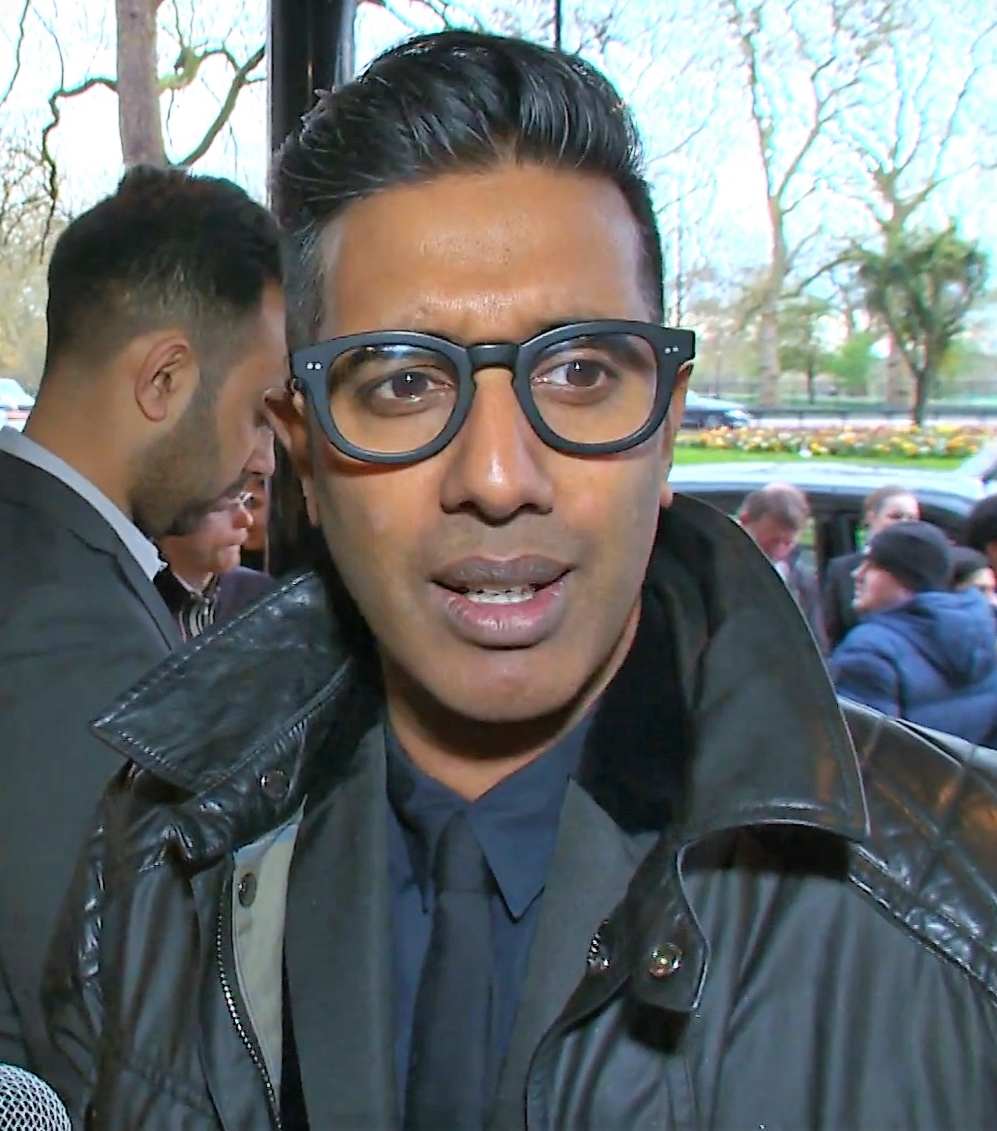
- DJ Nihal at The Asian Awards in 2014
- Born: Nihal Arthanayake; 1 June 1971 (age 54); Harlow, Essex, England
- Occupations: DJ, radio and television presenter
- Spouse: Eesha Arthanayake
- Children: 2

Nihal Arthanayake (born 1 June 1971) is a British radio and TV presenter.

== Early life ==
Nihal Arthanayake was born on 1 June 1971, to Theravada Buddhist Sri Lankan parents. Nihal began his involvement in the music industry as a promoter of rap shows in his native Essex, while he was studying at Burnt Mill School, in Harlow, Essex.

== Music career ==
=== Performing ===
Nihal began a career as a rap recording artist performing as 'MC Krayzee A'. In 1988 he released the track 'Into The Music' on the British Hip Hop compilation 'Hard Core One' on BPM Records. In 1995, Nihal was a member of the group 'The Muddie Funksters' and released the 4-track EP 'Brown Like Muddie' on Go! Discs Records and the 7" flexi disc single 'I'm The M The B The S The T' for Hip Hop Connection Magazine. He was also briefly a member of alternative hip hop outfit Collapsed Lung and worked with Fun Da Mental and Punjabi MC, Badmarsh & Shri, Mentor, Sona Family and DJ Sanj.

=== Promotion ===
In the late 1990s Arthanayake turned to music promotion working for artists as diverse as Nitin Sawhney, Judge Jules, Mos Def and Elton John and it was while working for the groundbreaking Asian Beats record label Outcaste Records he promoted, amongst others Badmarsh & Shri's Signs album.

=== Writing ===
Arthanayake has worked as a freelance music journalist, writing for Asiana, Eastern Eye, The Face, Mixmag, Hip Hop Connection, Attitude, Bear magazine, Cage And Aviary Birds and The Observer.

== Radio career ==
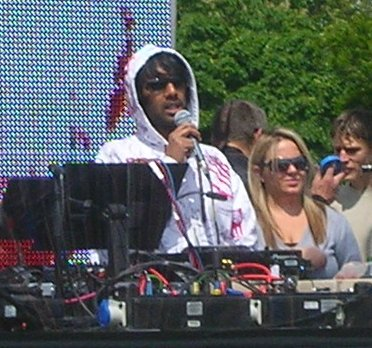
Nihal at Radio 1's Big Weekend 2007 in Preston

Arthanayake joined BBC Radio 1 in 2002, to become co-host of a night time Asian Beats show with DJ Bobby Friction coming under the specialist DJ category. The show won a Sony Radio Award in 2003 – achieving Gold standard in the Specialist Music Category for their show Bobby Friction & Nihal Present. At the end of 2004, they released a compilation album as a reflection of the music they play on the show. After an initial high-profile start, the show was rescheduled to the early morning 'graveyard' hours. Eventually Bobby Friction left the show, leaving the title as "Asian Beats with Nihal".

In October 2007 Arthanayake became the presenter of the Weekend Breakfast Show on Radio 1; he was one of only two DJs to present both a mainstream and a specialist show on the channel, the other being Annie Mac. He also provided holiday cover for Radio 1 colleagues. In September 2008 he was moved from weekend breakfast to weekend afternoons 13.00-16.00 on Radio 1. On 21 September 2009, Arthanayake was moved from weekends to a brand-new review programme, named BBC Radio 1's Review With Nihal. The weekly show reviews the latest music. He also became the sole presenter of the specialist Radio 1 Asian Beats show after Bobby Friction left.

In May 2007, Arthanayake left Kicking Off... to become the host of the daily phone-in talk show from 09.00 to 12.00 on the Asian Network. In April 2009 his show moved to 13.00-15.00 as part of schedule changes. In late 2012 the show moved to 10.00-13.00.

In 2010, he won "Best Radio Show" at the UK Asian Music Awards (UK AMAs) for his show on Radio 1, and a Sony Award for Best Speech Programme for his Asian Network show.

In June 2014, it was announced that in September 2014, Arthanayake would leave BBC Radio 1.

Until September 2016 Arthanayake had his own discussion programme concerned with societal and political topics at BBC Radio A (Asian Network) Channel: Nihal. Discussion and debate on the big issues..

In September 2016 Nihal joined BBC Radio 5 Live co-hosting the "Afternoon Edition" show with Sarah Brett. After Sarah Brett left the show it was renamed Nihal Arthanayake; it was broadcast Monday-Thursday 1pm-4pm.

He left the weekday afternoon show in June 2024, and now hosts two interviews on Sunday evenings in a slot called Headliners with Nihal Arthanayake, which is also available as a podcast. He also occasionally presents Loose Ends on BBC Radio 4.

== Television ==
Arthanayake's TV appearances began in 1999 alongside Emma B on BBC2's Webwise. He also hosted his own rap show The Drop on MTV Base, and three hours of live TV every Saturday for digital television channel CBBC entitled The Saturday Show: Extra.

Arthanayake co-presented three series of BBC2's Asian music arts and culture show – Desi DNA alongside Adil Ray and Anita Rani since 2004 and he interviewed Karsh Kale, Padma Lakshmi, Nerm, Outlandish and DJ Pathaan, as well as presenting special features on Jay Sean, Ms Scandalous and Freeform Five.

In November 2004, he presented Channel 4 documentary Where's Your F*****G Manners? In August 2005, he appeared on BBC2's Art School, alongside Ulrika Jonsson and Keith Allen, spending two weeks at the Chelsea School of Art and learn about modern art.

In 2010, Nihal appeared on BBC2's Celebrity Masterchef, but did not get past the first round, after cooking a Thai chicken curry on rosti for the Invention Test.

With inside knowledge of the music industry he has contributed commentary on various music and culture-related topics on programmes ranging from the BRIT Awards, The Culture Show and Channel 5's The Wright Stuff, to MTV Base's Hip Hop Candy, and has appeared as a guest panellist on music comedy quiz Never Mind the Buzzcocks and on BBC Four's We Need Answers.

In March 2021, Nihal appeared on Richard Osman's House of Games on the BBC. In July/August 2021, he was part of the BBC's coverage team for the Tokyo 2020 Olympic Games, broadcasting a nightly highlights show with Jeanette Kwakye and short explainers from Tokyo about how some of the less well-known sports work.

== Club promotion ==
Following the success of the Radio 1 show, Arthanayake launched his own club night called Bombay Bronx in May 2004 as an opportunity to showcase his love of rap music – but with a distinctly Asian perspective. Since its creation, Bombay Bronx has seen some of the biggest artists on the 'Asian Beats' scene perform live, such as Swami, Raghav, Jay Sean, Belgian Ben, Skiddy McGee and Mentor Kolektiv, as well as giving a platform for unsigned artists such as Sunit, Raxtstar and Serese.

As well as DJ-ing at a variety of events up and down the country, Nihal has DJ-ed the Isle of Wight Festival, Glastonbury Festival and Bestival in the UK. Internationally, he has performed in Bangladesh, Dubai, Germany, India, Sri Lanka, Switzerland, Thailand and toured the U.S. with Bobby Friction and Raghav.

== Other projects ==
In 2005, Nihal and former colleague Bobby Friction represented London as members of a team of cultural ambassadors during the successful 2012 Summer Olympics London bid.

He is the voiceover for the Slumdog Millionaire album.

Nihal also appeared on the BBC Radio 5 Live show Fighting Talk on 1 May 2010 alongside Tom Watt, John Rawling and Kevin Bridges. Here he showed his support for north London football club Tottenham Hotspur.

Additionally, Nihal was responsible for the music accompanying the London New Year's Eve fireworks display for 2011 and 2012.

== Comments on BBC diversity ==
In November 2023, while speaking at a journalism diversity conference in UK, Arthanayake stated that working within an "overwhelmingly white" environment at the BBC depressed him and affected his mental health due to the lack of diversity. He went on to say "It's really affecting me that I walk in and all I see is white people".

== Personal life ==
Arthanayake used to live in the Dollis Hill area of London. He moved to Stockport, Greater Manchester in 2016 when he joined BBC Five Live. He lives there with his wife Eesha, and their two children, one son and one daughter. He has a BA (2:1) from St Mary's University, Twickenham in History and English Literature and in 2023 was also awarded an Honorary Doctorate in Communications.

Arthanayake is a fan of Tottenham Hotspur.
