= Glassy Junction =

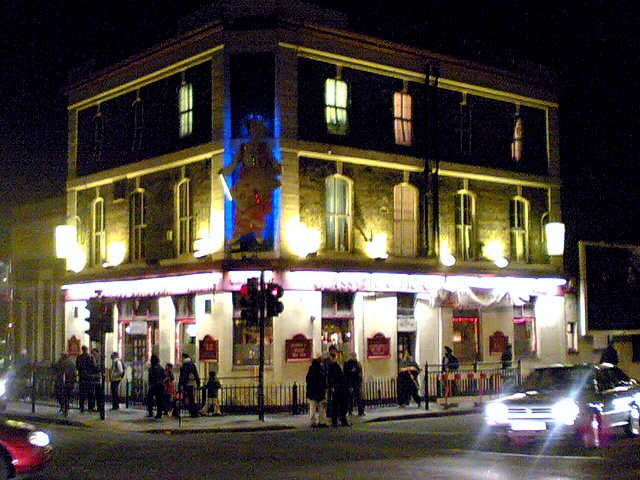
Glassy Junction in Southall, England

A Glassy Junction; Punjabi: ਗਲਾਸੀ ਜੰਕਸ਼ਨ literally means the junction of drinks (glassy). This is a Punjabi term referring to "pub" and is used in the Doaba region. It’s a registered name in India, Europe and America. All such Pubs (Glassy Junctions) are owned by Punjabi people as the name has significance to the Punjabi people. The Punjabi touch of the name is due to word 'Glassy' which is a small strong 'Peg', noted in Punjabi songs of Balwinder Safri and A. S. Kang.

The pub in Southall was closed down prior to 2012 after being open since 1994. It was situated opposite the Sikh Gurdwara which was a bone of contention to the Sikh Community.

There are many Glassy Junction franchises in cities around the world, including Jallandhar, Southall and Surrey.

Glassy Junctions all over have Punjabi interiors and arrangements. Another thing in common is their Punjabi Peg and Patiala peg which is specially produced and served. Some pubs serve Punjabi non-vegetarian food, with the U.K. Glassy Junction in JALANDHAR and Southall possessing restaurant provisions.
