= Bobby Friction =

British DJ (born 1971)

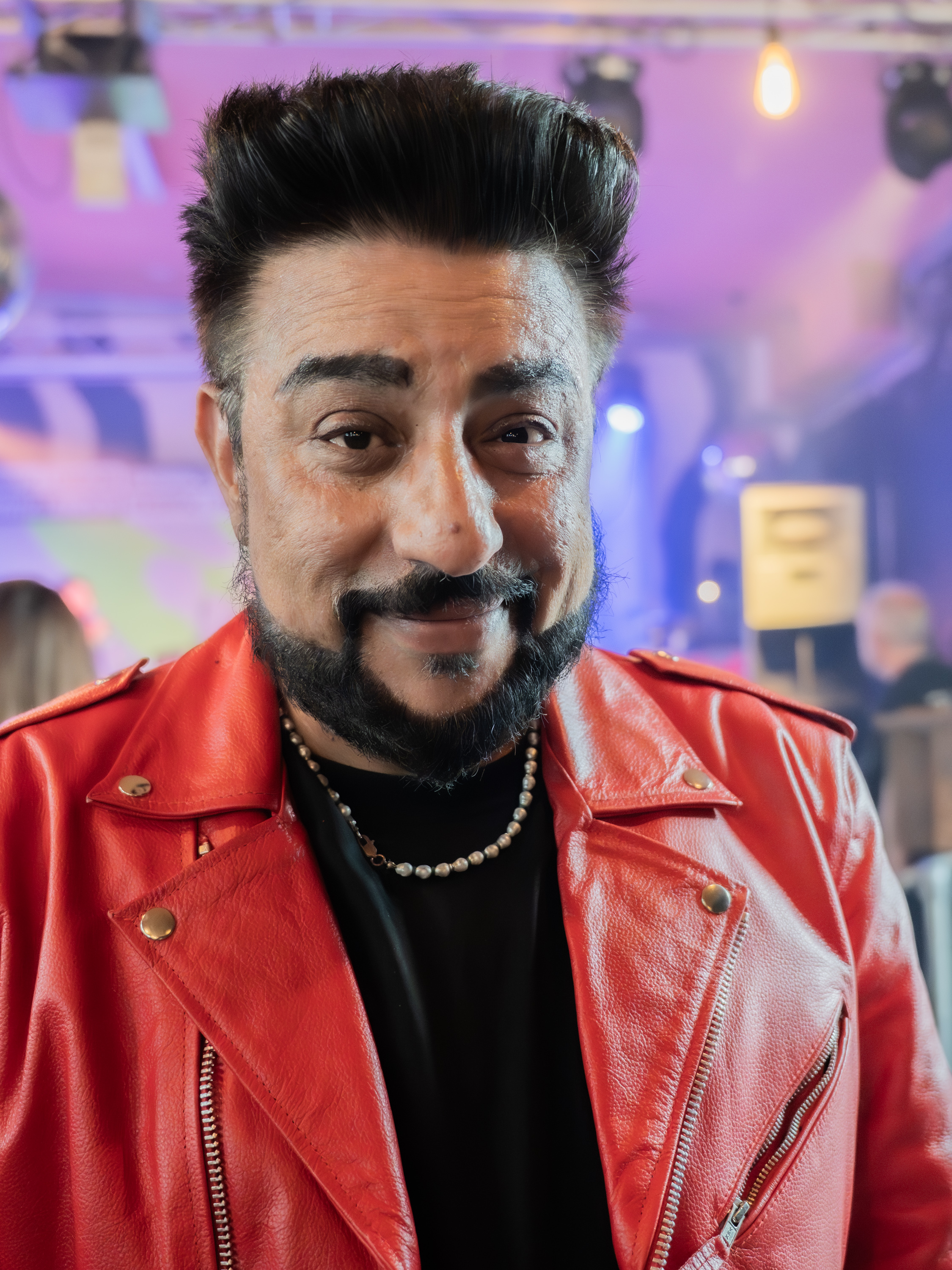
Curating the Going South music showcase at SXSW London, 3 June 2025

Paramdeep Sehdev (Punjabi: ਪਰਮਦੀਪ ਸਹਦੇਵ) (born 21 August 1971) better known as Bobby Friction, is a DJ, television presenter and radio presenter.

== Early life ==
Friction was born in Hammersmith, West London and grew up in Hounslow. After studying Contemporary Arts at Nottingham Trent University, Friction's career as a DJ started in 1997 with residencies at the ‘Swaraj' night at the Blue Note, Hoxton, and the ‘Shaanti' club at Birmingham’s Custard Factory.

== Broadcasting career ==
=== BBC Radio 1 ===
Friction joined BBC Radio 1 in 2002 co-hosting Bobby Friction & Nihal Presents with DJ Nihal. In 2003 the show won a Sony Radio Academy Award in the Specialist Music category. In 2004 Friction and Nihal released a compilation album of music featured on the show.

=== BBC Asian Network ===
Friction joined BBC Asian Network in 2005, initially presenting the station's Saturday afternoon Album Chart Show and then The Mix on Sunday afternoons. In 2006 he began presenting a weeknightly show, Friction, showcasing new music by British Asian and South Asian artists. Friction moved to a daily drivetime show at the station in 2012, winning Best Radio Show at the Asian Media Awards in 2016. In 2018 his documentary Straight Outta Mumbai explored the history of Indian hip-hop.

=== Television ===
In 2004 Friction was one of the judging panel in Channel 4's series Bollywood Star. He went on to present documentaries for the channel including Generation 7/7 and The Countryside Sucks. He has also made appearances on The Wright Stuff (Channel 5), The Daily Politics (BBC2) and Sunday Morning Live (BBC1).

Friction presents the 2018 BBC Four documentary Pump Up The Bhangra, documenting the cultural history and impact of bhangra music in Britain.

== Other work ==
Friction presented Friction on EVR, a weekly show on East Village Radio from 2012 and has been featured on streaming service Saavn. He has made regular appearances on BBC 6 Music, presenting a self-titled show, curating a tribute to Prince and sitting in for other presenters in their absence.

In 2015 Friction presented an Asian Network Night at the BBC Proms.

He has presented documentaries for BBC Radio 4 on topics such as pub culture in the West Midlands Punjabi community (so called Desi pubs), the aftermath of the assassination of Indira Gandhi in New Delhi in 1984, and filter bubbles in social media.
