= Sumant Moolgaokar =

Indian industrialist

- Born: 5 March 1906; Bombay, Bombay Presidency
- Died: 1 July 1989 (aged 82)
- Other names: SM
- Education: College of Engineering, Pune; Imperial College, London
- Employer(s): Tata Group; Maruti Suzuki
- Known for: Establishing Tata Motors. The Tata Sumo vehicle, launched in 1994, which was named after him.
- Spouse: Leela Sumant Moolgaokar
- Awards: Padma Bhushan (posthumous) (1990)

Sumant Moolgaokar (5 March 1906 – 1 July 1989), also known as SM, was an Indian industrialist, known as the architect of Tata Motors. He was the chief executive of Tata Engineering and Locomotive Company (TELCO). Moolgaokar was also vice-chairman of Tata Steel and served as the non-executive chairman of Maruti Suzuki. He was awarded the Padma Bhushan, third-highest civilian honour by the Government of India in 1990.

He started his career as an engineer in CP cement, located at kymore a small town in Madhya Pradesh now known as ACC kymore cement works where he worked from 1932–33 later he joined TATA group. He established Kymore engineering institute now known as Sumant Moolgaokar Training Institute on 17 March 1957 it has many departments in many disciplines from instrumentation to welding which are the core maintenance requirements for cement plants then it was first training Institute of its kind in India especially for cement industry. In his memory Sumant Moolgaokar Stadium opened at Telco Colony, Jamshedpur. The Tata Sumo vehicle, launched in 1994, was named after him.
