= Leela Sumant Moolgaokar =

Indian social worker (1916–1992)

Leela Moolgaokar

Sheriff of Bombay
- In office 1975 - 1976
- Preceded by: T. V. Ramanujam
- Succeeded by: Anjanabai Magar

Personal details
- Born: 10 October 1916
- Died: 20 May 1992 (aged 75)
- Spouse: Sumant Moolgaokar
- Occupation: Radiographer, social worker
- Known for: Pioneering volunteer blood transfusion service in India
- Awards: Padma Shri (1963)

Leela Sumant Moolgaokar (10 October 1916 – 20 May 1992) was an Indian social worker, known for pioneering volunteer blood transfusion service in India. Her husband, Sumant Moolgaokar was Chairman of Tata Motors and also remained vice-chairman of Tata Steel.

== Life ==
She started her career as a radiographer at the St George Hospital, Mumbai. In 1965, she started Tata Motors Grahini Social Welfare Society (TMGSWS), which ran employment generation schemes for the women in household of company employees.

== Awards ==
She was awarded the Padma Shri, fourth highest civilian honour of India by the President of India, in 1963. She remained Sheriff of Bombay in 1975–76.
